= Margaret Lynch =

Margaret Lynch (born 1932) was best known for her role as one of the few female members of the crew on the SS Great Britain. She worked on the ship for 7 years and was recognised in the press as 'an institution'. Her role as a stewardess was something that became more common as more women were travelling on passenger ships in the mid nineteenth century.

== Early life ==
Margaret was born in Dublin in 1831. No records have been found of her early life, but crew documents for the SS Great Britain held in the National Archives show her place of birth. They also show that by the time Margaret joined the ship she was 35 years old and widowed.

== Working life ==
Through the development of luxury passenger liners like the SS Great Britain, women travellers became more commonplace and this required the assistance of female stewardesses. This meant that women had the opportunity to work at sea. They would serve first class women who were travelling without their own servants. They were also expected to control disorderly behaviour. Most stewardesses were unmarried or widowed like Margaret and were on average in their mid thirties to mid forties.

Margaret worked as a stewardess for many voyages to Australia between 1866 and 1872, making on average £5 a month. She was celebrated in an article in the Western Daily Press alongside other key crew members- “Mrs Lynch, the stewardess, has been in the vessel several years and is an institution.” Margaret’s final working journey was to Liverpool in 1872. It was during this voyage where Captain John Gray mysteriously disappeared. Margaret did travel back to Australia in 1873, but this time as a passenger.

There are no known records regarding what became of Margaret Lynch following her time aboard the SS Great Britain.
