= George, Count Joannes =

American dramatist

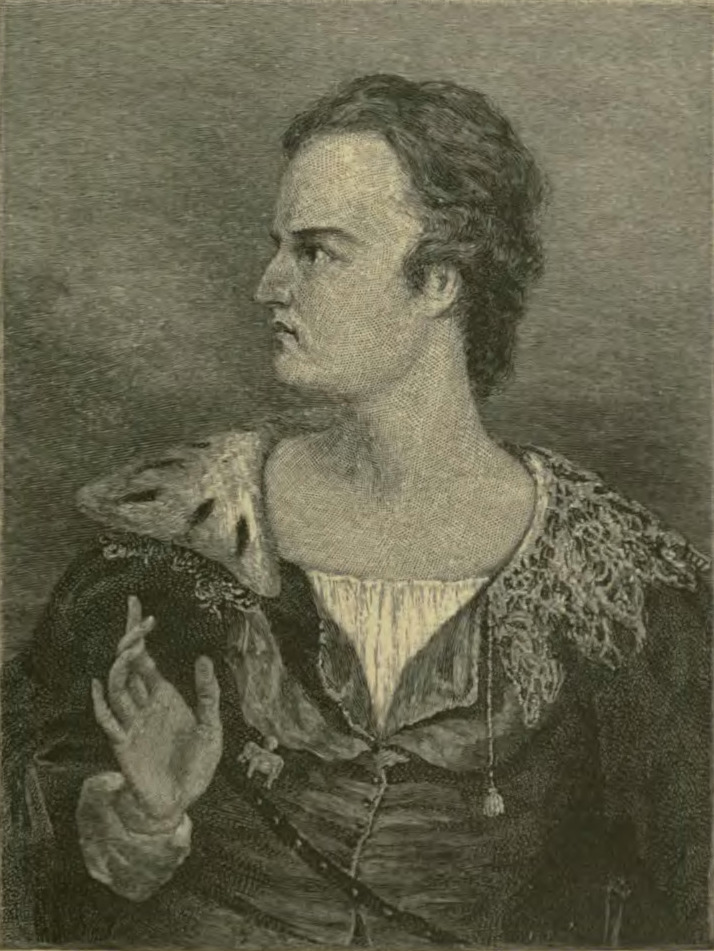
- Occupations: Actor, writer

George Jones (born probably London, England, May 10, 1810; died New York City, New York, December 30, 1879), known later in life as George, Count Joannes, was an English-American actor, author, journalist, and litigator best known for his eccentric behavior later in life.

== Early life and career in serious theatre ==
Jones was born in England in 1810. When he was six, his family emigrated to Boston; the voyage was so harsh that his sister died, a brother went mad, and Jones was blind for six weeks. As a young man he studied elocution with Daniel Webster, spoke at Faneuil Hall and won medals in rhetoric. By 1829 he was performing regularly at the Tremont Theatre in Boston. Thomas S. Hamblin hired him for the 1831-2 season in New York at the Bowery Theatre. He continued to play leading roles in the New York theaters until 1836, when he sailed for England. In England he played in various Shakespeare plays and other roles, to considerable success. By late 1836 he had returned to New York, where he played Hamlet at the National Theater. About 1837 he married actress Melinda Topping, and on July 12, 1839 their daughter Avonia, later a prominent actress herself, was born. Avonia's sister Caroline Emma was older. The Joneses moved to Virginia shortly after Avonia's birth; Jones managed the Marshall Theater in Richmond, and had the Avon Theater in Norfolk built.

== Europe and his returns ==
Jones' behavior became more eccentric. He had always been egotistical, but this became even more marked. He wrote long letters to the newspapers detailing the successes and honors of his European tour. On his return he painted a drop curtain for the Norfolk theater he was managing, and on tour he distributed bills advertising "Mr. and Mrs. George Jones/The Greatest Living Actors/With Their Original Drop Curtain/Painted by George Jones Himself". In 1841 he moved to England, where he lived until 1857. It might have been around this time that he separated from his wife Melinda; they were divorced in 1850, at her request.

In England, Jones wrote books and gave orations. He claimed to have been "Principal Orator" at the Royal Panopticon in London. And he later claimed that in March 1847 he was made a "Knight of the Golden Spur" and "Count Palatine".

He married Rosetta Maria (or "Mary") Van der Gucht (b. 1835) in London on May 1, 1854. They had a daughter named Eugenie, born Feb. 3, 1855; she died about a year later. His wife was with him in Paris in 1856, but there is no mention of her after that.

In December 1858 he journeyed on the steamship Fulton from Havre to New York, arriving in early January 1859. By June plans were made for a benefit appearance for Count Joannes (for so he now called himself) on the New York stage, possibly as Hamlet, and this was being reported as a joke - his vanity and assumption of a title had turned many against him.

== Massachusetts ==
Now living in Massachusetts, in June 1860 the Count Joannes filed a lawsuit for libel over a letter from a clergyman attempting to dissuade a woman from marrying him. He argued his case himself, and, after two trials, received a substantial sum from him. His new wife's given name was "Mary Eliza".

Count Joannes then commenced a series of libel suits in Massachusetts against various persons who he claimed impugned his sanity or his good name. After thirteen suits had been filed over several years, in February 1864 the Count was charged with barratry, tried, and convicted. The court discovered it was unable to sentence him because he was not a member of the bar, and suspended his sentence. Nevertheless, the Count and his wife moved back to New York City in March 1864.

== New York ==
The Count announced there that he was seeking students in drama, and also a benefit performance of Hamlet on April 30, 1864. Melinda Jones was to play the Queen. This performance and the reviews in the newspapers occasioned another round of lawsuits. One of the more interesting cases involved a handbill which the Count had circulated, which apparently implied that the Count's daughter Avonia Jones and the actor Edwin Booth would appear at the benefit at the Academy of Music - when actually they were appearing there at other times. The New York Tribune called the claim a fraud, and the Count sued editor Horace Greeley for libel. The trial included testimony by P. T. Barnum, who was called upon to give his opinion of the handbill. The Count lost his case.

In 1865 he briefly published a weekly newspaper named The New-York Joannes Journal.

The Count's daughter Avonia died in New York City in 1867. Mary Eliza divorced him in May 1869 in Boston for "desertion and lack of support".

The Count continued to file cases, and actually became a member of the New York Bar. He had few clients, but spent much time attending courts, sometimes rising to interject comments or protest errors in the proceedings. He announced that he had found the murderer of Benjamin Nathan, a certain James Hughes, but a grand jury failed to agree with him.

On April 29, 1871 the Count played Richard III at the Academy of Music to considerable applause; this was perhaps his last performance that did not draw jeers and catcalls.

From then until close to his death, the Count continued to appear on the stage, in New York and around the nation, to increasing ridicule. By 1878 at a New York performance of Richard III "scarcely a word said on the stage was audible, so loud and continuous were the cat-calls, laughter, and sarcastic comments and advice given by the spectators to the players." In the same year Edward Askew Sothern in The Crushed Tragedian was interpreted in New York as a parody of the Count, and it became a hit; the Count sued to suppress the production, unsuccessfully. In March 1879 the Count appeared on the stage as Dundreary in Our American Cousin, a role Sothern created.

Count Joannes' most faithful companion onstage and off in his last years was Lydia Fairbanks, a young student of his who he encouraged to use the stage name "Avonia Fairbanks". After his death on December 30, 1879, she made sure that he was buried properly, in Maple Grove Cemetery in Queens, New York City.

== Interactions with the famous ==
The Count's many letters and other interactions with the famous became fodder for the newspapers, particularly after his return to America in 1859. He filed lawsuits against Horace Greeley, Edward Sothern, Massachusetts governor John Albion Andrew, writer Francis Henry Underwood, The New York Times, and others. His correspondence with General Robert E. Lee offering him to defend him against charges of treason was reported in the newspapers. He also had correspondence with the Duke of Wellington, Lord Byron's mistress Teresa, Contessa Guiccioli, architect Alexander Jackson Davis, actor Edwin Forrest and many others.

== Legacy ==
"Count Joannes" continued to be remembered and studied in several of his professions. Three articles in magazines for lawyers were devoted to his legal career between 1896 and 1952. More recently, a scholar has written about his theatrical career. In his lifetime he was satirized in magazines such as Punchinello and Punch.

== Literary works ==
- The First Annual Jubilee Oration upon the Life, Character, and Genius of Shakespeare (1836)
- Oration on the national independence, Richmond, Va. July 4, 1840, before the Franklin society, at the city-hall, Franklin Society, 1840
- An Original History of Ancient America Anterior to the Time of Columbus; Proving the Identity of the Aborigines with the Tyrians and Israelites; and the Introduction of Christianity into the Western Hemisphere by the Apostle St. Thomas (1843)
- Tecumseh and the prophet of the west: an historical Israel-Indian tragedy in five act (play, 1844)
- The Life and History of Gen. Harrison (1844, published with Tecumseh)
- National poem on the birth (and baptism) of the imperial prince of the French born upon palm-sunday, March 16th, 1856..., 1856
