= Avonia Jones =

American actress

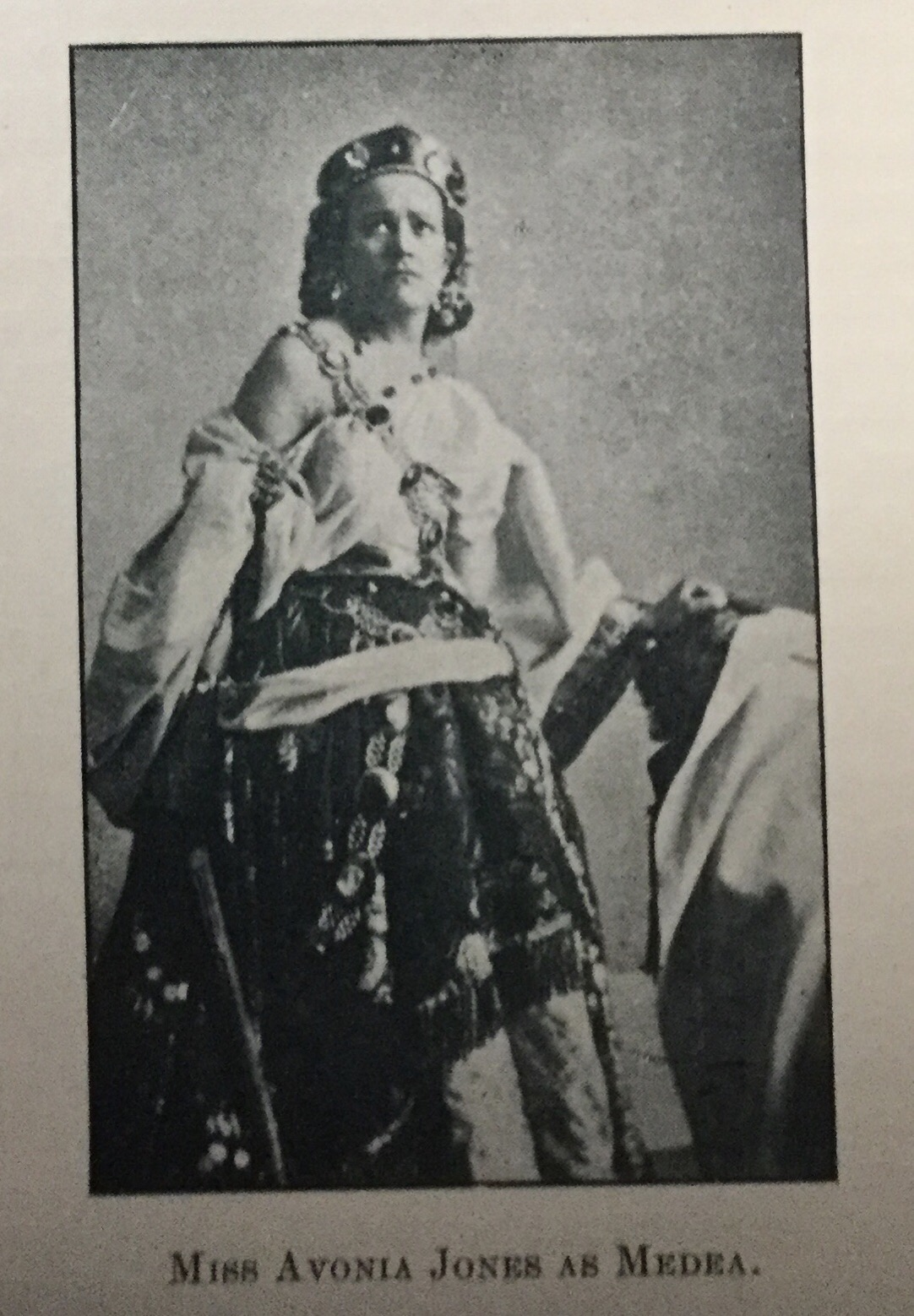
Avonia Jones as Medea

Avonia Stanhope Jones Brooke (July 12, 1839 – October 4, 1867) was an American actress, best known for tragic roles.

== Early life ==
Jones was born in New York City. She came from a theatrical family, the daughter of George "Count Joannes" Jones and Melinda Jones. Her father was an eccentric who was originally a serious Shakespearean actor; he later assumed a title, wrote books, practiced law, and put on increasingly ridiculed productions of Shakespeare. Her mother was a well-regarded actress who travelled with her daughter at the beginning of her career. Avonia and her older sister Caroline were in the custody of their mother after their parents' separation, probably in 1841 when George Jones left for Europe; their parents were divorced in 1850.

== Career ==
Jones's first appearance on the stage was in April 1856, in Cincinnati, Ohio, as "Parthenia" in "Ingomar". She toured America extensively in various productions, including John Savage's "Sybil" and a production of Romeo and Juliet in which her mother played Romeo and Jones Juliet. In 1859 she toured Australia, where she met Irish actor/producer Gustavus Vaughan Brooke, later her husband. She travelled to the United Kingdom with Brooke and her mother, Melinda Jones, on the SS Great Britain. They left Melbourne on 31 May 1861, and arrived in Liverpool 5 August 1861. She made her London debut November 5, 1861, at the Drury Lane Theatre as "Medea". She returned to America in 1863. In late 1864 and early 1865 she toured with producer Augustin Daly, mostly in Union-held areas of the Confederacy. Abraham Lincoln and his family saw her at Grover's Theatre in Washington, D.C., in January 1865. She returned to England in late 1865, and brought with her an American adaption of East Lynne, in which she appeared as "Isabel"; this played to considerable success. She then appeared at the New Surrey Theatre in London in another production of "East Lynne", in February 1866. Adapted for the stage by John Oxenford, it was popular and critically acclaimed. She also appeared as heroine "Kate Gaunt" in Charles Reade's adaption of his novel Griffith Gaunt in Newcastle upon Tyne and Manchester. Her appearances in Manchester in the summer of 1867 were her last; after returning to America, she died of consumption at a boarding house at 2 Bond Street in New York, October 5, 1867, at the age of 28. She was buried in Mount Auburn Cemetery in Watertown, Massachusetts.

An edition of John Savage's works reprinted a review of Avonia Jones in "Sybil", saying that it was "...successfully played by her for over sixty nights during that season, in Louisville, Chicago, Cincinnati, Richmond, New Orleans, and the other principal cities in the South and West. She afterwards appeared in California and Australia and was everywhere received in this character with enthusiasm. She was almost invariably called before the curtain after the third, fourth, and fifth acts of the play, and on one occasion the excited audience followed her to her hotel, and would not disperse until she made her appearance on the balcony."

The New York Times said of her in her obituary "As an actress her chief excellence was in the force and fire of her personations; the representation of delicacy and girlishness was not so agreeable to her as that of a hardy and vehement nature. She was tall and robust in frame, with piercing black eyes and agreeable features. ... Her understanding of mimic character was quick and thorough, and her intellectual attainments of a high order. Few actresses at the present day have had so much experience and received so much praise at so early an age."

A number of photos of her in costume on carte de visite exist, including some by Mathew Brady.

== Marriage and family ==
She married actor Gustavus V. Brooke in Liverpool, February 23, 1863; he was 21 years her senior. His career was then in a steep decline, probably due to excessive use of alcohol. He sailed for Australia in early 1866 in an attempt to revive his career and was lost in the wreck of the steamship London on January 11. Weeks later a bottle was found on the beach in Brighton with a message reading, "11th of January, on board the London. We are just going down. No chance of safety. Please give this to Avonia Jones, Surrey Theatre. —Gustavus Vaughan Brooke".

Avonia herself had no children. Her older sister Caroline Emma Jones married a man named William L. Bonney and had a daughter named Avonia Bonney (after her marriage Avonia Bonney Lichfield), who became an opera singer and vocal teacher; she also composed music.
