= Sister Mary Paul Mulquin =

Irish-born Roman Catholic religious sister (1842–1930)

Sister Mary Paul Mulquin (1842 – 10 February 1930) was a Roman Catholic nun and educator born in Adare, Limerick, Ireland. Born Katherine Mulquin to John Mulquin, a landowner, and his wife Catherine, née Sheehy, she changed her name in 1863 when she became a member of the Sisters of the Presentation of the Virgin Mary, a Roman Catholic religious order.

In 1873, she travelled to Australia with six other nuns on board the SS Great Britain, arriving in Melbourne on 21 December 1873. While on board, she kept a diary which recorded her daily life.

In Australia, she helped to found a Presentation Convent and College in St Kilda, Victoria. She died aged about 88 and is buried in St Kilda Cemetery, alongside the other nuns who travelled together.

Sister Mary Paul retired in 1890.
