= William Charles (fur trader) =

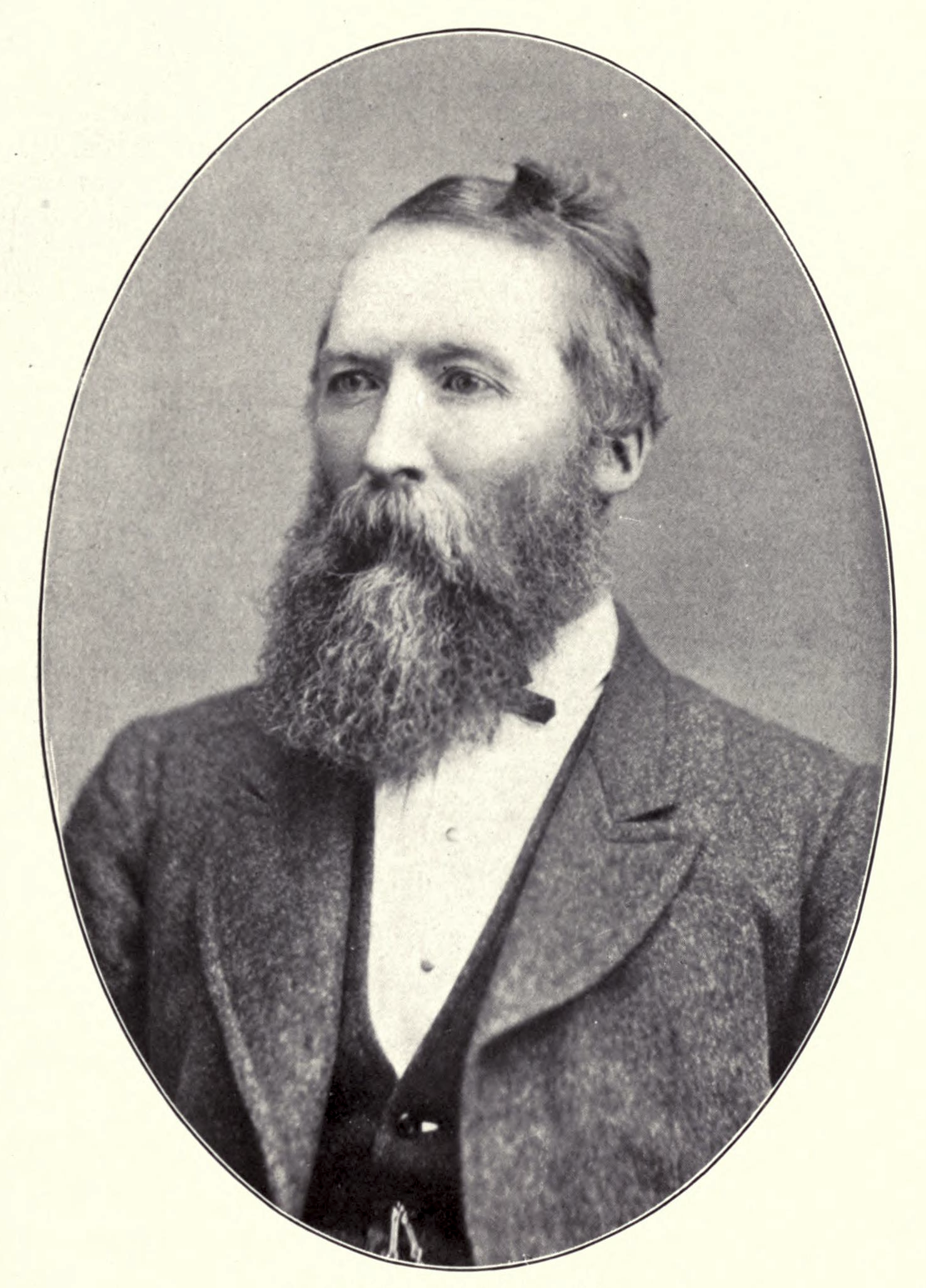
- Born: March 5, 1831; Edinburgh, Scotland
- Died: May 21, 1903 (aged 72); Victoria, British Columbia
- Employer: Hudson's Bay Company
- Known for: Fur trader and HBC employee
- Spouse: Mary Ann Birnie
- Children: 3

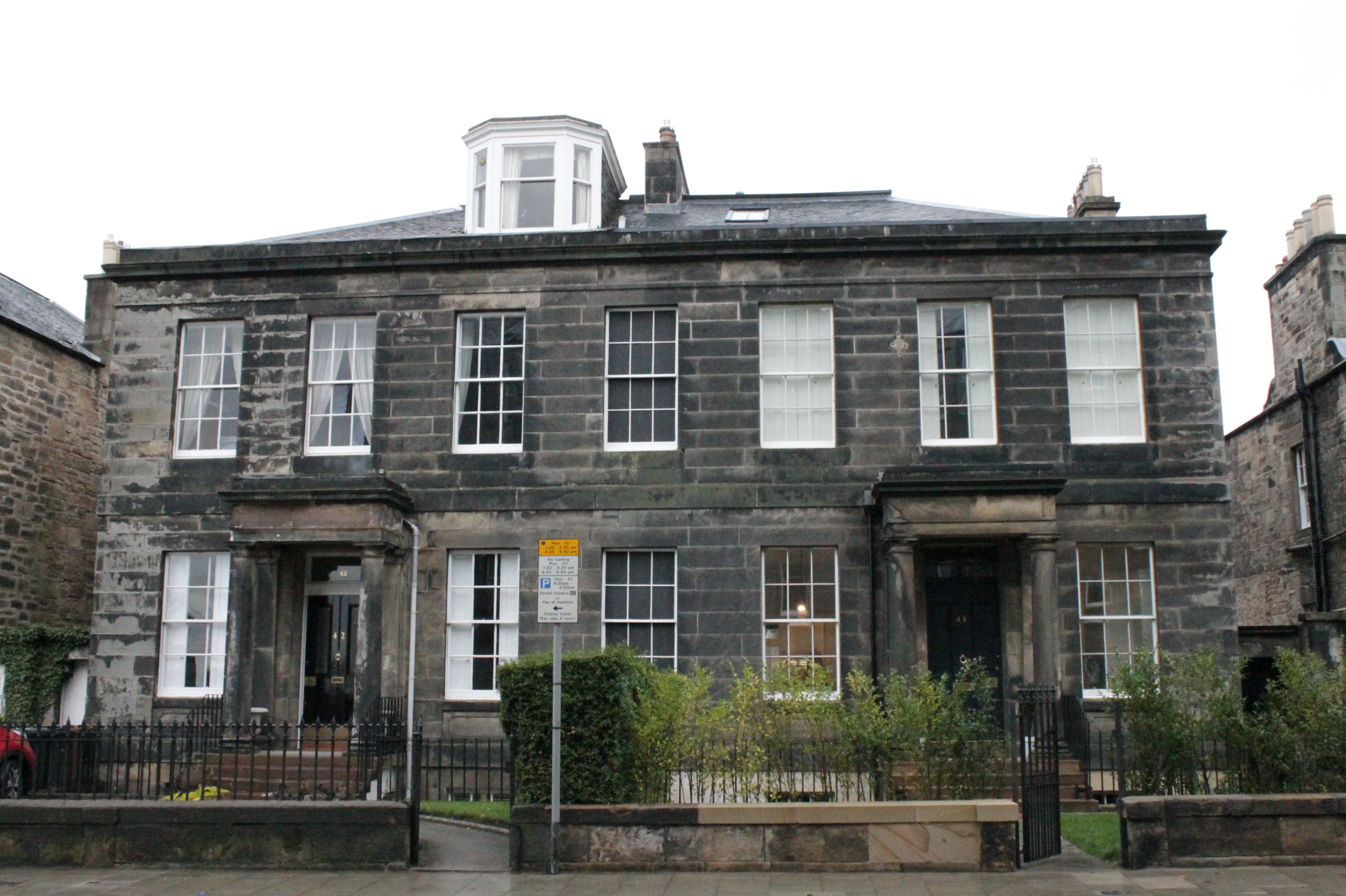
42 Inverleith Row (left)

William Charles (March 5, 1831 – May 21, 1903) was a Pacific coast pioneer, Hudson's Bay Company factor, and a prominent figure in the early history of British Columbia.

== Life ==
Born in Edinburgh, Scotland, the son of John Charles (1805–1882), one of the early factors of the Hudson's Bay Company, and Jane Auld, the daughter of fur trader William Auld. He was educated at Hill Street School and University of Edinburgh. The family moved to 42 Inverleith Row (then a new villa) in the late 1840s.

In May 1852 he travelled between Liverpool and New York on the SS Great Britain.

He came to the Pacific coast of Canada from Edinburgh by way of Panama in 1852, and was for a time employed by Breck & Ogden of Portland, Oregon. In June 1853, he joined the HBC at Fort Vancouver (Vancouver, Wash.) as an apprentice clerk. He was stationed at different times at old Fort Vancouver on the Columbia River, Fort Hall, Utah, and at Fort Boisé. He was transferred to Victoria, British Columbia in 1858 and was subsequently in charge of Fort Hope, Fort Yale and Fort Kamloops.

The Fraser gold-rush of 1858, transformed the HBC in British Columbia from a fur-trading to a retailing company as the HBC placed steamers on the lower Fraser and on Kamloops Lake and entered the retail trade, selling hardware and food at all its posts in the gold districts. Joseph William McKay and Ovid Allard worked with Charles on these projects.

In 1874 he was promoted to the grade of chief factor and placed in charge of the Victoria establishment. Later, in 1874, he was made inspecting chief factor of the western department, an important post, including in its jurisdiction all the Hudson's Bay establishments in and west of the Rocky Mountains, retaining this position up to the time of his retirement in 1885, thereafter residing permanently in Victoria to the time of his death in 1903.

== Family ==
On October 3, 1859, Charles married Mary Ann Birnie, a native of Astoria, Oregon. They had two daughters and a son.
