= James Hosken =

British naval officer

Vice-Admiral James Hosken
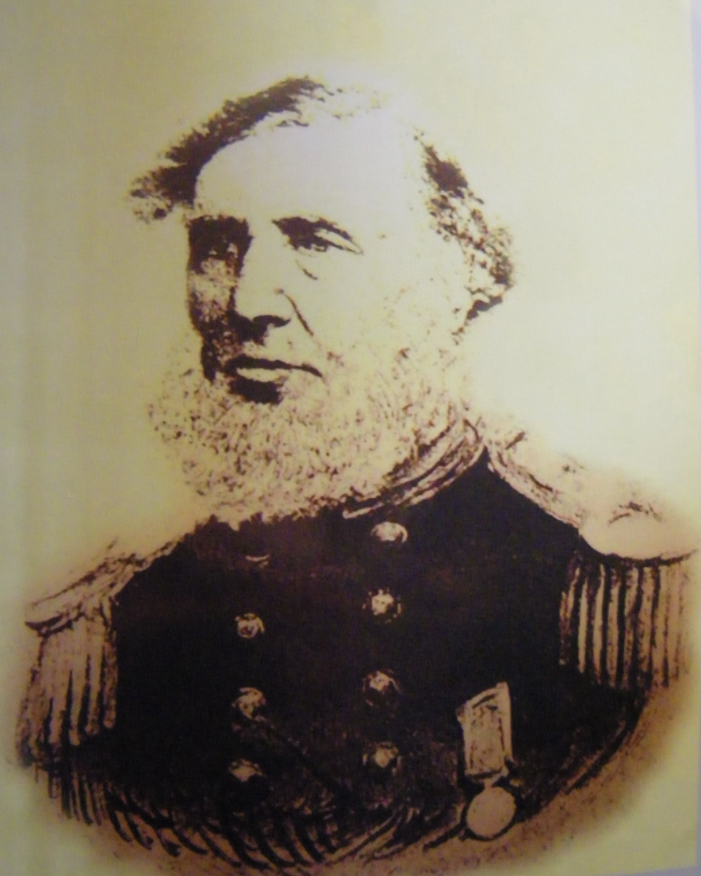
- Vice-Admiral James Hosken
- Born: 6 December 1798; Plymouth, Devon
- Died: 2 January 1885 (aged 86); Ilfracombe, Devon
- Burial place: Arnos Vale Cemetery, Bristol
- Military career
- Allegiance: United Kingdom
- Branch: Royal Navy
- Service years: 1810–1832; 1851–1868
- Rank: Vice-Admiral
- Commands: HMS Princess Elizabeth; HMS Tyrian; SS Great Western; SS Great Britain; HMS Banshee; HMS Belleisle
- Conflicts: Napoleonic Wars; Crimean War; Baltic Campaign of 1854

Vice-Admiral James Hosken (6 December 1798 – 2 January 1885) was a British naval officer and a pioneer of ocean steam navigation. He joined the Royal Navy during the Napoleonic Wars, and after more than 20 years of service left to join the merchant navy and serve as captain of the steamships SS Great Western and the SS Great Britain. He returned to the Royal Navy to see service during the Crimean War.

== Biography ==
=== Early naval career ===
Hosken was born in Plymouth, the son James Hosken (1756-1848), a navy warrant officer, and Elizabeth Veale (1767-?). He entered the Royal Navy on 23 February 1808, (two months after his 9th birthday). In 1810 he was appointed midshipman aboard Formidable, and later served in the Baltic, the Mediterranean, and the North Sea, until the end of the war in 1815. He passed the examination for lieutenant in 1816, but was unable to gain a commission. From 1816 to 1819 he served in the frigate Pique in the West Indies, then spent three years in the Channel serving aboard the brig Wolf. From 1824 to 1828 he served as Mate of the revenue cutter Scout, engaged in the suppression of smuggling. Finally, on 9 August 1828, he was appointed lieutenant of the bomb vessel Aetna, serving in the Mediterranean under Captain Stephen Lushington. Aetna was paid off in May 1830, and afterwards he commanded the packet ships Princess Elizabeth and Tyrian, sailing to the West Indies and South America. He left the Navy in October 1832.

=== Merchant captain ===
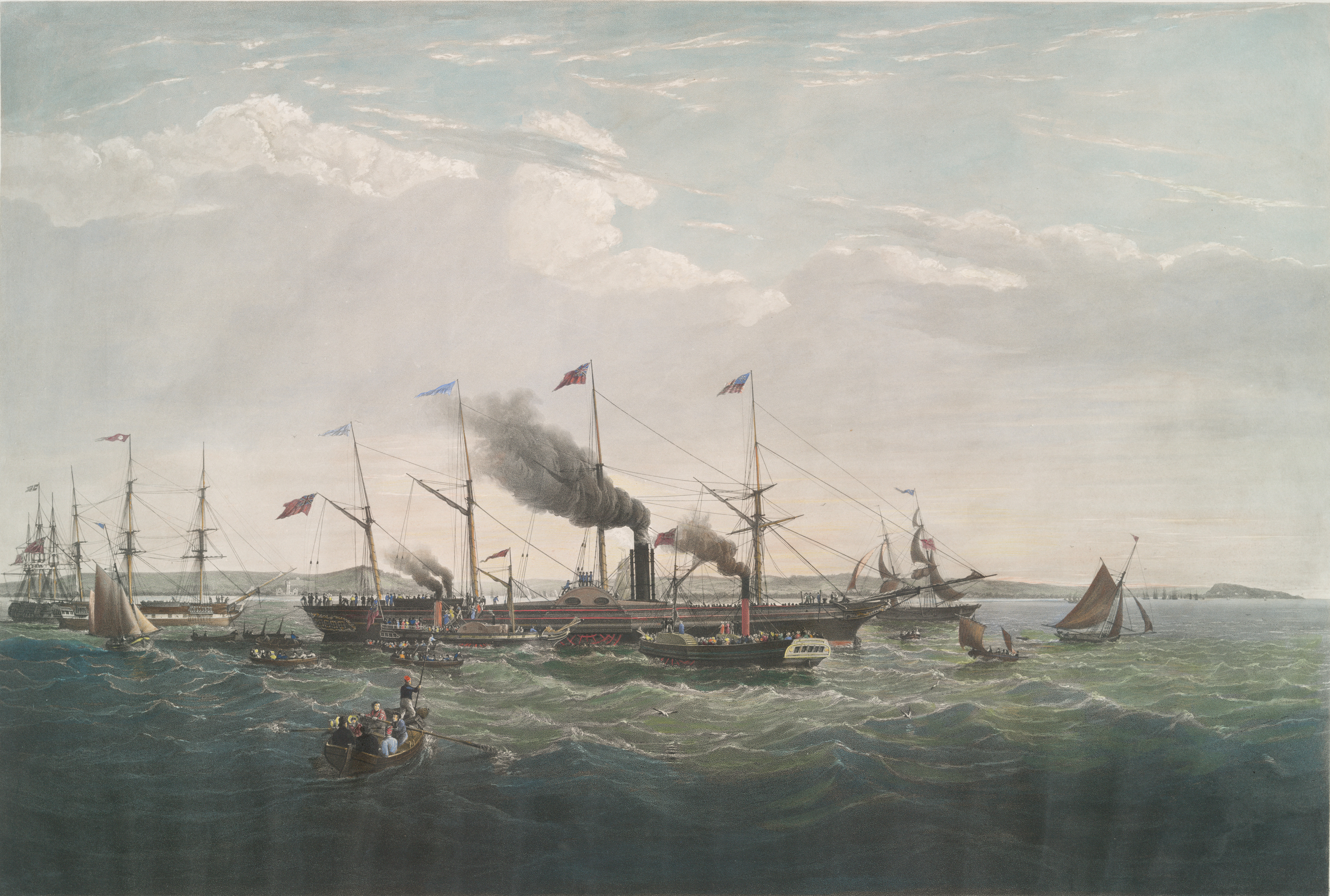
Great Western departing Bristol in 1838.

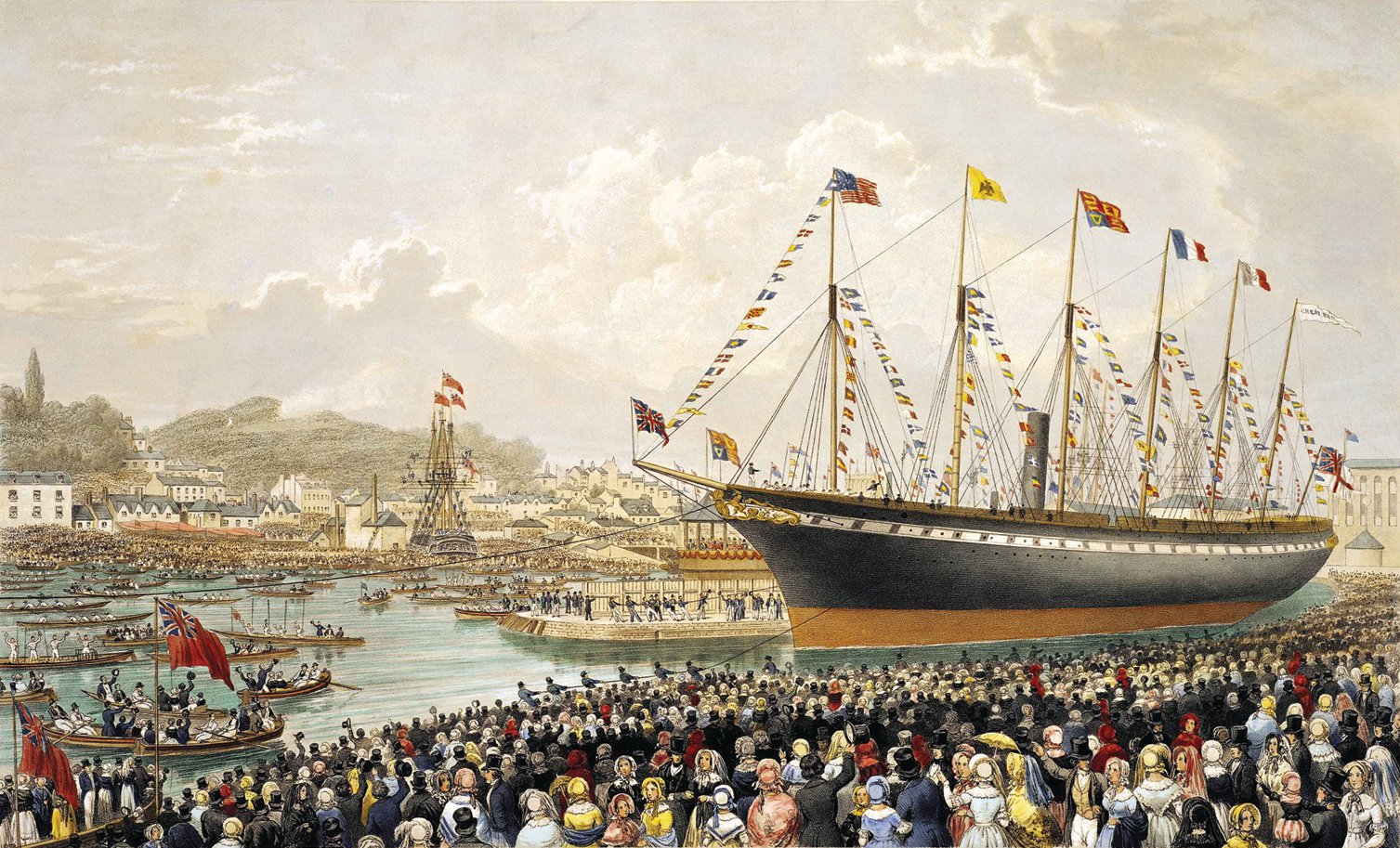
Launch of Great Britain at Bristol, July 1843. Painting by Joseph Walter.

Between 1833 and 1836 he was the captain of a merchant ship sailing between Liverpool and South America. In 1837 he devoted himself to the study of the marine steam engine, and towards the end of the year was appointed to the command of the Great Western Steamship Company's paddle-wheel steamship SS Great Western. She sailed from Bristol on her maiden voyage on 8 April 1838, and arrived at New York fifteen days later on the 23rd. This represented a dramatic increase in speed, as the average duration of an Atlantic crossing from England to America in a sailing ship was 34 days. Side paddle steamers had brought this down to 17 days, but with experience Hosken brought his average down to 13 days in the sixty-six voyages he made between England and America. In 1844 he was appointed to command of Great Western's SS Great Britain, the first iron-hulled screw steamship and at that time the largest ship afloat. She sailed from Liverpool for New York on her maiden voyage in August 1845. However, on the night of 22 September 1846, during her fifth voyage, she ran aground in Dundrum Bay, Ireland. Weather conditions were poor, and an error on the chart led Hosken to believe that the lighthouse on St. John's Point, at the entrance of the bay, was the Calf of Man, which they had passed four hours before. After several months the ship was refloated, but Hosken had no further employment in the merchant service.

=== Later career ===
From 1848 to 1849 Hosken served as master attendant and postmaster at Labuan, recently ceded to England. He then returned to the navy and in 1851 he was appointed to command of the despatch vessel Banshee in the Mediterranean, and later in the Channel. On 26 September 1853 he was promoted to commander, and during the Baltic campaigns of 1854–55 commanded the hospital ship Belleisle. At the end of the Crimean War he was employed in bringing back troops from the Black Sea. In June 1857 he was promoted to captain, and in 1868 was placed on the retired list.

He was promoted to rear-admiral in April 1875, and vice-admiral in August 1879, and died at Ilfracombe, Devon, on 2 January 1885. He is buried in Arnos Vale Cemetery, Bristol.

In 1878, his son James Hosken, a marine consulting engineer aged 45, together with his wife and three of their six children, were drowned in the Sinking of SS Princess Alice disaster on the river Thames at Woolwich. Rear-Admiral Hosken assumed guardianship of his three surviving orphaned grandchildren, aged 12, 8, and 2. Perhaps due to his advancing years, by 1881 both the two younger children were in separate orphanages, while the eldest remained with him in Ilfracombe.

In 1889 Elizabeth Ann, his second wife, published an Autobiographical Sketch of the Public Career of Admiral James Hosken.

== Publications ==
- Hosken, James (1838). The logs of the first voyage, made with the unceasing aid of steam, between England and America, by the Great Western of Bristol, also an appendix and remarks. Bristol: Great Western Steamship Company.

== See also ==
- O'Byrne, William Richard (1849). "Hosken, James" . A Naval Biographical Dictionary . John Murray – via Wikisource.
