= HMS Belleisle (1819) =

Ship of the line of the Royal Navy

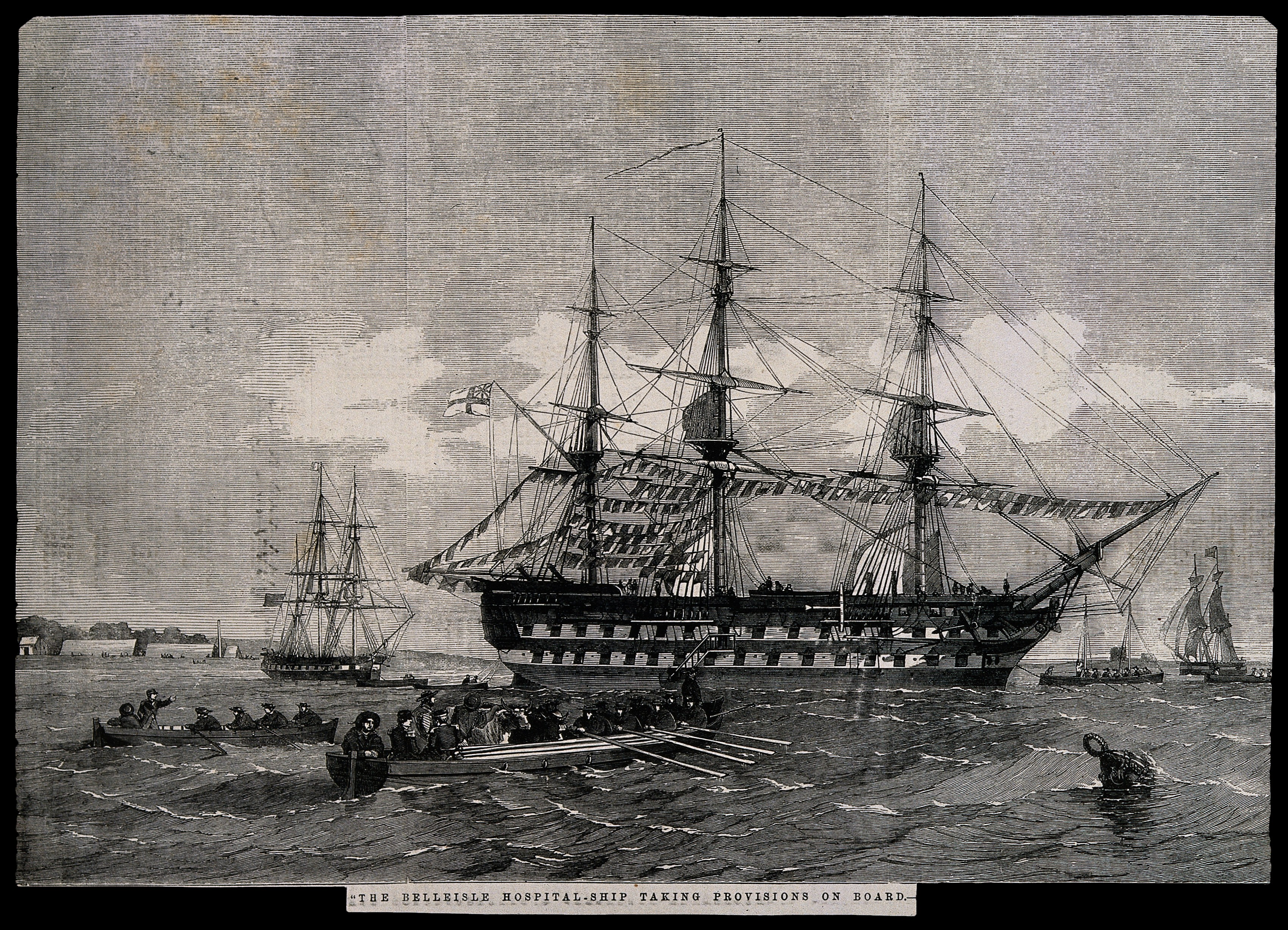
- The hospital ship Belleisle loading provisions during the Crimean War

History

United Kingdom
- Name: Belleisle
- Ordered: 17 November 1812
- Builder: Pembroke Dockyard
- Laid down: February 1816
- Launched: 26 April 1819
- Commissioned: 10 April 1839
- Out of service: 10 November 1868
- Reclassified: As a troopship, 1841; As a hospital ship, 1854
- Fate: Broken up by 12 October 1872

General characteristics
- Class & type: Repulse-class ship of the line
- Tons burthen: 1,709 12/94 (bm)
- Length: 174 ft 3 in (53.1 m) (gundeck)
- Beam: 48 ft 1 in (14.7 m)
- Draught: 16 ft 10 in (5.1 m) (light)
- Depth of hold: 20 ft (6.1 m)
- Sail plan: Full-rigged ship
- Complement: 590
- Armament: 74 muzzle-loading, smoothbore guns; Gundeck: 28 × 32 pdr guns; Upper deck: 28 × 18 pdr guns; Quarterdeck: 2 × 18 pdr guns + 12 × 32 pdr carronades; Forecastle: 2 × 18 pdr guns + 2 × 32 pdr carronades; Poop deck: 6 × 18 pdr carronades

Plans of Belleisle

HMS Belleisle was a third-rate Repulse-class ship of the line built for the Royal Navy during the 1810s. Upon completion in 1819, the ship was placed in ordinary. She was not commissioned until 1839 and was assigned to the Mediterranean Fleet. Belleisle was converted into a troopship in 1841 and participated in the First Opium War in China. The ship converted into a hospital ship in 1854 and served in the Baltic Sea during the Crimean War of 1854–1855. She participated in the Second Opium War of 1856–1860 and was placed in reserve upon her return home. Bellisle was used as a hospital ship for sick sailors in 1866–1868 in Greenwich, before she was broken up in 1872.

== Description ==
Belleisle measured 174 feet 3 inches (53.1 m) on the gundeck and 143 feet 5 inches (43.7 m) on the keel. She had a beam of 48 feet 1 inch (14.7 m), a depth of hold of 20 feet (6.1 m) and had a tonnage of 1,709 12/94 tons burthen. The ship's draught was 13 feet 7 inches (4.1 m) forward and 16 feet 10 inches (5.1 m) aft at light load; fully loaded, her draught would be significantly deeper. The Repulse-class ships were armed with 74 muzzle-loading, smoothbore guns that consisted of twenty-eight 32-pounder guns on her lower gundeck and twenty-eight 18-pounder guns on her upper gundeck. Their forecastle mounted a pair of 18-pounder guns and two 32-pounder carronades. On their quarterdeck they carried two 18-pounders and a dozen 32-pounder carronades. Above the quarterdeck was their poop deck with half-a-dozen 18-pounder carronades. Their crew numbered 590 officers and ratings. The ships were fitted with three masts and ship-rigged.

== Construction and career ==
Belleisle was the second ship of her name to serve in the Royal Navy. She was ordered on 18 December 1812 as part of the third batch of three Repulse-class ships of the line designed by Sir William Rule, co-Surveyor of the Navy. Incorporating co-Surveyor of the Navy Robert Seppings' interlocking, diagonal trusses, the ship was laid down at Pater Yard (later HM Dockyard, Pembroke) in February 1816 and was launched on 26 April 1819. She was completed on 21 June at HM Dockyard, Devonport for ordinary. Belleisle was ordered to be razeed in September 1832, but this was revoked a few days later. The ship received a "Middling Repair" at Pembroke from November 1832 to August 1833. She was refitted as a "demonstration ship" at Devonport in February–March 1836. The ship was commissioned by Captain John Nicholas on 10 April 1839 and outfitted there for sea from April to September for service with the Mediterranean Fleet. Her service there was unsatisfactory and she was deemed ineffective as a warship.

Paid off the following year, Belleisle was converted into as a 20-gun troopship from September to November 1841 and was recommissioned on 23 October by Captain John Kingcome for service in the East Indies. She sailed for China in December 1841 for the First Opium War. The ship stayed in China until the Treaty of Nanking was signed on 29 August 1842 and participated in the Yangtze campaign that July. Belleisle was paid off in late 1843 at Devonport.

The ship was recommissioned at Plymouth by Kingcome on 24 March 1846 during a refit that lasted from March to May. Her service was brief as she was paid off on 7 September 1848. Belleisle was refitted as a hospital ship at Plymouth from March to May 1854. She was commissioned by Commander James Hosken on 13 March. During the Crimean War she served in the Baltic, contributing all six of her 32-pounders to the successful siege of Bomarsund Fortress. On 10 June 1856, the ship ran aground on the Englishman's Shoal, in the Bosphorus. She was refloated on 13 June and was paid off later that year.

Belleisle was recommissioned on 20 March 1857 by Commander John Rodd and refitted at Plymouth between April and June for service in the East Indies and China during the Second Opium War. Commander Henry Bingham relieved Rodd on 13 December 1858 and the ship was probably paid off in 1860. On 19 May 1866, she was lent by the Admiralty to the Seamen's Hospital Society for use as a hospital ship in Greenwich for seamen suffering from cholera. Whilst being towed up the River Thames by the tug Medusa, she ran aground, but was refloated on the next tide. Belleisle was ordered to be returned to Sheerness Dockyard when she was no longer needed on 10 November 1868. The ship was ordered to be broken up at Chatham Dockyard on 15 May 1872; her demolition was completed on 12 October.
