= John Gray (master mariner) =

Scottish merchant seaman and captain

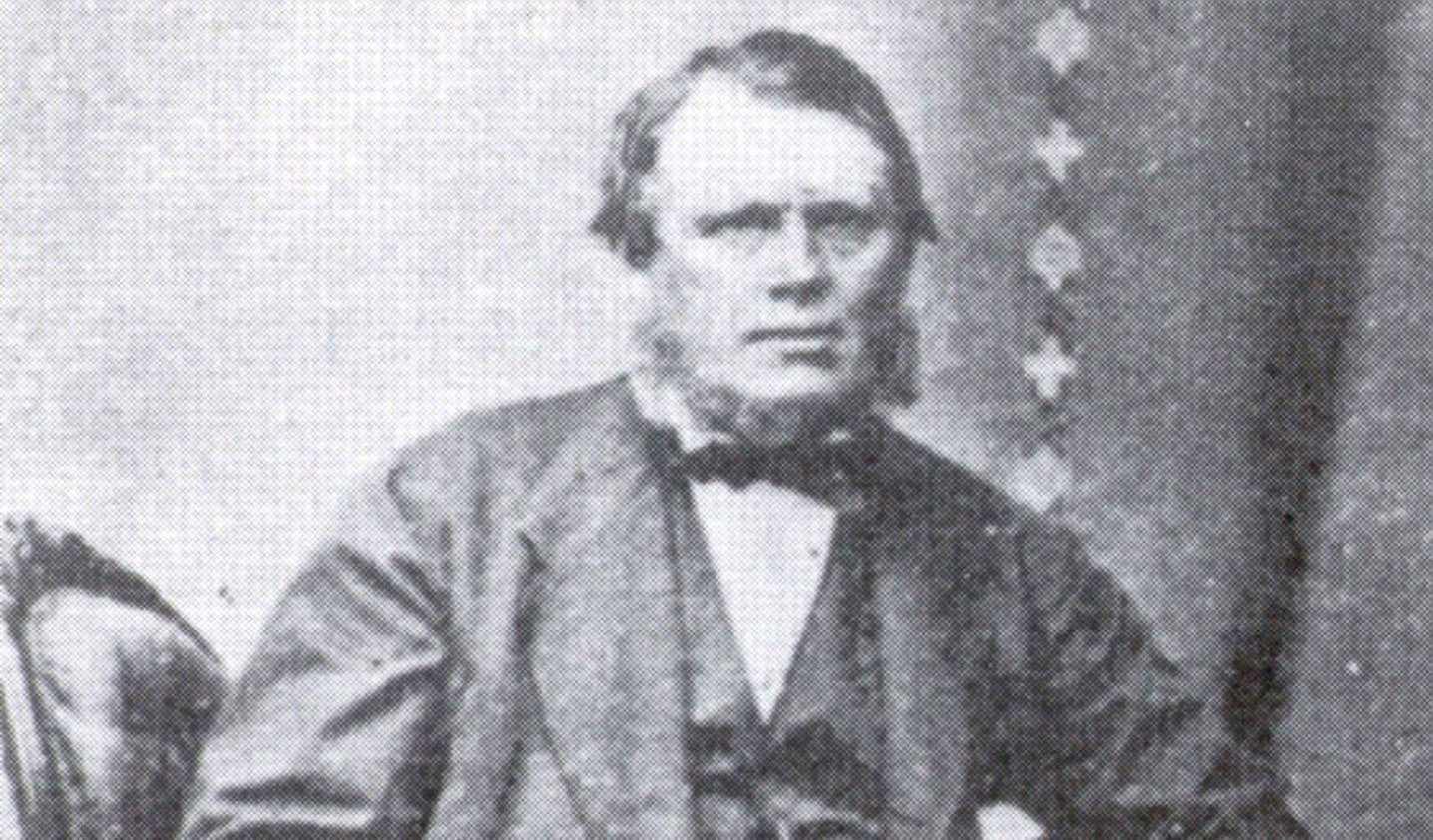
- Born: 8 December 1819; Unst
- Died: 25 November 1872 (aged 52); Atlantic Ocean
- Occupation: Master mariner

John Gray (12 December 1819 – 25 November 1872) was a Scottish merchant seaman and master mariner who served as Captain of the SS Great Britain for eighteen years. He died in mysterious circumstances, after apparently jumping or falling overboard.

== Early life ==
Gray, was born on 8 December 1819 at Valand, Westing, Unst, in the Shetland Isles, the son of Sarah (née Johnson) and Robert Gray.

He went to sea at a young age, initially joining the Eagle Line.

== Career ==
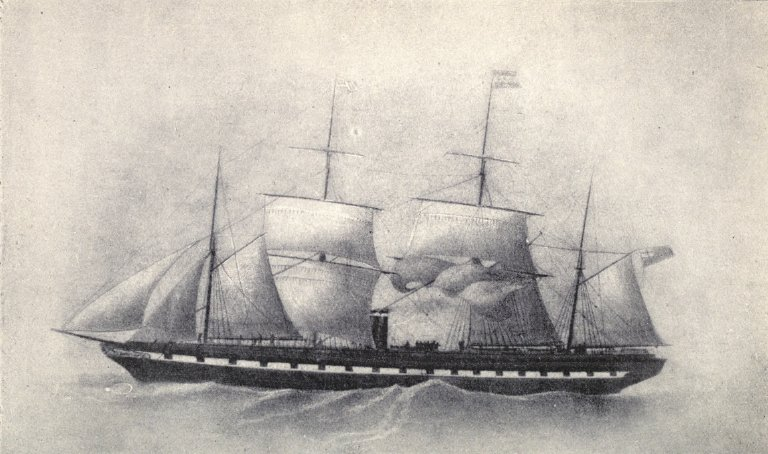
Great Britain in 1853, after her refit to four masts

Gray progressed to commanding ships for Gibbs, Bright & Co. He took both a demotion and a pay cut in order to serve as Second Officer on their SS Great Britain in 1852, in time for the vessel's first voyage to Australia. He was promoted to First Officer for the second Australian voyage, then made Captain in April 1854, prior to the third, following the resignation of his predecessor Captain Matthews. He held the longest tenure of any SS Great Britain captain, and in that role completed 27 journeys from the United Kingdom to Australia and back. He was also her captain when she was used as a troop ship, during the Crimean War and the Indian Rebellion.

In 1869 a passenger wrote that he was:

the popular commander of a popular ship, deservedly esteemed for his tact and judgement. He knew how to handle his ship, his crew and his passengers

== Death ==
On his two penultimate voyages to Australia and back, Gray, according to subsequent newspaper reports:

suffered severely from liver and stomach complaint, brought on by pure anxiety to maintain the reputation of his ship in the strong competition with the London steam clippers

On 25 November 1872, thirty days into another return voyage from Melbourne to Liverpool, Gray complained of pain in his bowels and returned to his cabin. Near midnight he was seen walking towards the ship's deck. The next morning, he could not be found, and one of the transom windows at the ship's stern was open, having been locked the night before. The letter he had been seen writing that night could not be found.

Since there was no way to send a message ashore, his wife Mary Ann (née Jamieson) only found out that she was a widow when she and one of their daughters met the ship upon its arrival in Liverpool in January 1873. His death was reported on the front pages of newspapers in the United Kingdom and in Australia.

== In fiction ==
The novel Revenge My Death by Bill Jackman tells an invented story of Gray's disappearance being due to him being kidnapped by a passenger.
