= SS Great Britain =

1840s British steamship, museum ship

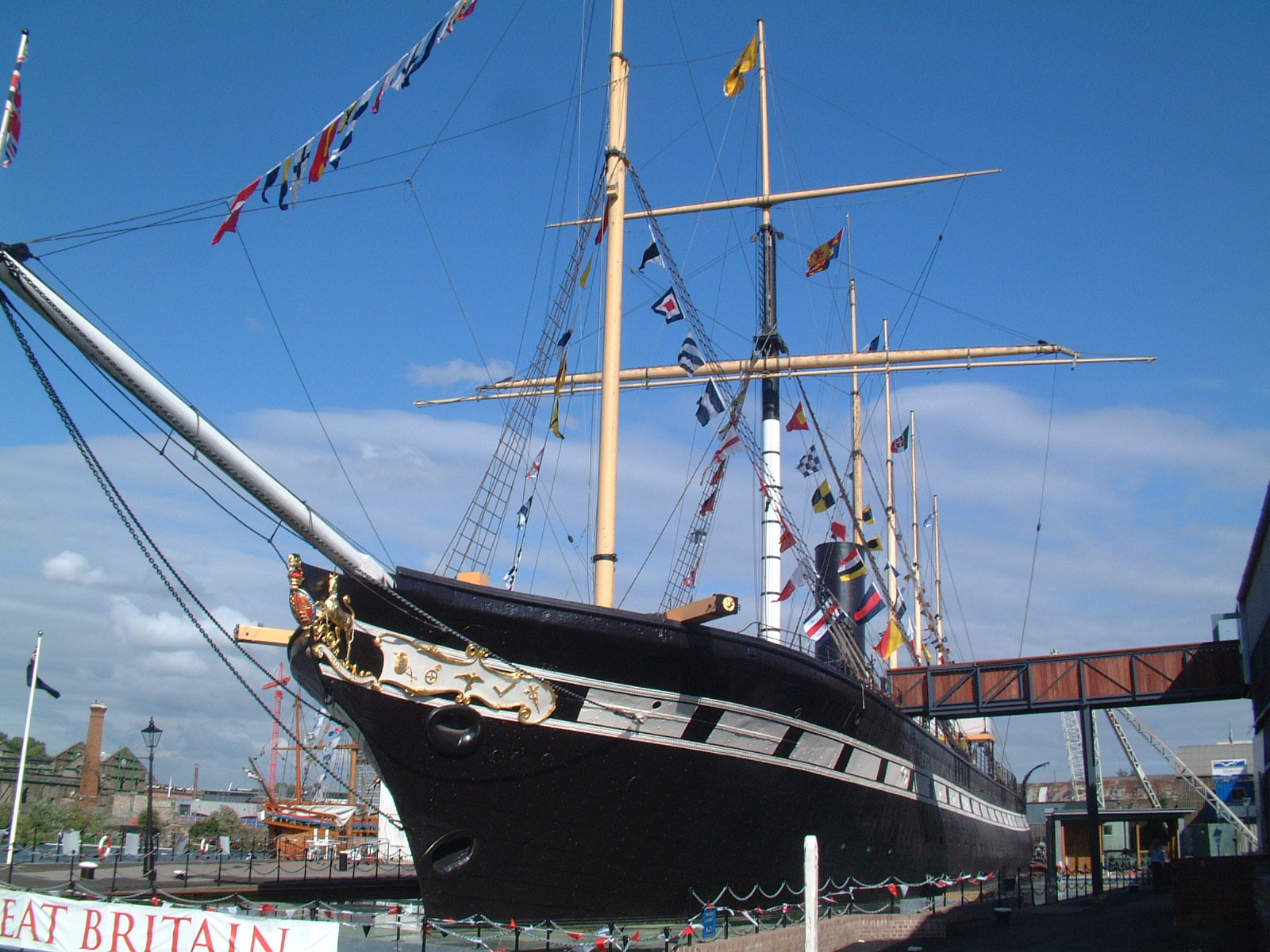
- SS Great Britain in dry dock at Bristol in 2005, preserved for exhibition as a museum ship

History

United Kingdom
- Name: Great Britain
- Owner: Great Western Steamship Company
- Port of registry: Bristol
- Builder: William Patterson
- Cost: Projected: £70,000; Actual: £117,000
- Laid down: July 1839
- Launched: 19 July 1843
- Completed: 1845
- Maiden voyage: 26 July 1845
- In service: 1845–1886
- Home port: Bristol, England 51°26′57″N 2°36′30″W
- Status: Museum ship

General characteristics
- Type: Passenger steamship
- Displacement: 3,674 tons load draught
- Tons burthen: 3,443 bm
- Length: 322 ft (98 m)
- Beam: 50 ft 6 in (15.39 m)
- Draught: 16 ft (4.88 m)
- Depth of hold: 32.5 ft (9.9 m)
- Installed power: 2 × twin 88-inch (220 cm) cylinder, bore, 6 ft (1.83 m) stroke, 500 hp (370 kW), 18 rpm inclined direct-acting steam engines
- Propulsion: Single screw propeller
- Sail plan: Original: Five schooner-rigged and one square-rigged mast; After 1853: Three square-rigged masts
- Speed: 10 to 11 knots (19 to 20 km/h; 12 to 13 mph)
- Capacity: 360 passengers, later increased to 730; 1,200 long tons (1,300 short tons; 1,200 t) of cargo
- Complement: 130 officers and crew (as completed)

SS Great Britain is a museum ship and former passenger steamship that was advanced for her time. The largest passenger ship in the world from 1845 to 1853, she was designed by Isambard Kingdom Brunel (1806–1859), for the Great Western Steamship Company's transatlantic service between Bristol and New York City. While other ships had previously been built of iron or equipped with a screw propeller, Great Britain was the first to combine these features in a large ocean-going ship, making her one of the most technologically advanced ships of her time. She was the first iron steamer to cross the Atlantic Ocean, which she did in 1845, in 14 days.

The ship is 322 ft (98 m) in length and has a 3,400-ton displacement. She was powered by two inclined two-cylinder engines of the direct-acting type, with twin cylinders 88 in (220 cm) bore, of 72 in (180 cm) stroke. She was also provided with secondary masts for sail power. The four decks provided accommodation for a crew of 120, plus 360 passengers who were provided with cabins, and dining and promenade saloons.

When launched in 1843, Great Britain was by far the largest vessel ever built. However, her protracted construction time of six years (1839–1845) and high cost had left her owners in a difficult financial position, and they were forced out of business in 1846, having spent all their remaining funds refloating the ship after she ran aground at Dundrum Bay in County Down near Newcastle in what is now Northern Ireland, after a navigation error. In 1852 she was sold for salvage and repaired. Great Britain later carried thousands of emigrants to Australia from 1852 until being converted to all-sail in 1881. Three years later, she was retired to the Falkland Islands, where she was used as a warehouse, quarantine ship and coal hulk until she was scuttled in 1937, 98 years after being laid down.

In 1970, after Great Britain had been abandoned for 33 years, Sir Jack Arnold Hayward, OBE (1923–2015) paid for the vessel to be raised and repaired enough to be towed north through the Atlantic back to the United Kingdom, and returned to the Bristol dry dock where she had been built 127 years earlier. Hayward was a prominent businessman, developer, philanthropist and owner of the English football club Wolverhampton Wanderers. Now listed as part of the National Historic Fleet, Great Britain is a visitor attraction and museum ship in Bristol Harbour, with 131,056 visitors in 2025.

== Development ==
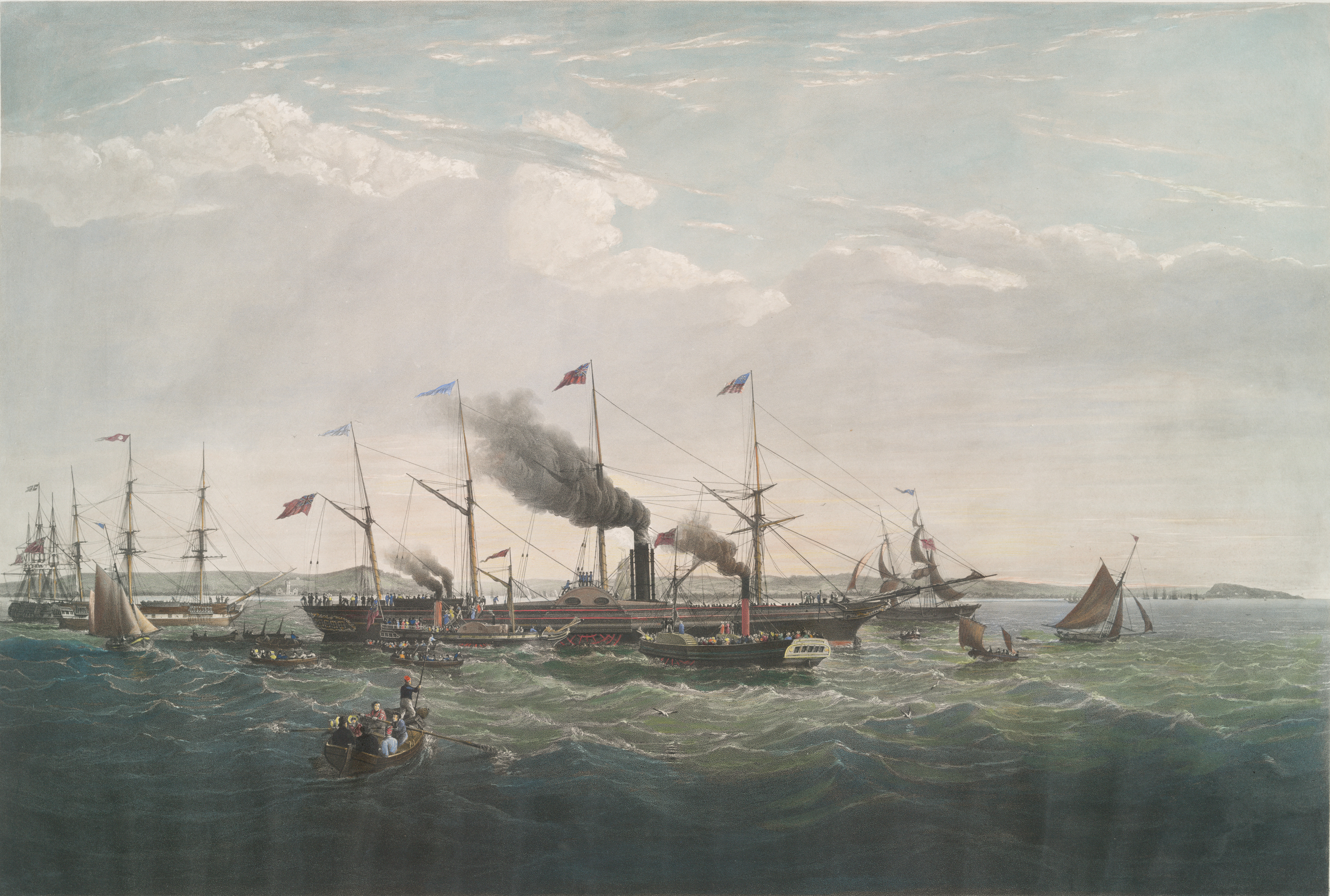
The SS Great Western on her maiden voyage

After the initial success of its first liner, SS Great Western of 1838, the Great Western Steamship Company collected materials for a sister ship, tentatively named City of New York. The same engineering team that had collaborated so successfully on Great Western—Isambard Kingdom Brunel, Thomas Guppy, Christopher Claxton and William Patterson—was again assembled. This time however, Brunel, whose reputation was at its height, came to assert overall control over the design of the ship—a state of affairs that would have far-reaching consequences for the company. Construction was carried out in a specially adapted dry dock in Bristol, England.

=== Adoption of iron hull ===
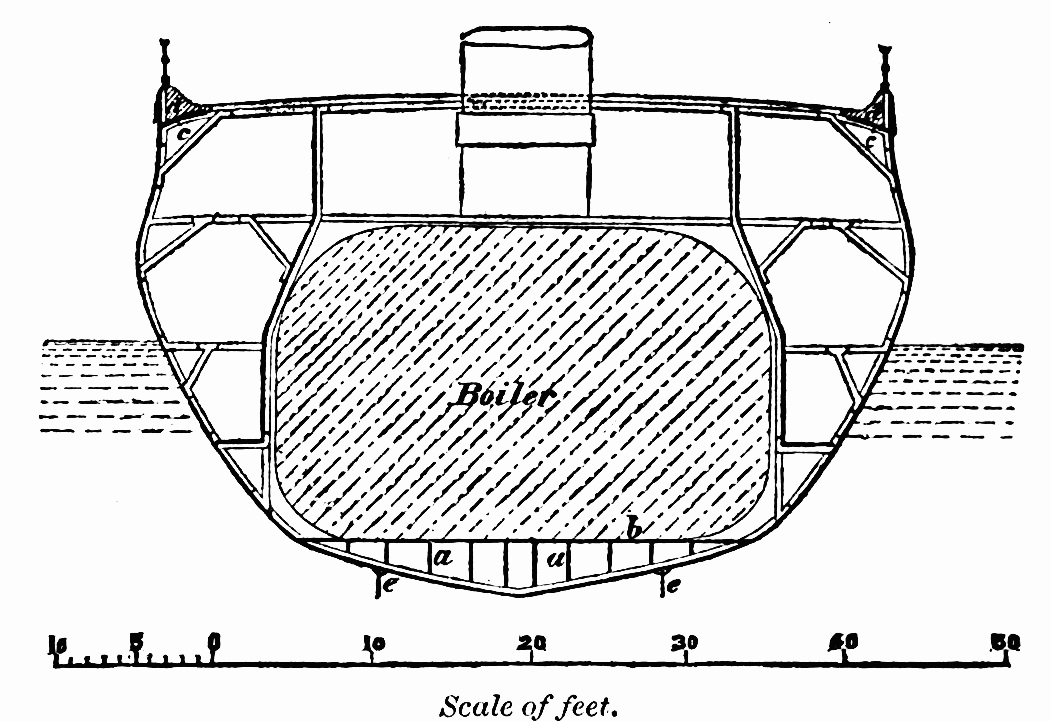
Hull section of the Great Britain, showing the boiler

Two chance encounters were profoundly to affect the design of Great Britain. In late 1838, John Laird's 213-foot (65 m) English Channel packet ship Rainbow—the largest iron-hulled ship then in service—made a stop at Bristol. Brunel dispatched his associates Christopher Claxton and William Patterson to make a return voyage to Antwerp on Rainbow to assess the utility of the new building material. Both men returned as converts to iron-hulled technology, and Brunel scrapped his plans to build a wooden ship and persuaded the company directors to build an iron-hulled ship. Great Britain's builders recognised a number of advantages of iron over the traditional wooden hull. Wood was becoming more expensive, while iron was getting cheaper. Iron hulls were not subject to dry rot or woodworm, and they were also lighter in weight and less bulky. The chief advantage of the iron hull was its much greater structural strength. The practical limit on the length of a wooden-hulled ship is about 300 ft (91 m), after which hogging—the flexing of the hull as waves pass beneath it—becomes too great. Iron hulls are far less subject to hogging so the potential size of an iron-hulled ship is much greater. The ship's designers, led by Brunel, were initially cautious in the adaptation of their plans to iron-hulled technology. With each successive draft however, the ship grew ever larger and bolder in conception. By the fifth draft, the vessel had grown to 3,400 long tons (3,500 t), over 1,000 long tons (1,000 t) larger than any ship then in existence.

=== Adoption of screw propulsion ===
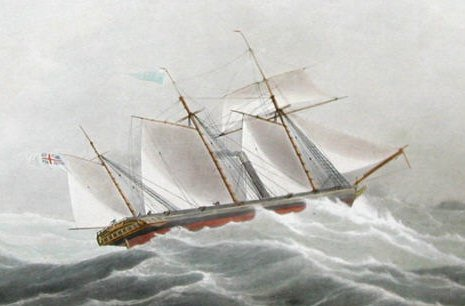
Artist's impression of SS Archimedes

In early 1840, a second chance encounter occurred, the arrival of the revolutionary SS Archimedes at Bristol, the first screw-propelled steamship, completed only a few months before by Francis Pettit Smith's Propeller Steamship Company. Brunel had been looking into methods of improving the performance of Great Britain's paddlewheels, and took an immediate interest in the new technology. Smith, sensing a prestigious new customer for his own company, agreed to lend Archimedes to Brunel for extended tests. Over several months, Smith and Brunel tested a number of different propellers on Archimedes to find the most efficient design, a four-bladed model submitted by Smith.

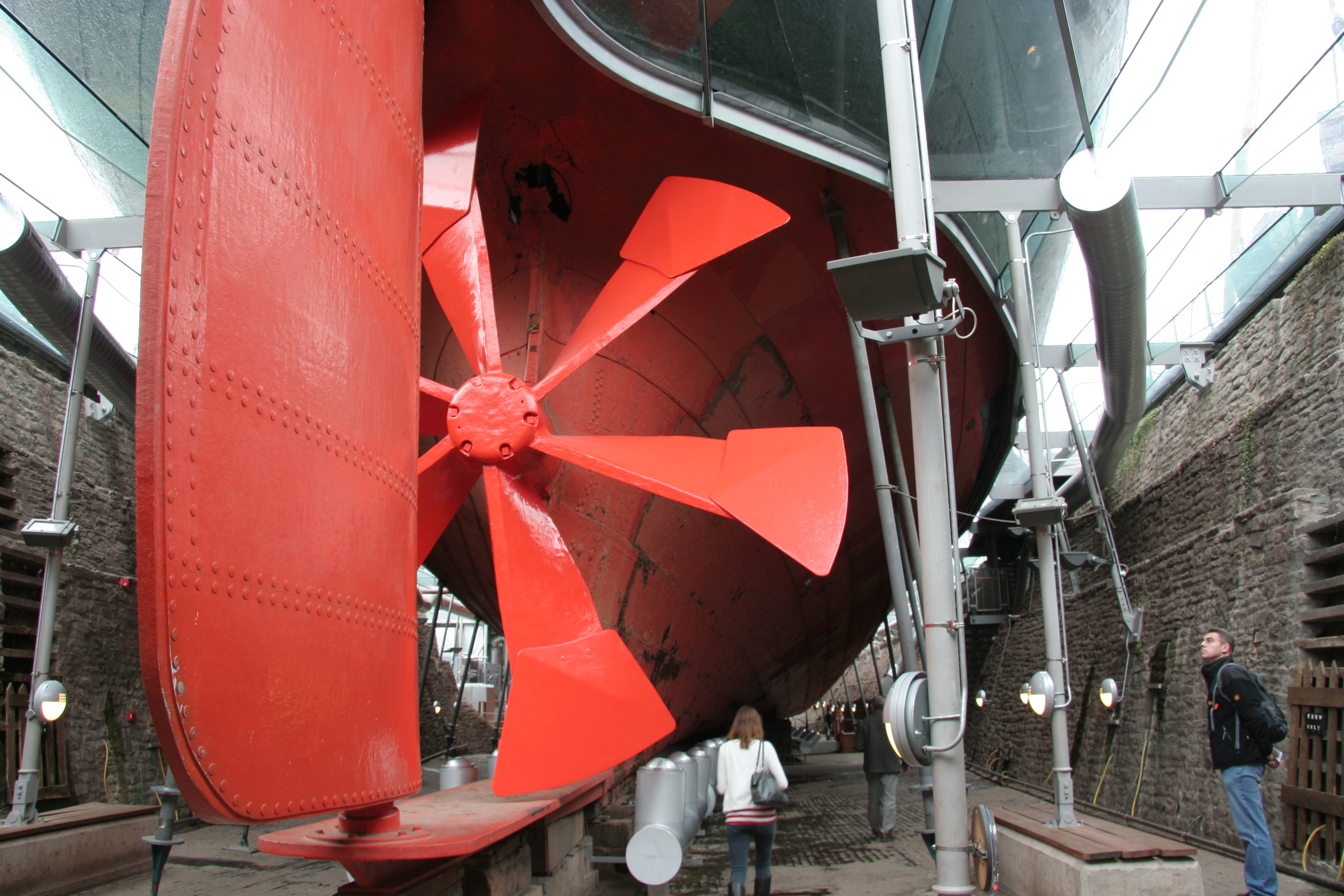
Replica of Great Britain's original six-bladed propeller on the museum ship. This propeller proved totally unsatisfactory in service and was quickly replaced with a four-bladed model.

Having satisfied himself as to the advantages of screw propulsion, Brunel wrote to the company directors to persuade them to embark on a second major design change, abandoning the paddlewheel engines (already half-constructed) for completely new engines suitable for powering a propeller.

Brunel listed the advantages of the screw propeller over the paddlewheel as follows:

- Screw propulsion machinery was lighter in weight, thus improving fuel economy;
- Screw propulsion machinery could be kept lower in the hull, lowering the ship's centre of gravity and making it more stable in heavy seas;
- By taking up less room, propeller engines would allow more cargo to be carried;
- Elimination of bulky paddle boxes would lessen resistance through the water, and also allow the ship to manoeuvre more easily in confined waterways;
- The depth of a paddlewheel is constantly changing, depending on the ship's cargo and the movement of waves, while a propeller stays fully submerged and at full efficiency at all times;
- Screw propulsion machinery was cheaper.

Brunel's arguments proved persuasive, and in December 1840, the company agreed to adopt the new technology. The decision became a costly one, setting the ship's completion back by nine months.

Reporting on the ship's arrival in New York, in its first issue Scientific American opined, "If there is any thing objectionable in the construction or machinery of this noble ship, it is the mode of propelling her by the screw propeller; and we should not be surprised if it should be, ere long, superseded by paddle wheels at the sides."

== Launch ==
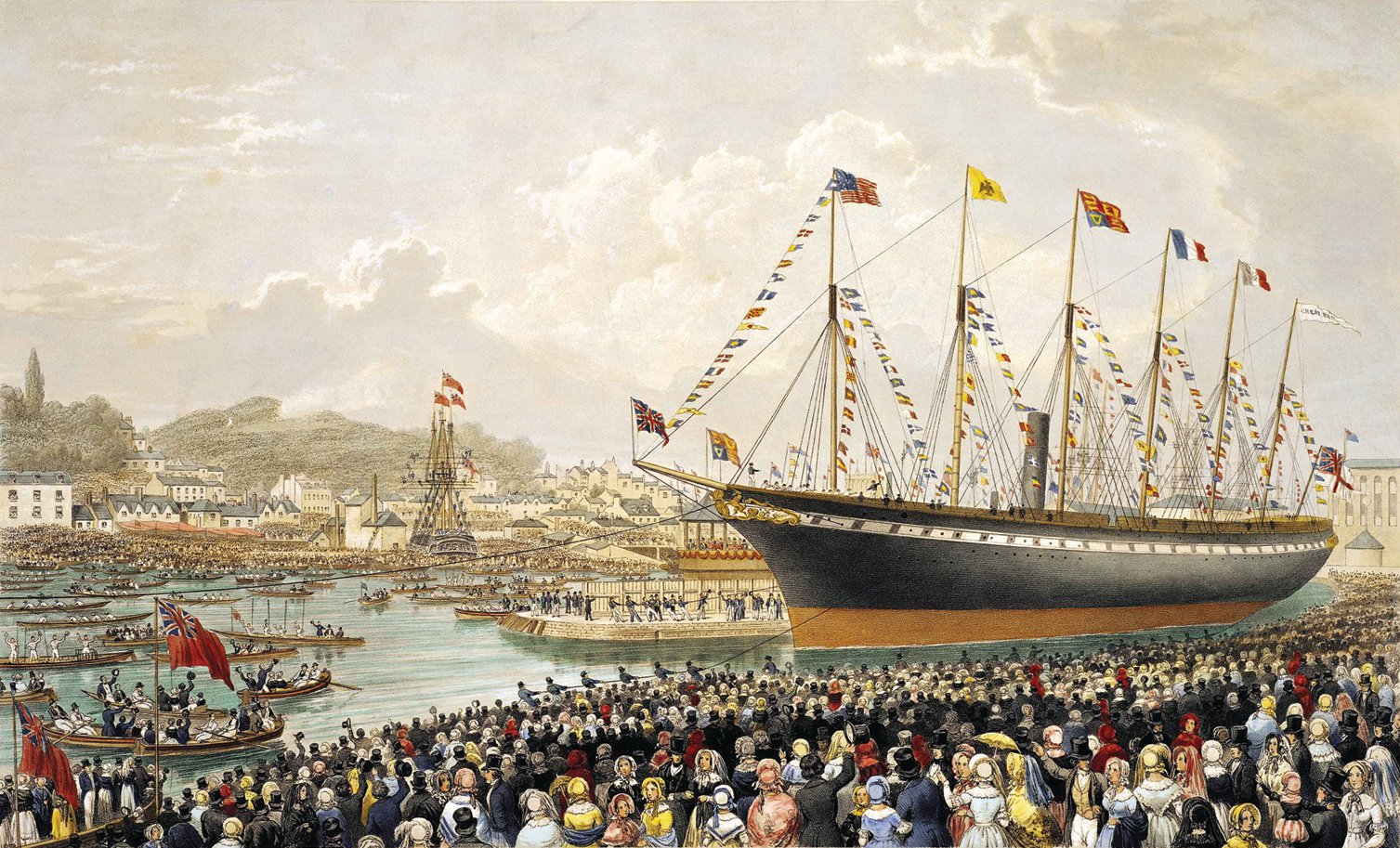
A painting of the launch in 1843

The launching or, more accurately, the float-out took place on 19 July 1843. Conditions were generally favourable and diarists recorded that, after a dull start, the weather brightened with only a few intermittent showers. The atmosphere of the day can best be gauged from a report the following day in The Bristol Mirror:

Large crowds started to gather early in the day including many people who had travelled to Bristol to see the spectacle. There was a general atmosphere of anticipation as the Royal Emblem was unfurled. The processional route had been cleaned and Temple Street decorated with flags, banners, flowers and ribbons. Boys of the City School and girls of Red Maids were stationed in a neat orderly formation down the entire length of the Exchange. The route was a mass of colour and everybody was out on the streets as it was a public holiday. The atmosphere of gaiety even allowed thoughts to drift away from the problems of political dissension in London.

Prince Albert arrived at 10 a.m. at the Great Western Railway terminus. The royal train, conducted by Brunel himself, had taken two hours and forty minutes from London. There was a guard of honour of members of the police force, soldiers and dragoons and, as the Prince stepped from the train, the band of the Life Guards played works by Labitsky and a selection from the "Ballet of Alma". Two sections of the platform were boarded off for the reception and it was noted by The Bristol Mirror that parts were covered with carpets from the Council House. The Prince Consort, dressed as a private gentleman, was accompanied by his equerry-in-waiting, personal secretary, the Marquess of Exeter, and Lords Wharncliffe, Liverpool, Lincoln and Wellesley.

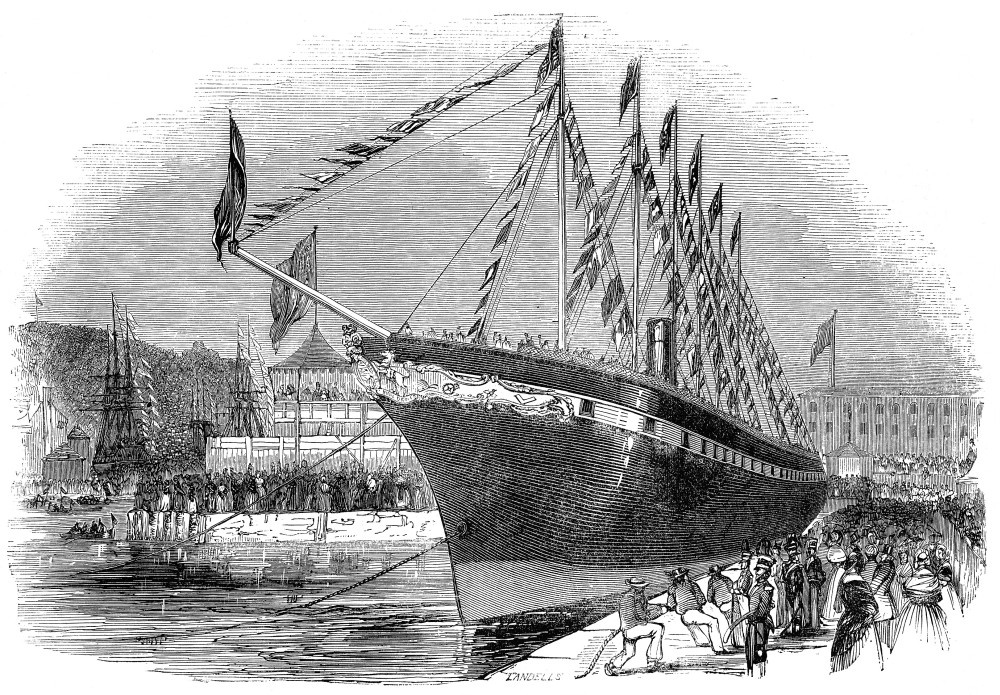
Launch of Great Britain at Bristol, July 1843

Introductions were made, followed by the "Address to His Royal Highness the Prince Albert", by the town clerk, D. Burgess. Honours were then bestowed on him by the Society of Merchant Venturers, and there were speeches from members of the Bristol clergy. The royal party then had breakfast and, after 20 minutes, reappeared to board horse-drawn carriages.

At noon, the Prince arrived at the Great Western Steamship yard only to find the ship already "launched" and waiting for royal inspection. He boarded the ship, took refreshments in the elegantly decorated lounge then commenced his tour of inspection. He was received in the ship's banqueting room where all the local dignitaries and their ladies were gathered.

After the banquet and the toasts, he left for the naming ceremony. It had already been decided that the christening would be performed by Clarissa (1790–1868), wife of Philip John Miles (1773–1845) and mother of Bristol's MP, Philip William Skinner Miles (1816–1881), a director of the company. She stepped forward, grasped the champagne bottle and swung it towards the bows. Unfortunately, the steam packet Avon (which also had an iron hull and screw propulsion and had been launched by Stothert, Slaughter & Co. earlier the same year) had started to tow the ship into the harbour and the bottle fell about 10 feet (3.0 m) short of its target and dropped unbroken into the water. A second bottle was rapidly obtained and the Prince hurled it against the iron hull.

In her haste, Avon had started her work before the shore warps had been released. The tow rope snapped and, due to the resultant delay, the Prince was obliged to return to the railway station and miss the end of the programme.

=== Another extended delay ===
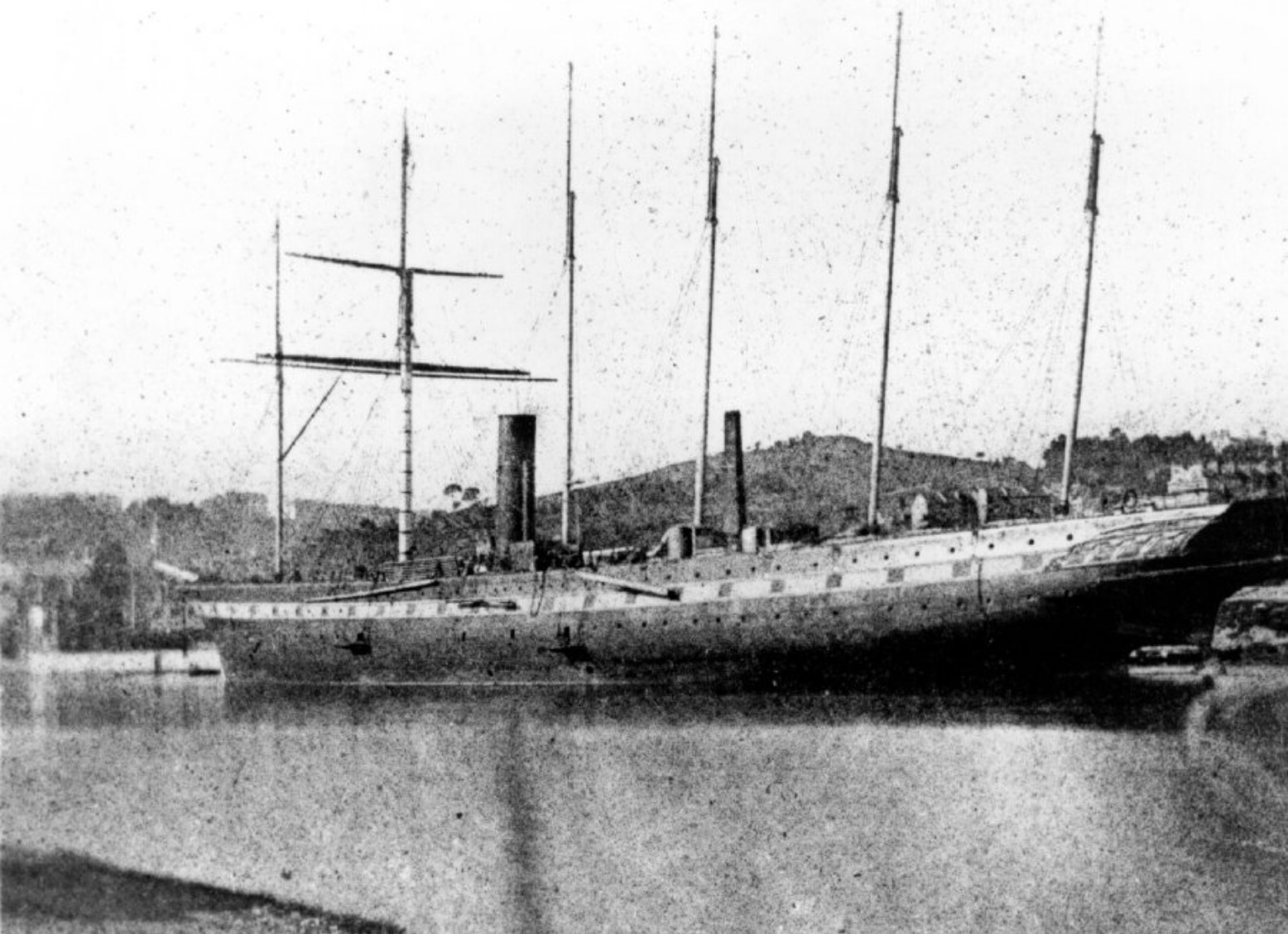
Fitting out in the Bristol Floating Harbour, April 1844. This historic photograph by William Talbot is believed to be the first ever photo of an ocean liner.

Following the launch ceremony, the builders had planned to have Great Britain towed to the Avon for her final fitting out. Unfortunately, the harbour authorities had failed to carry out the necessary modifications to their facilities in a timely manner. Exacerbating the problem, the ship had been widened beyond the original plans to accommodate the propeller engines, and her designers had made a belated decision to fit the engines prior to launch, which resulted in a deeper draught.

This dilemma was to result in another costly delay for the company, as Brunel's negotiations with the Bristol Dock Board dragged on for months. It was only through the intervention of the Board of Trade that the harbour authorities finally agreed to the lock modifications, which began in late 1844.

After being trapped in the harbour for more than a year, Great Britain was, at last, floated out in December 1844, but not before causing more anxiety for her proprietors. After passing successfully through the first set of lock gates, she jammed on her passage through the second, which led to the River Avon. Only the seamanship of Captain Claxton - who after naval service held the position of quay warden (harbour master) at Bristol - enabled her to be pulled back and severe structural damage avoided. The following day an army of workmen, under the direct control of Brunel, took advantage of the slightly higher tide and removed coping stones and lock gate platforms from the Junction Lock, allowing the tug Samson, again under Claxton's supervision, to tow the ship safely into the Avon that midnight.

== Description ==
=== General description ===
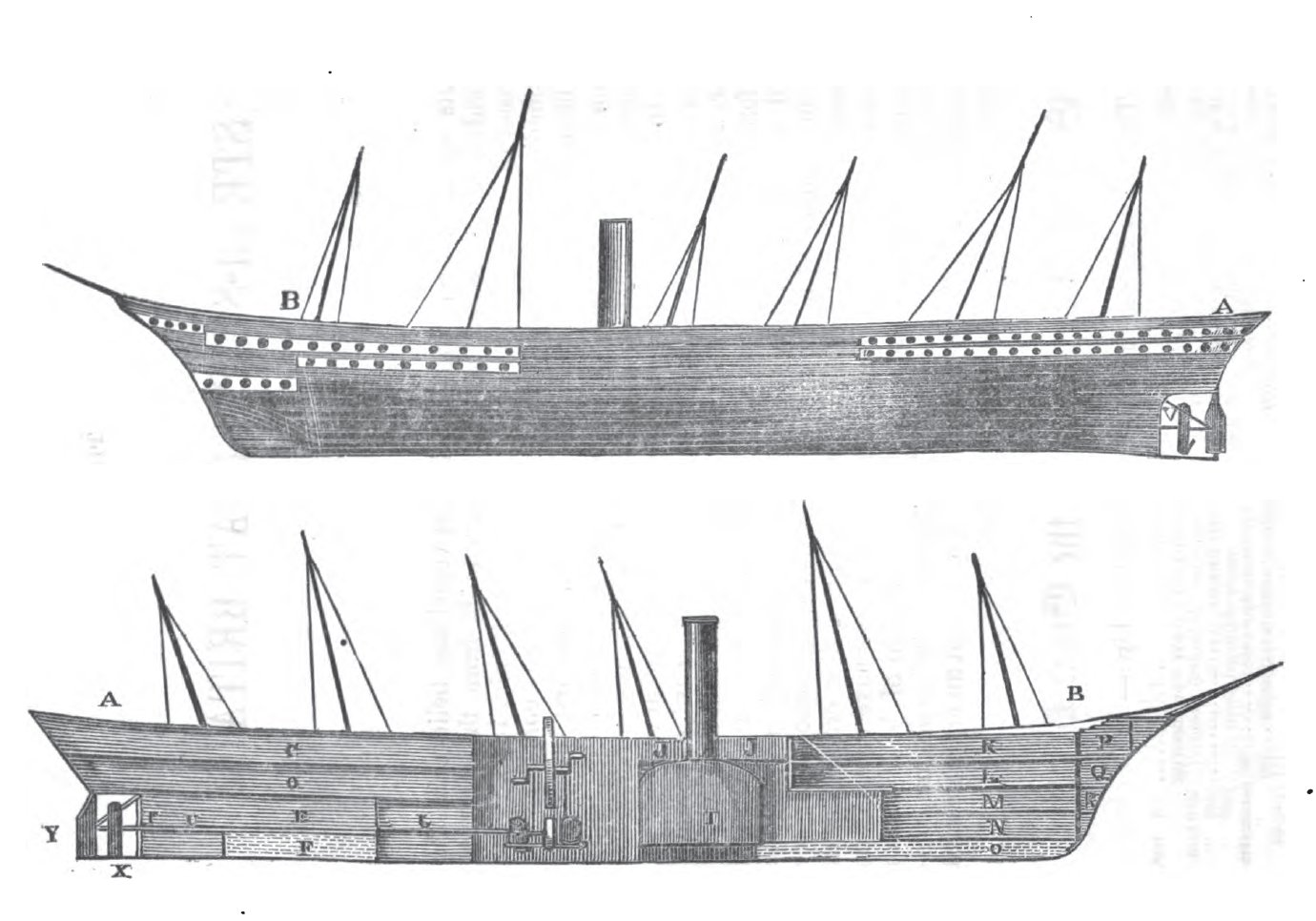
Sketch of Great Britain. The lower image shows the internal arrangement of her decks and machinery.

When completed in 1845, Great Britain was a revolutionary vessel—the first ship to combine an iron hull with screw propulsion, and at 322 ft (98 m) in length and with a 3,400-ton displacement, more than 100 ft (30 m) longer and 1,000 tons larger than any ship previously built. Her beam was 50 ft 6 in (15.39 m) and her height from keel to main deck, 32 ft 6 in (9.91 m). She had four decks, including the spar (upper) deck, a crew of 120, and was fitted to accommodate a total of 360 passengers, along with 1,200 tons of cargo and 1,200 tons of coal for fuel.

Like other steamships of the era, Great Britain was provided with secondary sail power, consisting of one square-rigged and five schooner-rigged masts—a relatively simple sail plan designed to reduce the number of crew required. The masts were of iron, fastened to the spar deck with iron joints, and with one exception, hinged to allow their lowering to reduce wind resistance in the event of a strong headwind. The rigging was of iron cable instead of the traditional hemp, again with a view to reducing wind resistance. Another innovative feature was the lack of traditional heavy bulwarks around the main deck; a light iron railing both reduced weight and allowed water shipped in heavy weather to run unimpeded back to sea.

The hull and single funnel amidships were both finished in black paint, with a single white stripe running the length of the hull highlighting a row of false gunports. The hull was flat-bottomed, with no external keel, and with bulges low on each side amidships which continued toward the stern in an unusual implementation of tumblehome—a result of the late decision to install propeller engines, which were wider at the base than the originally planned paddlewheel engines.

Brunel, anxious to ensure the avoidance of hogging in a vessel of such unprecedented size, designed the hull to be massively redundant in strength. Ten longitudinal iron girders were installed along the keel, running from beneath the engines and boiler to the forward section. The iron ribs were 6 by 3 inches (15.2 cm × 7.6 cm) in size. The iron keel plates were an inch thick, and the hull seams were lapped and double riveted in many places. Safety features, which also contributed to the structural strength of the vessel, included a double bottom and five watertight iron bulkheads. The total amount of iron, including the engines and machinery, was 1,500 tons.

=== Machinery ===
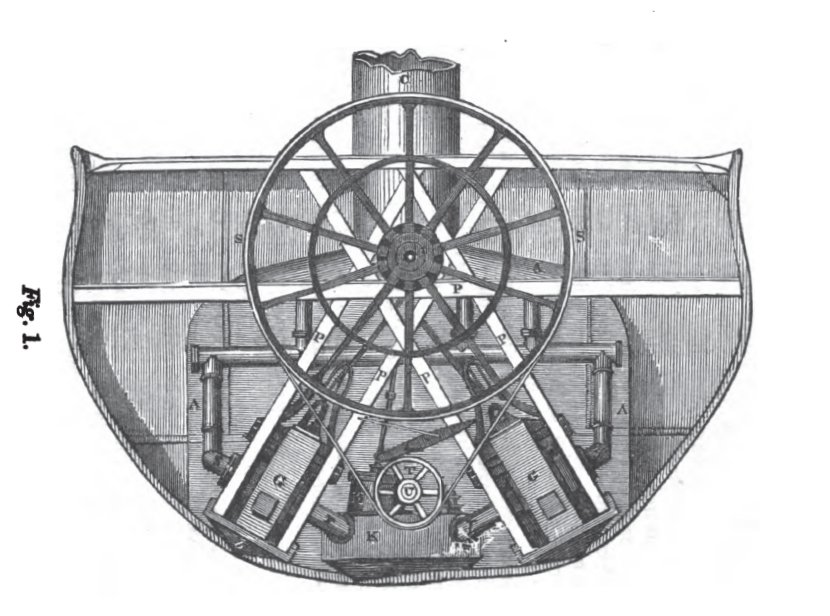
Transverse hull section, showing arrangement of gearwheels, gear chains and engine cylinders

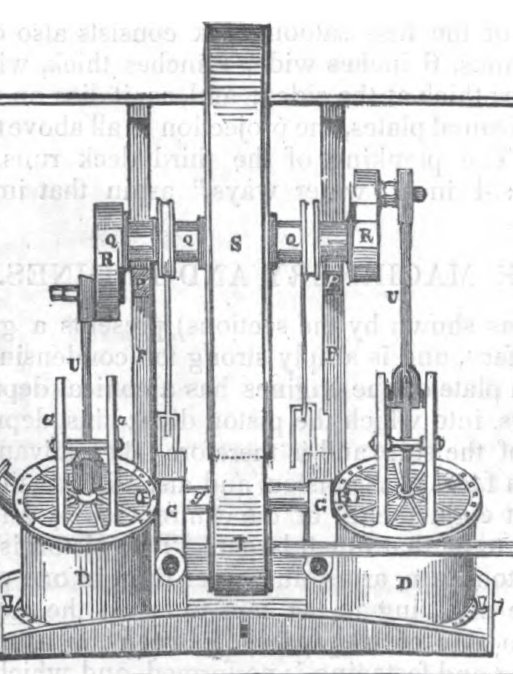
Side view of engines, showing arrangement of gears and gear chains between the engines

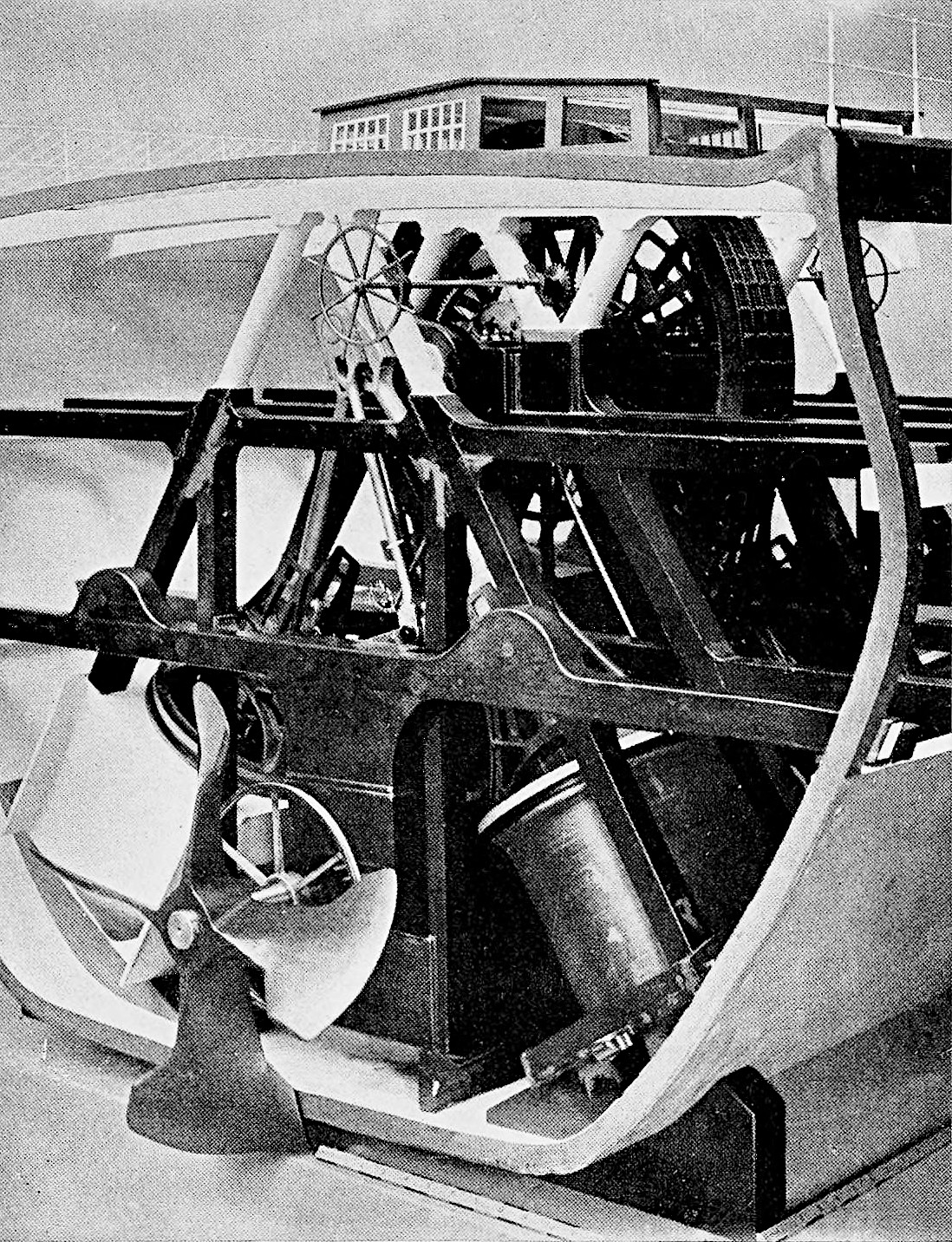
A model of Great Britain's engines

Two giant propeller engines, with a combined weight of 340 tons, were installed amidships. They were built to a modified patent of Brunel's father Marc. The engines, which rose from the keel through the three lower decks to a height just below the main deck, were of the direct-acting type, with twin 88 in (220 cm) bore, 6-foot (1.8 m) stroke cylinders inclined upward at a 60° angle, capable of developing a total of 1,000 horsepower (750 kW) at 18 rpm. Steam power was provided by three 34-foot (10 m) long by 22-foot (6.7 m) high by 10-foot (3.0 m) wide, 5 psi (34 kPa) "square" saltwater boilers, forward of the engines, with eight furnaces each – four at each end. (Note: Some sources, such as Claxton, state that there was only a single boiler, but others, such as Fletcher and Maginnis, state that there were three side by side. This apparent discrepancy is explained by the fact that there were three separate boilers or boiler compartments sharing a common housing.)

In considering the gearing arrangement, Brunel had no precedent to serve as a guide. The gearing for Archimedes, of the spur-and-pinion type, had proven almost unbearably noisy, and would not be suitable for a passenger ship. Brunel's solution was to install a chain drive. On the crankshaft between Great Britain's two engines, he installed an 18-foot (5.5 m) diameter primary gearwheel, which, by means of a set of four massive inverted-tooth or "silent" chains, operated the smaller secondary gear near the keel, which turned the propeller shaft. This was the first commercial use of silent chain technology, and the individual silent chains installed in Great Britain are thought to have been the largest ever constructed.

Great Britain's main propeller shaft, built by the Mersey Iron Works, was the largest single piece of machinery. 68 ft (21 m) long and 28 inches (71 cm) in diameter, the shaft was bored with a 10-inch-diameter (25 cm) hole, reducing its weight and allowing cold water to be pumped through to reduce heat. At each end of the main propeller shaft were two secondary coupling shafts: a 28-foot (8.5 m), 16-inch (41 cm) diameter shaft beneath the engine, and a screw shaft of 25 ft (7.6 m) in length and with a diameter of 16 inches (41 cm) at the stern. Total length of the three shafts was 130 ft (40 m), and the total weight 38 tons. The shaft was geared upward at a ratio of 1 to 3, so that at the engines' normal operating speed of 18 rpm, the propeller turned at a speed of 54 rpm. The initial propeller was a six-bladed "windmill" model of Brunel's own design, 16 ft (4.9 m) in diameter and with pitch of 25 ft (7.6 m).

=== Interior ===
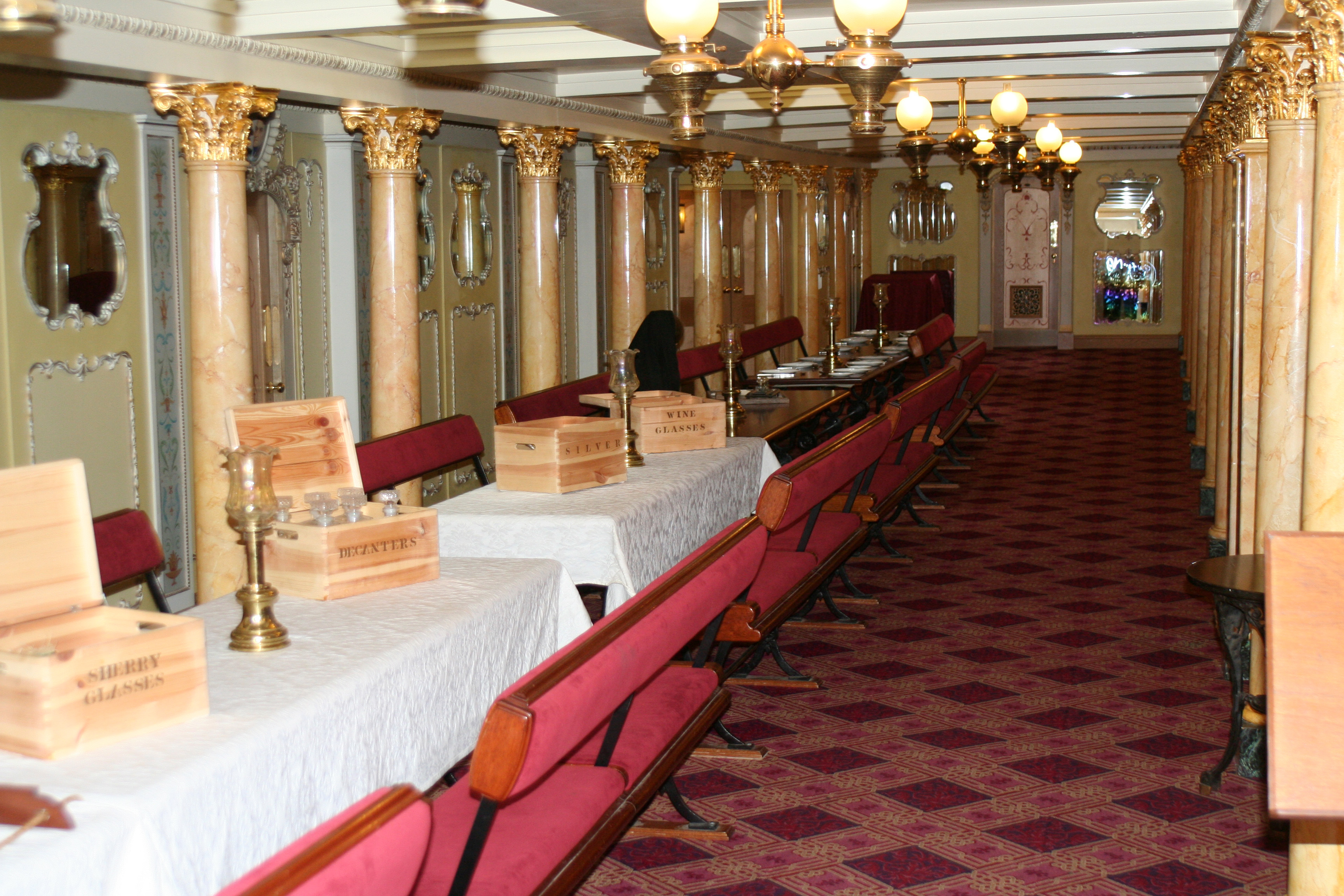
Looking down one aisle of the reconstructed dining saloon in the museum ship SS Great Britain

The interior was divided into three decks, the upper two for passengers and the lower for cargo. The two passenger decks were divided into forward and aft compartments, separated by the engines and boiler amidships.

In the aft section of the ship, the upper passenger deck contained the after or principal saloon, 110 ft (34 m) long by 48 ft (15 m) wide, which ran from just aft of the engine room to the stern. On each side of the saloon were corridors leading to 22 individual passenger berths, arranged two deep, a total of 44 berths for the saloon as a whole. The forward part of the saloon, nearest the engine room, contained two 17-by-14-foot (5.2 m × 4.3 m) ladies' boudoirs or private sitting rooms, which could be accessed without entering the saloon from the 12 nearest passenger berths, reserved for women. The opposite end of the saloon opened onto the stern windows. Broad iron staircases at both ends of the saloon ran to the main deck above and the dining saloon below. The saloon was painted in "delicate tints", furnished along its length with fixed chairs of oak, and supported by 12 decorated pillars.

Beneath the after saloon was the main or dining saloon, 98 ft 6 in (30.02 m) long by 30 ft (9.1 m) wide, with dining tables and chairs capable of accommodating up to 360 people at one sitting. On each side of the saloon, seven corridors opened onto four berths each, for a total number of berths per side of 28, or 56 altogether. The forward end of the saloon was connected to a stewards' galley, while the opposite end contained several tiers of sofas. This saloon was apparently the ship's most impressive of all the passenger spaces. Columns of white and gold, 24 in number, with "ornamental capitals of great beauty", were arranged down its length and along the walls, while eight Arabesque pilasters, decorated with "beautifully painted" oriental flowers and birds, enhanced the aesthetic effect. The archways of the doors were "tastefully carved and gilded" and surmounted with medallion heads. Mirrors around the walls added an illusion of spaciousness, and the walls themselves were painted in a "delicate lemon-tinted hue" with highlights of blue and gold.

The two forward saloons were arranged in a similar plan to the after saloons, with the upper "promenade" saloon having 36 berths per side and the lower 30, totalling 132. Further forward, separate from the passenger saloons, were the crew quarters. The overall finish of the passenger quarters was unusually restrained for its time, a probable reflection of the proprietors' diminishing capital reserves. Total cost of construction of the ship, not including £53,000 for plant and equipment to build her, was £117,000—£47,000 more than her original projected price tag of £70,000.

== Service history ==
=== Transatlantic service ===
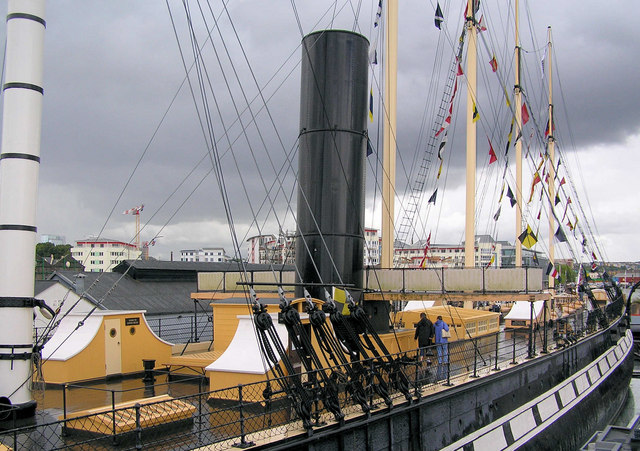
The main funnel

On 26 July 1845—seven years after the Great Western Steamship Company had decided to build a second ship, and five years overdue—Great Britain embarked on her maiden voyage, from Liverpool to New York under Captain James Hosken, with 45 passengers. The ship made the passage in 14 days and 21 hours, at an average speed of 9.25 knots (17.13 km/h; 10.64 mph) – almost 1.5 knots (2.8 km/h; 1.7 mph) slower than the prevailing record. She made the return trip in 13 1/2 days, again an unexceptional time.

Brunel, who prior to commencement of service had substituted a six-bladed "windmill" design of his own for Smith's proven four-bladed propeller design, now decided to try to improve the speed by riveting an extra two inches of iron to each propeller blade. On her next crossing to New York, carrying 104 passengers, the ship ran into heavy weather, losing a mast and three propeller blades. On 13 October, she ran aground on the Massachusetts Shoals. She was refloated and after obtaining a supply of coal from the American schooner David Coffin resumed her voyage. After repairs in New York, she set out for Liverpool with only 28 passengers and lost four propeller blades during the crossing. By this time, another design flaw had become evident. The ship rolled heavily, especially in calm weather without the steadying influence of the sail, causing discomfort to passengers.

The shareholders of the company again provided further funding to try to solve the problems. The six-bladed propeller was dispensed with and replaced with the original four-bladed, cast iron design. The third mast was removed, and the iron rigging, which had proven unsatisfactory, was replaced with conventional rigging. In a major alteration, two 110-foot-long (34 m) bilge keels were added to each side in an effort to lessen her tendency to roll. These repairs and alterations delayed her return to service until the following year.

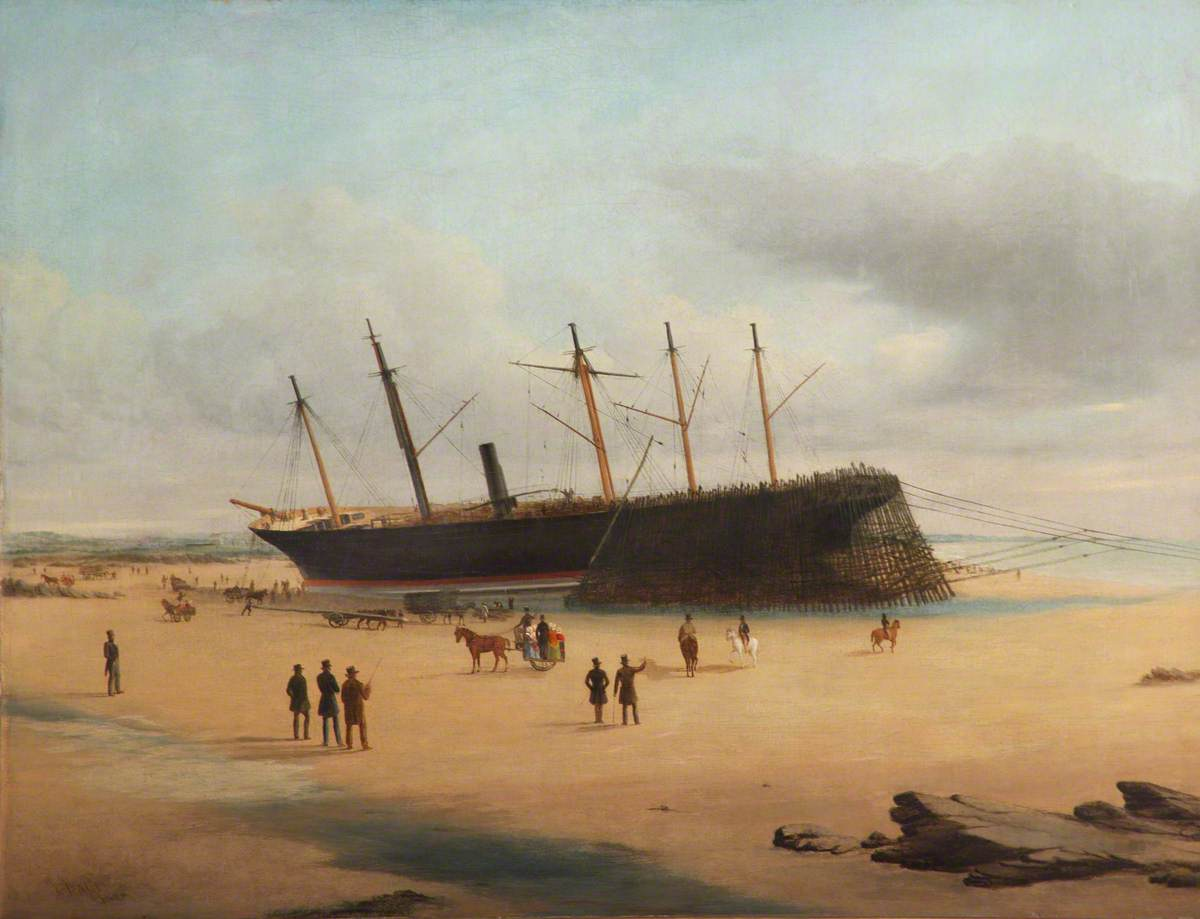
Stranded in Dundrum Bay, 1846

In her second season of service in 1846, Great Britain successfully completed two round trips to New York at an acceptable speed.

She left Liverpool on 6 July 1846, for her sixth overall voyage, the second voyage that year, across the Atlantic, which she made in 16 days, arriving in New York on 21 July. She took only first-class passengers. Captain Hosken brought 125 crew and 102 passengers among whom was 32-year-old printer Philip Borbeck, born in Gensungen, Felsberg, Hesse-Cassel in 1814, an immigrant who was returning home to Philadelphia from a visit to his birthplace in Germany. When Borbeck died in Philadelphia in 1897, he left an estate worth $15 million today.

The ship was then laid up for repairs to one of her chain drums, which showed an unexpected degree of wear. Embarking on her third passage of the season to New York, her captain made a series of navigational errors that resulted in her being run hard aground in Dundrum Bay on the northeast coast of Ireland on 22 September. There was no formal inquiry but it has been recently suggested by Dr Helen Doe in her book SS Great Britain that it was mainly due to the captain not having updated charts, so that he mistook the new St John's light for the Calf light on the Isle of Man.

She remained aground for almost a year, protected by temporary measures organised by Brunel and James Bremner. On 25 August 1847, she was floated free at a cost of £34,000 and taken back to Liverpool, but this expense exhausted the company's remaining reserves. After languishing in Prince's Dock, Liverpool for some time, she was sold to Gibbs, Bright & Co., former agents of the Great Western Steamship Company, for a mere £25,000.

==== Refit and return to service ====
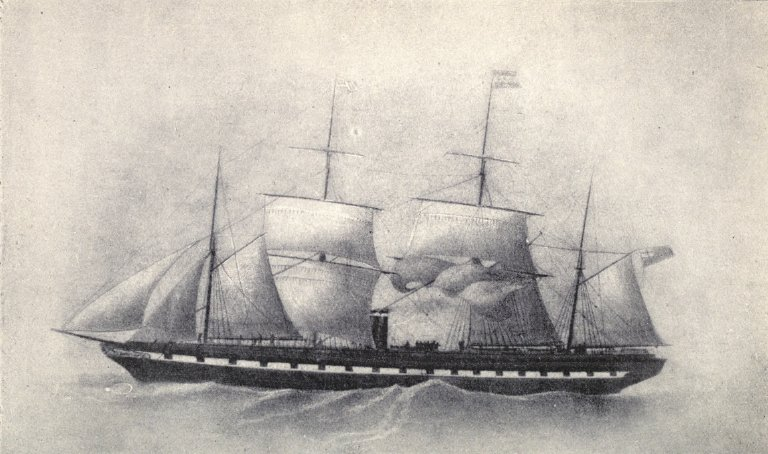
Great Britain in 1853, after her refit to four masts

The new owners decided not merely to give the vessel a total refit; the keel, badly damaged during the grounding, was completely renewed along a length of 150 feet (46 m), and the owners took the opportunity to further strengthen the hull. The old keelsons were replaced and 10 new ones laid, which ran the entire length of the keel. Both the bow and stern were also strengthened by heavy frames of double angle iron.

Reflecting the rapid advances in propeller engine technology, the original engines were removed and replaced with a pair of smaller, lighter and more modern oscillating engines, with 82.5-inch (210 cm) cylinders and 6-foot (180 cm) stroke, built by John Penn & Sons of Greenwich. They were also provided with more support at the base and supported further by the addition of both iron and wood beams running transversely across the hull, which had the added benefit of reducing engine vibration.

The cumbersome chain-drive gearing was replaced with a simpler and by now proven cog-wheel arrangement, although the gearing of the engines to the propeller shaft remained at a ratio of one to three. The three large boilers were replaced with six smaller ones, operating at 10 psi (69 kPa) or twice the pressure of their predecessors. Along with a new 300-foot (91 m) cabin on the main deck, the smaller boilers allowed the cargo capacity to be almost doubled, from 1,200 to 2,200 tons.

The four-bladed propeller was replaced by a slightly smaller three-bladed model, and the bilge keels, previously added to reduce the tendency to roll, were replaced by a heavy external oak keel for the same purpose. The five-masted schooner sail-plan was replaced by four masts, two of which were square-rigged. With the refit complete, Great Britain went back into service on the New York run. After only one further round trip she was sold again, to Antony Gibbs & Sons, which planned to place her into England–Australia service.

=== Australian service ===
Antony Gibbs & Sons may have intended to employ Great Britain only to exploit a temporary demand for passenger service to the Australian goldfields following the discovery of gold in Victoria in 1851, but she found long-term employment on this route. For her new role, she was given a third refit. Her passenger accommodation was increased from 360 to 730, and her sail plan altered to a traditional three-masted, square-rigged pattern. She was fitted with a removable propeller, which could be hauled up on deck by chains to reduce drag when under sail power alone.

In 1852, Great Britain made her first voyage to Melbourne, Australia, carrying 630 emigrants. She excited great interest there, with 4,000 people paying a shilling each to inspect her. She operated on the England–Australia route for almost 30 years, interrupted only by two relatively brief sojourns as a troopship during the Crimean War and the Indian Mutiny. Gradually, she earned a reputation as the most reliable of the emigrant ships to Australia and carried the first English cricket team to tour Australia in 1861.

Alexander Reid, writing in 1862, recorded some statistics of a typical voyage. The ship, with a crew of 143, put out from Liverpool on 21 October 1861, carrying 544 passengers (including the English cricket team that was the first to visit Australia), a cow, 36 sheep, 140 pigs, 96 goats and 1,114 chickens, ducks, geese and turkeys. The journey to Melbourne (her ninth) occupied 64 days, during which the best day's run was 354 miles and the worst 108. With favourable winds the ship travelled under sail alone, the screw being withdrawn from the water. Three passengers died en route. The captain was John Gray, a Scot, who had held the post since before the Crimean War.

On 8 December 1863, she was reported to have been wrecked on Santiago, Cape Verde Islands whilst on a voyage from London to Nelson, New Zealand. All on board were rescued.

Her passengers and crew witnessed a total solar eclipse in 1865 while passing the coastline of Brazil en route from Australia to England; they were able to observe stars in the daytime.

On 8 October 1868 The Argus reported "To-day, at daylight, the fine steamship Great Britain will leave her anchorage in Hobson's Bay, for Liverpool direct. On this occasion she carries less than her usual complement of passengers, the season not being a favourite one with colonists desiring to visit their native land. Great Britain, however, has a full cargo, and carries gold to the value of about £250,000. As she is in fine trim, we shall probably have, in due time, to congratulate Captain Gray on having achieved another successful voyage." Gray died under mysterious circumstances, going missing overnight during a return voyage from Melbourne, on the night of 25/26 November 1872. On 22 December, she rescued the crew of the British brig Druid, which had been abandoned in the Atlantic Ocean. On 19 November 1874, she collided with the British ship Mysore in the Sloyne, losing an anchor and sustaining hull damage. Great Britain was on a voyage from Melbourne to Liverpool.

=== Later history ===
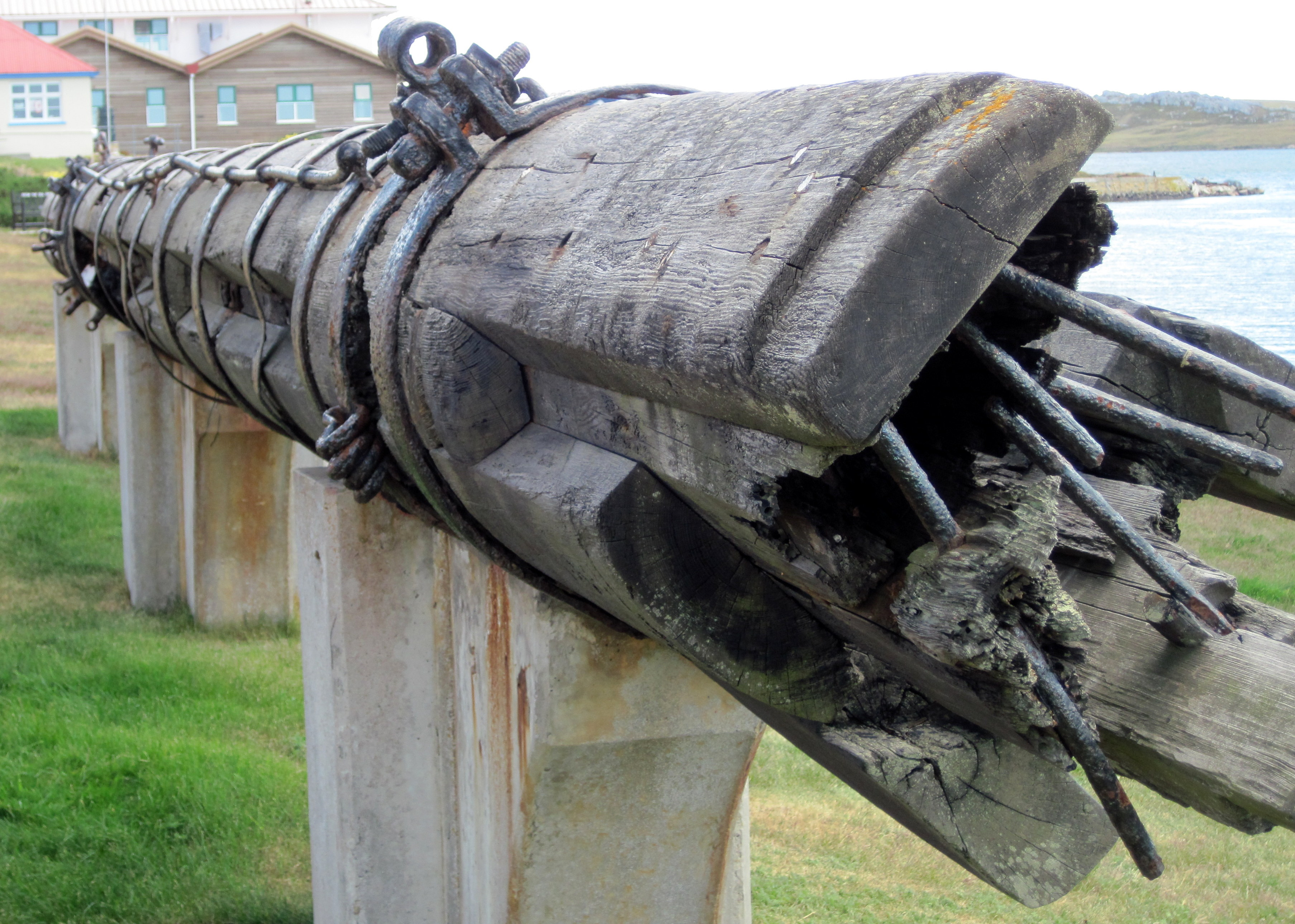
The ship's mizzen mast in Port Stanley

In 1882 Great Britain was converted into a sailing ship to transport bulk coal. The work was done by Messrs. C. & E. Grayson, Liverpool. She made her final voyage in 1886, after loading up with coal and leaving Penarth Dock in Wales for San Francisco on 8 February. After a fire on board en route she was found, on arrival at Port Stanley in the Falkland Islands where she ran aground, to be damaged beyond economic repair. She was sold to the Falkland Islands Company and used, afloat, as a storage hulk (coal bunker) until 1937, when she was towed to Sparrow Cove, 3.5 miles (5.6 km) from Port Stanley, scuttled and abandoned. As a bunker, she coaled the South Atlantic fleet that defeated Admiral Graf Maximilian von Spee's fleet in the First World War Battle of the Falkland Islands. In the Second World War, some of her iron was scavenged to repair HMS Exeter, one of the Royal Navy ships that fought Graf Spee and was badly damaged during the Battle of the River Plate.

=== Notable passengers and crew ===
The Great Britain carried over 33,000 people during her working life. These included:

- Gustavus Vaughan Brooke, Irish stage actor; travelled with Avonia Jones between Melbourne and Liverpool in 1861
- Fanny Duberly, author and chronicler of the Crimean War and the Indian Rebellion of 1857; travelled between Cork and Mumbai in 1857
- Colonel Sir George Everest, British surveyor and geographer; served as Surveyor General of India; namesake of Mount Everest; travelled between Liverpool and New York in 1845
- John Gray, Scottish born seaman; the Great Britain's longest serving captain; mysteriously disappeared while at sea; crew member 1852–1872
- James Hosken, first captain of the Great Britain and before that the Great Western from her maiden voyage until she ran aground in Dundrum Bay
- Avonia Jones, American actress, travelled with Gustavus Vaughan Brooke between Melbourne and Liverpool in 1861
- Sister Mary Paul Mulquin, Roman Catholic nun and educationalist; travelled between Liverpool and Melbourne in 1873
- Elizabeth Parsons, English-Australian artist, travelled between Liverpool and Melbourne in 1870.
- Anthony Trollope, English novelist of the Victorian era; travelled between Liverpool and Melbourne in 1871, and wrote Lady Anna during the voyage
- Augustus Arkwright, Royal Navy officer and a Conservative Party politician, and great-grandson of Richard Arkwright, travelled between Liverpool and New York in 1852.
- George Inness, prominent American landscape painter, travelled with his wife between Liverpool and New York in 1852.
- Henry Arthur Bright, English merchant and author, and partner in Gibbs, Bright & Co., travelled between Liverpool and New York in 1852.
- John Simcoe Macaulay, businessman and political figure in Upper Canada, travelled between Liverpool and New York in 1852.
- William Charles (fur trader), Pacific coast pioneer, Hudson's Bay Company factor, and a prominent figure in the early history of British Columbia, travelled between Liverpool and New York in 1852.
- Francis Pettit Smith, one of the inventors of the screw propeller, travelled between Liverpool and New York in 1852.
- James Edward Alexander, Scottish explorer, author and soldier, travelled between Melbourne and Liverpool in 1862, publishing a weekly newspaper aboard the ship

== Recovery and restoration ==
Hulk of Great Britain on the pontoon Mulus III, 1970

The salvage operation, made possible by several large donations, including from Sir Jack Hayward and Sir Paul Getty, was organised by 'the SS Great Britain Project', chaired by Richard Goold-Adams. Ewan Corlett conducted a naval architect's survey, reporting that she could be refloated. A submersible pontoon, Mulus III, was chartered in February 1970. A German tug, Varius II, was chartered, reaching Port Stanley on 25 March. By 13 April, after some concern about a crack in the hull, the ship was mounted successfully on the pontoon and the following day the tug, pontoon and Great Britain sailed to Port Stanley for preparations for the transatlantic voyage. The voyage (code name "Voyage 47") began on 24 April, stopped in Montevideo from 2 May to 6 May for inspection, then across the Atlantic, arriving at Barry Docks, west of Cardiff on 22 June. ("Voyage 47" was chosen as the code name because it was on her 47th voyage from Penarth, in 1886, that during a tempest she had sought shelter in the Falklands.) Bristol-based tugs then took over and towed her, still on her pontoon, to Avonmouth Docks.

The ship was then taken off the pontoon, in preparation for her re-entry into Bristol, now truly afloat. On Sunday 5 July, amidst considerable media interest, the ship was towed up the River Avon to Bristol. In the final few miles she passed under the Clifton Suspension Bridge, another Brunel design. She waited for two weeks in the Cumberland Basin for a tide high enough to get her back through the locks to the Floating Harbour and her birthplace, the dry dock in the Great Western Dockyard (now a Grade II* listed building, disused since bomb damage in the Second World War).

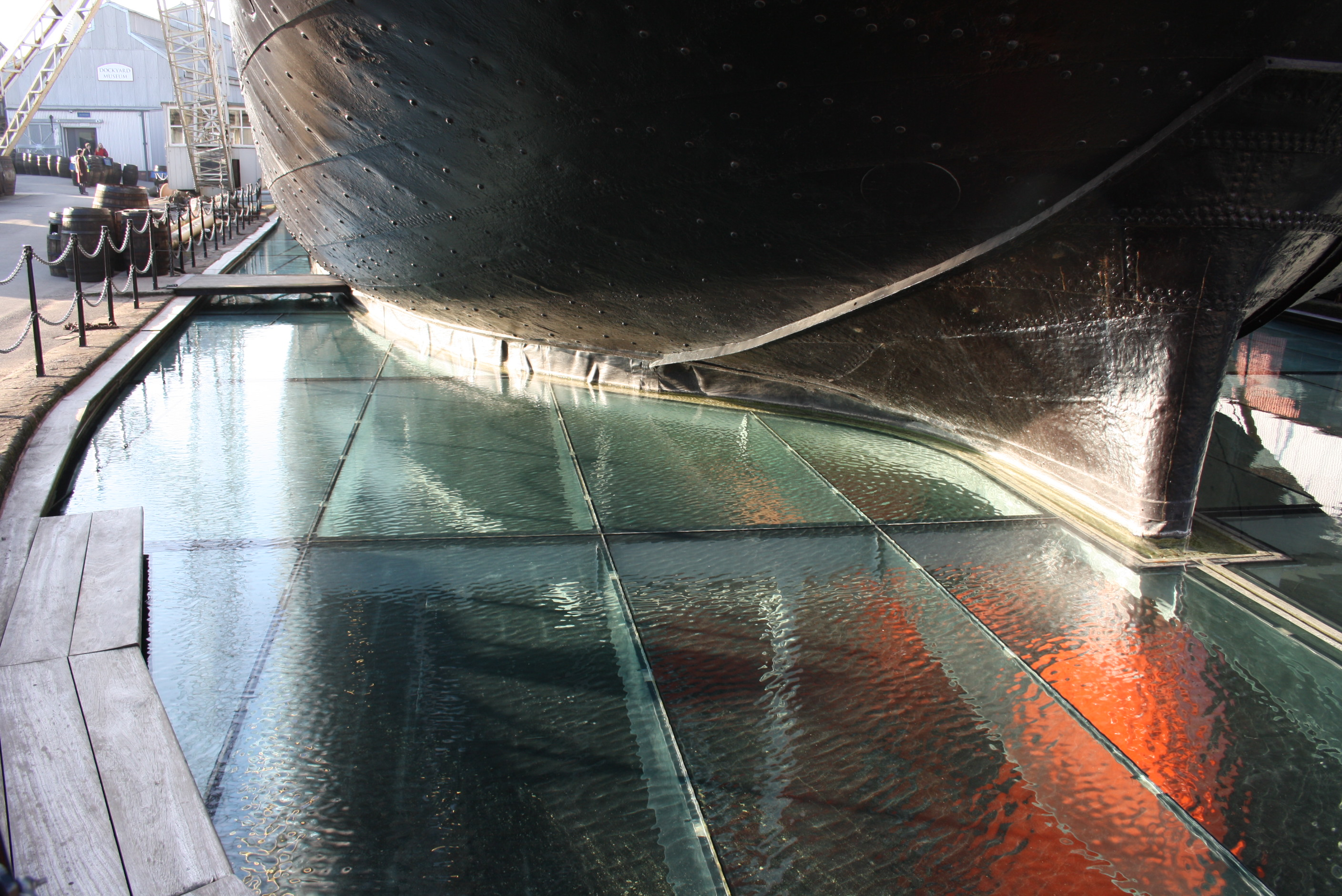
The air seal around Great Britain's hull.

The recovery and subsequent voyage from the Falklands to Bristol were depicted in the 1970 BBC Chronicle programme, The Great Iron Ship.

The original intent was to restore her to her 1843 state. However, the philosophy changed and the conservation of all surviving pre-1970 material became the aim. In 1984 the SS Great Britain was designated as a Historic Mechanical Engineering Landmark by the American Society of Mechanical Engineers, the fourth such designation outside the US.

By 1998, an extensive survey discovered that the hull was continuing to corrode in the humid atmosphere of the dock and estimates gave her 25 years before she corroded away. Extensive conservation work began which culminated in the installation of a glass plate across the dry dock at the level of her water line, with two dehumidifiers, keeping the space beneath at 20% relative humidity, sufficiently dry to preserve the surviving material. This being completed, the ship was "re-launched" in July 2005, and visitor access to the dry dock was restored. The site is visited by over 150,000 visitors a year with a peak in numbers in 2006 when 200,000 people visited.

=== Awards ===
The engineers Fenton Holloway won the IStructE Award for Heritage Buildings in 2006 for the restoration of Great Britain. In May of that year, the ship won the prestigious Gulbenkian Prize for museums and galleries, now known as Museum of the Year. The chairman of the judging panel, Professor Robert Winston, commented:

SS Great Britain got our unanimous vote for being outstanding at every level. It combines a truly groundbreaking piece of conservation, remarkable engineering and fascinating social history plus a visually stunning ship above and below the water line. Most importantly, the SS Great Britain is accessible and highly engaging for people of all ages.

The project won The Crown Estate Conservation Award in 2007, and the European Museum of the Year Awards Micheletti Prize for 'Best Industrial or Technology Museum'. In 2008 the educational value of the project was honoured by the Sandford Award for Heritage Education.

=== Museum and Being Brunel ===
Being Brunel is a museum dedicated to Isambard Kingdom Brunel and built on the harbour next to his ship. Opened in 2018, it holds thousands of Brunel-related items, such as his school reports, his diaries and his technical drawing instruments. Costing £2 million, it occupies buildings on the quayside including Brunel's drawing office. It includes a reconstruction of his dining room from Duke Street, and the drawing office has been restored to its 1850 condition.

The main museum was reopened in July 2026 after a refurbishment and a new name - Bristol Dockyards. The focus moves more to the lives of ordinary passengers from 1845 to 1886 – when SS Great Britain was the biggest, fastest ship at sea, carrying passengers from 51 nations.

== Popular culture ==
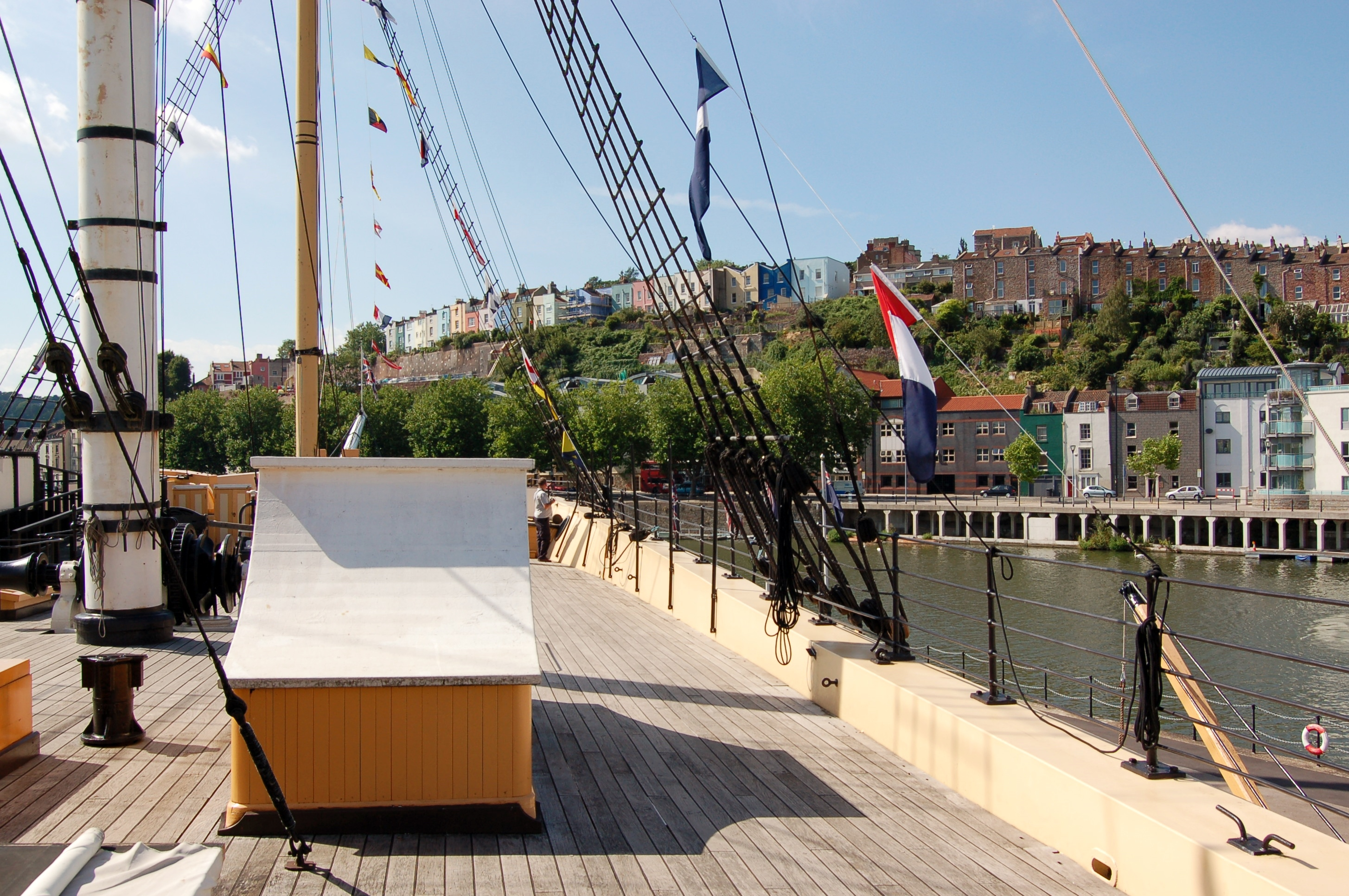
Aboard the preserved Great Britain, with Hotwells in the background

Great Britain featured in several television specials.

- The ITV1 series The West Country Tonight, in July 2010, told five aspects of the Great Britain's story: her history, her restoration and Bristolians' memories of her return to the city, showing their home footage of the event. Correspondent Robert Murphy travelled to Grand Bahama for an exclusive interview with Sir Jack Hayward, then moved to the Falkland Islands where he spoke with islanders who worked in the salvage team.
- A BBC West documentary called When Brunel's Ship Came Home tells the story of the salvage operation and was broadcast on BBC One in the West of England on 12 July 2010. It includes memories of many of the people who were involved.
- A 15-minute animated short film called The Incredible Journey produced with the University of the West of England tells the story of the ship's return to Bristol from the Falklands in 1970.
- In 2015 it was announced that the new British passport would include an image of the SS Great Britain on a page of Iconic Innovations.
- The Living TV series Most Haunted went on the ship in 2009.

== Dimensions ==
- Length: 322 ft (98 m)
- Beam (width): 50.5 ft (15.39 m)
- Height (main deck to keel): 32.5 ft (9.91 m)
- Weight unladen: 1,930 long tons (2,160 short tons; 1,960 tonnes)
- Displacement: 3,018 long tons (3,380 short tons; 3,066 tonnes)

Engine

- Rated horsepower: 1,000 horsepower (750 kW)
- Weight: 340 long tons (380 short tons; 350 tonnes)
- Cylinders: 4 x inverted 'V' 88 inches (223.5 cm) bore
- Stroke: 72 inches (182.9 cm)
- Pressure: 5 psi (34 kPa)
- RPM: Max. 20 rpm
- Main crankshaft: 17 feet (5.18 m) long and 28 inches (71.1 cm) diameter

Propeller

- Diameter: 15.5 ft (4.72 m)
- Weight: 77 long hundredweight (3,900 kg)
- Speed: 55 rpm

Other data

- Fuel capacity: 1,100 long tons (1,232 short tons; 1,118 tonnes) of coal
- Water capacity: 200 long tons (224 short tons; 203 tonnes)
- Cargo capacity: 1,200 long tons (1,344 short tons; 1,219 tonnes)
- Cost of construction: £117,295

== See also ==
- SS Great Eastern
- SS Great Western

== Bibliography ==
- American Chain Association (2005). Standard Handbook of Chains: Chains for Power Transmission and Material Handling (2nd ed.). CRC Press. ISBN 978-1-57444-647-0.
- Ball, Adrian; Wright, Diana (1981). S. S. "Great Britain". David & Charles. ISBN 978-0-7153-8096-3.
- Brown, Paul (2009). Britain's Historic Ships: A Complete Guide to the Ships that Shaped the Nation. Anova Books. ISBN 978-1-84486-093-7.
- Claxton, Christopher (1845). History and Description of the Steam-Ship Great Britain, Built at Bristol for the Great Western Steam-Ship Company. New York: J. S. Homans. OCLC 02773078.
- Dumpleton, Bernard; Miller, Muriel (2013). Brunel's Three Ships. University of Chicago Press. ISBN 978-1-84150-800-9.
- Farr, Grahame (1965). McGrath, Patrick; Harris, Peter (eds.). "The Steamship Great Britain". BHA pamphlets, no. 11. Bristol, England: Bristol Branch of the Historical Association, University of Bristol. pp. 1, 6f, and passim.
- Fletcher, R. A. (1910). Steam-ships: The story of their development to the present day. London: Sidgwick & Jackson. OCLC 7384477.
- Fox, Stephen (2003). Transatlantic: Samuel Cunard, Isambard Brunel, and the Great Atlantic Steamships. HarperCollins. ISBN 978-0-06-019595-3. OCLC 231981040.
- Gibbs, Charles Robert Vernon (1957). Passenger Liners of the Western Ocean: A Record of Atlantic Steam and Motor Passenger Vessels from 1838 to the Present Day. London: John De Graff. OCLC 3775315.
- Haddelsey, Stephen; Carroll, Alan (2014). Operation Tabarin: Britain's Secret Wartime Expedition to Antarctica 1944–46. History Press. ISBN 978-0-7509-5511-9. OCLC 875866833.
- Maginnis, Arthur J. (1900). The Atlantic ferry: its ships, men, and working. London: Whittaker & co. OCLC 77121824.
- Reid, Alexander (1862). The Cabinet, or a Repository of Facts, Figures and Fancies relating to the Voyage of the "Great Britain" SS. Melbourne: J. Reid.
