= 1770 =

1770 in various calendars
- Gregorian calendar: 1770; MDCCLXX
- Ab urbe condita: 2523
- Armenian calendar: 1219; ԹՎ ՌՄԺԹ
- Assyrian calendar: 6520
- Balinese saka calendar: 1691–1692
- Bengali calendar: 1176–1177
- Berber calendar: 2720
- British Regnal year: 10 Geo. 3 – 11 Geo. 3
- Buddhist calendar: 2314
- Burmese calendar: 1132
- Byzantine calendar: 7278–7279
- Chinese calendar: 己丑年 (Earth Ox); 4467 or 4260 — to — 庚寅年 (Metal Tiger); 4468 or 4261
- Coptic calendar: 1486–1487
- Discordian calendar: 2936
- Ethiopian calendar: 1762–1763
- Hebrew calendar: 5530–5531
- Hindu calendars
- Vikram Samvat: 1826–1827
- Shaka Samvat: 1691–1692
- Kali Yuga: 4870–4871
- Holocene calendar: 11770
- Igbo calendar: 770–771
- Iranian calendar: 1148–1149
- Islamic calendar: 1183–1184
- Japanese calendar: Meiwa 7 (明和７年)
- Javanese calendar: 1695–1696
- Julian calendar: Gregorian minus 11 days
- Korean calendar: 4103
- Minguo calendar: 142 before ROC 民前142年
- Nanakshahi calendar: 302
- Thai solar calendar: 2312–2313
- Tibetan calendar: ས་མོ་གླང་ལོ་ (female Earth-Ox); 1896 or 1515 or 743 — to — ལྕགས་ཕོ་སྟག་ལོ་ (male Iron-Tiger); 1897 or 1516 or 744

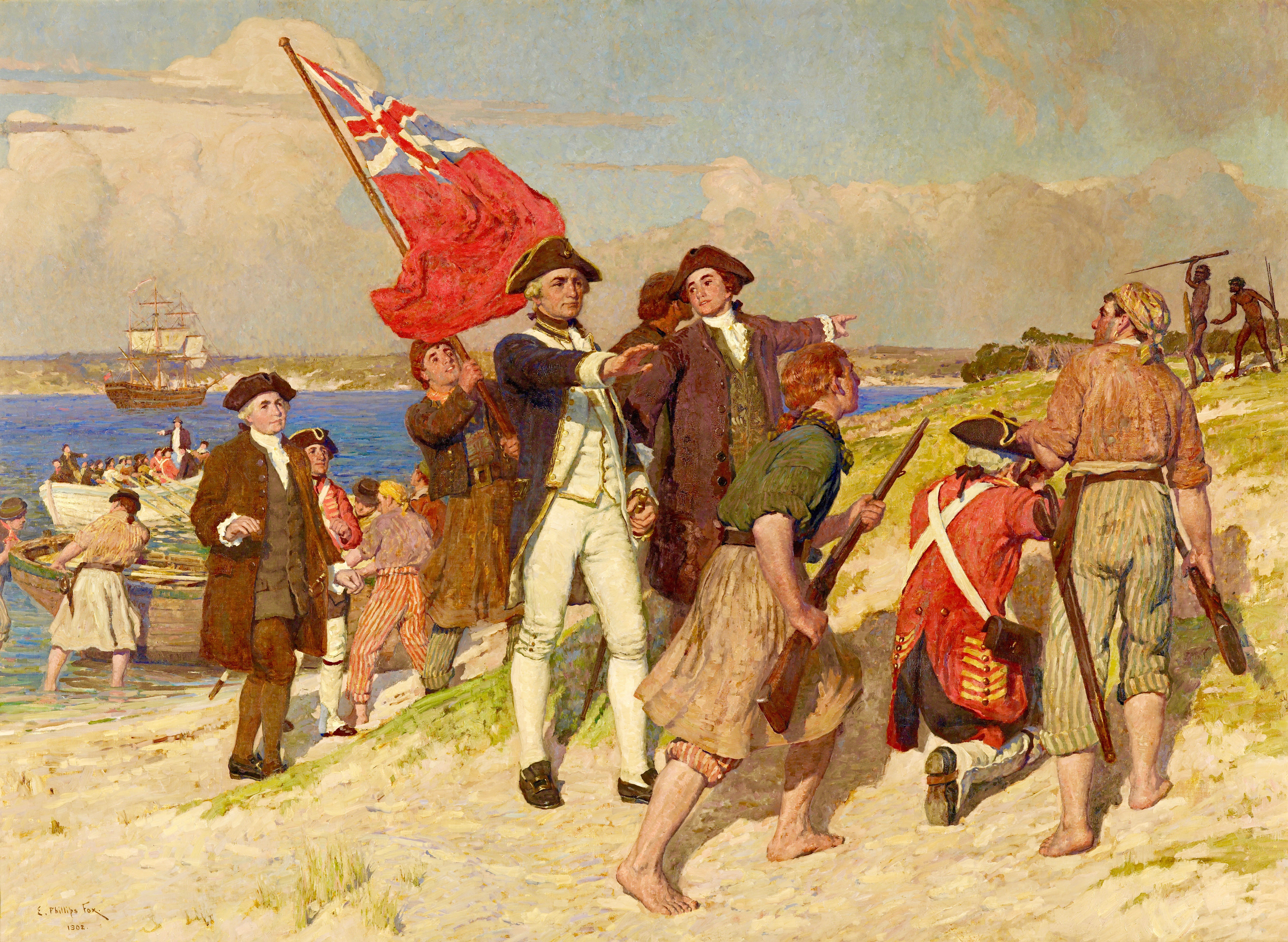
April 29: James Cook lands at Botany Bay in Australia.

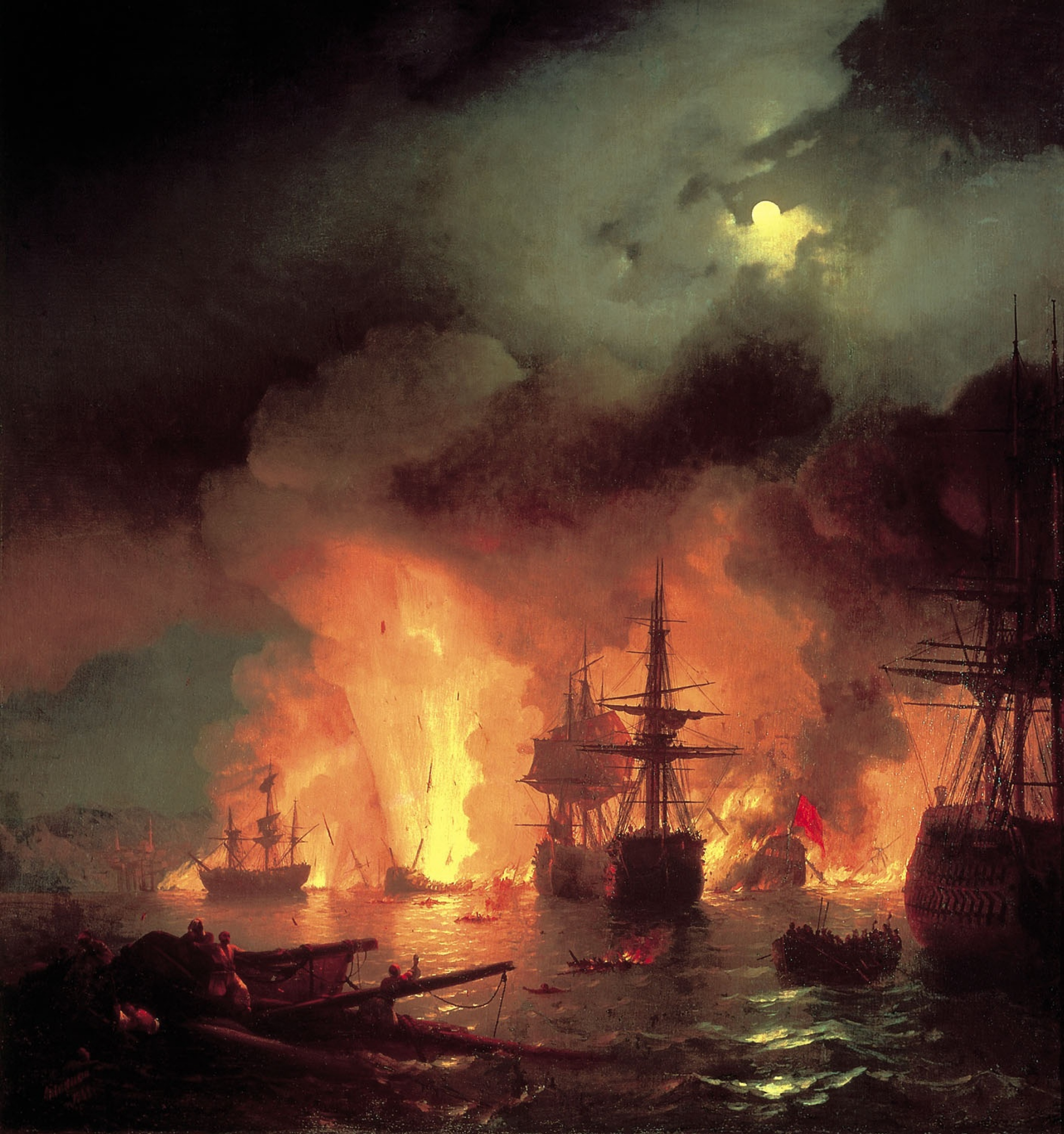
July 5: Russia defeats Ottomans at the Battle of Chesma (painting by Ivan Aivazovsky)

1770 (MDCCLXX) was a common year starting on Monday of the Gregorian calendar and a common year starting on Friday of the Julian calendar, the 1770th year of the Common Era (CE) and Anno Domini (AD) designations, the 770th year of the 2nd millennium, the 70th year of the 18th century, and the 1st year of the 1770s decade. As of the start of 1770, the Gregorian calendar was 11 days ahead of the Julian calendar, which remained in localized use until 1923.

== Events ==
=== January– March ===
- January 1 – The foundation of Fort George, Bombay is laid by Colonel Keating, principal engineer, on the site of the former Dongri Fort.
- February 1 – Thomas Jefferson's home at Shadwell, Virginia is destroyed by fire, along with most of his books.
- February 14 – Scottish explorer James Bruce arrives at Gondar, capital of Abyssinia (modern-day Ethiopia) and is received by the Emperor Tekle Haymanot II and Ras Mikael Sehul.
- February 22 – Christopher Seider, an 11-year-old boy in Boston in the British Province of Massachusetts Bay, is shot and killed by a colonial official, Ebenezer Richardson. The funeral sets off anti-British protests that lead to the massacre days later.
- March 5 – Boston Massacre: Eleven American men are shot (five fatally) by British troops, in an event that helps start the American Revolutionary War five years later.
- March 21 – King Prithvi Narayan Shah shifts to the newly constructed Basantapur Palace, in the capital Kathmandu, as the first King of the Unified Kingdom of Nepal.
- March 26 – First voyage of James Cook: English explorer Captain James Cook and his crew aboard HMS Endeavour complete the circumnavigation of New Zealand.

=== April–June ===
- April 12 – The Townshend Acts are repealed by Britain's Parliament by the efforts of Prime Minister Frederick North, with the exception of the increased duties on imported tea. The American colonists, in turn, stop their embargo on British imports.
- April 18 (April 19 by Cook's log) 18:00 – First voyage of James Cook: English explorer Captain James Cook and his crew become the first recorded Europeans to encounter the eastern coastline of the Australian continent. Land is sighted at Point Hicks, and named after Lieutenant Hicks who first observes landform at 6am.
- April 20 – Battle of Aspindza: Georgian king Erekle II defeats the Ottoman forces, despite being abandoned by an ally, Russian General Totleben.
- April 29 – First voyage of James Cook: Captain Cook drops anchor on HMS Endeavour in a wide bay, about 16 km (10 mi) south of the present city of Sydney, Australia. Because the young botanist on board the ship, Joseph Banks, discovers 30,000 specimens of plant life in the area, 1,600 of them unknown to European science, Cook names the place Botany Bay on May 7.
- May 16 – 14-year-old Marie Antoinette of Austria marries Louis-Auguste (who in 1774 becomes King Louis XVI) at the Palace of Versailles.
- May 20 – A stampede at a celebration of the newly wedded Marie Antoinette and Louis-Auguste in Paris kills more than a hundred people.
- June 3
  - Gaspar de Portolà and Father Junípero Serra establish Monterey, the presidio of Alta California territory for Spain from 1777–1822, United Mexican States 1824–1846, until the California Republic.
  - The 7.5 M_{w} Port-au-Prince earthquake affects the French colony of Saint-Domingue with a maximum Mercalli intensity of X (Extreme), killing 250 or more.
- June 9 – Falklands Crisis (1770): Some 1,600 Spanish marines, sent by the Spanish governor of Buenos Aires in five frigates, seize Port Egmont in the Falkland Islands. The small British force present promptly surrenders.
- June 11 – First voyage of James Cook: HMS Endeavour grounds on the Great Barrier Reef.

=== July– September ===
- July 1 – Lexell's Comet (D/1770 L1) passes the Earth at a distance of 2,184,129 kilometres (1,357,155 mi), the closest approach by a comet in recorded history.
- July 5 – Battle of Chesma and Battle of Larga: The Russian Empire defeats the Ottoman Empire in both battles. When the news of the defeat reaches the Ottoman city of Smyrna (July 8), the crowd attacks the Greek community of the city (perceived as favourable to the Russian cause) and kills an estimated 200 Greeks and three Western Europeans (although some reports estimate the number of victims at 3,000 or even 5,000 including "3 or 4 thousands who die due to the fright").
- August 1 (July 21 O.S.) – Russo-Turkish War (1768–74) – Battle of Kagul: Russian commander Pyotr Rumyantsev routs 150,000 Turks.
- August 22 (August 23 by Cook's log) – First voyage of James Cook: Captain Cook determines that New Holland (Australia) is not contiguous with New Guinea, and claims the whole of its eastern coast for Great Britain, later naming it all New South Wales.
- c. September – Johann Gottfried Herder meets Johann Wolfgang von Goethe in Strasbourg.
- September 24 – In Hillsborough, North Carolina, the Regulator Movement riots against local authorities.

=== October–December ===
- October 11 – Phillis Wheatley becomes the first African American woman to have her work published, after having written a poetic elegy to the late Reverend George Whitefield.
- November 14 – James Bruce discovers what he believes to be the source of the Nile.
- December 7 – King Louis XV of France issues the "Edict of December", dismissing the rebellious magistrates of the Parlements of Paris and the other 13 provinces.
- December 24 – France's Secretary of the Navy, César Gabriel de Choiseul, is dismissed from his position by the king.

=== Date unknown ===
- Joseph Priestley, English chemist, recommends the use of a rubber eraser to remove pencil marks.
- Joseph-Louis Lagrange proves Bachet's conjecture.
- The Baron d'Holbach's (anonymous) materialist work Le Système de la Nature ou Des Loix du Monde Physique et du Monde Moral is produced in Neuchâtel.
- The last Cuman to speak the Cuman language (István Varró) dies in Hungary.

== Births ==
- February 21 – Georges Mouton, Marshal of France (d. 1838)
- March 2 – Louis-Gabriel Suchet, Marshal of France (d. 1826)
- March 20 – Friedrich Hölderlin, German writer (d. 1843)
- April 3 – Theodoros Kolokotronis, Greek general (d. 1843)
- April 7 – William Wordsworth, English poet (d. 1850)
- April 8 – John Campbell, Australian public servant, politician (d. 1830)
- April 11 – George Canning, Prime Minister of the United Kingdom (d. 1827)
- April 25 – Georg Sverdrup, Norwegian philologist (d. 1850)
- April 30 – David Thompson, English-Canadian explorer (d. 1857)
- May 10 – Louis-Nicolas Davout, Marshal of France (d. 1823)
- May 15 – Ezekiel Hart, Canadian entrepreneur, politician (d. 1843)
- May 27 – Ignaz Döllinger, German anatomist, physiologist (d. 1841)
- May 29 – Charles Adams, second son of President John Adams (1735–1826) (d. 1800)
- June 1 – Friedrich Laun, German author (d. 1849)

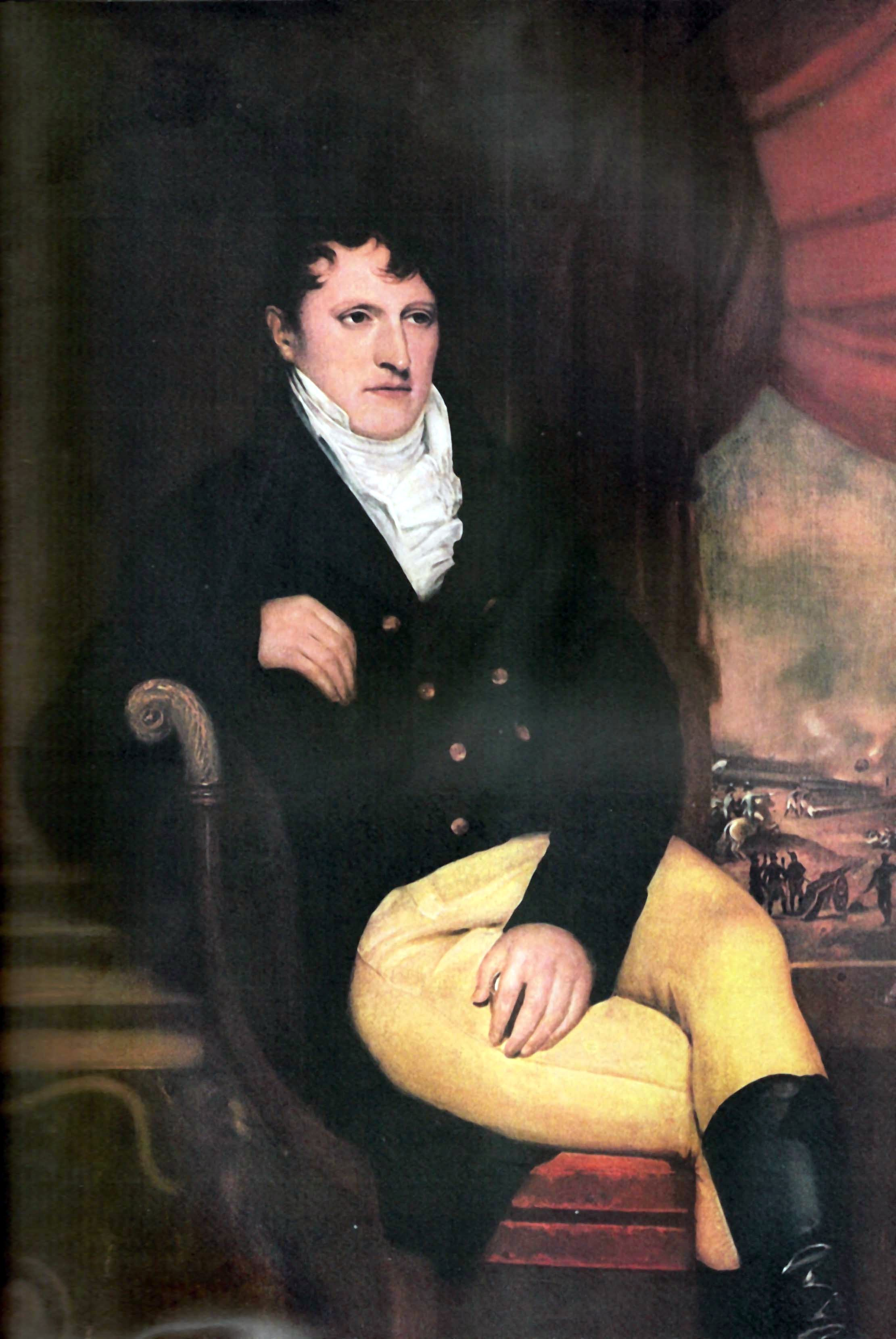
Manuel Belgrano

- June 3 – Manuel Belgrano, Argentine politician, general in the Independence War (d. 1820)
- June 4 – Eleonora Charlotta d'Albedyhll, Swedish countess, poet and salon holder (d. 1835)
- June 7 – Robert Jenkinson, 2nd Earl of Liverpool, Prime Minister of the United Kingdom (d. 1828)
- June 20 – Moses Waddel, American educator/minister and bestselling author (d. 1840)
- August 1 – William Clark, American explorer, Governor of Missouri Territory, and Superintendent of Indian Affairs (d. 1838)
- August 3 – King Frederick William III of Prussia (d. 1840)
- August 18 – Dorothea von Rodde-Schlözer, German scholar (d. 1825)

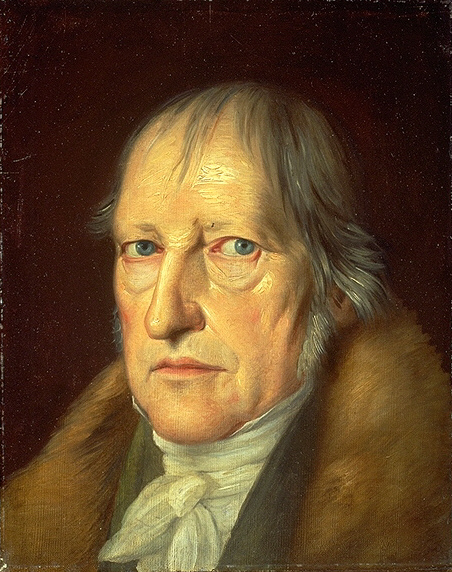
Georg Wilhelm Friedrich Hegel

- August 27 – Georg Wilhelm Friedrich Hegel, German philosopher (d. 1831)
- October 10 – Adam Johann von Krusenstern, Baltic German explorer who led the First Russian circumnavigation (d. 1846)
- October 18 – Thomas Phillips, English painter (d. 1845)
- November 5 – Sarah Guppy, English inventor (d. 1852)
- November 19 – Bertel Thorvaldsen, Danish-Icelandic sculptor (d. 1844)

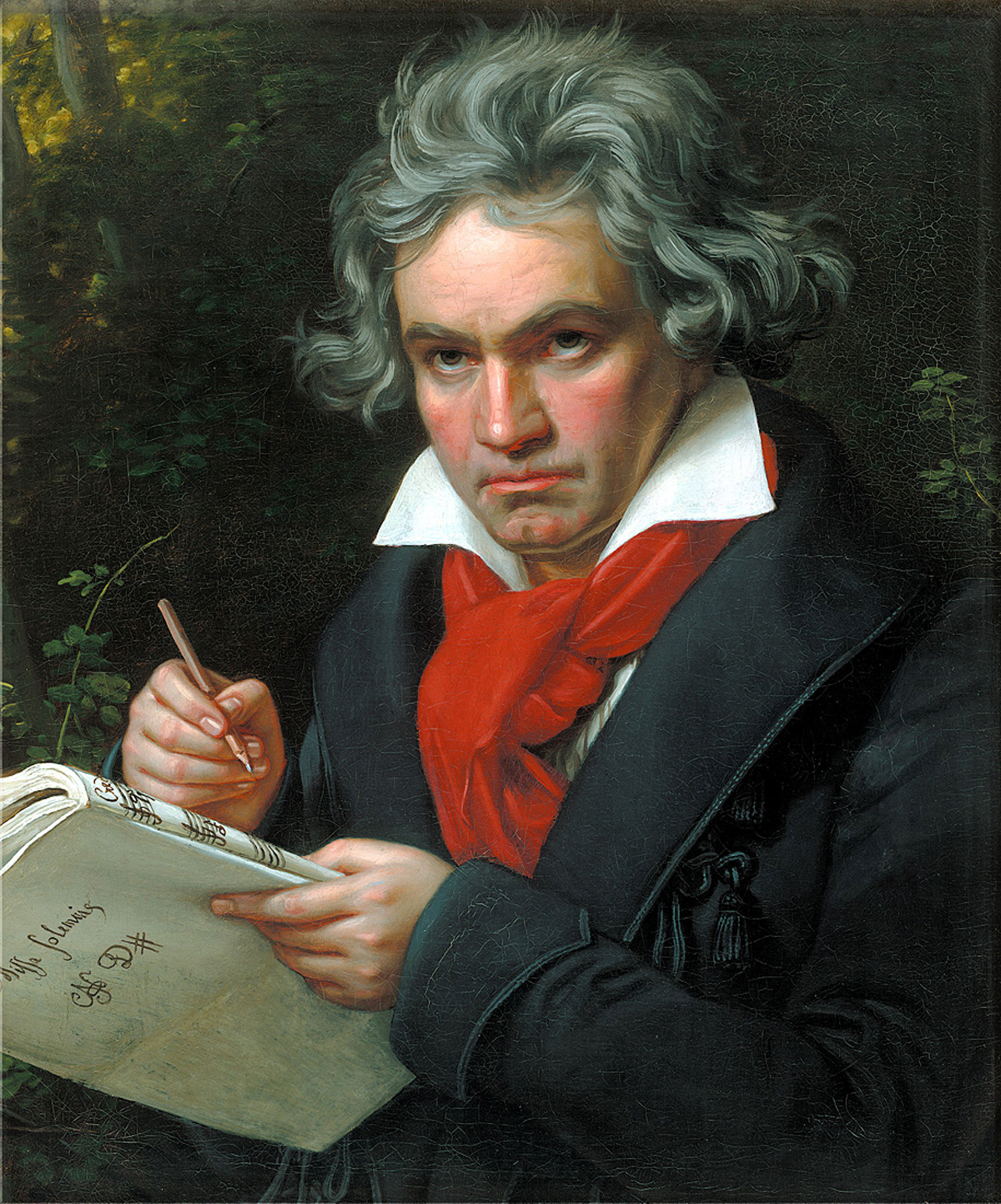
Ludwig van Beethoven

- December 17 (bapt.) – Ludwig van Beethoven, German classical composer (d. 1827)

== Deaths ==
- January 7 – Carl Gustaf Tessin, Swedish politician (b. 1695)
- January 8 – John Michael Rysbrack, Flemish sculptor (b. 1694)
- January 20 – Charles Yorke, Lord Chancellor of Great Britain (b. 1722)
- January 27 – Johann Karl Philipp von Cobenzl, 18th-century politician (b. 1712)
- January 30 – Giovanni Pietro Francesco Agius de Soldanis, Maltese linguist, historian and cleric (b. 1712)
- January 27 – Philippe Macquer, French historian (b. 1720)
- February 26 – Giuseppe Tartini, Italian composer, violinist (b. 1692)
- March 5 – Crispus Attucks, African-American dockworker, first to die in the Boston Massacre (b. 1723)
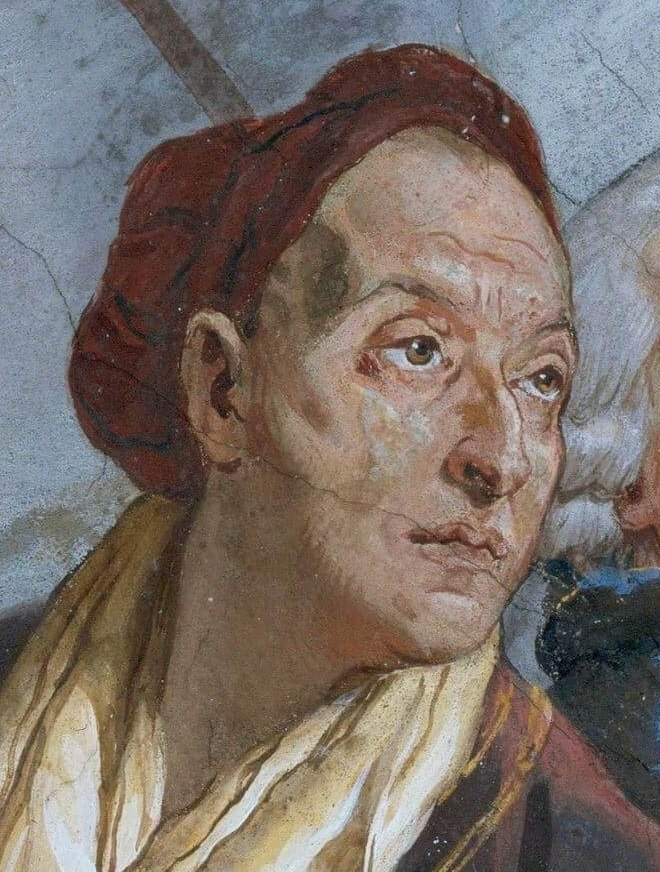
- Giovanni Battista Tiepolo
  March 27 – Giovanni Battista Tiepolo, Venetian artist (b. 1696)
- April 27 – José Solís Folch de Cardona, Spanish colonial governor (b. 1716)
- April 25 – Jean-Antoine Nollet, French abbot, physicist (b. 1700)
- May 30 – François Boucher, French painter (b. 1703)
- June 22 – Philip Carteret Webb, English barrister (b. 1702)
- June 23 – Mark Akenside, English poet, physician (b. 1721)
- July 17 – Joseph Paris Duverney, French banker (b. 1684)
- July 21 – Charlotta Frölich, Swedish agronomist (b. 1698)
- July 27 – Robert Dinwiddie, British colonial Governor of Virginia (b. 1693)
- August 15 – Edward Antill (colonial politician), American winemaker (b. 1701)
- August 24 – Thomas Chatterton, English poet (b. 1752)
- September 2 – Hongzhou, Manchu prince of the Qing Dynasty (b. 1712)
- September 9 – Bernhard Siegfried Albinus, German anatomist (b. 1697)
- September 22 – Ignatius of Santhià, Italian Catholic priest (b. 1686)

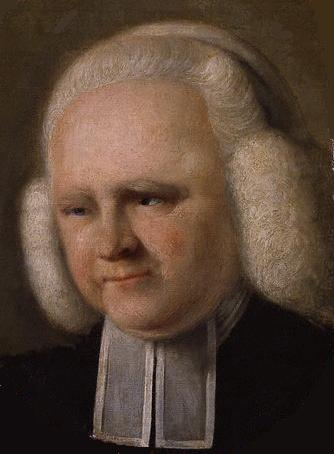
George Whitefield

- September 30
  - George Whitefield, English-born Methodist leader (b. 1714)
  - Thomas Robinson, 1st Baron Grantham, English politician and diplomat (b. c. 1695)
- October 14 – Benning Wentworth, colonial governor of New Hampshire (b. 1696)
- October 18 – John Manners, Marquess of Granby, British soldier (b. 1721)
- October 24 – William Bartram, American scientist and politician (b. 1711)
- November 9 – John Campbell, 4th Duke of Argyll, Scottish politician (b. c. 1693)
- November 13 – George Grenville, Prime Minister of Great Britain (b. 1712)
- November 24 – Charles-Jean-François Hénault, French historian (b. 1685)
- December 4 – John Perceval, 2nd Earl of Egmont, Irish politician (b. 1711)
- December 5 – James Stirling, Scottish mathematician (b. 1692)
- December 6 – Neri Maria Corsini, Italian Catholic priest and cardinal (b. 1685)
