= 1720 =

1720 in various calendars
- Gregorian calendar: 1720; MDCCXX
- Ab urbe condita: 2473
- Armenian calendar: 1169; ԹՎ ՌՃԿԹ
- Assyrian calendar: 6470
- Balinese saka calendar: 1641–1642
- Bengali calendar: 1126–1127
- Berber calendar: 2670
- British Regnal year: 6 Geo. 1 – 7 Geo. 1
- Buddhist calendar: 2264
- Burmese calendar: 1082
- Byzantine calendar: 7228–7229
- Chinese calendar: 己亥年 (Earth Pig); 4417 or 4210 — to — 庚子年 (Metal Rat); 4418 or 4211
- Coptic calendar: 1436–1437
- Discordian calendar: 2886
- Ethiopian calendar: 1712–1713
- Hebrew calendar: 5480–5481
- Hindu calendars
- Vikram Samvat: 1776–1777
- Shaka Samvat: 1641–1642
- Kali Yuga: 4820–4821
- Holocene calendar: 11720
- Igbo calendar: 720–721
- Iranian calendar: 1098–1099
- Islamic calendar: 1132–1133
- Japanese calendar: Kyōhō 5 (享保５年)
- Javanese calendar: 1644–1645
- Julian calendar: Gregorian minus 11 days
- Korean calendar: 4053
- Minguo calendar: 192 before ROC 民前192年
- Nanakshahi calendar: 252
- Thai solar calendar: 2262–2263
- Tibetan calendar: ས་མོ་ཕག་ལོ་ (female Earth-Boar); 1846 or 1465 or 693 — to — ལྕགས་ཕོ་བྱི་བ་ལོ་ (male Iron-Rat); 1847 or 1466 or 694

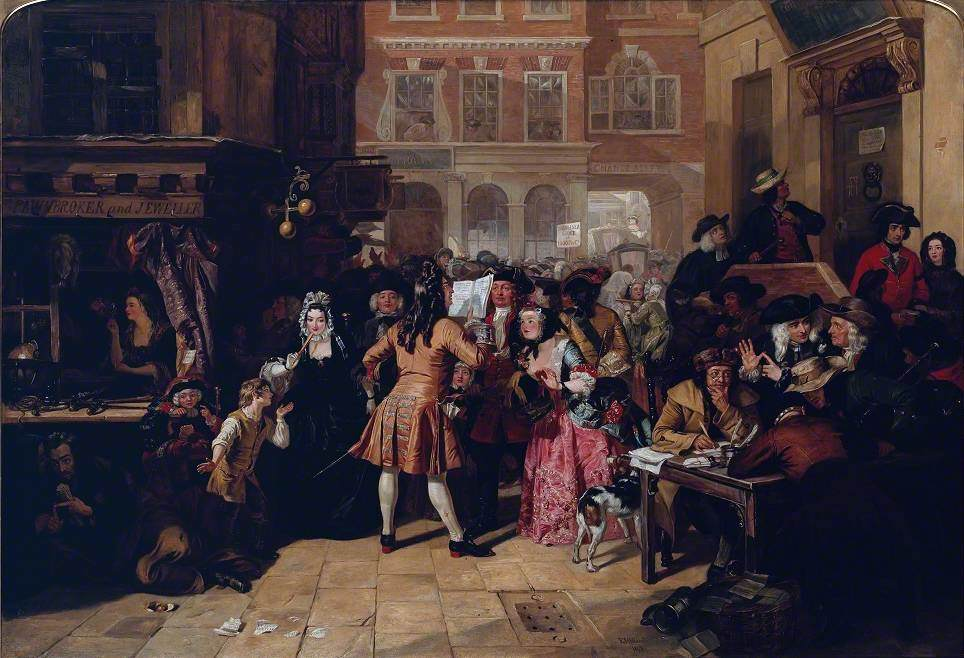
September 30: The British stock market crashes with the collapse of the South Sea Company.

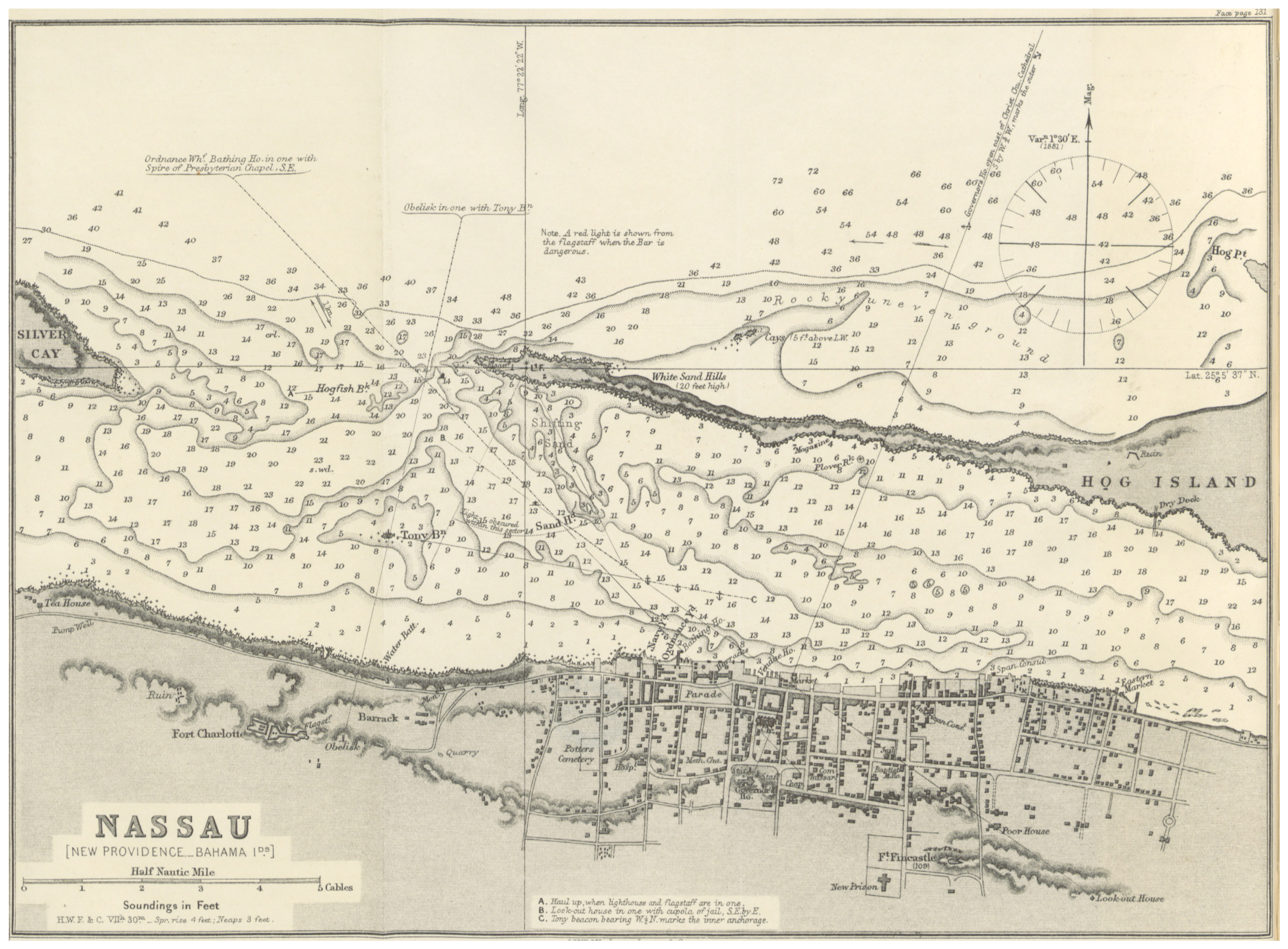
February 24: Battle of Nassau

1720 (MDCCXX) was a leap year starting on Monday of the Gregorian calendar and a leap year starting on Friday of the Julian calendar, the 1720th year of the Common Era (CE) and Anno Domini (AD) designations, the 720th year of the 2nd millennium, the 20th year of the 18th century, and the 1st year of the 1720s decade. As of the start of 1720, the Gregorian calendar was 11 days ahead of the Julian calendar, which remained in localized use until 1923.

== Events ==
=== January–March ===
- January 21 – Treaties of Stockholm (Great Northern War): Sweden and Prussia sign a treaty by which part of Swedish Pomerania, including the town of Stettin, is ceded to Prussia.
- February 10 – Edmond Halley is appointed as Astronomer Royal for England.
- February 17 – The Treaty of The Hague is signed between Spain, Britain, France, Austria and the Dutch Republic, ending the War of the Quadruple Alliance with effect from May 20.
- February 24 – Battle of Nassau: Spanish forces assault the British settlement of Nassau, Bahamas at the end of the War of the Quadruple Alliance.
- March 11 (February 29 Old Style) – Queen Ulrika Eleonora of Sweden resigns, to let her husband Frederick I take over as king of Sweden. She had desired a joint rule, in a similar manner to William III and Mary II in Britain, but as the Riksdag of the Estates (Sweden's parliament) refuses this, she abdicates in her husband's favour instead.

=== April–June ===
- April 4 – The Riksdag of the Estates elects Frederick I new King of Sweden.
- April 17 – Bajirao I is appointed as the Peshwa of the Maratha Empire by Chhatrapati Shahu, succeeding his father Peshwa.
- May 2 – The Riksdag of the Estates in Sweden adopts the Instrument of Government (1720), an amendment of the 1719 constitution continuing the "Age of Liberty" in the country.
- May 3 – The coronation of King Frederick I of Sweden takes place in Stockholm, six weeks after his rule began.
- May – Great Plague of Marseille begins. The last major outbreak of bubonic plague in western Europe, the disease kill over 100,000 people in the city and surrounding area of France.
- May 20 – The Treaty of The Hague, signed between Spain and the Quadruple Alliance (Britain, France, the Netherlands and Austria) on February 17, goes into effect. Spain renounces its claims to the Italian possessions of the French throne, and Austria and the Duchy of Savoy trade Sicily for Sardinia.
- May 25 – The British privateer Speedwell, captained by George Shelvocke, is wrecked off of the coast of Chile on the uninhabited "Robinson Crusoe Island" (Más a Tierra, where Alexander Selkirk was marooned for 5 years). The crew is marooned for 5 months but can build a boat from timbers salvaged from the wreck, and is able to escape the island on October 6.
- June 1 – British silversmiths are once again allowed to use sterling silver after 24 years of being limited to a higher quality (but softer) Britannia silver.
- June 11 – The British Parliament approves the Bubble Act (officially the Royal Exchange and London Assurance Corporation Act 1719), prohibiting the formation of joint-stock companies without prior approval by royal charter.
- June 19 – At Burhanpur (in the modern-day Indian state of Madhya Pradesh), the Nizam-ul-Mulk of Hyderabad survives an attempted ambush by Mughal Empire forces dispatched by the Sayyid brothers (Syed Abdullah Khan and Syed Husain Ali Khan Barha) and goes on to establish a rival state in southern India.
- June 25 – The "South Sea Bubble", the phenomenal growth of the South Sea Company, reaches its peak as South Sea stock is priced at £1,060 a share. By the end of September, as panic sales are made, the price falls to £150.

=== July–September ===
- July 12 – Under the authority of the Bubble Act, the Lords Justices in Great Britain attempt to curb some of the excesses of the stock markets during the "South Sea Bubble". They dissolve a number of petitions for patents and charters, and abolish more than 80 joint-stock companies of dubious merit, but this has little effect on the creation of "Bubbles", ephemeral joint-stock companies created during the hysteria of the times.
- July 14 (July 3 O.S.) – The Treaty of Frederiksborg is signed between Denmark–Norway and Sweden, restoring the occupied portion of Swedish Pomerania to Sweden and ending the Great Northern War.
- July 27 – The Battle of Grengam takes place in the Ledsund strait between the island communities of Föglö and Lemland. It is the last major naval battle in the Great Northern War taking place in the Åland Islands, marking the end of Russian and Swedish offensive naval operations in Baltic waters.
- August 14 – The Spanish Villasur expedition, which set out on June 16 from New Mexico, with the intention of checking French influence on the Great Plains of North America, ends in failure, as it is ambushed by a Pawnee and Otoe force.
- September 30 – "South Sea Bubble": The English stock market crashes, with dropping prices for stock in the South Sea Company.

=== October–December ===
- October 8 – Sayyid Hussain Ali Khan Barha, one of the powerful Sayyid brothers of the Mughal Empire in India, is stabbed to death by Turkish nobleman Haider Beg Dughlat after Dughlat distracts him by giving him a petition to read. The assassination is ordered by Nizam ul-Mulk in retaliation for Sayyid Hussain's attempted ambush on June 19.
- October 15 – Muhammad Ibrahim, a grandson of the late Emperor Bahadur Shah I, is freed from prison by conspirators and declared the Mughal Emperor as a rival of his brother Muhammad Shah, beginning a 32-day reign that is described as being "like a drop of dew upon a blade of grass".
- November 13 – India's Mughal Emperor Muhammad Shah defeats his brother, pretender Muhammad Ibrahim, in a battle at Hasanpur (in Uttar Pradesh). Ibrahim is returned to incarceration at the citadel of Shahjahanabad, part of modern-day Delhi.
- November 16 – Pirate John Rackham (captured on October 22) is brought to trial at Spanish Town in Jamaica; he is hanged at Port Royal two days later. Most of his crew is also hanged but female pirates Mary Read and Anne Bonny are spared.
- December 8 – Fath-Ali Khan Daghestani is deposed from his position as Grand Vizier of Iran (at this time, part of the Safavid Empire) and tortured by Mohammadqoli Khan, the bodyguard of the Safavid Shah, Sultan Husayn.

=== Date unknown ===
- The Tuscarora people leave North Carolina as a result of European colonization.
- The Town on Queen Anne's Creek, North Carolina is renamed Edenton, in honor of North Carolina Governor Charles Eden; it is incorporated in 1722.
- The Guild Regulation of 1720 is introduced in Sweden.
- The Kangxi Emperor announces that all western businessmen in China can trade only in Guangzhou.
- The Academia Real da Historia is founded in Lisbon, Portugal.
- Jonathan Swift begins major composition work on Gulliver's Travels in Ireland.
- Il teatro alla moda, a satirical pamphlet by Benedetto Marcello, is published anonymously in Venice.
- The first yacht club in the world, the Royal Cork Yacht Club, is founded in Ireland.
- Parallel to the English South Sea Bubble France experiences the Mississippi Bubble. Market shares of the Mississippi Company reach a peak price of over 10,000 livres in spring just to plummet to 1,000 by the end of the year. Monthly inflation in France reaches 23 percent and a bank rush ensues when investors try in vain to convert paper notes issued by the Banque Royale into gold and silver. John Law, the Scottish architect of the Bubble, is forced to flee the country.

== Births ==
- January 2 – José de Gálvez, Spanish politician (d. 1787)
- January 4 – Johann Friedrich Agricola, German composer (d. 1774)
- January 13 – Richard Hurd, English bishop and writer (d. 1808)
- January 27 – Samuel Foote, English dramatist and actor (d. 1777)
- January 30 – Charles De Geer, Swedish industrialist, entomologist (d. 1778)
- February 8 – Emperor Sakuramachi of Japan (d. 1750)
- February 15 – Philippe Macquer, French historian (d. 1770)
- March 9 – Philip Yorke, 2nd Earl of Hardwicke, English politician (d. 1790)
- March 13 – Charles Bonnet, Swiss naturalist and writer (d. 1793)
- March 15 – Philip, Duke of Parma, Spanish prince (d. 1765)
- March 22 – Nicolas-Henri Jardin, French architect (d. 1799)
- April 23 – Vilna Gaon, Lithuanian rabbi (d. 1797)
- May 8 – William Cavendish, 4th Duke of Devonshire, Prime Minister of the United Kingdom (d. 1764)
- May 15 – Maximilian Hell, Slovak astronomer (d. 1792)
- July 18 – Gilbert White, English naturalist and cleric (d. 1793)
- August 8 – Carl Fredrik Pechlin, Swedish politician (d. 1796)
- August 12 – Konrad Ekhof, German actor (d. 1778)
- August 18 – Laurence Shirley, 4th Earl Ferrers, English murderer (d. 1760)
- August 30 – Samuel Whitbread, English brewer, politician (d. 1796)
- October 3 – Johann Peter Uz, German poet (d. 1796)
- October 4 – Giovanni Battista Piranesi, Italian artist (d. 1778)
- October 8 – Jonathan Mayhew, American minister, patriot (d. 1766)
- October 8 – Geneviève Thiroux d'Arconville, French novelist, translator and chemist (d. 1805)
- October 19 – John Woolman, American Quaker preacher, abolitionist (d. 1772)
- November 1 – Toussaint-Guillaume Picquet de la Motte, French admiral (d. 1791)
- November 8 – Madeleine de Puisieux, French writer and active feminist (d. 1798)
- November 16 – Carlo Antonio Campioni, French-born composer (d. 1788)
- December 14 – Justus Möser, German statesman (d. 1794)
- December 24 – Anna Maria Mozart (née Pertl; d. 1778), wife of Leopold Mozart and mother of Wolfgang Amadeus Mozart and Maria Anna Mozart
- December 26 – Gian Francesco Albani, Italian Catholic cardinal (d. 1803)
- December 31 – Charles Edward Stuart, pretender to the British throne (d. 1788)

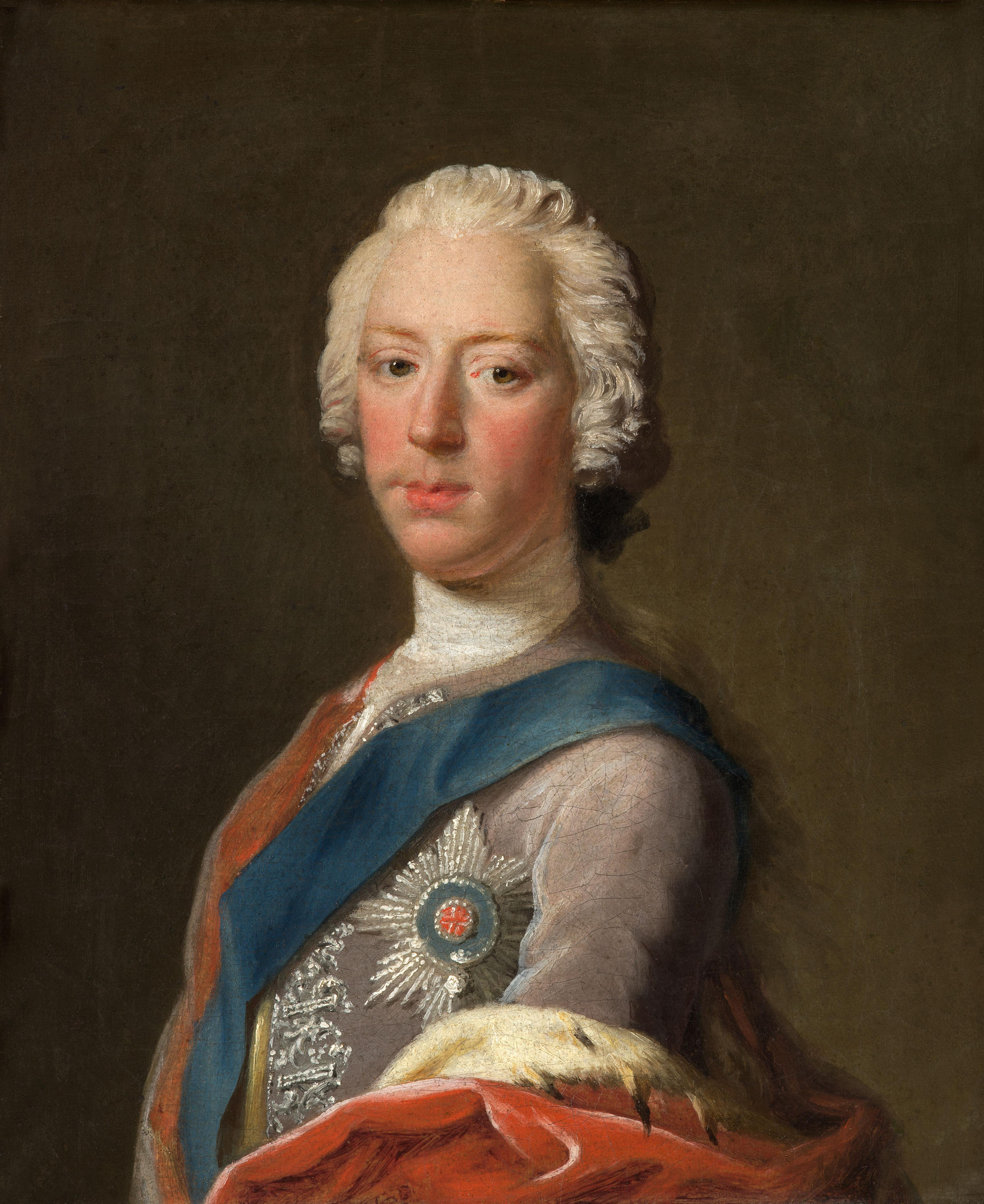
Charles Edward Stuart

- "date unknown" – Jane Gomeldon, English writer, poet and adventurer (d. 1779)
- "date unknown" – Sheikh Lamech, Persian banker and accountant (d. 1813)
- "date unknown" – Madame de Beaumer, French editor and writer (d. 1766)

== Deaths ==
- January – Francis Daniel Pastorius, founder of Germantown, Pennsylvania (b. 1651)
- January 4 – Harry Mordaunt, British politician (b. 1663)
- January 10 – Ramon Perellos, Spanish 64th Grandmaster of the Knights Hospitaller (b. 1637)
- January 12 – William Ashhurst, Lord Mayor of London (1693–1694) (b. 1647)
- January 19 – Eleonor Magdalene of Neuburg, Holy Roman Empress (b. 1655)
- January 20
  - Giovanni Maria Lancisi, Italian physician (b. 1654)
  - Angelo Paoli, Italian beatified (b. 1642)
- January 31 – Thomas Grey, 2nd Earl of Stamford, English privy councilor (b. c. 1645)
- February 4 – Robert Wroth, British politician (b. 1660)
- February 27 – Samuel Parris, English-born Puritan minister (b. 1653)
- March 6 – Pieter van Bloemen, Flemish painter (b. 1657)
- March 13 – William Sewel, Dutch historian (b. 1653)

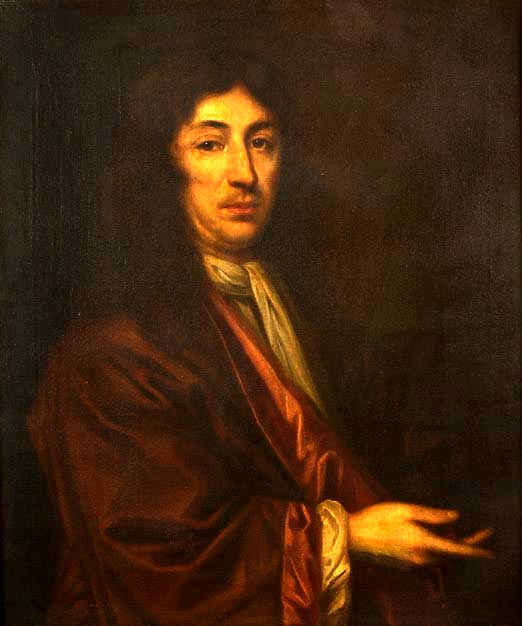
Joseph Dudley

- April 2 – Joseph Dudley, colonial Governor of Massachusetts (b. 1647)
- April 12 – Balaji Vishwanath, Peshwa of the Maratha Empire (b. 1662)
- April 20 – George Gordon, 1st Earl of Aberdeen, Lord Chancellor of Scotland (b. 1637)
- April 21 – Antoine Hamilton, French writer (b. 1646)
- June 19 – Robert Knox, English sea captain (b. 1641)
- June 27 – Guillaume Amfrye de Chaulieu, French poet (b. 1639)
- July 6 – Isaac Milles, English minister (b. 1638)
- July 7 – Juan Romero de Figueroa, Spanish priest (b. 1646)
- July 12 – King Sukjong of Joseon (b. 1661)
- August 3
  - Anthonie Heinsius, Dutch politician (b. 1641)
  - Anne Finch, Countess of Winchilsea, English poet (b. 1661)
- August 9 – Simon Ockley, English orientalist (b. 1678)
- August 17 – Anne Lefèvre, French scholar (b. 1654)
- August 21 – John Leake, English Royal Navy admiral (b. 1656)
- August 23 – Sybilla Masters, American inventor (b. c. 1676)
- August 26 – Johann Christoph Volkamer, German botanist (b. 1644)
- September 3 – Henri de Massue, Marquis de Ruvigny, 1st Viscount Galway, French soldier and diplomat (b. 1648)
- September 9 – Philippe de Courcillon, French officer and author (b. 1638)
- September 20 – Pierre de La Broue, American bishop (b. 1644)
- October 10 – Antoine Coysevox, French sculptor (b. 1640)
- November 12 – Peder Tordenskjold, Norwegian naval hero (b. 1690)

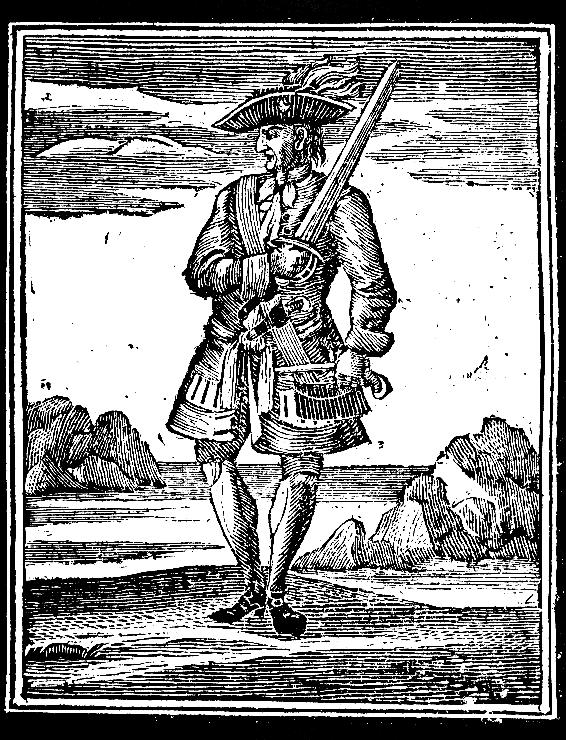
John Rackham

- November 18 – John Rackham, English pirate.
- November 27
  - Willem van Outhoorn, Dutch colonial governor (b. 1635)
  - Diego de Salinas, Governor of Gibraltar (b. 1649)
- December 29 – Maria Margarethe Kirch, German astronomer (b. 1670)
- date unknown
  - Shahzada Assadullah Khan Abdali, Persian Governor of Herat (b. 1687)
  - Demoiselle Conradi, German opera singer
