= Hénault =

Hénault is a surname. Notable people with the surname include:

- Charles-Jean-François Hénault (1685–1770), French writer and historian
- Ray Henault (born 1949), Canadian General
- Darren Henault (born 1965), American interior designer
