= Thomas Nugent (travel writer) =

British writer (c. 1700–1772)

Thomas Nugent (c. 1700 – 27 April 1772 in Gray's Inn, London) was an erudite Irish historian and travel writer. Today he is best known for his travelogue of the Grand Tour, which was at that time popular particularly among English noblemen taking educational tours through Europe. His detailed descriptions of the France, Italy, Germany, and the Netherlands of the time provide a rich source for historians of the situation in the second half of the 18th century.

== Life ==
Little is known regarding his early years. He admittedly came from Ireland, though he spent most of his life in London. There he occupied himself as an author and translator. In the year 1749, he published the multi-volume work "The Grand Tour – containing an exact description of most of the cities, towns and remarkable places of Europe". This was the first detailed guidebook for English gentlemen wanting to go on the Grand Tour of Europe. Whether Nugent had actually undertaken this tour himself in unknown, although it is assumed on the basis of the detailed information and evident knowledge of the places depicted therein.

Nugent devoted himself in the following years to translating works by prominent jurists, philosophers, and political thinkers of his time, mostly from French into English. This included a 1750 translation of Montesquieu’s De l’esprit des lois into English as The Spirit of Laws, a 1751 translation of Jean-Jacques Burlamaqui’s Principes du droit politique as Principles of Politic Law (1752), and in 1756 a translation of Étienne Bonnot de Condillac’s Essai sur l’origine des connaissances humaines as Essay on the Origin of Human Knowledge.

Also in 1756, a newly updated version of his travelogue was published with the title "The Grand Tour, or, A journey through the Netherlands, Germany, Italy and France". In the year 1759, he published a translation of the French historian Philippe Macquer (1720-1770) of Roman History ("Chronological Abridgement of the Roman History"). He then devoted himself to the French history of Charles-Jean-Francois Henault, ("Chronological Abridgment of the History of France", 1762). Nugent received a doctorate of law from the Scottish University of Aberdeen in 1765. After this he planned to write a history of the Vandals, thus studying the source material on his trip to Germany. He traveled through northern Germany, from Hamburg through Lübeck to Mecklenburg, where he suspected to be the original homeland or the early settlement of the Vandals.

On his return to England, he not only published his history of the Vandals ("The History of Vandalia Containing the ancient and present state of the country of Mecklenburg") in 1766, but also in 1768 was published his German travel experiences in the form of several letters to a fictitious friend at home. This work (original title: Travels through Germany: containing observations on customs, manners, religion, government, commerce, arts, and antiquities: with a particular account of the Courts of Mecklenburg in a series of letters to a friend) was written, amongst others, at Hamburg, Lübeck and several cities and villages in the then Mecklenburg-Schwerin and Mecklenburg-Strelitz, including Schwerin, Rostock, Wismar, Ludwigslust, Doberan, Güstrow, Bützow, Waren, Neustrelitz, Mirow and Neubrandenburg.

In 1771 he wrote a book about the Florentine Renaissance sculptor Benvenuto Cellini. Inspired by the success of his travelogue, he now translated a guidebook of London which was the first work aimed at foreign readers visiting England. This book (original title: "A tour to London, or, New observations on England and its inhabitants") appeared in 1772, the same year that Nugent died in London.

Following his death, his guidebooks enjoyed yet even greater popularity. A third edition of his "Grand Tour" appeared in 1778. His two-volume travelogue about northern Germany – Travels through Germany – which appeared in 1768 gave great interest there. The Mecklenburg-based Professor Lorenz Karsten translated the work into German and published it in 1781 by Friedrich Nicolai. This book, in which among other things the Lübeck Dance of Death [Totentanz] is described, made Nugent famous in Germany and was largely abridged in 1938, as well as appearing in new annotated editions in 1998 and 2000. Goethe's translation of the life of Benvenuto Cellini from the year 1803 was partly based on the Italian original, and partly based on the English version by Thomas Nugent.

== See also ==
- Duvet
