= Mrs Bistow's Theatre =

Theatre in Kolkata, India

The Mrs Bistow's Theatre also known as Chowringhee Theatre, was an historic theatre in Calcutta (now named Kolkata) in India, founded in 1787. It was the third theatre in the city of Calcutta. It is known as the first theatre in India to employ actresses.

== History ==
The theatre was founded in 1787 by Emma Bistow, married to an English merchant. It was situated in Bistow's residence at the junction at Chowringhee and Theatre Road. Formally named Chowringhee Theatre, it was normally referred to as Mrs Bistow's Theatre after its founder and managing director. Bistow as considered a competent manager and also as a good actress on her own stage, particularly noted within "comedy and humorous singing".

The Mrs Bistow's Theatre was the third theater in Calcutta after the Calcutta Theatre and its predecessor, and became one of the two leading stages of Calcutta and a prominent rival stage to Calcutta Theatre. It was the first theatre in India to employ women on stage, which caused its rival stage Calcutta Theatre to employ actresses. In 1789, Emma Bristow introduced actresses brought from England. The theater was closed in 1790 when Emma bristow returned to England.

The foundation of this theatre was followed by the foundation of a number of more temporary theatres such as the theatres of Chandernagore (1808), The Athenaeum Lower (1812), Kidderpore (1815) and Dum Dum (1817), but it was not truly replaced as a prominent theatre until the foundation of the second theatre known as the Chowringhee Theatre, also known as the "Private Subscription Theatre" on Chowringhee Road (1813–1839).

== Sources ==
- P. Guha-Thakurta, Bengali Drama: Its Origin and Development
- Poonam Trivedi, Dennis Bartholomeusz, India's Shakespeare: Translation, Interpretation, and Performance
