= Maria Madeline Taylor =

Australian actress

Maria Madeline Taylor née Hill, also known as Madame Dhermainville (1805 – 13 May 1841), was an Australian stage actress. She was a star attraction of the Australian stage in Sydney during the 1830s, dubbed ‘the Queen of the Sydney stage’, and became known to the audience of Calcutta in India under the stage name Madame Dhermainville.

== Life ==
Maria Taylor was born to the actors Eliza Atkins and James Hill, and was educated in acting by a ‘Drury Lane education’ on the London stage. She arrived in Hobart in Van Diemen's Land in 1833. She made a success when she sang at a concert at the Hobart Courthouse, and was engaged at the Theatre Royal, Sydney, later the same year.

=== Career in Sydney ===
During her nine year's long career in Sydney, Taylor became known as ‘the Queen of the Sydney stage’, and played most of the most prestigious roles performed in Sydney at that time at both the Theatre Royal and Royal Victoria Theatre, among them being Romeo to Eliza Winstanley’s Juliet in 1835.

Sydney critics described her as ‘a pleasing lively little brunette, with a sparkling and expressive black eye, not particularly pretty, but far from plain', in possession of a ‘desirable stature of person, neither diminutive nor masculine – the graceful air of step – and the clear, distinct enunciation of voice’ and ‘One so lady like in her manner is indeed a rarity in this part of the world’; as an artist she was called elastic, versatile and natural in her performance style:

‘Mrs. Taylor is here quite unrivaled as an actress; as the versatility of her genius in such opposite characters as Don Giovanni and Mrs. Haller … and many other characters of an equally opposite nature, can fully testify’, and:
‘…it was the perfect manner in which Mrs. Taylor inhaled the spirit of the part that caused her to give so much satisfaction; her ease, vivacity, playful humour, then her deep emotion – were all evinced with the nicest discrimination; it was all emphatically natural…’

Alongside Ellen Douglass Hatch (1812–1838) whose career was parallel with hers and who was described by the Sydney Gazette of November 1834 as an actress of 'superior theatrical attainments', Taylor was arguably the most noted actress in Sydney in the 1830s.

=== Private life ===
Taylor was also known for the scandals surrounding her private life. After her spouse abandoned her and their child in 1834, she had a number of affairs, which attracted attention in the press. She defended herself in the press and was condemned by moral conservatives such as Reverend Dr. Lang and his followers. In 1836, she had a relationship with the con artist John Thomas Wilson. Wilson seduced and abandoned a Mrs. Cavill, whose brother Andrew Wyllie retaliated by accusing Wilson to consort with prostitutes, accusing Taylor of being one of them, which resulted in Taylor publicly accuse Andrew Wyllie in the press for slander. In 1839, she entered into a relationship with the French sea captain and swindler Pierre Largeteau. When Largeteau unlawfully sold the ship Ville de Bordeaux without being its owner in July 1840, Taylor left with him on his flight to Calcutta.

=== Calcutta ===
In Calcutta, Taylor and Largeteau took the names Count and Madame Dhermainville and lived a life of luxury, presenting herself as a French actress married into nobility. The whole affair became a sensation in French, English and colonial press. When Pierre Largeteau contracted cholera and died in 1841, she returned to acting and made her Calcutta debut in The Taming of the Shrew at the Sans Souci Theatre of Esther Leach. At this time, she was in a relationship with Captain George Hamilton Cox, Secretary of the Fire Insurance Company, an affair which attracted attention, particularly as he committed suicide in April 1841. Taylor herself died of cholera in May 13, 1841.

== Legacy ==
The Sydney press wrote:

"As an actress this lady was more successful than any other that ever trod the Sydney boards. The versatility of her talent and the elasticity of her spirits knew no bounds. In private life, whatever indiscretions she might have been guilty of, were rather the result of a volatile and giddy disposition, inseparable from her professional pursuits, than of a bad heart."
