= 1841 in Iran =

- Decades
- See also: Other events of 1841; Years in Iran

The following lists events that happened during 1841 in the Qajar era.

== Incumbents ==
- Monarch: Mohammad Shah Qajar
