= Ellen Douglass Hatch =

Australian actress

Ellen Douglass Hatch, née Hatch, stage name Ellen Douglass (c. 1812 – 1838), was an Australian stage actress. She was a star attraction of the Australian stage in Sydney during the 1830s, and belonged to the pioneer generation of professional stage actors in Australia.

She was engaged at the Theatre Royal, Sydney, which opened in 1832 as the first theatre in Sydney Australia. Among her most known parts where Lady Macbeth and Alicia in Jane Shore. Alongside Maria Madeline Taylor, whose career was parallel with hers, she was arguably the most noted actress in Sydney in the 1830s. She was described by the Sydney Gazette of November 1834 as an actress of 'superior theatrical attainments'.

Her obituary stated:

The patrons of the Drama will be sorry to hear of the death of Miss Douglass, who, after a protracted illness, breathed her last yesterday morning. The stage will experience a loss by the demise of this actress, who in the higher walks of tragedy was unequalled in Sydney. Her Lady Macbeth, Alicia in Jane Shore, and many other characters of a similar cast, have not been surpassed or even equalled in this Colony. Douglass was an assumed name, only Hatch was the proper name of the deceased.

== Sources ==
- Jane Woollard: The elasticity of her spirits’: Actresses and resilience on the 19th century colonial stage
- Resilience: Revive, Restore, Reconnect, Australasian Association for Theatre, Drama and Performance Studies (ADSA) 2016 Conference Proceedings, Volume 1, ed. Rebecca Scollen and Michael Smalley, Artsworx, 2016.
