= Esther Leach =

Colonial-Indian English stage actress (1809–1843)

Esther Leach (1809-November 1843) was an English stage actress and theatre director active in colonial India. She was an important figure in the theatre history of India, founded and managed the Sans Souci Theatre (1839-49), one of the first professional English theatres in the city of Calcutta, and regarded as the leading lady of the Calcutta stage in her time. She was referred to as the Indian Sarah Siddons.

== Life ==
Esther Leach was the daughter of a British soldier, a "Mr. Flatman", stationed in Meerut. She married the non-commissioned officer John Leach and became the mother of the actress "Mrs. Anderson".

Esther Leach was given scholastic training by the regimental pedagogue in Berhampur. She performed in amateur theatrical performances given for the army, and attracted great attention and popularity for her performance. The officers presented her with the works of Shakespeare. She can be argued to have been the first professional actress in India.

She was active at the Calcutta Theatre and the Dum Dum Theatre in Calcutta and, in 1822, the manager director of the Dum Dum Theatre. Between 1825 and 1838, she was the leading lady and star attraction of the Chowringhee Theatre. Her career at the Chowringhee Theatre took place in parallel with the theatre's golden age, and its success has been attributed partially to her. She departed India for England in 1838.

Upon her return in 1839, she founded the Sans Souci Theatre after the destruction of the Chowringhee Theatre. She founded the theatre in collaboration with the art connoisseur Mr. Stocqueler and the support of the elite of Calcutta, who felt the need for a theatre to replace the Chowringhee Theatre, and the Sans Souci Theatre was inaugurated in a temporary building in August 1839, and inaugurated its building on 8 March 1841. It was described as an elegant little theatre with room for 400 people. She was remarkably successful with her theatre and attracted both the British as well as the Indian audience in Calcutta.

On 2 November 1843, her dress caught fire during a performance on the Sans Souci. She contracted severe burn injuries, and died a few days after. On her deathbed, she transferred the ownership of the theatre to her colleague Nina Baxter.
