= 1841 =

1841 in various calendars
- Gregorian calendar: 1841; MDCCCXLI
- Ab urbe condita: 2594
- Armenian calendar: 1290; ԹՎ ՌՄՂ
- Assyrian calendar: 6591
- Balinese saka calendar: 1762–1763
- Bengali calendar: 1247–1248
- Berber calendar: 2791
- British Regnal year: 4 Vict. 1 – 5 Vict. 1
- Buddhist calendar: 2385
- Burmese calendar: 1203
- Byzantine calendar: 7349–7350
- Chinese calendar: 庚子年 (Metal Rat); 4538 or 4331 — to — 辛丑年 (Metal Ox); 4539 or 4332
- Coptic calendar: 1557–1558
- Discordian calendar: 3007
- Ethiopian calendar: 1833–1834
- Hebrew calendar: 5601–5602
- Hindu calendars
- Vikram Samvat: 1897–1898
- Shaka Samvat: 1762–1763
- Kali Yuga: 4941–4942
- Holocene calendar: 11841
- Igbo calendar: 841–842
- Iranian calendar: 1219–1220
- Islamic calendar: 1256–1257
- Japanese calendar: Tenpō 12 (天保１２年)
- Javanese calendar: 1768–1769
- Julian calendar: Gregorian minus 12 days
- Korean calendar: 4174
- Minguo calendar: 71 before ROC 民前71年
- Nanakshahi calendar: 373
- Thai solar calendar: 2383–2384
- Tibetan calendar: ལྕགས་ཕོ་བྱི་བ་ལོ་ (male Iron-Rat); 1967 or 1586 or 814 — to — ལྕགས་མོ་གླང་ལོ་ (female Iron-Ox); 1968 or 1587 or 815

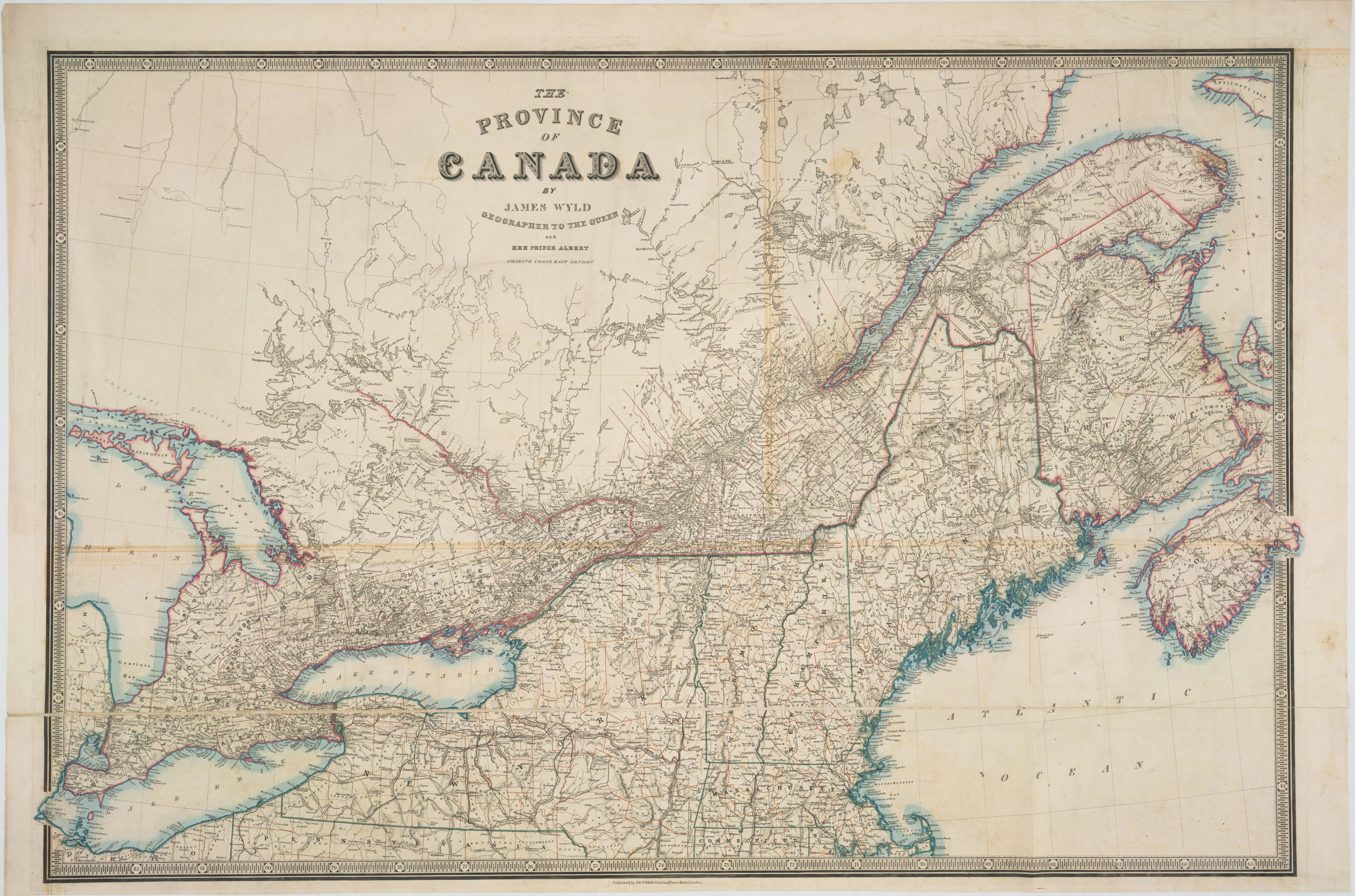
February 11: The Province of Canada is created from the merger of two British colonies, Upper Canada (containing much of Ontario) and Lower Canada (Quebec and Labrador).

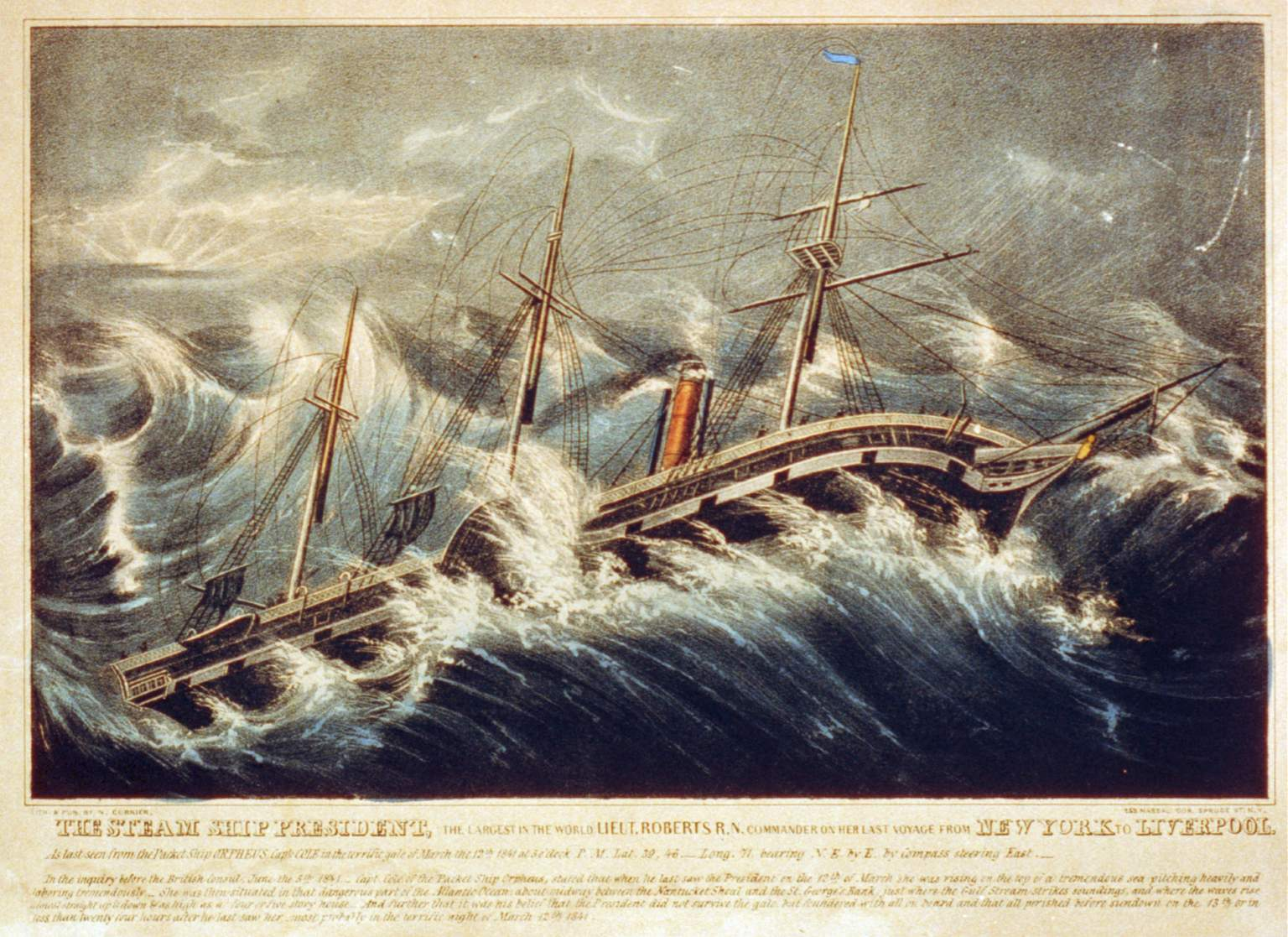
March 12: All 136 passengers and crew of the SS President are killed in an Atlantic storm.

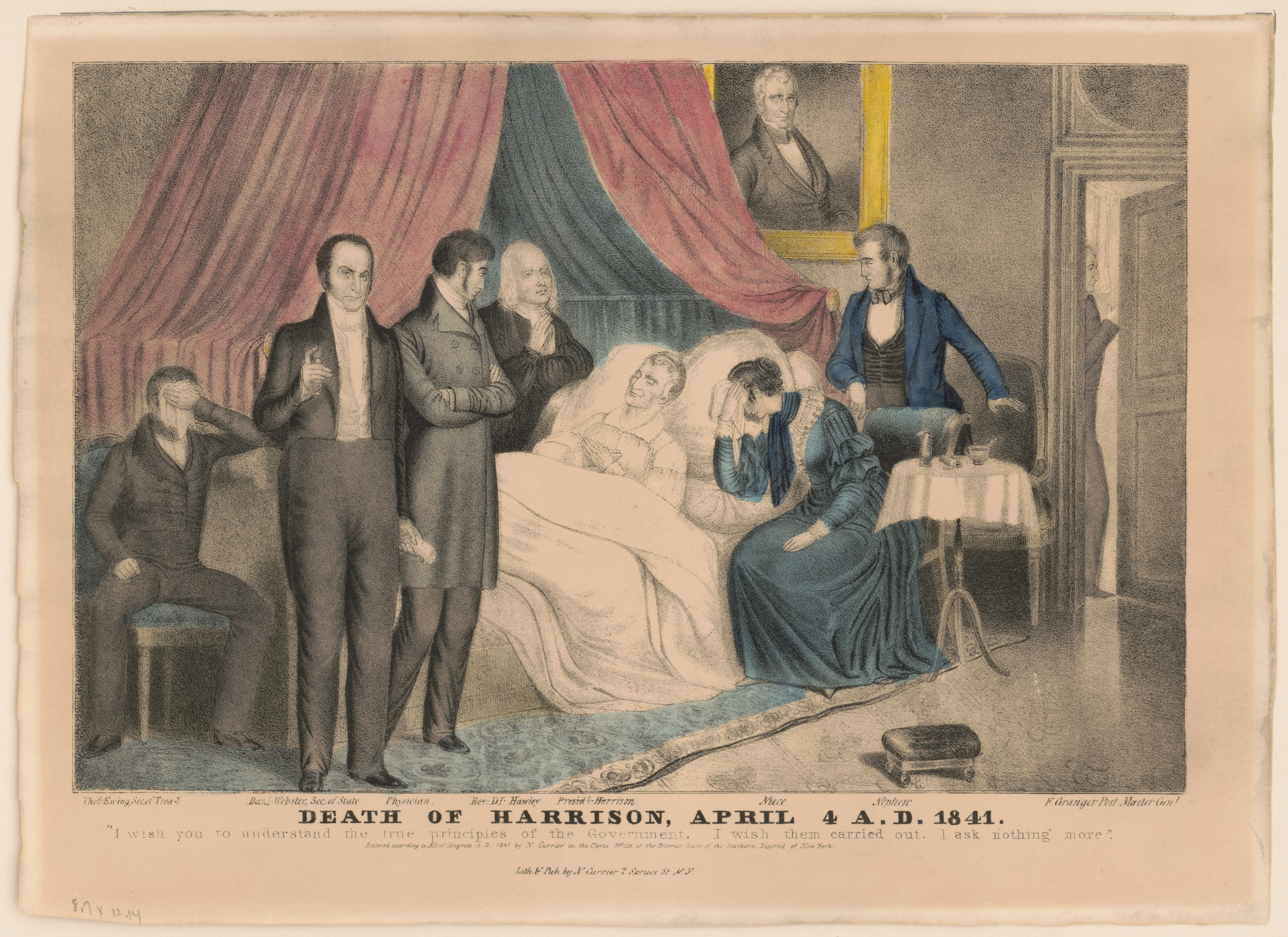
April 4: U.S. President William Henry Harrison dies after only 30 days in office.

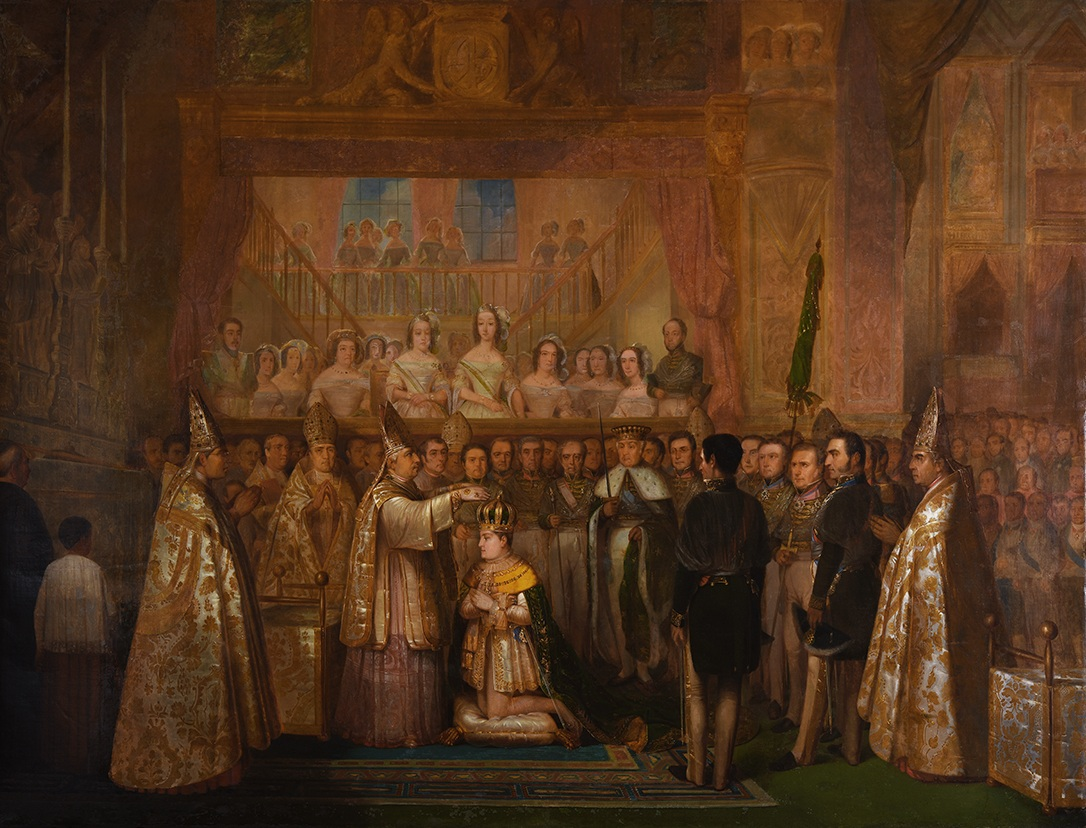
July 18: Coronation of Emperor Pedro II of Brazil.

1841 (MDCCCXLI) was a common year starting on Friday of the Gregorian calendar and a common year starting on Wednesday of the Julian calendar, the 1841st year of the Common Era (CE) and Anno Domini (AD) designations, the 841st year of the 2nd millennium, the 41st year of the 19th century, and the 2nd year of the 1840s decade. As of the start of 1841, the Gregorian calendar was 12 days ahead of the Julian calendar, which remained in localized use until 1923.

== Events ==
=== January–March ===
- January 20 – Charles Elliot of the United Kingdom and Qishan of the Qing dynasty agree to the Convention of Chuenpi.
- January 26 – Britain occupies Hong Kong. Later in the year, the first census of the island records a population of about 7,500.
- January 27 – The active volcano Mount Erebus in Antarctica is discovered, and named by James Clark Ross.
- January 28 – Ross discovers the "Victoria Barrier", later known as the Ross Ice Shelf. On the same voyage, he discovers the Ross Sea, Victoria Land and Mount Terror.
- January 30 –
  - El Salvador proclaims itself an independent republic, bringing an end to the Federal Republic of Central America.
  - A fire destroys two-thirds of the city of Mayagüez, Puerto Rico.
- February 4 – The first known reference is made to Groundhog Day, celebrated in North America, in the diary of a James Morris.
- February 10 – The Act of Union (British North America Act, 1840) is proclaimed in Canada.
- February 11 – Upper Canada and Lower Canada are merged to create the United Province of Canada.
- February 18 – The first ongoing filibuster in the United States Senate begins, and lasts until March 11.
- March 9 – United States v. The Amistad: The Supreme Court of the United States rules in the case, that the Africans who seized control of the ship had been taken into slavery illegally.
- March 12 – All 136 passengers and crew on steamship SS President, commanded by legendary captain Richard Roberts (known for saying "I'd go to sea in a bathtub"), are killed when the ship founders in rough seas.

=== April–June ===
- April 4 – President William Henry Harrison dies of pneumonia, aged 68, becoming the first president of the United States to die in office, and at one month, the American president with the shortest term served. He is succeeded by Vice President John Tyler.
- May – The Sino-Sikh War begins.
- May 3 – New Zealand becomes a separate British colony, having previously been administered as part of the Colony of New South Wales.
- May 22 – The Georgian province of Guria revolts against the Russian Empire.
- June 6 – The United Kingdom Census is held, the first to record names and approximate ages of every household member, and to be administered nationally.
- June 21 – St. John's College, later Fordham University, is founded in The Bronx by Jesuits.
- June 28 – The ballet Giselle is first presented by the Ballet du Théâtre de l'Académie Royale de Musique, at the Salle Le Peletier in Paris, France, with music by Adolphe Adam and Italian ballerina Carlotta Grisi in the title role.

=== July–September ===
August 26: Battle of Amoy

- July 5 – Thomas Cook arranges his first railway excursion in England.
- July 17 – The first edition of the humorous magazine Punch is published in London.
- July 18 (Sunday)
  - Emperor Pedro II of Brazil is crowned in Rio de Janeiro.
  - The sixth bishop of Calcutta, Daniel Wilson, and Dr. James Taylor, Civil Surgeon at Dhaka, establish the first modern educational institution on the Indian subcontinent, Dhaka College.
- July 20 – The Mercantile Agency (ancestor of Dun & Bradstreet) is founded in New York City by Lewis Tappan.
- July 31 – Scottish missionary David Livingstone arrives at Kuruman in the Northern Cape, his first posting in Africa.
- August 11 – Frederick Douglass speaks in front of the Anti-Slavery Convention in Nantucket, Massachusetts.
- August 16 – U.S. President John Tyler vetoes a bill which called for the re-establishment of the Second Bank of the United States. Enraged Whig Party members riot outside the White House, in the most violent demonstration on White House grounds in U.S. history.
- August 20–October 16 – The Niger expedition of 1841 begins sailing up the Niger River by paddle steamers, under the auspices of the British Society for the Extinction of the Slave Trade and the Civilisation of Africa; it is largely abortive, due to the high incidence of disease among the crews.
- September 24 – Sarawak is broken away from Brunei, and James Brooke is appointed Rajah.

=== October–December ===
- October 10 – First Opium War: Battle of Chinhai – British capture a Chinese garrison.
- October 13 – First Opium War: British occupy Ningbo.
- October 16 – Queen's University is founded in Kingston, Ontario, by Rev. Thomas Liddell, who carries a Royal Charter from Queen Victoria, and becomes the school's first principal.
- October 30 – A fire at the Tower of London destroys its Grand Armoury and causes a quarter of a million pounds' worth of damage.
- November – The settlement of Dallas, Texas, is founded by John Neely Bryan.
- November 13 – Scottish surgeon James Braid first sees a demonstration of animal magnetism by Charles Lafontaine in Manchester, which leads to his study of the phenomenon that he (Braid) eventually calls hypnotism.
- December 20 – The first multilateral treaty for the suppression of the African slave trade, the Treaty for the Suppression of the African Slave Trade, signed in London by the representatives of Austria, Britain, France, Prussia and Russia.
- December 23 – First Anglo-Afghan War: At a meeting with the Afghan general Akbar Khan, British diplomat Sir William Hay Macnaghten is shot dead at close quarters.
- December 27 – Franz Liszt gives a piano recital at the Sing-Akademie zu Berlin to an enthusiastic audience, retrospectively marked as the beginning of Lisztomania, which will accompany his tours across Europe during the decade.

=== Date unknown ===
- John Augustus develops the concept of probation in Boston, Massachusetts.

=== Ongoing ===
- First Opium War (1839–42)
- First Anglo-Afghan War (1839–42)

== Births ==
=== January–June ===
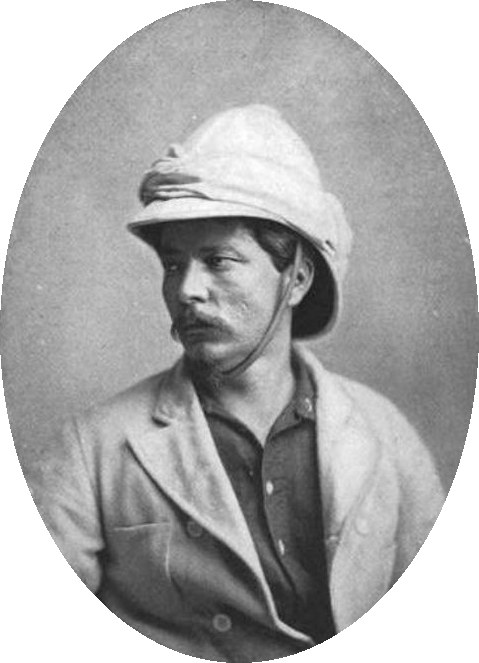
Henry Morton Stanley

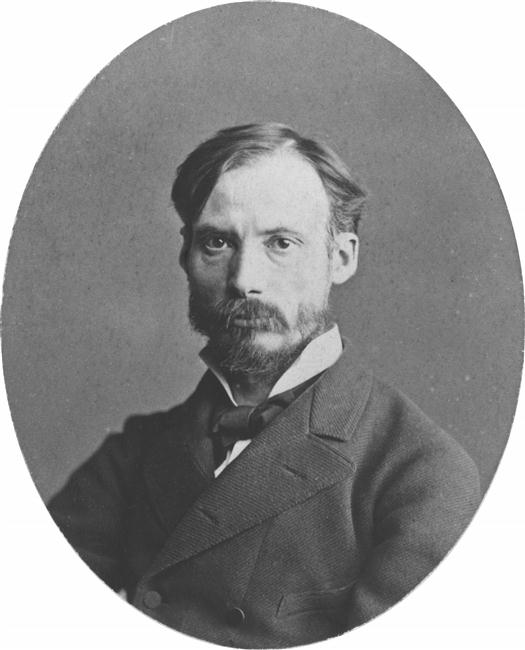
Pierre-Auguste Renoir

- January 8
  - Hakeem Noor-ud-Din, Muslim scholar, 1st Caliph of the Ahmadiyya Muslim Community in Islam (d. 1914)
  - Kate Stone, American diarist (d. 1907)
- January 14 – Berthe Morisot, French painter (d. 1895)
- January 15 – Frederick Stanley, 16th Earl of Derby, English-Canadian politician, soldier (d. 1908)
- January 23 – Benoît-Constant Coquelin, French actor, Cyrano de Bergerac (d. 1909)
- January 25 – John Fisher, 1st Baron Fisher, British admiral (d. 1920)
- January 27 – Alexandru Candiano-Popescu, Romanian general, lawyer, journalist, and poet (d. 1901)
- January 28 – Sir Henry Morton Stanley, Welsh explorer, journalist (d. 1904)
- January 30 – Félix Faure, President of France (d. 1899)
- February 2 – François-Alphonse Forel, Swiss hydrologist (d. 1912)
- February 4 – Clément Ader, French engineer, inventor, and airplane pioneer (d. 1926)
- February 9 – Sigrid Torsk, Swedish jewellery designer (d. 1924)
- February 10 – Alfred Heaver, English property developer (d. 1901)
- February 15 – Manuel Ferraz de Campos Sales, 4th President of Brazil (d. 1913)
- February 16 – Armand Guillaumin, French painter, lithographer (d. 1927)
- February 24 – Carl Gräbe, German chemist (d. 1927)
- February 25 – Pierre-Auguste Renoir, French painter (d. 1919)
- March 1 – Luigi Luzzatti, Italian financier, economist, philosopher, and jurist, 20th Prime Minister of Italy (d. 1927)
- March 8 – Oliver Wendell Holmes Jr., Associate Justice of the Supreme Court of the United States (d. 1935)
- March 15 – Pietro Bonilli, Italian Roman Catholic priest and blessed (d. 1935)
- April 3 – Hermann Carl Vogel, German astrophysicist, astronomer (d. 1907)
- April 9 – William George Aston, British consular official (d. 1911)
- April 11 – John Stillwell Stark, American publisher of Ragtime (d. 1927)
- April 13 – Louis-Ernest Barrias, French sculptor (d. 1905)
- May 10 – James Gordon Bennett Jr., American newspaper publisher (d. 1918)
- May 14 – Sir Squire Bancroft, English actor (d. 1926)
- May 15 – Clarence Dutton, American geologist (d. 1912)
- June 1 – Edward Lyon Buchwalter, Union captain in the American Civil War, businessman, and banker (d. 1933)

=== July–December ===
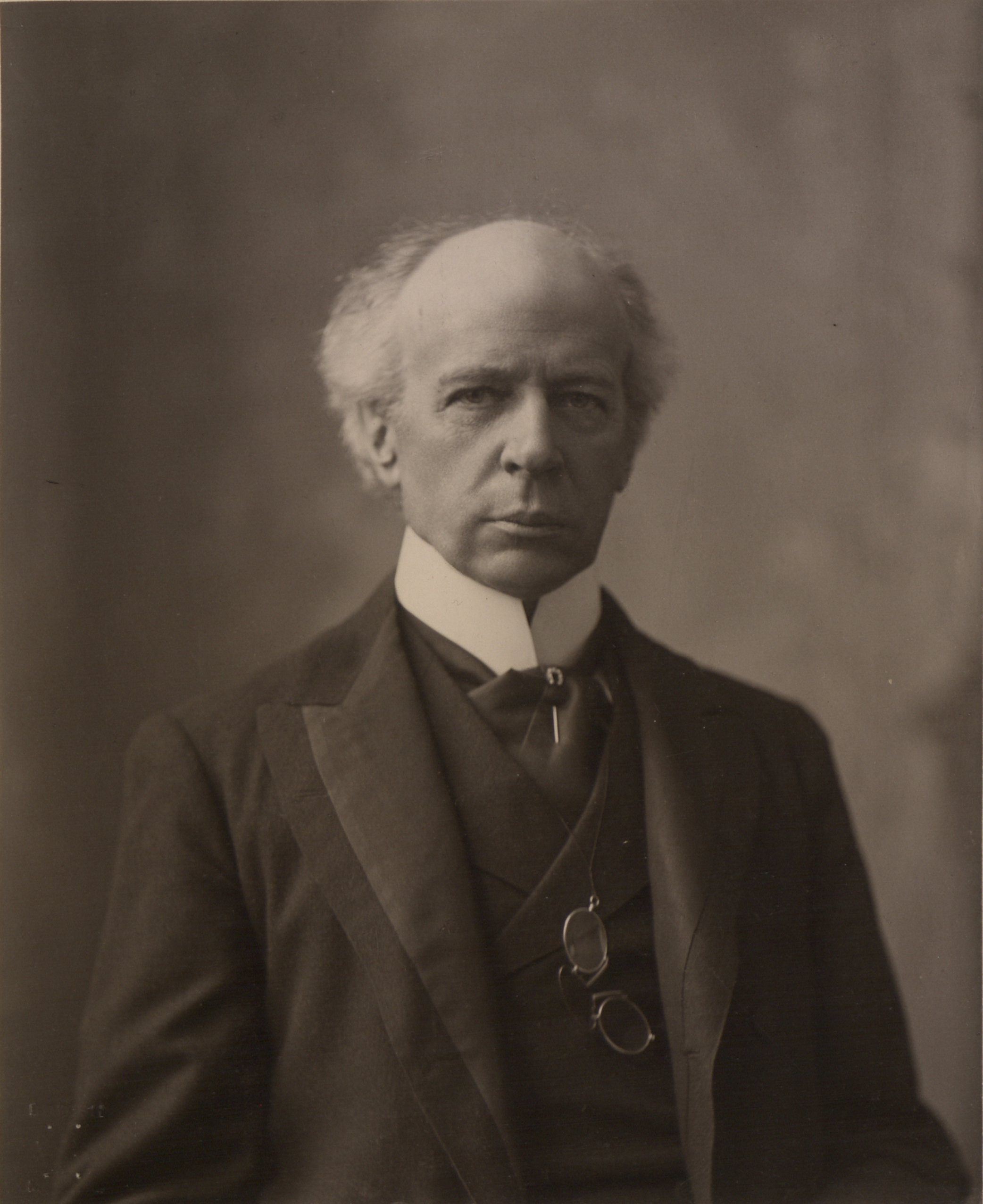
Wilfrid Laurier

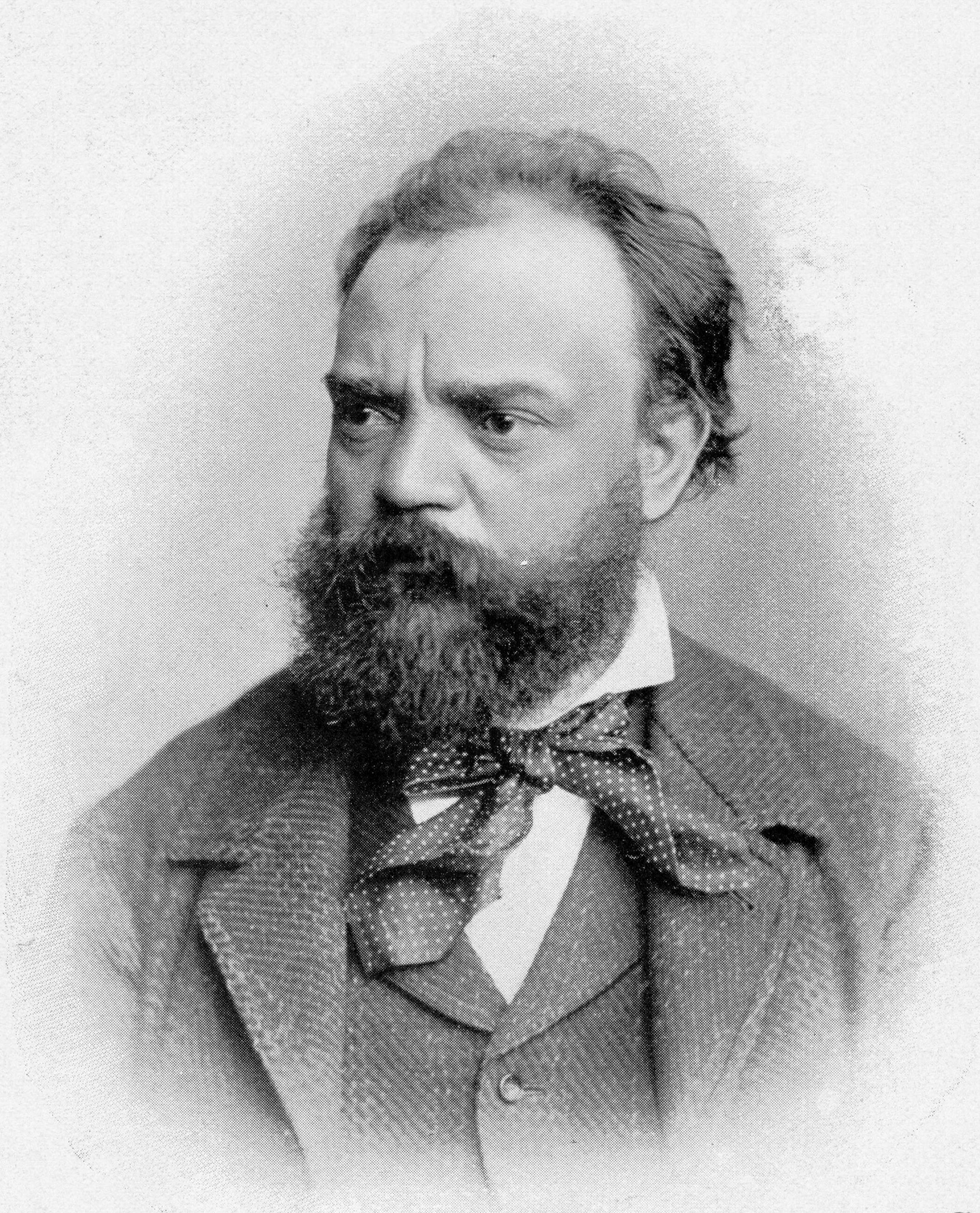
Antonín Dvořák

- July 2 – Alexander Mikhaylovich Zaytsev, Russian chemist (d. 1910)
- July 4 – Josef Drásal, the tallest Czech (d. 1886)
- July 5 – Mary Arthur McElroy, de facto First Lady of the United States (d. 1917)
- August 6 – Florence Baker, Hungarian-born explorer (d. 1916)
- August 10 – Oronhyatekha, Canadian Mohawk physician, CEO of an international benefit society, native statesman, scholar, rights campaigner and international shooter (d. 1907)
- August 14 – Joaquín Vara de Rey y Rubio, Spanish general (d. 1898)
- August 24 – Anna Hierta-Retzius, Swedish women's rights activist (d. 1924)
- August 25 – Emil Kocher, Swiss medical researcher, recipient of the Nobel Prize in Physiology or Medicine (d. 1917)
- August 28 – Louis Le Prince, French inventor, Father of Cinematography (d. 1890)
- September 8
  - Antonín Dvořák, Czech composer (d. 1904)
  - Charles J. Guiteau, American lawyer, assassin of James A. Garfield (d. 1882)
- September 10 – Yamaji Motoharu, Japanese general (d. 1897)
- September 28 – Georges Clemenceau, French statesman (d. 1929)
- October 4 – Prudente de Morais, 3rd President of Brazil (d. 1902)
- October 7 – King Nicholas I of Montenegro (d. 1921)
- October 16 – Prince Itō Hirobumi, 4-time prime minister of Japan (d. 1909)
- November 6
  - Nelson W. Aldrich, Senator from Rhode Island (d. 1915)
  - Armand Fallières, 9th President of France (d. 1931)
- November 9 – King Edward VII of the United Kingdom (d. 1910)
- November 13 – Edward Burd Grubb Jr., American Civil War Union Brevet Brigadier General (d.1913)
- November 20 – Sir Wilfrid Laurier, 7th Prime Minister of Canada (d. 1919)
- November 25 – Ernst Schröder, German mathematician and academic (d. 1902)
- December 4 – Anna Tuschinski, Esperantist from Danzig (d. 1939)
- December 6 – Frédéric Bazille, French painter (k. 1870)
- December 20 – Ferdinand Buisson, French pacifist, recipient of the Nobel Peace Prize (d. 1932)

=== Date unknown ===
- Arousyak Papazian, Armenian actress, writer (d. 1907)

== Deaths ==
=== January–June ===
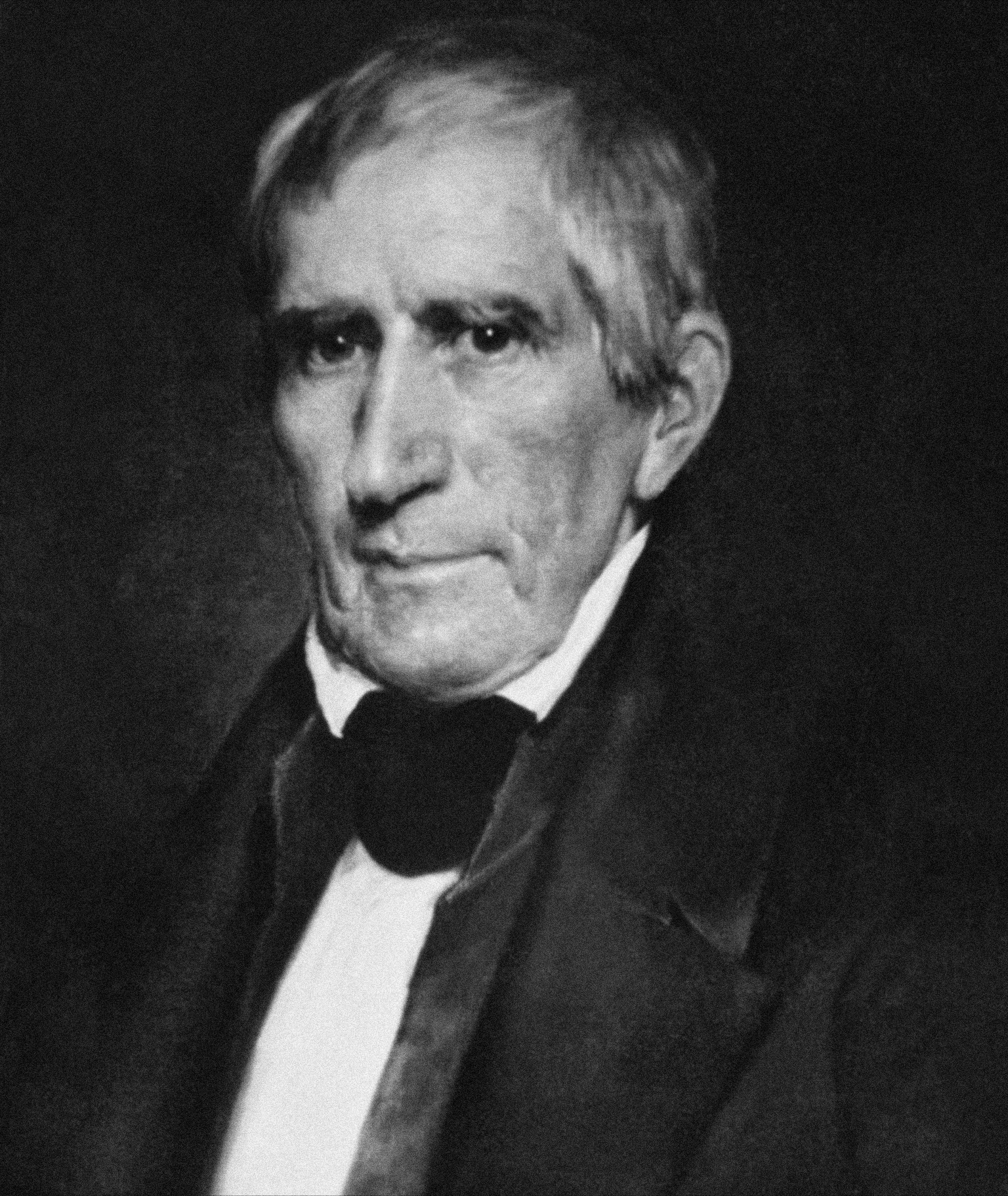
William Henry Harrison

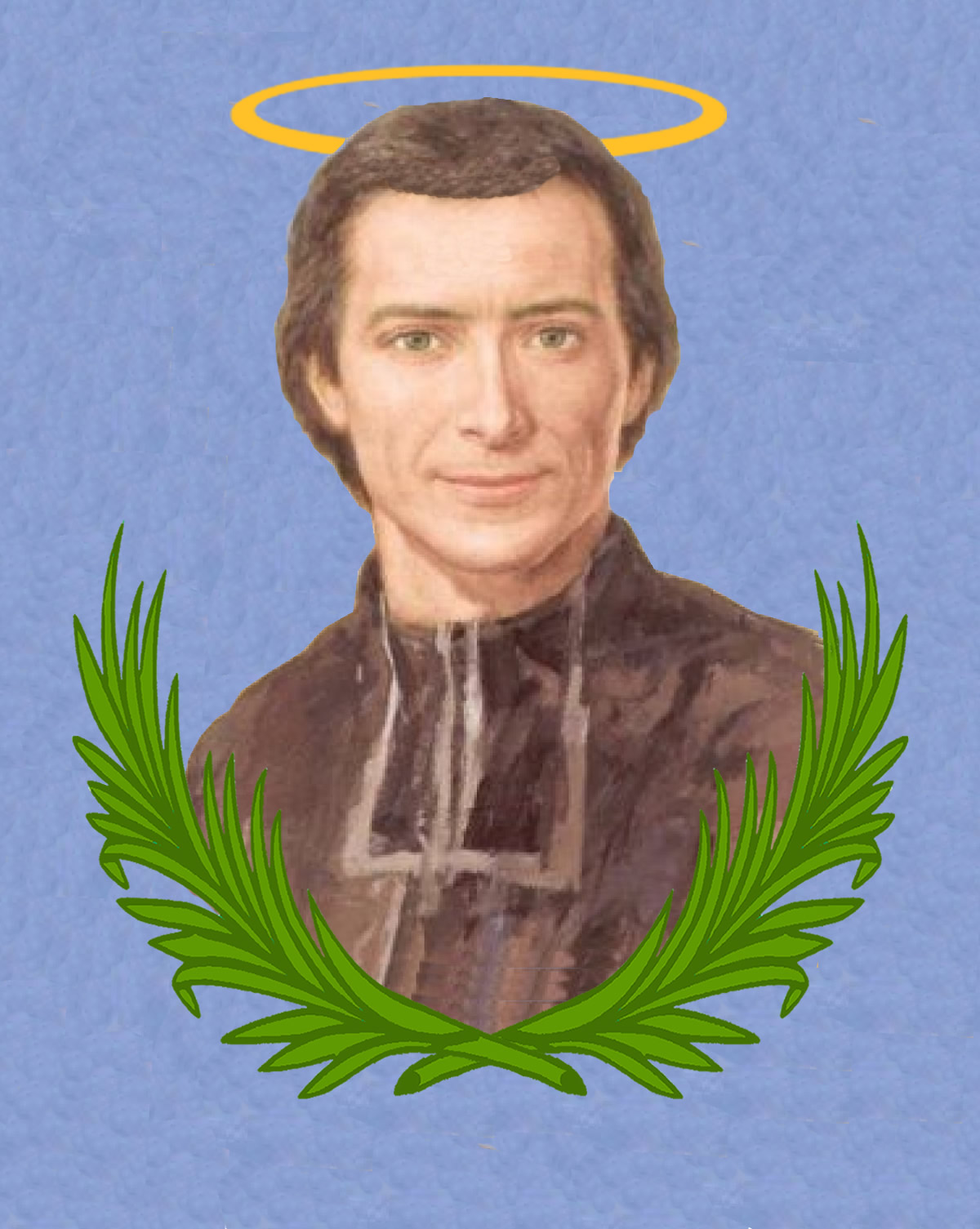
Saint Peter Chanel

- January 15 – Johann Jacob Friedrich Wilhelm Parrot, Baltic-German naturalist, traveller (b. 1792)
- January 20 – Jørgen Jørgensen, Danish adventurer (b. 1780)
- February 12 – Sir Astley Cooper, British surgeon and anatomist (b. 1768)
- February 17 – Ferdinando Carulli, Italian guitarist (b. 1770)
- March 1 – Claude-Victor Perrin, Duc de Belluno, French marshal (b. 1764)
- March 12 – Richard Roberts, captain of SS President (b. 1803)
- March 16 – Félix Savart, French physicist (b. 1791)
- April 4 – William Henry Harrison, American military officer and politician, 9th President of the United States (b. 1773)
- April 10 – William Lloyd, Welsh Anglican priest turned schoolteacher, Methodist preacher (b. 1771)
- April 16 – Frederick Reynolds, English playwright (b. 1764)
- April 28 – Peter Chanel, French Roman Catholic priest, missionary, and saint (martyred) (b. 1803)
- April 30 – Peter Andreas Heiberg, Danish author, philologist (b. 1758)
- May 13 – Maria Madeline Taylor, Australian stage actor (b. 1805)
- May 16 – Marie Boivin, French midwife, inventor, and obstetrics writer (b. 1773)
- May 20 – Joseph Blanco White, British theologian (b. 1775)
- May 23 – Franz Xaver von Baader, German philosopher, theologian (b. 1765)
- June 1
  - Nicolas Appert, French inventor (b. 1749)
  - David Wilkie, Scottish artist (b. 1785)

=== July–December ===
- July – Mary Rogers ("Beautiful Cigar Girl"), American murder victim (b. c. 1820)
- August 16 – Fernando Errázuriz Aldunate, Chilean politician, President of Chile (b.c 1777)
- August 24 – Theodore Edward Hook, English author (b. 1788)
- September 25 – John Chandler, American politician (b. 1762)
- October 9 – Karl Friedrich Schinkel, German architect (b. 1781)
- November 18 – Agustín Gamarra, Peruvian general and politician, 10th and 14th President of Peru (b. 1785)
- December 4 – David Daniel Davis, British physician (b. 1777)
- December 23 – William Hay Macnaghten, Anglo-Indian diplomat (b. 1793)
