= Pierre Macquer =

French chemist (1718–1784)

Pierre-Joseph Macquer
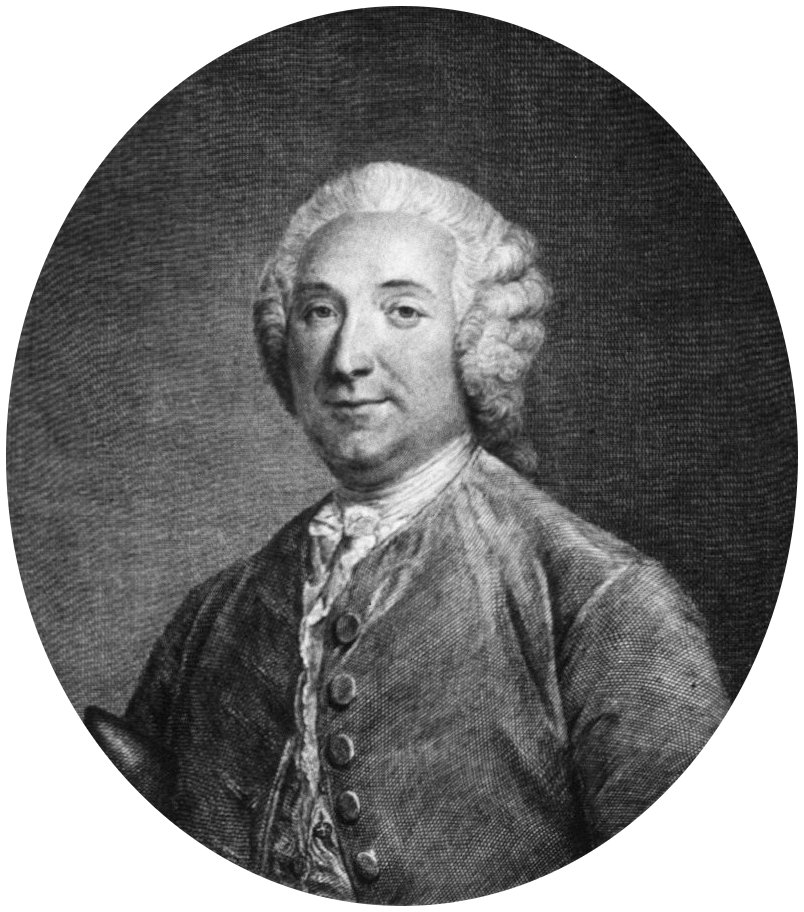
- Born: 9 October 1718; Paris, France
- Died: 15 February 1784 (aged 65); Paris, France
- Known for: Dictionary of Chemistry
- Scientific career
- Fields: Chemistry

Pierre-Joseph Macquer (9 October 1718 – 15 February 1784) was an influential French chemist.

He is known for his Dictionnaire de chymie (1766). He was also involved in practical applications, to medicine and industry, such as the French development of porcelain. He worked as a chemist in industries, such as the Manufacture de Sèvres or the Gobelins Manufactory. He was an opponent of Lavoisier's theories. The scholar Phillipe Macquer was his brother.

In 1752 Macquer showed that the pigment Prussian blue could be decomposed by alkaline solutions into a solid iron hydroxide compound and an aqueous solution of Ferrocyanide.

In his 1749 Elemens de Chymie Theorique, Macquer builds on Geoffroy's 1718 affinity table, by devoting a whole chapter to the topic of chemical affinity:

All the experiments that have been hitherto carried out, and those that are still being daily performed, concur in proving that between different bodies, whether principles or compounds, there is an agreement, relation, affinity or attraction (if you will have it so), which disposes certain bodies to unite with one another, while with others they are unable to contract any union: it is this effect, whatever be its cause, which will help us to give a reason for all the phenomena furnished by chemistry, and to tie them together.

He became adjunct Chemist at the French Academy of Sciences the 5th of April 1745. He later became Associate Chemist in 1766 before being granted the permanent Chair of Chemistry in 1772. In 1768, Macquer was elected a foreign member of the Royal Swedish Academy of Sciences. In 1775, he was elected a member to the American Philosophical Society.

Macquer's salt, also named monopotassium arsenate (KH_{2}AsO_{4}) is named in his honor.

== Works ==
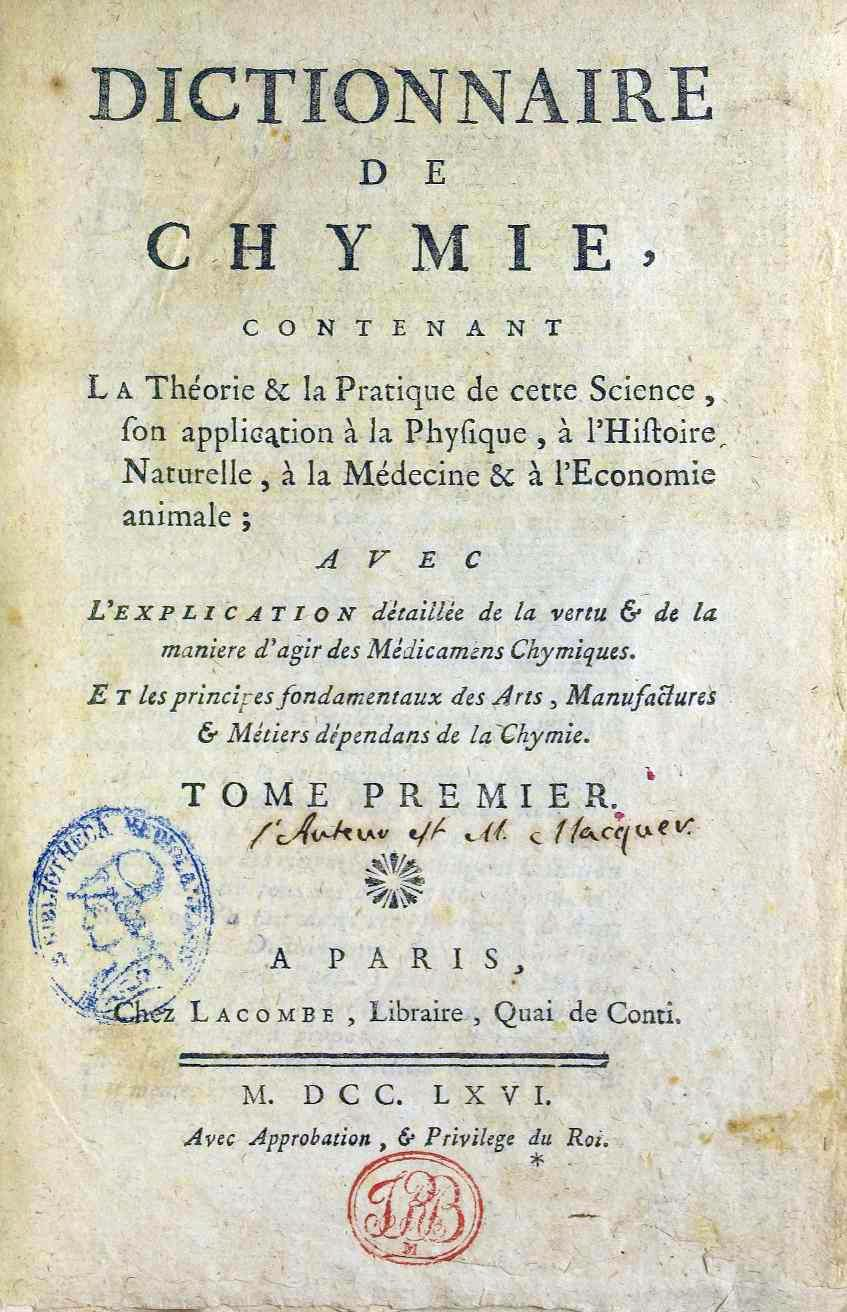
Dictionnaire de chymie, 1766

- 1756: Elemens de Chymietheoretique
- 1766: Dictionnaire portatif des arts et metiers, volume 1
- 1766: Dictionnaire portatif des arts et metiers, volume 2
- Elemens de chymie theorique (in French). Paris: Jean Thomas Herissant (1.). 1749.
- Dictionnaire de chymie (in French). Vol. 1. Paris: Laurent Durand. 1766.
- Dictionnaire de chymie (in French). Vol. 2. Paris: Jacques Lacombe. 1766.
