= Sans Souci Theatre (Calcutta) =

Sans Souci Theatre was a historical colonial-British theatre in Calcutta in India, active from 1839 to 1849 (in its own building from 1841). It was the main venue for British theatre in Calcutta, as well as India, during is duration. It was also to be the only public theatre in Calcutta and India long after its demise.

== History ==
In May 1838, the British theatre in Calcutta, the Chowringhee Theatre, burned down. One of its most popular star actors, Esther Leach, suggested the construction of a new theatre to replace it. She was supported by the art connoisseur Mr. Stocqueler, and funds collected from the British and elite Indian theatre enthusiasts of Calcutta, such as Governor-General Lord Auckland and Prince Dwarkanath Tagore.

She opened the Sans Souci Theatre on 21 August 1839. It was by that time situated on the bottom floor of St. Andrew's Library at Waterloo Street, which was converted in to a theatre hall until a proper theatre building could be constructed. The theatre hall had room for 400 seats and was described as an elegant and sufficient locality.

The new building of the Sans Souci Theatre was inaugurated on No. 10 Park Street on 8 March 1841. The playhouse was a large building designed by J. W. Collins. The Sans Souci Theatre enjoyed remarkable success during its first years, when Esther Leach was its manager and director. It attracted both British as well as the elite Indian Bengali audience of Calcutta. On 2 November 1843, Esther Leach contracted severe burn injuries onstage and died. She transferred the ownership of the theatre to her colleague Nina Baxter. Baxter is described as a skillful actor, but she had no success. James Barry took over the theatre in 1844. It was on Sans Souci Theatre that Esther Leach's daughter "Mrs. Anderson" debuted in 1848. The perhaps most significant occasion on the Sans Souci Theatre was on 19 August 1848, when Baboo Baishnab Charan Addy performed the lead role of Othello, which was the first time an Indian actor performed in an English role in an English theatre on stage.

=== Closure ===
The Sans Souci Theatre never really recuperated after the death of Esther Leach, and it was forced to close in 1849. While British theatre companies often visited Calcutta on tours to India, there was no new British theatre founded in Caclutta to replace the Sans Souci Theatre the years after its closure, and the theatre audience took to visit the performances of the school theatres of the David Hare Seminary and the Oriental Seminary.
