= Darren Henault =

American interior designer and decorator (born 1965)

- Born: Darren N. Henault; June 1, 1965 (age 61); Rhode Island, U.S.
- Education: Boston University (BA); Fashion Institute of Technology (Certificate)
- Occupations: Interior designer, decorator, retailer
- Years active: 1996 - present
- Partner: Michael Bassett (1996–present)
- Children: 2
- Website: darrenhenault.com

Darren N. Henault (born June 1, 1965) is an American interior designer and decorator who is primarily active in New York City and Millbrook, New York. His designs have been featured in Architectural Digest, Elle Décor, House and Garden, New York Magazine and House Beautiful. During the COVID-19 pandemic, Henault launched Tent in Amenia, New York, where he sells designed custom furniture and sourced home decor items.

== Early life and education ==
Henault was born on June 1, 1965 in Rhode Island. He was one of four children to Robert R. Henault (born 1937), who worked in the textile industry and owned several mills (Lincoln Textile Corporation), and Joan E. Henault (née Lafond; 1938–2024).

He is primarily descended from French Canadians from Quebec who emigrated to the Woonsocket, Rhode Island area after the civil war. Henault completed a Bachelor of Arts at Boston University as well as a certificate at the Fashion Institute of Technology.

== Personal life ==
He and his partner, attorney Michael Bassett, have two daughters and currently reside in Millbrook, New York.
