= Demoiselle Conradi =

German opera singer

Demoiselle Conradi, also known as Madame Conradi or Madame Conradine (born c. 1680 –died c. 1720), was a German opera singer. She was one of the first professional female opera singers in Germany. She was famous in her time. She was engaged at the Hamburg opera in 1690–1709, and also performed in Brunswick and Berlin.
