= Philippe Macquer =

French historian and lawyer (1720–1770)

Philippe Macquer (15 February 1720, Paris – 27 January 1770) was a French historian and lawyer. His brother was the chemist Pierre Joseph Macquer.

== Life ==
He came from a family of Scottish origins. His health did not allow him to devoted himself to being a lawyer to the Parlement of Paris and so he dedicated himself to literature. He is notable for his summaries of history, known for their clarity and precision in a similar vein to président Hénault. He contributed to the Dictionnaire portatif des arts et métiers (1766, 2 vol. in-8°, republished and expanded by abbé Pierre Jaubert as Dictionnaire raisonné universel des arts et métiers, 1773, 4 vol.). This work was strongly critiqued by Melchior Grimm, spokesman for the Encyclopédistes - he accused Macquer of plagiarism. The controversy is analysed by Jacques Proust.

== Works ==
- Abrégé chronologique de l'histoire ecclésiastique, de 33 à 1700, 1751, 2 volumes; 1757; expanded by abbé Joseph Antoine Toussaint Dinouart, 1768, 3 volumes; published in Italian, 1757; published in German by abbé Rauscher, Vienna, 1788, 4 volumes in octavo
- Annales romaines ou abrégé chronologique de l'histoire romaine depuis la fondation de Rome jusqu'aux empereurs, 1756; La Haye, 1757; translated into English by Thomas Nugent
- Abrégé chronologique de l'histoire d'Espagne et de Portugal, collaboration with Jacques Lacombe and Charles-Jean-François Hénault, 1759, 2 volumes
- Dictionnaire portatif des Arts et Métiers, contenant en abrégé l’histoire, la description & la police des arts & métiers, des fabriques & manufactures de France & des pays étrangers, Paris : chez Jacques Lacombe, 1766, 2 volumes in octavo; Yverdon, 1766-1767, in octavo; Amsterdam : Arkstée et Merkus, 1767, 2 volumes in octavo
- with l'abbé Jaubert, Dictionnaire raisonné universel des Arts et Métiers, contenant leur description, et la police des manufactures de France et des pays étrangers, Paris : chez Pierre-François Didot jeune (1731-1795), 1773, 4 volumes in octavo; Lyon : A. Leroy, 1793-1801, 5 volumes in octavo; frequently republished (the first edition was produced by Macquer in 1766, but Jaubert's several additions meant that the work no longer appeared under Macquer's name)

== Sources ==
- (in French) Cardinal Georges Grente (ed.), Dictionnaire des lettres françaises. Le siecle XVIII, new edition edited and published under François Moureau, Paris, Fayard, 1995.
