= Chowringhee Theatre =

Historic theatre in West Bengal, India

The Private Subscription Theatre more commonly known as the Chowringhee Theatre, was an historic theatre in Calcutta (now named Kolkata) in India, founded in 1813 and closed in 1838.

== History ==
=== Foundation and activity ===
The Chowringhee Theatre was situated on Chowringhee Road. Several short-lived theatres had been founded in the city since the Calcutta Theatre, but the Chowringhee Theatre was to be its first successful successor.

The theatre was built on funds by private donations on subscriptions by shares of 100 Rs each. It was able to accommodate 300 people and was thereby the most spacious theatre in Calcutta at the time. Notably, "almost all the prominent actors and actresses of the time joined the theatre", among them being "Mr. Stocqueler, Mr. Parker, Mrs. Bland, Mr Francis. Mrs. Gottlieb, Mrs. Goodall, Mr. Atkinson, Mrs. Chester, Mrs Francis, Mrs Jones, William Linton, Henry Meredith Parker, Thomas Allosps" and foremost Esther Leach, who became one of the star attractions of the theatre, and D. L. Richardson became renowned as a director.

The theater was protected by the Governor-General and became one of the leading theatres in Calcutta and India. Reviews of the performances at the theatre were regularly published in the press, particularly the Calcutta Gazette and The Calcutta Journal. The theatre often staged Shakespeare: Macbeth was staged on 1 April 1814 with great success, followed by 'Henry V (1815), Coriolanus (18.1.1824), Macbeth (27.2.1824), Richard III (19.12.1828) and 'The Merchant of Venice (2.1.1829). The actors and the performances were generally given favorable reviews and came to be regarded for its high standards.

=== Impact ===
Chowringhee Theatre was the first English theatre more frequented also by Indians, and inspired the development of English style theatre among Indians. The Indian Bengali elites such as Prince Dwarakanath Tagore, Babu Prasanno Coomar Tagore, Raja Radhakanto Deb, Sri Kissen Singh and Kiehen Chandra Dutt acted as patrons and frequented the theatre, the Hindu Theatrical Association was founded by Prasanna Coomar Tagore in 1831, establishing the first native theatre, 'The Hindoo theatre', followed by Nabin Chandra Bose's theatre (1835), and the Indian aristocracy of Calcutta built English style theatres in their gardens, where they staged Sanskrit plays.

=== Closure ===
The theatre stimulated the foundation of two rivals, Dum Dum theatre (1817–1824) and the Boitaconnah Theatre (founded in 1824), but neither could stand the competition of the Chowringhee Theatre. By 1835, however, the theatre experienced severe financial difficulty and Prince Dwaraka Nath Tagore successfully suggested that it be sold. This, however, resulted in a drain of patrons and actors from the theatre.

The Chowringhee Theatre was destroyed by fire on 31 May 1838 and replaced the following year by the Sans Souci Theatre (1839–1849), founded by one of the Chowringhee Theatre's star actors Esther Leach.
