= Calcutta Theatre =

Historic theatre in Kolkata, India

The Calcutta Theatre or The New Playhouse, was a historic theatre in Calcutta (now named Kolkata) in India. It was founded in 1775 and active until 1808. It was the second theatre in the city of Calcutta, and its main venue for about thirty years. It was the leading theatre of Calcutta until the foundation of the Chowringhee Theatre in the early 19th-century.

== History ==
The first theatre in Calcutta, The Playhouse, was a modest local at the Lal Bazar, founded in 1753 and turned into an action house in 1756. It was eventually replaced by the Calcutta Theatre or "The New Playhouse", which was founded by the auctioneer George Williamson in 1775. It was situated near the Northern section of Clive Street and to the north of Writers Buildings, and built funded by the subscriptions sharers of one hundred rupees each. Among the share-holders was the governor, Richard Burwell.

Bernard Massinck (or Massing) was recommended to the post of manager of the theatre by David Garrick. The theatre staged English tragedy, comedy and farce in the English language by English actors. The theatre are recorded to have performed Hamlet (15.4*1784), The Merchant of Venice' 18.10.1784) 'Romeo and Juliet' (25*10.1784) and again 'Hamlet' on 18.11.1784.

The actors consisted of exclusively male amateurs, but they were reportedly given good training and was very well regarded in their ability, particularly a Captain Call from the garrison, who was dubbed the 'Garrick of the East' by Hicky's Bengal Gazette. No women, neither amateurs or professional actresses, acted upon the stage, as the Company directors was unwilling to hire actresses or allow women amateurs to perform, pointing to the scarcity of English women in Calcutta at the time and the concern that women on stage could attract to much attention: no actresses appeared in India until May 1789, on Emma Bistow's amateur theatre, and no professional actresses performed until the Chowringhee Theatre of 1813).

The value of the shares of the theatre was gradually reduced and the directors sold it to a private entrepreneur, who staged farces upon the stage, which was not as benefitted. In 1808, the debts led to the theatre being closed. The building and the adjoining site was acquired by Gopi Mohan Tagore, who turned it into the New China Bazar.
