= Charles-Jean-François Hénault =

French writer and historian (1685–1770)

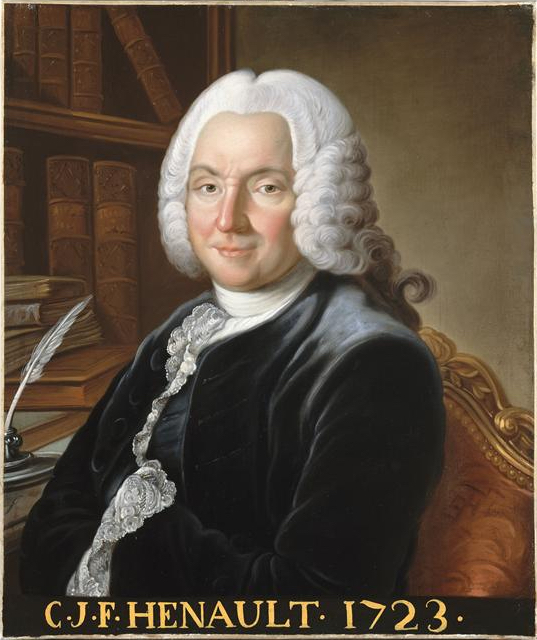
- Born: 8 February 1685; Paris, France
- Died: 24 November 1770 (aged 85); Paris, France
- Occupations: Writer and historian

Charles-Jean-François Hénault (French: [ʃaʁl ʒɑ̃ fʁɑ̃swa eno]; 8 February 1685 – 24 November 1770) was a French writer and historian.

== Life and career ==
=== Early years ===
Hénault was born in Paris. His father, René Jean Rémy Hénault de Cantobre (1648–1737) a farmer-general of taxes, Ferme générale, was a man of literary tastes, and young Hénault obtained a good education at the Jesuit college, Lycée Louis-le-Grand. His mother was Françoise de Ponthon (died 1738).

Captivated by the eloquence of Massillon, in his fifteenth year he entered the Oratory with the view of becoming a preacher but after two-years' residence he changed his intention, and, inheriting a position which secured him access to the most select society of Paris, he achieved distinction at an early period by his witty and graceful manners.

=== Career ===
Hénault's literary talent, manifested in the composition of various light poetical pieces, an opera, a tragedy (Cornélie, vestale, 1713), etc., obtained his entrance to the Academy (1723). Petit-maître as he was, he also had serious capacity, for he became councillor of the parlement of Paris (1705), and in 1710 he was chosen president of the chamber of inquiries (French: Chambre des Enquêtes). He also hosted the Club de l'Entresol (1724–1731) in his house on the Place Vendôme. After the death of the count de Rieux (son of the famous financier, Samuel Bernard) he became (in 1753) superintendent of the household of Queen Marie Leszczynska, whose intimate friendship he had previously enjoyed.

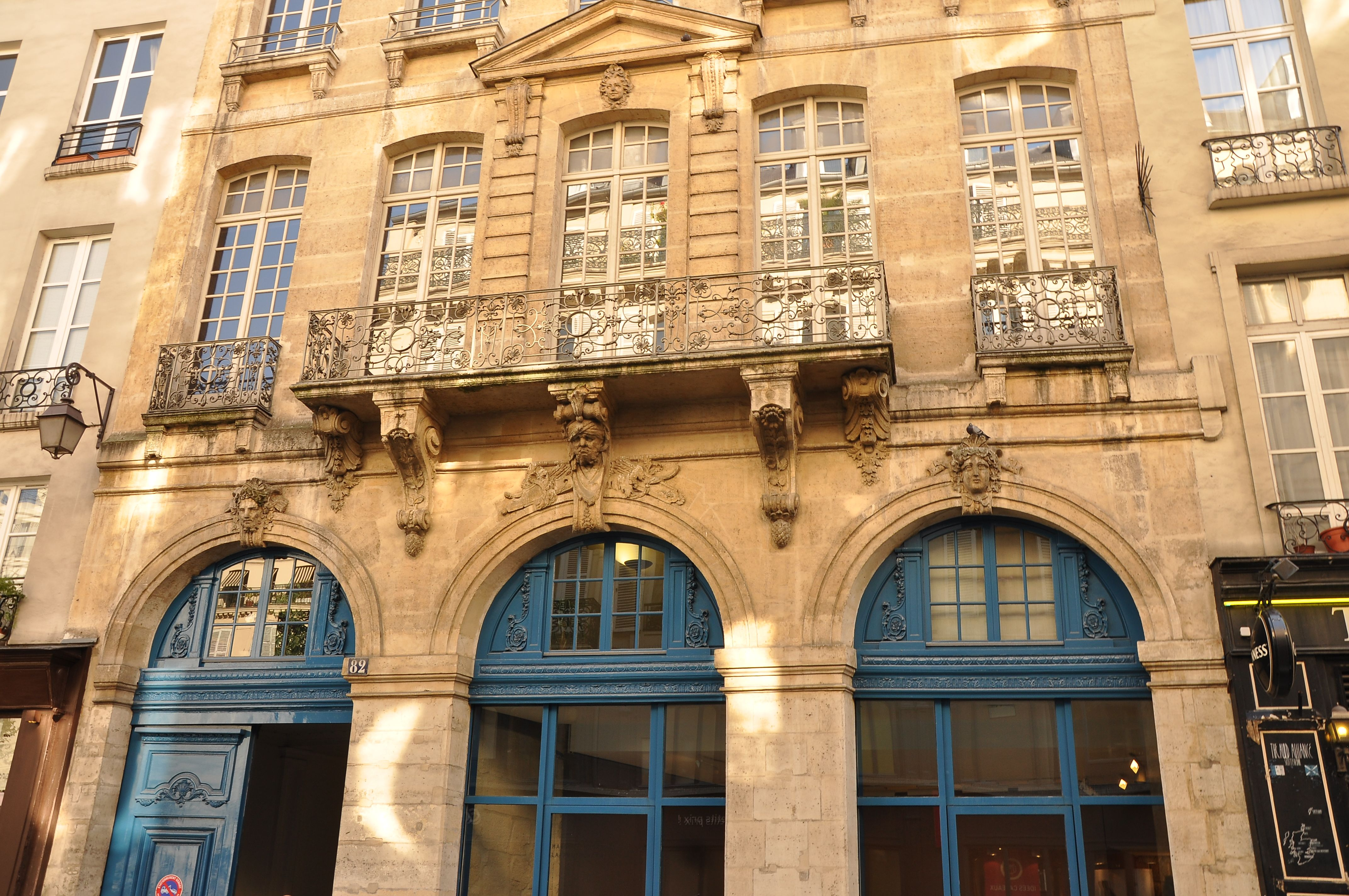
Entrance area of the N° 7 Place Vendôme (today Hôtel du Président Hénault de Cantorbe)

On Hénault's recovery in his eightieth year from a dangerous malady (1765), he professed to have undergone religious conversion and retired into private life, devoting the remainder of his days to study and devotion. His religion was, however, according to the marquis d'Argenson, exempt from fanaticism, persecution, bitterness and intrigue; and it did not prevent him from continuing his friendship with Voltaire, to whom it is said he had formerly rendered the service of saving the manuscript of La Henriade, when its author was about to commit it to the flames.

The literary work on which Hénault bestowed his chief attention was the Abrégé chronologique de l'histoire de France, first published in 1744 without the author's name. In the compass of two volumes he comprised the whole history of France from the earliest times to the death of Louis XIV. The work has no originality. Hénault had kept his note-books of the history lectures at the Jesuit college, of which the substance was taken from Mézeray and P Daniel. He revised them first in 1723, and later put them in the form of question and answer on the model of P le Ragois, and by following Dubos and Boulainvilliers and with the aid of the abbé Boudot he compiled his Abrégé.

The research is all on the surface and is only borrowed, but the work due to its success, was translated into several languages, even into Chinese. This was due partly to Hénault's popularity and position, partly to the agreeable style which made the history readable. He inserted, according to the fashion of the period, moral and political reflections, which are always brief. A few masterly strokes reproduced the leading features of each age and the characters of its illustrious men; accurate chronological tables set forth the most interesting events in the history of each sovereign and the names of the great men who flourished during his reign; and interspersed throughout the work are occasional chapters on the social and civil state of the country at the close of each era in its history. Continuations of the work have been made at separate periods by Fantin des Odoards, by Anguis with notes by Walckenaer, and by Michaud. He died at Paris on 24 November 1770.

Hénault's Mémoires have come down to us in two different versions, both of which are said to be authentic. One was published in 1855 by M. du Vigan; the other was owned by the Comte de Coutades, who permitted Lucien Perey to give long extracts in his work on Président Hénault (Paris, 1893). The memoirs are fragmentary and disconnected, but contain interesting anecdotes and details concerning persons of note. See the Correspondance of Grimm, of Madame de Deffand and of Voltaire; the notice by Walckenaer in the edition of the Abrégé; Sainte-Beuve, Causeries du lundi, vol. xi.; and the Origines de l'abrégé (Ann. Bulletin de la Société de l'histoire de France, 1901). Also H Lion, Le Président Hénault (Paris, 1903).
