= 1840s =

Decade

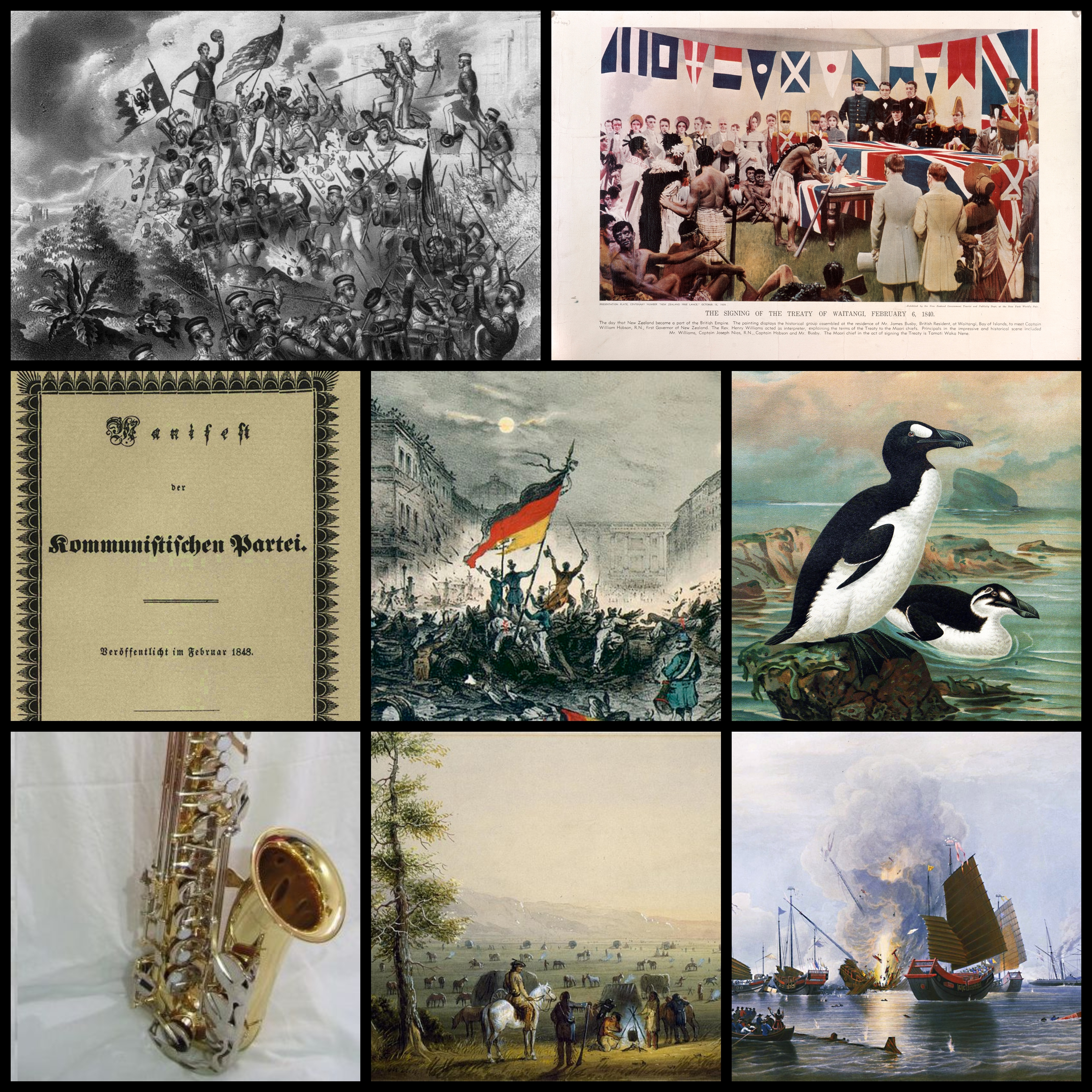
From top left, clockwise: The Mexican–American War ushers in the American expansion in its western frontier, paving way for new territories (and eventually states) such as Texas and California; the signing of the Treaty of Waitangi in 1840 guarantees continued Māori sovereignty but also leads to the proclamation of the nominal Colony of New Zealand; The great auk goes extinct, as it falls victim to overhunting; The First Opium War catalyzes Europe's imperial encroachment and control over Chinese ports, as the war resulted with Hong Kong's succession to Britain via the Treaty of Nanking; The Oregon Trail opens up to the world, prompting a wave of migration to the American west and later on, a gold rush in California that persisted through the 1850s; The saxophone is patented, later used in jazz, swing, and blues; First edition of the Communist Manifesto is published by Karl Marx in February 1848, and goes on to create a revolutionary shift in political ideologies and thought in the 20th century, influencing entire states such as Soviet Union, China, and Cuba; the Revolutions of 1848 ravages European politics, and causes multiple socio-cultural changes, particularly in classical music, arts, and politics.

The 1840s (pronounced "eighteen-forties") was the decade that began on January 1, 1840, and ended on December 31, 1849.

The decade was noted in Europe for featuring the largely unsuccessful revolutions of 1848, also known as the springtime of the peoples. Throughout the continent, bourgeois liberals and working-class radicals engaged in a series of revolts in favor of social reform. In the United Kingdom, this notably manifested itself through the Chartist movement, which sought universal suffrage and parliamentary reform. In France, the February Revolution led to the overthrow of the reigning House of Orléans by Louis-Napoleon Bonaparte. In 1848, the publication of the Communist Manifesto by Karl Marx would help lay the groundwork for the global socialist movement. Arguably the first major event of the decade was the signing of the Treaty of Waitangi in the United Tribes (modern-day New Zealand) between Māori rangatira and representatives of the British Crown, which began in February 1840. Due to the differences between the Māori and English versions of the texts, the British claimed Māori had ceded sovereignty and proclaimed a new Colony, leading to more than 25 years of asymmetric armed conflict until the Colony secured substantive control.

The Mexican–American War led to the redrawing of national boundaries in North America. In the United States, mass migration to the new West Coast occurred, following the annexation of California from Mexico with the Treaty of Guadalupe Hidalgo, and the California Gold Rush beginning, following the discovery of gold there, both in early 1848. On its northern border, the United States settled the Oregon boundary dispute with the United Kingdom in 1846, thereby solving a domestic political crisis in the former nation. Meanwhile in Ireland, the Great Famine began in 1845, causing the deaths of one million Irish people and forcing over a million more to emigrate. In 1848, the women's rights movement began with the Seneca Falls Convention in New York.

The last living person from this decade was Robert Early, who died in 1960.

== Politics and wars ==
=== Pacific Islands ===
In 1842, Tahiti and Tahuata were declared a French protectorate, to allow Catholic missionaries to work undisturbed. The capital of Papeetē was founded in 1843. In 1845, George Tupou I united Tonga into a kingdom, and reigned as Tuʻi Kanokupolu.

=== Africa ===
- December 7, 1840 – David Livingstone leaves Britain for Africa.
- August 10, 1845 – The French Consul in Zanzibar (M. Broquant) receives the final letter sent by Eugène Maizan during his expedition into tropical Africa.
- December 20, 1848 – Slavery is abolished on the island of Réunion.

==== Algeria ====
- December 21, 1847 – Abd al-Kader surrenders and is imprisoned by the French.

==== Ethiopia ====
- February 7, 1842 – Battle of Debre Tabor: Ras Ali Alula, Regent of the Emperor of Ethiopia, defeats warlord Wube Haile Maryam of Semien.

==== South Africa ====
- June 4, 1842 – In South Africa, hunter Dick King rides into a British military base in Grahamstown to warn that the Boers have besieged Durban (he had left 11 days earlier). The British army dispatches a relief force.
- December 13, 1843 – Basutoland becomes a British protectorate.

==== Morocco ====
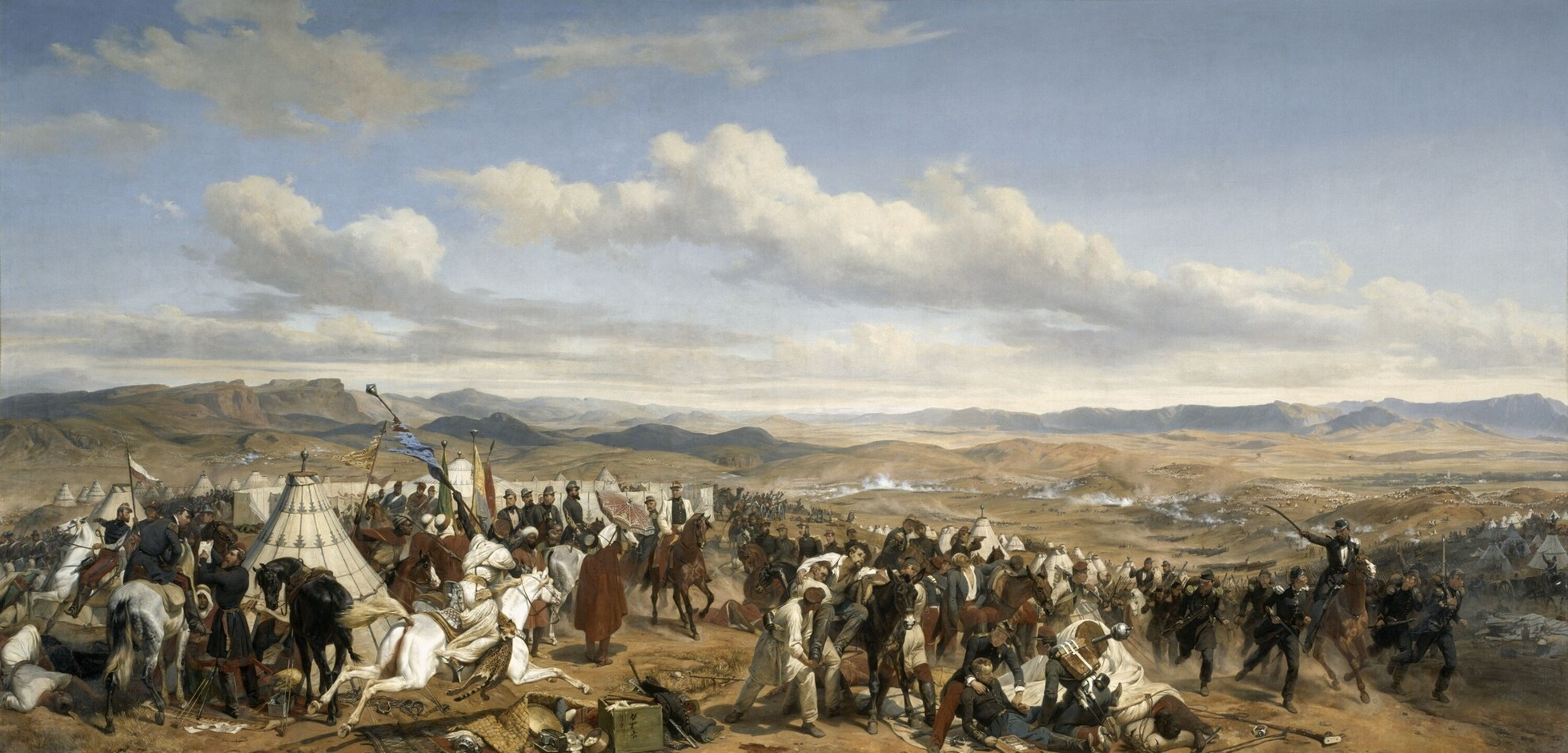
Battle of Isly during the Franco-Moroccan War

- August 14, 1844 – Abdelkader El Djezairi is defeated at Isly in Morocco; the sultan of Morocco soon repudiates his ally.

==== Liberia ====
- July 26, 1847 – Liberia gains independence.
- January 3, 1848 – Joseph Jenkins Roberts is sworn in as the first president of the independent African Republic of Liberia.

=== East Asia ===
==== China ====
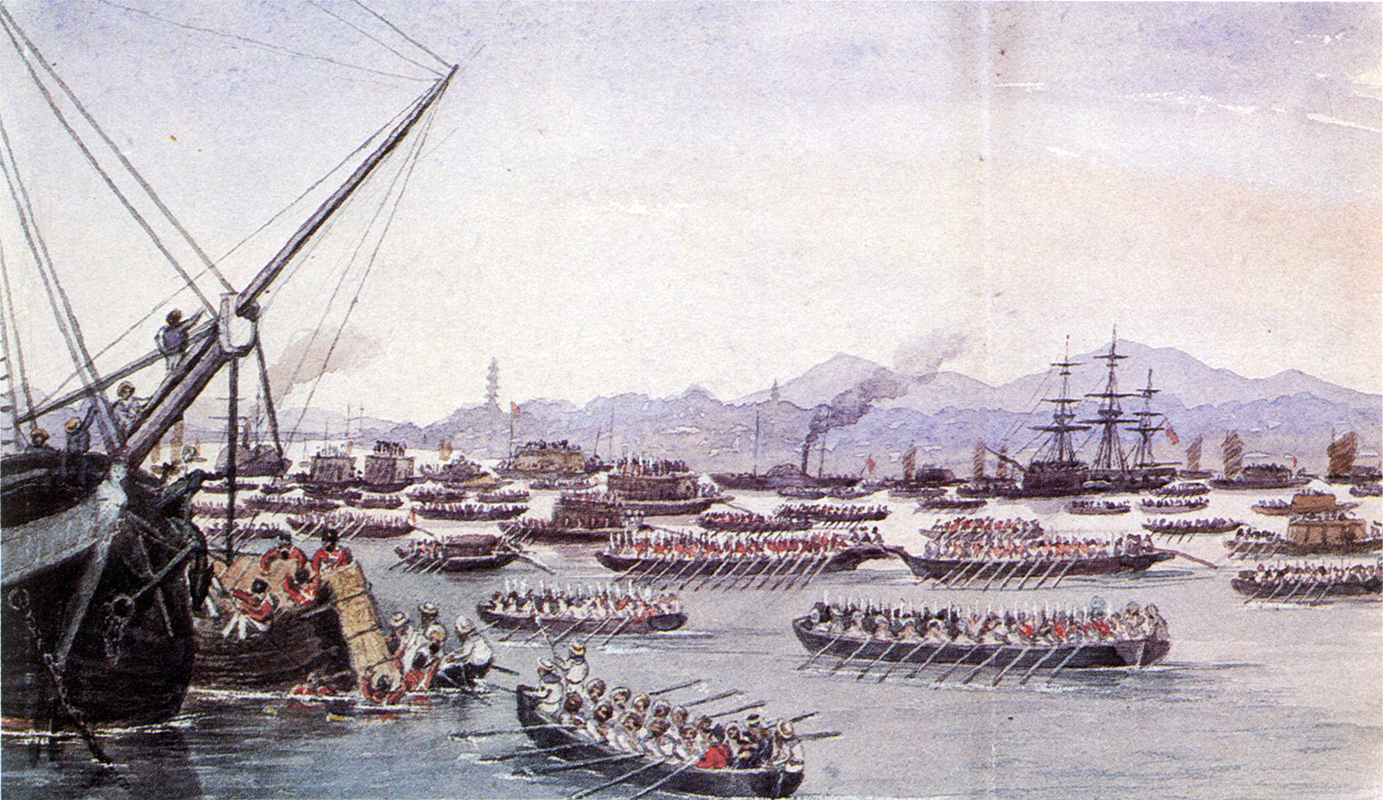
First Opium War: British ships approaching Canton in May 1841

On August 29, 1842, the first of two Opium Wars ended between China and Britain with the Treaty of Nanking, signed by Keying and Yilibu on behalf of the Daoguang Emperor, and Henry Pottinger on behalf of Queen Victoria. The treaty was based on the 1841 Convention of Chuenpi signed by Qishan and Charles Elliot. One of the consequences was the cession of modern-day Hong Kong Island to the British. Hong Kong would eventually be returned to China in 1997.

On July 3, 1844 the United States signed the Treaty of Wanghia with the Qing Empire. The treaty established five U.S. treaty ports in China with extraterritoriality and was the first unequal treaty that the United States imposed on the dynasty.

==== Japan ====
The 1840s comprised the end of the Tenpō era (1830–1844), the entirety of the Kōka era (1844–1848), and the beginning of the Kaei era (1848–1854). The decade saw the end of the reign of Emperor Ninko in 1846, who was succeeded by his son, Emperor Kōmei.

=== Southeastern Asia ===
==== Siam and Vietnam ====
The Siamese-Vietnamese War (1841–1845) in Cambodia erupted between Vietnam (then under the rule of the Nguyễn dynasty) and Siam (under the House of Chakri). In the increasingly confrontational rivalry between Vietnam and Siam, the conflict was triggered by Vietnam's absorption of Cambodia and the demotion of the Khmer monarchs. Siam under Rama III seized the opportunity to intervene as the tide of Khmer discontent rose against Vietnamese rule.

Emperors Minh Mạng, Thiệu Trị and Tự Đức ruled Vietnam during the 1840s under the Nguyễn dynasty.

==== New Guinea ====
- 1848 – British, Dutch, and German governments lay claim to New Guinea.

=== Australia and New Zealand ===
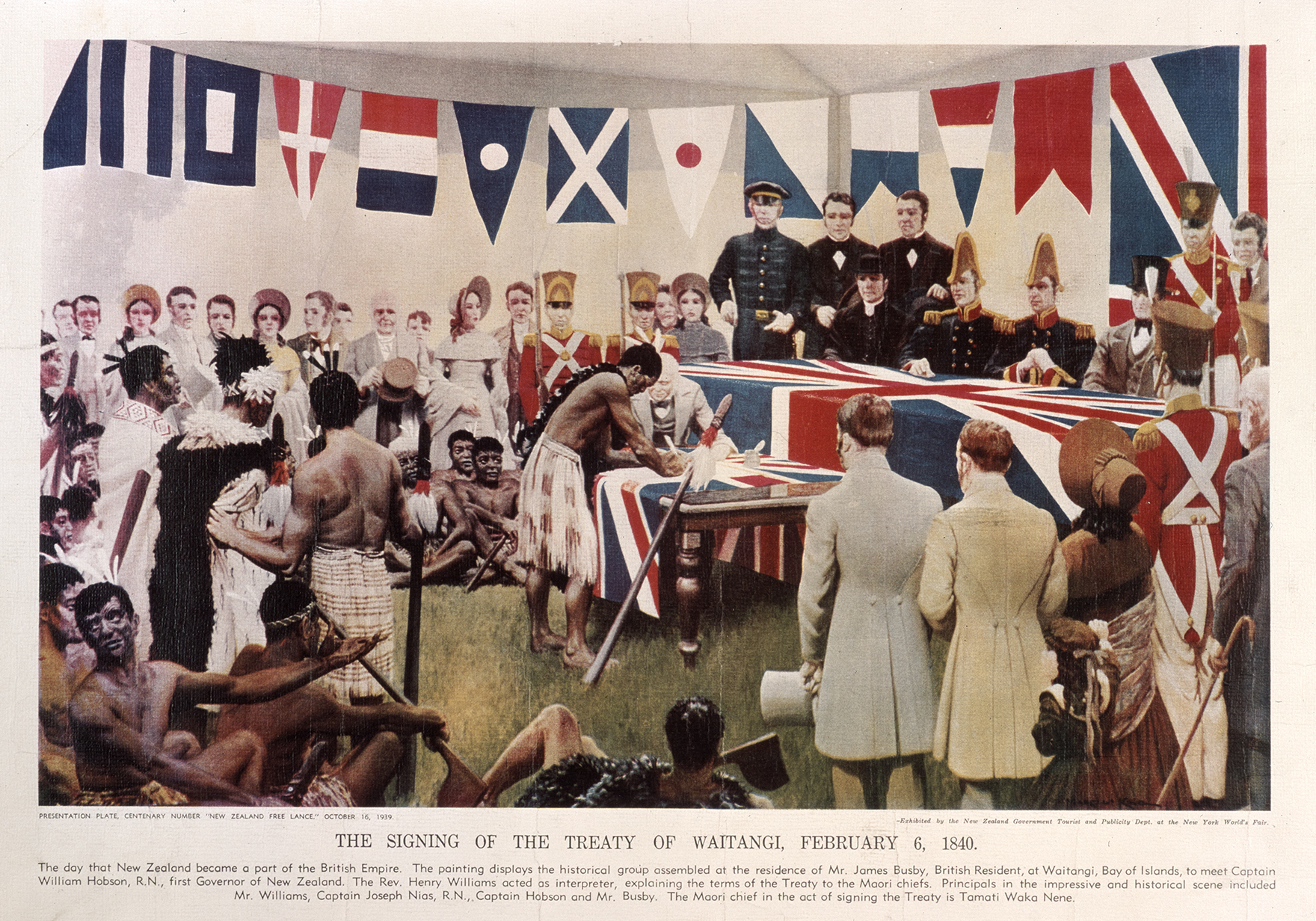
Depiction of the signing of the Treaty of Waitangi in 1840

- First signing of the Treaty of Waitangi on 6 February 1840, at Waitangi, United Tribes of New Zealand (modern-day Northland Region, New Zealand), between Māori rangatira (chiefs and rulers) and representatives of the British Crown. The treaty between is considered the founding point of modern New Zealand. There were substantial differences between the Māori and English versions of the text, with the vast majority of rangatira signing the Māori version. Perhaps the most prominent was that the Māori version (Te Tiriti o Waitangi) gave Queen Victoria 'kāwanatanga', a transliteration of the English word 'governorship', whereas the British version said Māori who signed the Treaty were ceding sovereignty. Other notable differences included a right of pre-emption clause in the English version, but not in the Māori version. In the Māori version of the Treaty, the use of the words 'kawanatanga' and 'tino rangatiratanga' (meaning 'absolute sovereignty') contributed to later differences of view between the Crown and Māori over how much authority rangatira would retain. The British subsequently declared they had sovereignty over the islands in May, and later proclaimed the Colony of New Zealand in 1841, despite Māori retaining de facto substantive sovereignty. This would lead to the New Zealand Wars between Māori and the British.
- July 20, 1845 – Charles Sturt enters the Simpson Desert in central Australia.
- May 25, 1846 – The Royal Geographical Society awards Paweł Edmund Strzelecki a Founder's Medal "for exploration in the south eastern portion of Australia".
- June 15, 1846 – Launceston Church Grammar School opens for the first time in Tasmania.

=== Southern Asia ===
==== Afghanistan ====
The First Anglo-Afghan War had started in 1838, started by the British as a means of defending India (under British control at the time) from the Russian Empire's expansion into Central Asia. The British attempted to impose a puppet regime on Afghanistan under Shuja Shah, but the regime was short lived and proved unsustainable without British military support. By 1842, mobs were attacking the British on the streets of Kabul and the British garrison was forced to abandon the city due to constant civilian attacks. During the retreat from Kabul, the British army of approximately 4,500 troops (of which only 690 were European) and 12,000 camp followers was subjected to a series of attacks by Afghan warriors. All of the British soldiers were killed except for one and he and a few surviving Indian soldiers made it to the fort at Jalalabad shortly after. After the Battle of Kabul (1842), Britain placed Dost Mohammad Khan back into power (1842–1863) and withdrew from Afghanistan.

==== India ====
Map of India in 1848

- March 24, 1843 – Battle of Hyderabad: The Bombay Army led by Major General Sir Charles Napier defeats the Talpur Emirs, securing Sindh as a Province of British India.

==== Sikh Empire ====
The Sikh Empire was founded in 1799, ruled by Ranjit Singh. When Singh died in 1839, the Sikh Empire began to fall into disorder. There was a succession of short-lived rulers at the central Durbar (court), and increasing tension between the Khalsa (the Sikh Army) and the Durbar. In May 1841, the Dogra dynasty (a vassal of the Sikh Empire) invaded western Tibet, marking the beginning of the Sino-Sikh war. This war ended in a stalemate in September 1842, with the Treaty of Chushul.

The British East India Company began to build up its military strength on the borders of the Punjab. Eventually, the increasing tension goaded the Khalsa to invade British territory, under weak and possibly treacherous leaders. The hard-fought First Anglo-Sikh War (1845–1846) ended in defeat for the Khalsa. With the Treaty of Lahore, the Sikh Empire ceded Kashmir to the East India Company and surrendered the Koh-i-Noor diamond to Queen Victoria.

The Sikh empire was finally dissolved at the end of the Second Anglo-Sikh War in 1849 into separate princely states and the British province of Punjab. Eventually, a Lieutenant Governorship was formed in Lahore as a direct representative of the British Crown.

==== Sri Lanka ====
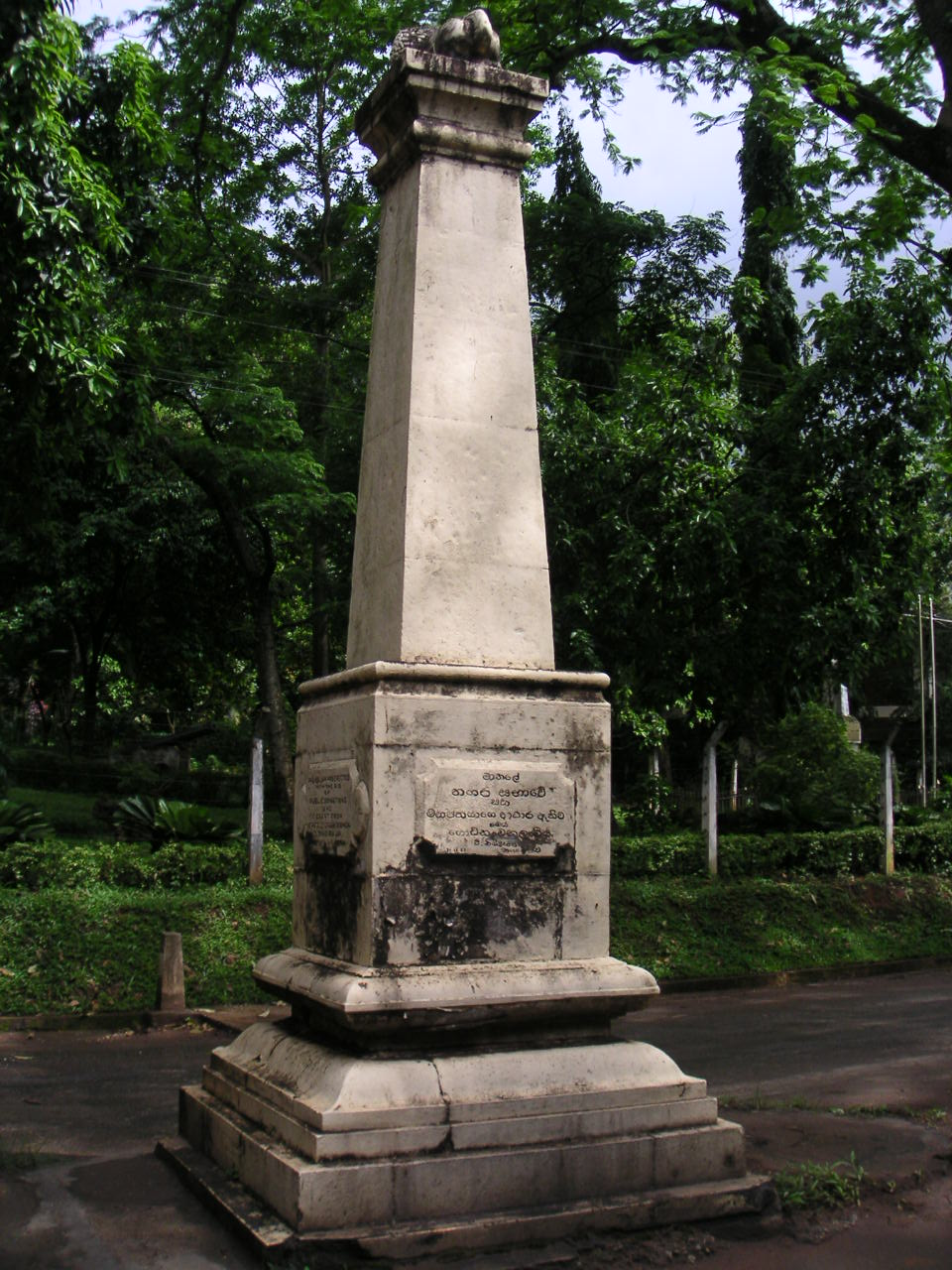
A memorial of Matale Rebellion, which began in Sri Lanka in 1848

- July 26, 1848 – Matale Rebellion against British rule in Sri Lanka.

=== Western Asia ===
==== Ottoman Empire ====
The decade was near the beginning of the Tanzimât Era of the Ottoman Empire. Sultan Abdülmecid I ruled during this period.

===== Lebanon =====
Emir Bashir Shihab II controlled the Mount Lebanon Emirate at the beginning of the 1840s. Bashir allied with Muhammad Ali of Egypt, but Muhammad Ali was driven out of the country. Bashir was deposed in 1840 when the Egyptians were driven out by an Ottoman-European alliance, which had the backing of Maronite forces. His successor, Emir Bashir III, ruled until 1842, after which the emirate was dissolved and split into a Druze sector and a Christian sector.

===== Romania =====
- June 21, 1848 – Wallachian Revolution of 1848: The Proclamation of Islaz is made public and a Romanian revolutionary government led by Ion Heliade Rădulescu and Christian Tell is created.

==== Persian Empire (Iran) ====
- 1844–1852 – The Babi Movement
- 1848 – Mirza Taqi Khan Amir Kabir as chief minister (until 1851)
- 1847 – The Ottoman Empire cedes Abadan Island to the Persian Empire

== Europe and the Americas ==
=== Revolutions of 1848 ===
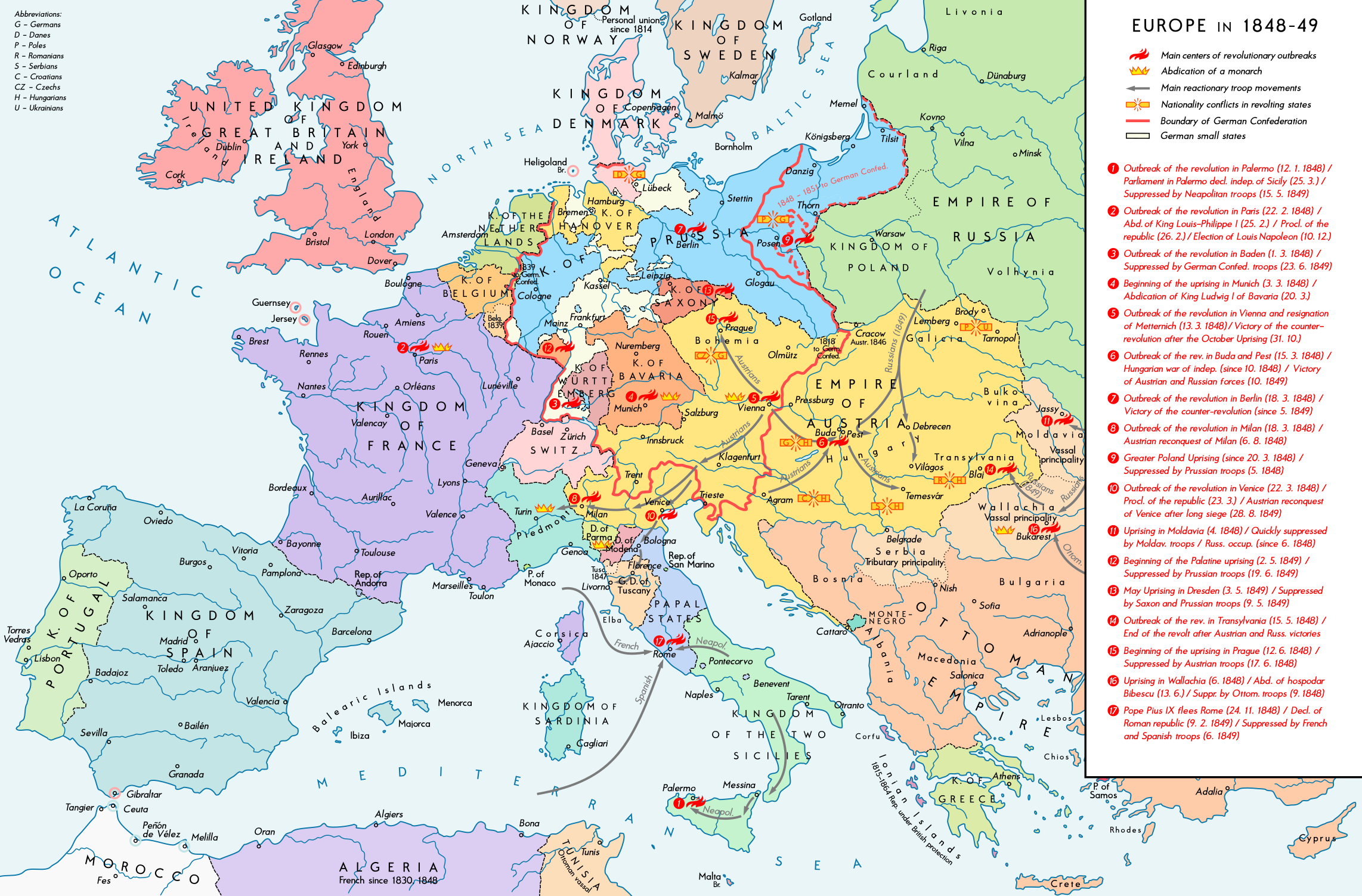
Map of Europe in 1848–1849 depicting the main revolutionary centers

There was a wave of revolutions in Europe, collectively known as the Revolutions of 1848. It remains the most widespread revolutionary wave in European history, but within a year, reactionary forces had regained control, and the revolutions collapsed.

The revolutions were essentially bourgeois-democratic in nature with the aim of removing the old feudal structures and the creation of independent national states. The revolutionary wave began in France in February, and immediately spread to most of Europe and parts of Latin America. Over 50 countries were affected, but with no coordination or cooperation among the revolutionaries in different countries. Six factors were involved: widespread dissatisfaction with political leadership; demands for more participation in government and democracy; demands for freedom of press; the demands of the working classes; the upsurge of nationalism; and finally, the regrouping of the reactionary forces based on the royalty, the aristocracy, the army, and the peasants.

The uprisings were led by ad hoc coalitions of reformers, the middle classes and workers, which did not hold together for long. Tens of thousands of people were killed, and many more forced into exile. The only significant lasting reforms were the abolition of serfdom in Austria and Hungary, the end of absolute monarchy in Denmark, and the definitive end of the Capetian monarchy in France. The revolutions were most important in France, the Netherlands, Germany, Poland, Italy, and the Austrian Empire, but did not reach Russia, Sweden, Great Britain, and most of southern Europe (Spain, Serbia, Greece, Montenegro, Portugal, the Ottoman Empire).

=== Eastern Europe ===
==== Russia ====
- May 22, 1841 – The Georgian province of Guria revolts against the Russian Empire.
- 1848 – Admiral Nevelskoi explores the Strait of Tartary.
- November 16, 1849 – A Russian court sentences Fyodor Dostoevsky to death for anti-government activities linked to a radical intellectual group, the Petrashevsky Circle. Facing a firing squad on December 23 the group members are reprieved at the last moment and exiled to the katorga prison camps in Siberia.

==== Austrian Empire ====
- June 2 – 12, 1848 – Prague Slavic Congress brings together members of the Pan-Slavism movement.

===== Hungary =====
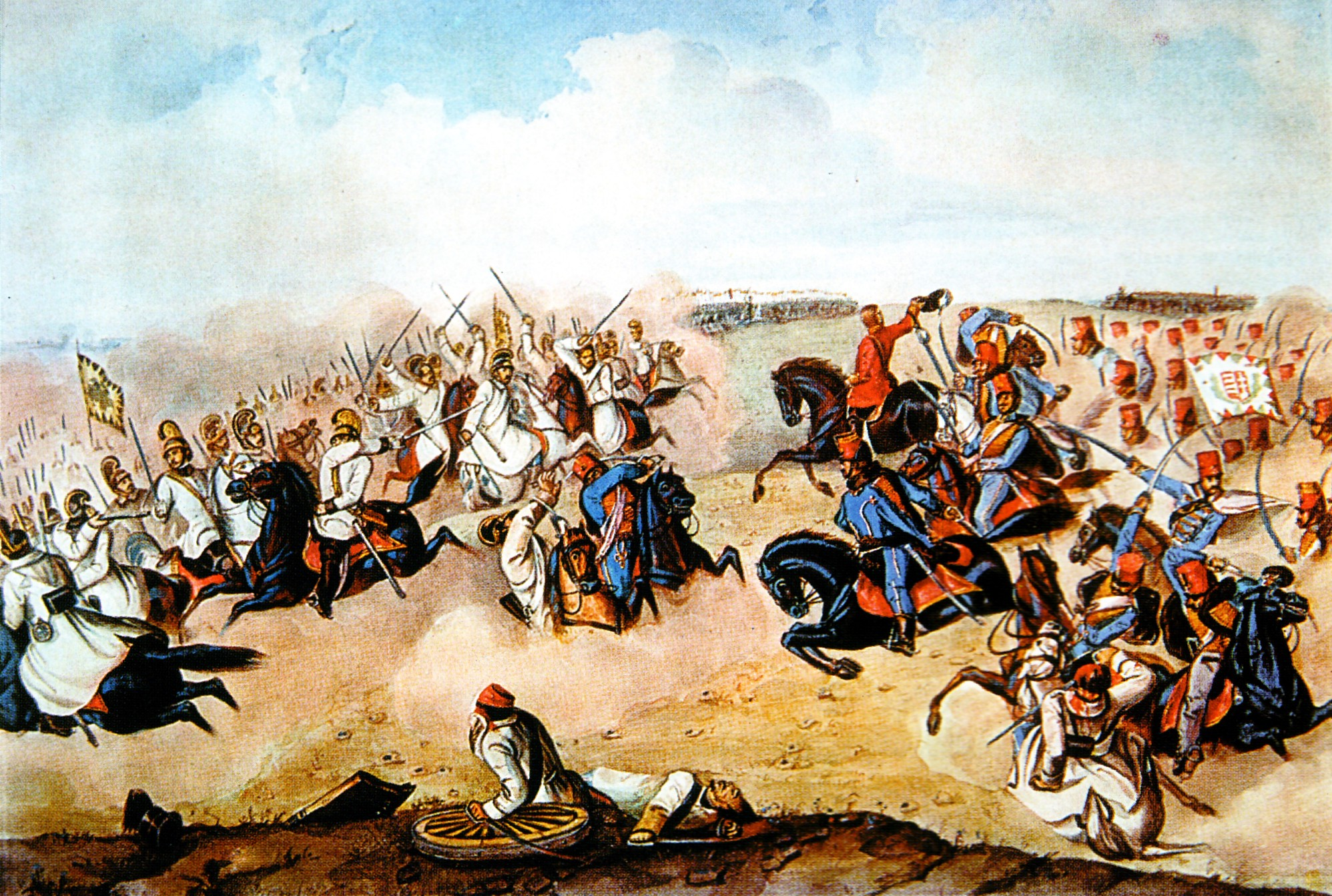
Hungarian hussars in battle during the Hungarian Revolution

- March 15, 1848 – Start of the Hungarian Revolution of 1848.
- May 15, 1848 – 40,000 Romanians meet at the Blaj to protest Transylvania becoming a part of Hungary.
- October 6, 1849 – The 13 Martyrs of Arad are executed after the Hungarian War of Independence.

===== Galicia =====
- February 18, 1846 – Beginning of the Galician peasant revolt.

=== Northern Europe ===
==== Sweden ====
- 1842 – Compulsory elementary education introduced.
- March 8, 1844 – King Oscar I ascends to the throne of Sweden-Norway upon the death of his father Charles XVI/III John.

==== Denmark ====
- 1843 – The Danish government re-establishes the Althing in Iceland as an advisory body.
- March 24, 1848 – Start of the First Schleswig War (German: Schleswig-Holsteinischer Krieg or Three Years' War (Danish: Treårskrigen)). The First Schleswig War was the first round of military conflict in southern Denmark and northern Germany rooted in the Schleswig-Holstein Question, contesting the issue of who should control the Duchies of Schleswig and Holstein. The war, which lasted from 1848 to 1851, also involved troops from Prussia and Sweden. Ultimately, the war resulted in a Danish victory. A second conflict, the Second Schleswig War, erupted in 1864.
- June 5, 1849 – Denmark becomes a constitutional monarchy.

==== United Kingdom ====
- September 16, 1840 – Joseph Strutt hands over the deeds and papers concerning the Derby Arboretum, which is to become England's first public park.
- August 10, 1842 – The Mines Act 1842 becomes law, prohibiting underground work for all women and boys under 10 years old in England.
- March 25, 1843 – Marc Isambard Brunel's Thames Tunnel, the first tunnel under the River Thames and the world's first bored underwater tunnel, is opened in London.
- May 4, 1843 – Natal is proclaimed a British colony.
- April – The Fleet Prison for debtors in London is closed.

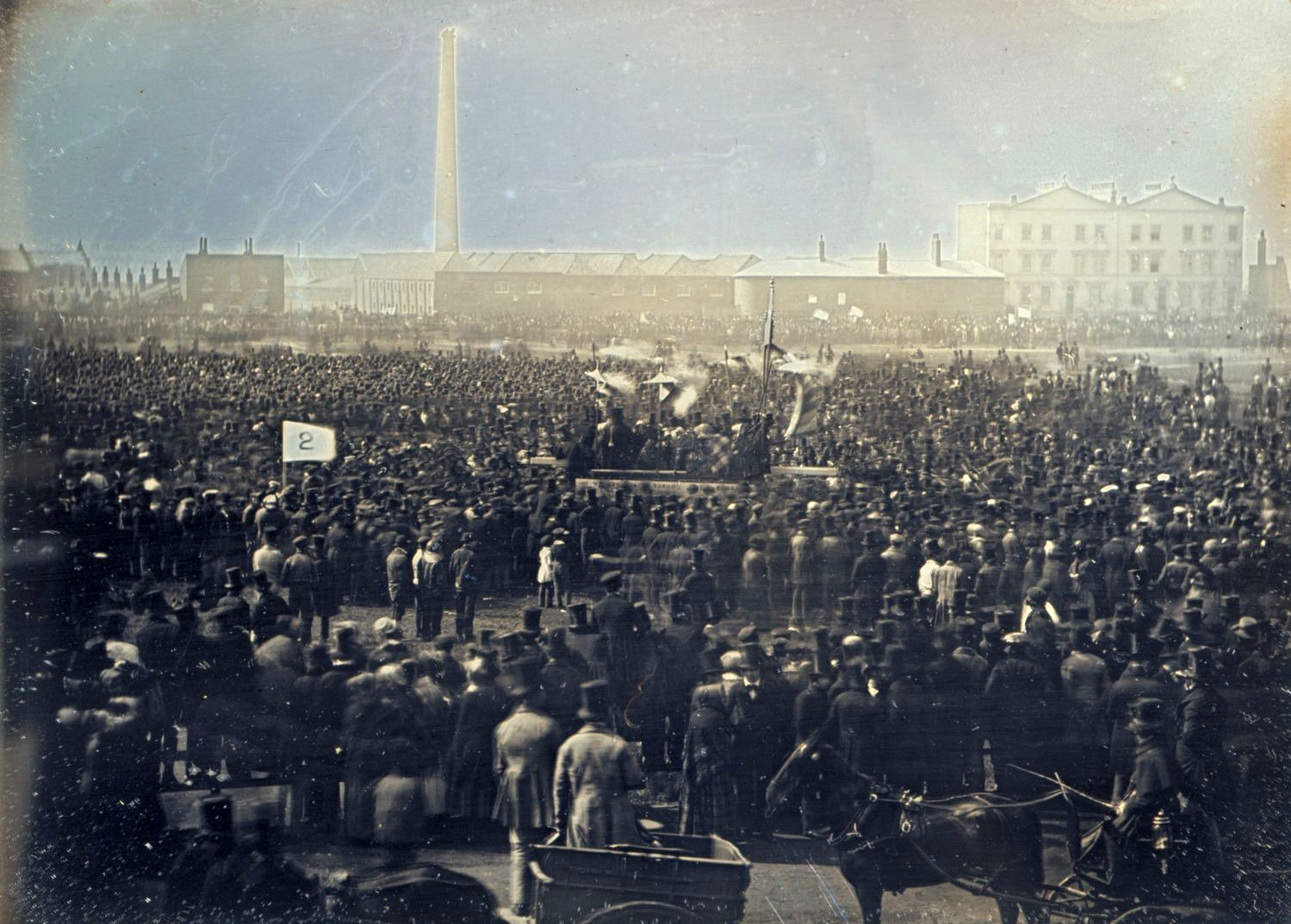
April 10: "Monster Rally" of Chartists held on Kennington Common in London; the first photograph of a crowd depicts it.

- July, 1848 – Public Health Act establishes Boards of Health across England and Wales, the nation's first public health law, giving cities broad authority to build modern sanitary systems.

===== Royalty =====
Queen Victoria was on the throne 20 June 1837 until her death 22 January, 1901. The wedding of Queen Victoria and Prince Albert of Saxe-Coburg and Gotha took place in 1840.

===== Ireland =====
The Great Famine of the 1840s caused the deaths of one million Irish people and over a million more emigrated to escape it. It is sometimes referred to, mostly outside Ireland, as the "Irish Potato Famine" because one-third of the population was then solely reliant on this cheap crop for a number of historical reasons. The proximate cause of famine was a potato disease commonly known as potato blight. A census taken in 1841 revealed a population of slightly over 8 million. A census immediately after the famine in 1851 counted 6,552,385, a drop of almost 1.5 million in 10 years.

The period of the potato blight in Ireland from 1845 to 1851 was full of political confrontation. A more radical Young Ireland group seceded from the Repeal movement and attempted an armed rebellion in the Young Irelander Rebellion of 1848, which was unsuccessful.

=== Western Europe ===
==== Germany ====
- May 18, 1848 – The first German National Assembly (Nationalversammlung) opens in Frankfurt, Germany.
- March – The Frankfurt Parliament completes its drafting of a liberal constitution and elects Frederick William IV emperor of the new German national state.
- April 2, 1849 – Revolutions of 1848 in the German states end in failure.
- May 3, 1849 – The May Uprising in Dresden, last of the Revolutions of 1848 in the German states, begins.

==== Switzerland ====
- November 3 – 29, 1847 – Sonderbund War, a civil war in Switzerland in which General Guillaume-Henri Dufour's federal army defeats the Sonderbund (an alliance of seven Catholic cantons) with a total of only 86 deaths.

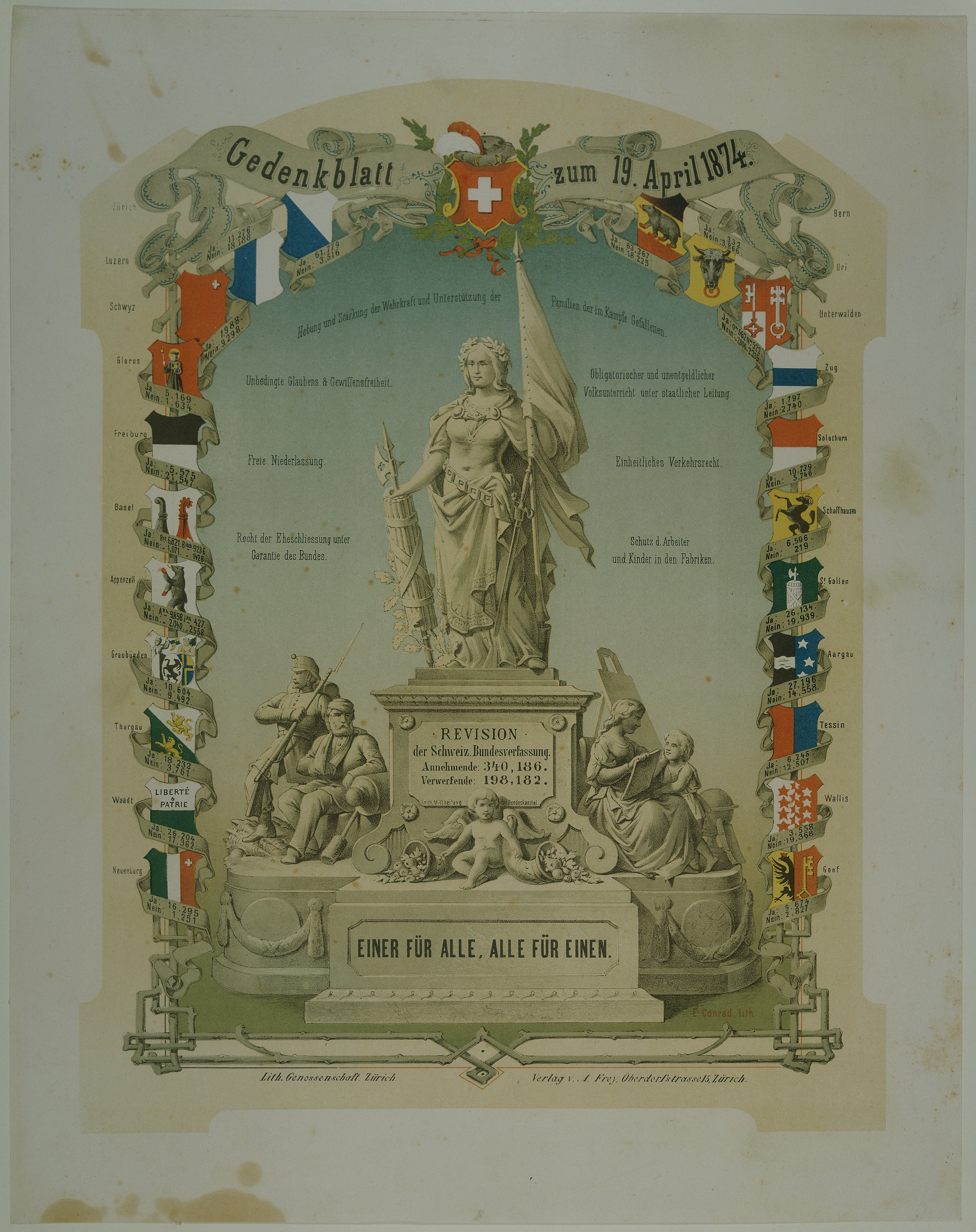
September 12: The Swiss Confederation reconstitutes itself as a federal republic.

- September 12, 1848 – One of the successes of the Revolutions of 1848, the Swiss Federal Constitution, patterned on the US Constitution, enters into force, creating a federal republic and one of the first modern democratic states in Europe.

==== The Netherlands ====
- October 7, 1840 – Willem II becomes King of the Netherlands.
- November 3, 1848 – A greatly revised Dutch constitution is proclaimed.

==== France ====
- March 1, 1840 – Adolphe Thiers becomes prime minister of France.
- September 30, 1840 – The frigate Belle Poule arrives in Cherbourg, bringing back the remains of Napoleon from Saint Helena to France. He is buried in the Invalides.

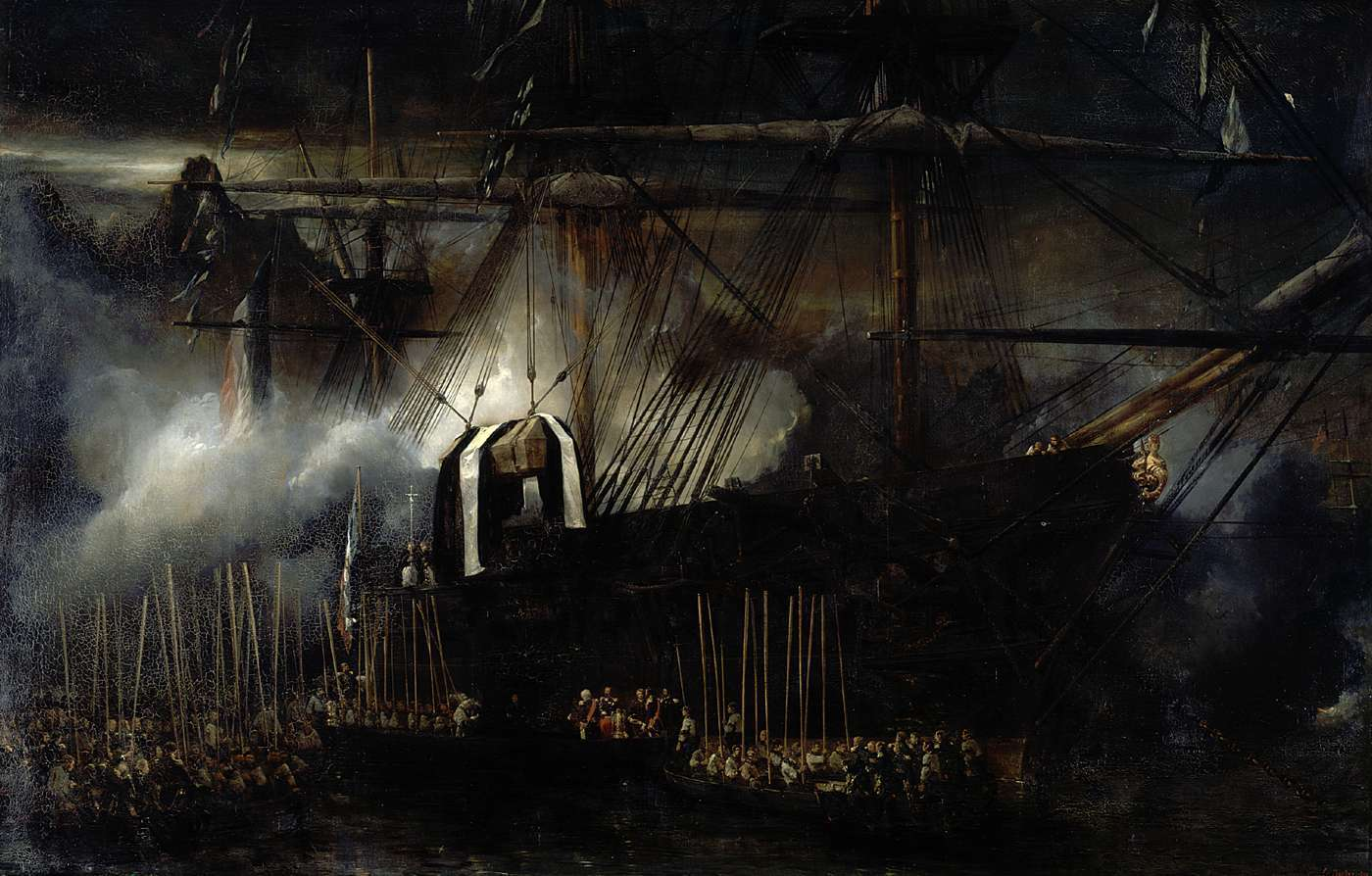
The frigate Belle Poule brings back the remains of Napoleon to France.

- December 15, 1840 – The corpse of Napoleon is placed in the Hotel des Invalides in Paris.
- February 23, 1848 – François Guizot, Prime Minister of France, resigns. 52 people from the Paris mob are killed by soldiers guarding public buildings.
- February 24, 1848 – Louis Philippe, King of the French, abdicates in favour of his grandson, Philippe, comte de Paris, and flees to England after days of revolution in Paris. The French Second Republic is later proclaimed by Alphonse de Lamartine in the name of the provisional government elected by the Chamber under the pressure of the mob.
- May 15, 1848 – Radicals invade the French Chamber of Deputies.
- June 22, 1848 – The French government dissolves the national workshops in Paris, giving the workers the choice of joining the army or going to workshops in the provinces.
- August 28, 1848 – Mathieu Luis becomes the first black member to join the French Parliament as a representative of Guadeloupe.
- November 4, 1848 – France ratifies a new constitution. The Second Republic of France is set up, ending the state of temporary government lasting since the Revolution of 1848.
- December 10, 1848 – Prince Louis-Napoleon Bonaparte is elected first president of the French Second Republic.
- December 20, 1848 – President Bonaparte takes his Oath of Office in front of the French National Assembly.
- January 1, 1849 – France issues Ceres, the nation's first postage stamp.

=== Southern Europe ===
==== Greece ====
- September 3, 1843 – Popular uprising in Athens, Greece, including citizens and military captains, to require from King Otto the issue of a liberal Constitution to the state, which has been governed since independence (1830) by various domestic and foreign business interests.

==== Italian Peninsula ====
- January 12, 1848 – The Palermo rising erupts in Sicily, against the Bourbon kingdom of the Two Sicilies.
- March 22, 1848 – Republic of San Marco comes into existence in Venice.
- January 21, 1849 – General elections are held in the Papal States.
- February 8, 1849 – The new Roman Republic is proclaimed.
- April 27, 1849 – Giuseppe Garibaldi enters Rome to defend it from the French troops of General Oudinot.
- May 15, 1849 – Troops of the Two Sicilies take Palermo and overthrow the republican government of Sicily.
- July 3, 1849 – French troops occupy Rome; the Roman Republic surrenders.

==== Spain ====
This period saw the 1840 end of the First Carlist War, a civil war in Spain over the succession to the throne and the nature of the Spanish monarchy. This was the first full decade of the reign of Isabella II of Spain. Since she was only 10 years old in 1840, her true reign started in 1843, for which the first portion was referred to as Década moderada. The Affair of the Spanish Marriages (1846) was a series of intrigues between France, Spain, and the United Kingdom relating Isabella II's marriages, which was shortly followed by Second Carlist War (1847–1849).

==== Portugal ====
- May 16, 1846 – Revolutionary insurrection in Portugal (defeated by royalist troops on February 22, 1847)

=== North America ===
==== Canada ====
In the prior decade, the desire for responsible government resulted in the abortive Rebellions of 1837–1838. The Durham Report subsequently recommended responsible government and the assimilation of French Canadians into English culture. The Act of Union 1840 merged the Canadas into a united Province of Canada and responsible government was established for all British North American provinces by 1849. The signing of the Oregon Treaty by Britain and the United States in 1846 ended the Oregon boundary dispute, extending the border westward along the 49th parallel. This paved the way for British colonies on Vancouver Island (1849) and in British Columbia (1858).

- March 11, 1848 – Louis-Hippolyte Lafontaine and Robert Baldwin became the first Joint Premiers of the Province of Canada to be democratically elected under a system of responsible government.
- April 25, 1849 – James Bruce, 8th Earl of Elgin, the Governor General of Canada, signs the Rebellion Losses Bill, causing unrest among Montreal's English population and triggering the Montreal Riots.

==== United States ====
- January 18, 1840 – The Electro-Magnetic and Mechanics Intelligencer used electricity for power of the press to print it.
- February 18, 1841 – The first ongoing filibuster in the United States Senate begins and lasts until March 11.
- August 16, 1841 – U.S. President John Tyler vetoes a bill which called for the re-establishment of the Second Bank of the United States. Enraged Whig Party members riot outside the White House in the most violent demonstration on White House grounds in U.S. history.
- March – Commonwealth v. Hunt: the Massachusetts Supreme Court makes strikes and unions legal in the United States.
- May 19, 1842 – Dorr Rebellion: Militiamen supporting Thomas Wilson Dorr attack the arsenal in Providence, Rhode Island, but are repulsed.
- January 23, 1845 – The United States Congress establishes a uniform date for federal elections, which will henceforth be held on the first Tuesday after the first Monday in November.
- March 4, 1845 – The United States Congress passes legislation overriding a presidential veto for the first time.
- February 26, 1846 – The Liberty Bell is cracked while being rung for George Washington's birthday.
- March 1, 1847 – The state of Michigan formally abolishes the death penalty.
- March 4, 1847 – The 30th United States Congress is sworn into office.

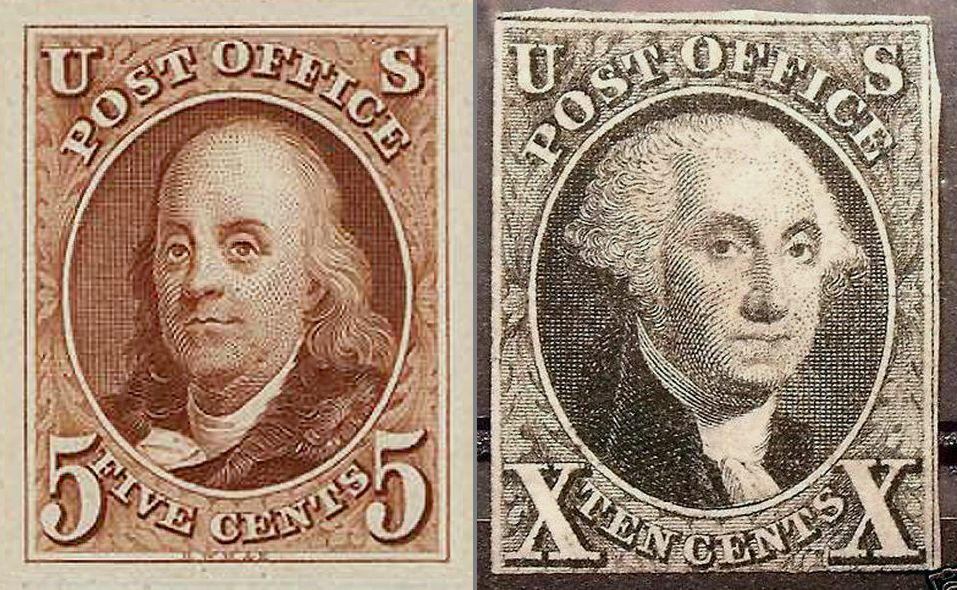
The first U.S. postage stamps have portraits of Benjamin Franklin and George Washington. Though highly collectable, they are far from being the most valuable.

- July 1, 1847 – The United States issues its first postage stamps (pictured).
- January 31, 1848 – Construction of the Washington Monument begins in Washington, D.C.
- March 3, 1849 – The United States Congress passes the Gold Coinage Act allowing the minting of gold coins.

===== Slavery =====
- March 9, 1841 – Amistad: The Supreme Court of the United States rules in the case that the Africans who seized control of the ship had been taken into slavery illegally.
- August 11 (Wednesday) Frederick Douglass spoke in front of the Anti-Slavery Convention in Nantucket, Massachusetts.
- May – Frederick Douglass's Narrative of the Life of Frederick Douglass, an American Slave written by himself is published by the Boston Anti-Slavery Society.

===== Settlement =====
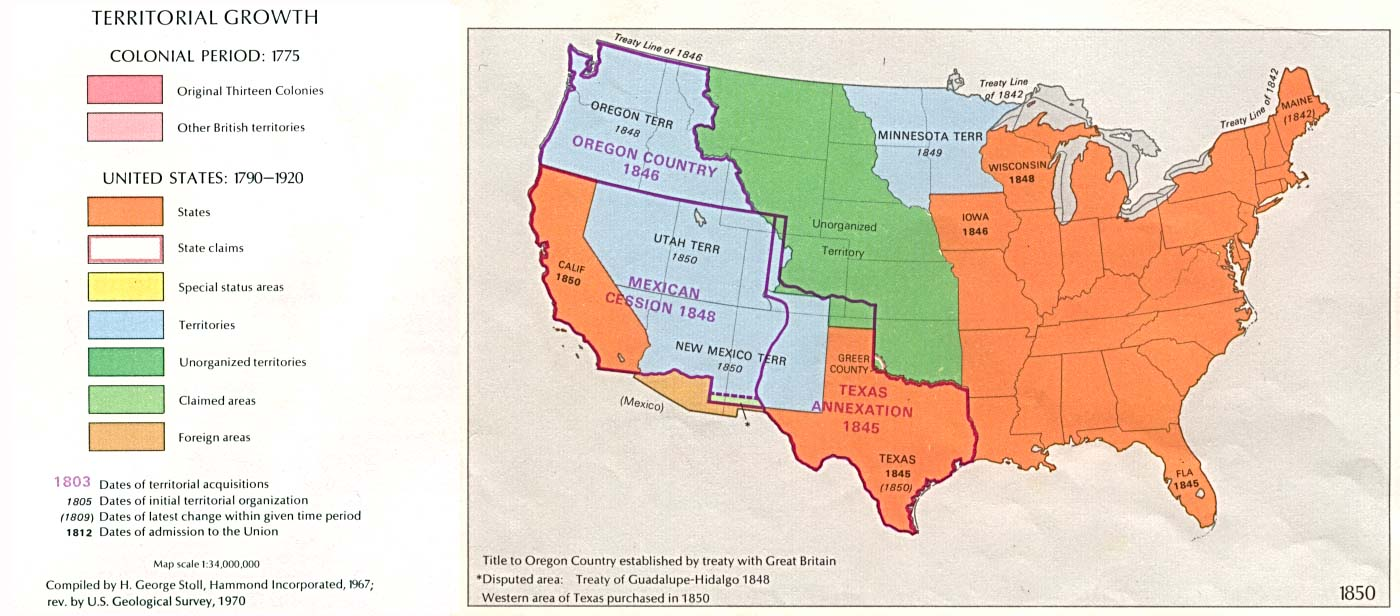
United States territorial growth from 1840 to 1850

- May 11, 1841 – Lt. Charles Wilkes lands at Fort Nisqually in Puget Sound.
- August 4, 1842 – The Armed Occupation Act is signed, providing for the armed occupation and settlement of the unsettled part of the Peninsula of East Florida.
- August 9, 1842 – The Webster–Ashburton Treaty is signed, settling the dispute over the location of the Maine–New Brunswick border between the United States and Canada, and establishing the United States–Canada border east of the Rocky Mountains.
- May 22, 1843 – The first major wagon train headed for the American Northwest sets out with one thousand pioneers from Elm Grove, Missouri, on the Oregon Trail.
- March 3, 1845 – Florida is admitted as the 27th U.S. state.
- December 2, 1845 – Manifest destiny: U.S. President James K. Polk announces to Congress that the Monroe Doctrine should be strictly enforced and that the United States should aggressively expand into the West.
- December 29, 1845 – Texas is admitted as the 28th U.S. state.
- June 15, 1846 – The Oregon Treaty establishes the 49th parallel as the border between the United States and Canada, from the Rocky Mountains to the Strait of Juan de Fuca.
- 1846 – The portion of the District of Columbia that was ceded by Virginia in 1790 is re-ceded to Virginia.
- December 28, 1846 – Iowa is admitted as the 29th U.S. state.
- July 24, 1847 – After 17 months of travel, Brigham Young leads 148 Mormon pioneers into Salt Lake Valley, resulting in the establishment of Salt Lake City.
  May 29: Wisconsin admitted as the 30th U.S. state.
- May 29, 1848 – Wisconsin is admitted as the 30th U.S. state.
- 1848 – The Illinois and Michigan Canal is completed.
- March 3, 1849 – Minnesota becomes a United States territory

===== Native Americans =====
Chief Joseph of the Nez Perce was predicted to have been born in the 1840s.

===== Presidents =====
The United States had five different Presidents during the decade. Only the 1880s would have as many. Martin Van Buren was president when the decade began, but was defeated by William Henry Harrison in the U.S. presidential election of 1840. Harrison's service was the shortest in history, starting with his inauguration on March 4, 1841, and ending when he died on April 4, 1841.

Harrison's vice president, John Tyler, replaced him as President (the first such Presidential succession in U.S. history), and served out the rest of his term. Tyler spent much of his term in conflict with the Whig party. He ended his term having made an alliance with the Democrats, endorsing James K. Polk and signing the resolution to annex Texas into the United States.

In the Presidential election of 1844, James K. Polk defeated Henry Clay. During his presidency, Polk oversaw the U.S. victory in the Mexican–American War and subsequent annexation of what is now the southwest United States. He also negotiated a split of the Oregon Territory with Great Britain.

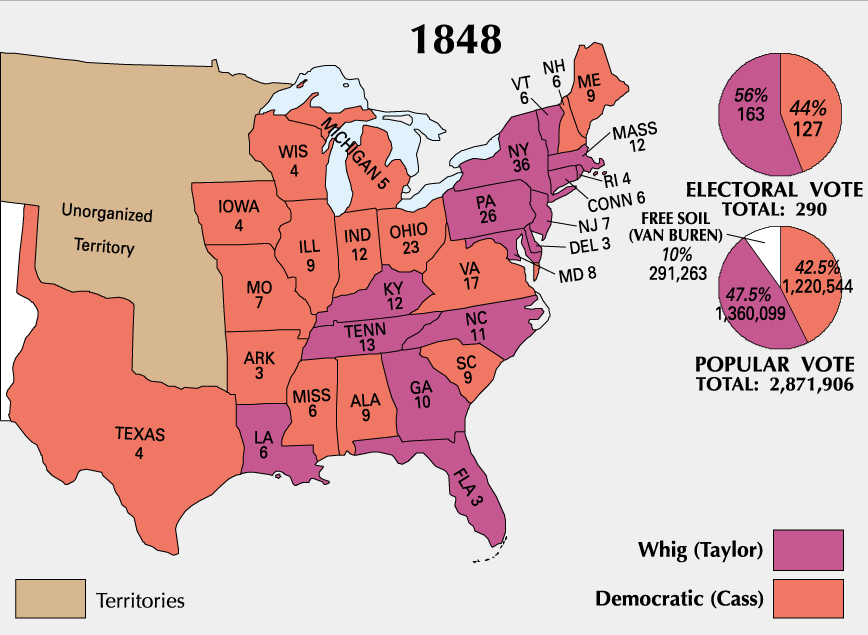
November 7: The first US presidential election held in every state on the same day sees Whig Zachary Taylor of Virginia defeat Democrat Lewis Cass of Michigan.

In the U.S. presidential election of 1848, Whig Zachary Taylor of Louisiana defeated Democrat Lewis Cass of Michigan. Taylor's term in office was cut short by his death in 1850.

===== California =====
In the first part of the 1840s, the modern state of California was part of a larger province of Mexico, called "Alta California". The region included all of the modern American states of California, Nevada and Utah, and parts of Arizona, Wyoming, Colorado and New Mexico.

The United States, embarked on the Conquest of California in an early military campaign of the Mexican–American War in Alta California. The California Campaign was marked by a series of small battles throughout 1846 and early 1847. The Treaty of Cahuenga was signed on January 13, 1847, and essentially terminated hostilities in Alta California. Shortly thereafter, John C. Frémont was appointed Governor of the new California Territory, and Yerba Buena, California, was renamed San Francisco.

The Treaty of Guadalupe Hidalgo, signed in February 1848, marked the end of the Mexican–American War. By the terms of the treaty, Mexico formally ceded Alta California along with its other northern territories east through Texas, receiving $15,000,000 in exchange. This largely unsettled territory constituted nearly half of its claimed territory with about 1% of its then population of about 4,500,000.

The discovery of gold in Northern California (and subsequent discourse about that discovery in 1848) led to the California Gold Rush. In October 1848, the SS California left New York Harbor, rounded Cape Horn at the tip of South America, and arrived in San Francisco after the 4-month-21-day journey. Thereafter, regular steamboat service continued from the west to the east coast of the United States. During 1848, only an estimated 6,000 to 6,500 people traveled to California to seek gold that year. By the beginning of 1849, word of the Gold Rush had spread around the world, and an overwhelming number of gold-seekers and merchants began to arrive from virtually every continent. In 1849, an estimated 90,000 people arrived in California in 1849—of which 50,000 to 60,000 were from the United States. In 1850, California joined the union as the 31st state.

==== Texas ====
The Republic of Texas had declared independence in 1836, as part of breaking away from Mexico in the Texas Revolution. The following year, an ambassador from Texas approached the United States about the possibility of becoming an American state. Fearing a war with Mexico, which did not recognize Texas independence, the United States declined the offer.

In 1844, James K. Polk was elected the United States president after promising to annex Texas. Before he assumed office, the outgoing president, John Tyler, entered negotiations with Texas. On February 26, 1845, six days before Polk took office, the U.S. Congress approved the annexation. The Texas legislature approved annexation in July 1845 and constructed a state constitution. In October, Texas residents approved the annexation and the new constitution, and Texas was officially inducted into the United States on December 29, 1845, as the 28th U.S. state. Mexico still considered Texas to be a renegade Mexican state, and never considered land south of the Nueces River to be part of Texas. This border dispute between the newly expanded United States and Mexico triggered the Mexican–American War.

When the war concluded, Mexico relinquished its claim on Texas, as well as other regions in what is now the southwestern United States. Texas' annexation as a state that tolerated slavery had caused tension in the United States among slave states and those that did not allow slavery. The tension was partially defused with the Compromise of 1850, in which Texas ceded some of its territory to the federal government to become non-slave-owning areas but gained El Paso.

==== Mexican–American War ====
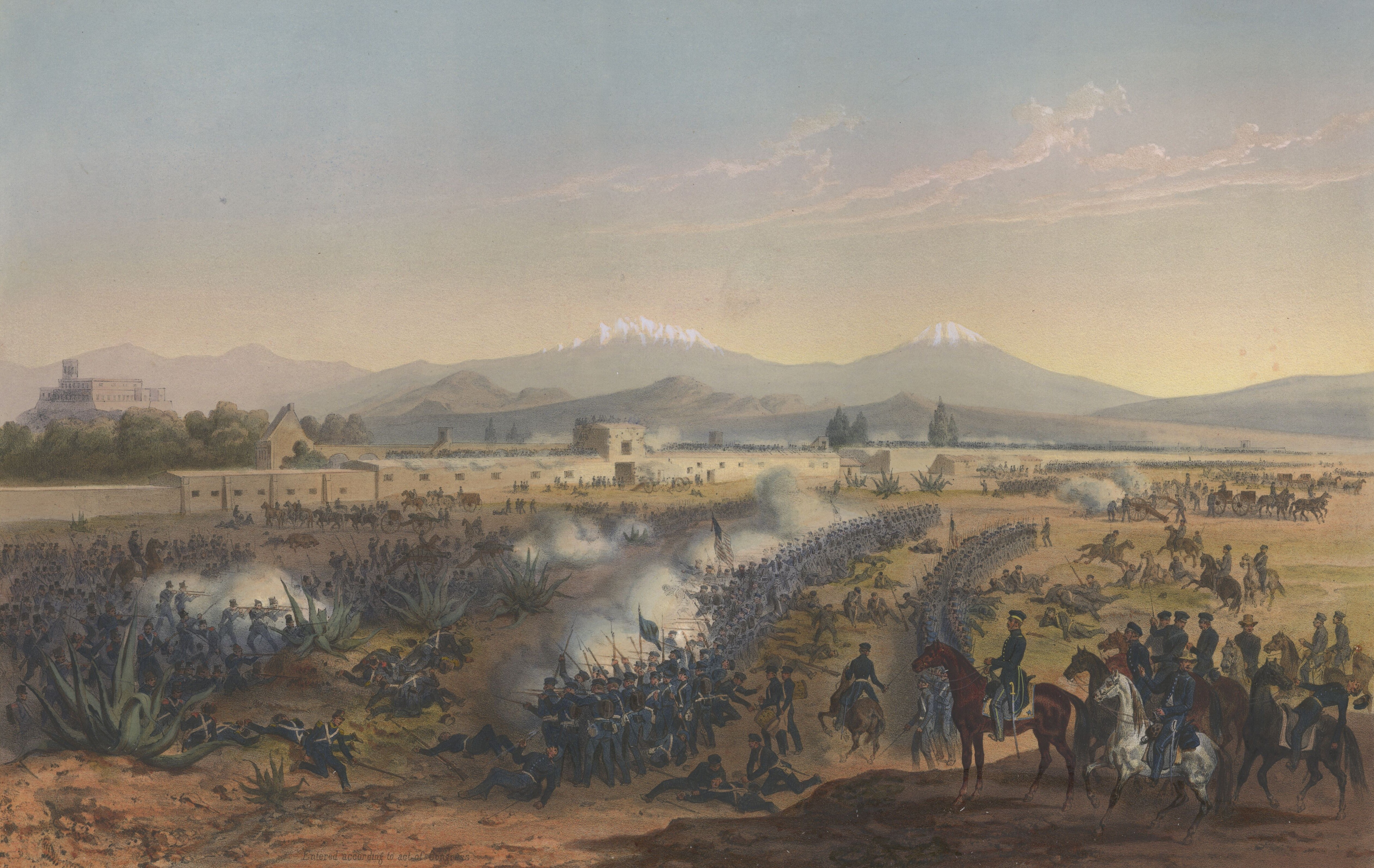
Mexican–American War

American territorial expansion to the Pacific coast was a major goal of U.S. President James K. Polk. In 1845, the United States of America annexed Texas, which had won independence from Centralist Republic of Mexico in the Texas Revolution of 1836. Mexico did not accept the annexation, while also continuing to claim the Nueces River as its border with Texas~~,~~ and also still considering Texas to be a province of Mexico. In 1845, newly elected U.S. President James K. Polk sent troops to the disputed area, and a diplomatic mission to Mexico. After Mexican forces attacked American forces, the U.S. declared the Mexican–American War (1846–1848).

Combat operations lasted a year and a half, from the spring of 1846 to the fall of 1847. U.S. forces quickly occupied the capital town of Santa Fe de Nuevo México along the upper Rio Grande and began the Conquest of California in Mexico's Alta California Department. They then invaded to the south into parts of central Mexico (modern-day northeastern Mexico and northwest Mexico). Meanwhile, the Pacific Squadron of the United States Navy conducted a blockade and took control of several garrisons on the Pacific coast farther south in lower Baja California Territory. The U.S. Army eventually captured the capital Mexico City, having marched west from the port of Veracruz, where the Americans staged their first amphibious landing on the Gulf of Mexico coast.

The 1848 Treaty of Guadalupe Hidalgo, forced onto the remnant Mexican government, ended the war and specified its major consequence, the Mexican Cession of the northern territories of Alta California and Santa Fe de Nuevo México to the United States. The U.S. agreed to pay $15 million compensation for the physical damage of the war. In addition, the United States assumed $3.25 million of debt already owed earlier by the Mexican government to U.S. citizens. Mexico acknowledged the loss of their province, later the Republic of Texas (and now the State of Texas), and thereafter cited and acknowledged the Rio Grande as its future northern national border with the United States. Including Texas, Mexico ceded an area of approximately 2,500,000 square kilometres (970,000 sq mi) – by its terms, around 55% of its former national territory.

==== Mexico ====
The 1840s for Mexico were the end of the centralist government and the waning years the "Age of Santa Anna". In 1834, President Antonio López de Santa Anna dissolved Congress, forming a new government. That government instituted the new Centralist Republic of Mexico by approving a new centralist constitution ("Siete Leyes"), From its formation in 1835 until its dissolution in 1846, the Centralist Republic was governed by eleven presidents (none of which finished their term). It called for the state militias to disarm, but many states resisted, including Mexican Texas, which won its independence in the Texas Revolution of 1836.

The Republic of the Rio Grande declared its independence from Mexico in January 1840. However, the border with Texas was never determined (whether the Nueces River or the Rio Grande). The new Republic fought a brief and unsuccessful war for independence, returning to Mexico late in the year.

In 1841, Generals Santa Anna and Paredes led a rebellion against President Bustamante, resulting in Santa Anna becoming president of the centralist government for a fifth time. Local officials in Yucatán declared independence in 1841, opposing strong autocratic rule and demanding the restoration of the Constitution of 1824, thus establishing the second Republic of Yucatán.

In 1842, the region of Soconusco was annexed by Mexico as part of the state of Chiapas, following the dissolution of the Federal Republic of Central America.

In 1846, President Paredes and the Congress of Mexico declared war at the beginning of the Mexican–American War. Paredes' presidential successor was deposed in a coup, replaced by José Mariano Salas. Salas issued a new decree that restored the Constitution of 1824, ending the Centralist Republic and beginning the Second Federal Republic of Mexico. After the conclusion of the Mexican–American War, José Joaquín de Herrera became the second president of Mexico to finish his term (Mexico's first president completed his in 1829). It was during this time that Yucatán reunited with Mexico. A decisive factor for the reunion was the Caste War of Yucatán (a revolt by the indigenous Maya population) for which Yucatán initially sought help from Spain, the United Kingdom, and the United States, but ultimately reunited with Mexico for help.

Herrera peacefully turned over the presidency to the winner of the Federal Elections of 1850, General Mariano Arista. Despite being exiled from Mexico in 1848, Santa Anna would return to the presidency one last time during the 1850s.

==== El Salvador ====
- February – El Salvador proclaims itself an independent republic, bringing an end to the (already de facto defunct) Federal Republic of Central America.

=== Caribbean ===
==== Barbados ====
- June 6, 1843 – In Barbados, Samuel Jackman Prescod is the first non-white person elected to the House of Assembly.

==== Dominican Republic ====
- February 27, 1844 – The Dominican Republic gains independence from Haiti.
- November 6, 1844 – The Dominican Republic drafts its first Constitution.

==== Haiti ====
- March 1, 1847 – Faustin Soulouque declares himself Emperor of Haiti.

==== Trinidad ====
- May 30, 1845 – Fatel Razack (Fath Al Razack, "Victory of Allah the Provider", Arabic: قتح الرزاق) is the first ship to bring indentured labourers from India to Trinidad, landing in the Gulf of Paria with 227 immigrants.

=== South America ===
==== Brazil ====
- July 23, 1840 – Pedro II is declared "of age" prematurely and begins to reassert central control in Brazil.
- July 18, 1841 – Coronation ceremony of Emperor Pedro II of Brazil in Rio de Janeiro.
- January 20, 1843 – Honório Hermeto Carneiro Leão, Marquis of Paraná, becomes de facto first prime minister of the Empire of Brazil.
- September 4, 1843 – The Emperor Dom Pedro II of Brazil marries Dona Teresa Cristina of the Two Sicilies in a state ceremony in Rio de Janeiro Cathedral.

==== Uruguay ====
- February 3, 1843 – Argentina supports Rosas of Uruguay and begins a siege of Montevideo.

==== Paraguay ====
- 1844 – Carlos Antonio López becomes dictator of Paraguay.

==== Argentina ====
- September 18, 1845 – Anglo-French blockade of the Río de la Plata formally declared.
- November 20, 1845 – Anglo-French blockade of the Río de la Plata: Battle of Vuelta de Obligado: The Argentine Confederation is narrowly defeated by an Anglo-French fleet on the waters of the Paraná River but Argentina attracts political support in South America.

==== Venezuela ====
- 1843 – Germans from the Black Forest region of Southern Baden migrate to Venezuela.

==== Peru ====
- April 20, 1845 – Ramón Castilla becomes president of Peru.

==== Chile ====
- May 23, 1843 – Chile takes possession of the Strait of Magellan.

== Science and technology ==
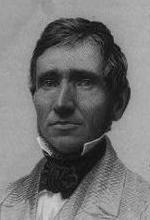
June 15: Charles Goodyear.

=== Astronomy ===
- Eta Carinae is temporarily the second-brightest star in the night sky.
- September 23, 1846 – Discovery of Neptune: The planet is observed for the first time by German astronomers Johann Gottfried Galle and Heinrich Louis d'Arrest as predicted by the British astronomer John Couch Adams and the French astronomer Urbain Le Verrier.
- September 16, 1848 – William Cranch Bond and William Lassell discover Hyperion, Saturn's moon.

=== Photography ===
The 1840s saw the rise of the Daguerreotype. Introduced in 1839, the Daguerreotype was the first publicly announced photographic process and came into widespread use in the 1840s. Numerous events in the 1840s were captured by photography for the first time with the use of the Daguerreotype. A number of daguerreotypes were taken of the occupation of Saltillo during the Mexican–American War, in 1847 by an unknown photographer. These photographs stand as the first ever photos of warfare in history.

=== Telegraph ===
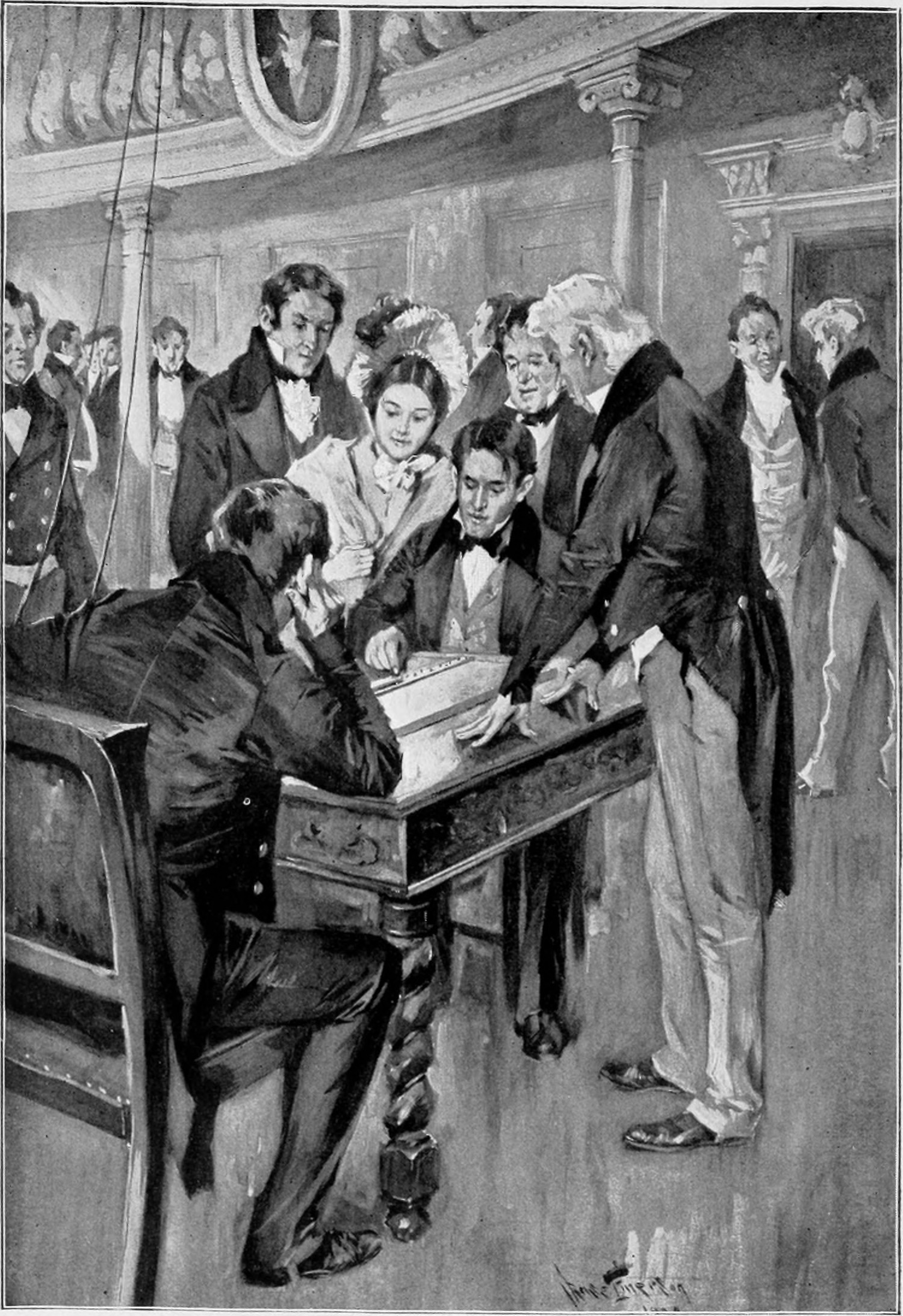
The first telegram. Professor Samuel Morse sending the dispatch as dictated by Miss Annie Ellsworth

- The first electrical telegraph sent by Samuel Morse on May 24, 1844, from Baltimore to Washington, D.C.

=== Computers ===
- 1843 – Ada Lovelace translates and expands Menabrea's notes on Charles Babbage's analytical engine, including an algorithm for calculating a sequence of Bernoulli numbers, regarded as the world's first computer program.

=== Chemistry ===
- June 15, 1844 – Charles Goodyear receives a patent for vulcanization, a process to strengthen rubber.
- 1844 – Swedish chemistry professor Gustaf Erik Pasch invents the safety match.
- 1846 – Abraham Pineo Gesner develops a process to refine a liquid fuel, which he calls kerosene, from coal, bitumen or oil shale.

=== Geology ===
- 1840 – Louis Agassiz publishes his Etudes sur les glaciers ("Study on Glaciers", 2 volumes), the first major scientific work to propose that the Earth has seen an ice age.

=== Physics ===
- 1840 – The first English translation of Goethe's Theory of Colours by Charles Eastlake is published.
- 1842 – Julius Robert von Mayer proposes that work and heat are equivalent.
- October 16, 1843 – William Rowan Hamilton discovers the calculus of quaternions and deduces that they are non-commutative.
- 1843 – James Joule experimentally finds the mechanical equivalent of heat.

=== Biology ===
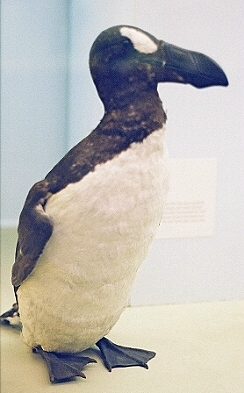
July 3: great auk.

- July 3, 1844 – The last definitely recorded pair of great auks are killed on the Icelandic island of Eldey.
- 1844 – The anonymously written Vestiges of the Natural History of Creation is published and paves the way for the acceptance of Darwin's book The Origin of Species.

==== Paleontology ====
- 1842 – English palaeontologist Richard Owen coins the name Dinosauria, hence the Anglicized dinosaur.

=== Psychology ===
- November 13, 1841 – Scottish surgeon James Braid first sees a demonstration of animal magnetism by Charles Lafontaine in Manchester, which leads to his study of the phenomenon that he (Braid) eventually calls hypnotism.

=== Archaeology ===
- May 15, 1840 – Discovered by several workmen, the Cuerdale Hoard becomes one of the largest haul of Viking-period jewellery, coins and other items totalling 8,600 finds.

=== Economics ===
- June 20, 1842 – Anselmo de Andrade, Portuguese economist and politician, is born in Vila Real de Santo António.
- August 28, 1844 – Friedrich Engels and Karl Marx meet in Paris, France.
- 1845 – Friedrich Engels' treatise The Condition of the Working Class in England in 1844 is published in Leipzig as Die Lage der arbeitenden Klasse in England.
- June 1, 1847 – The first congress of the Communist League is held in London.

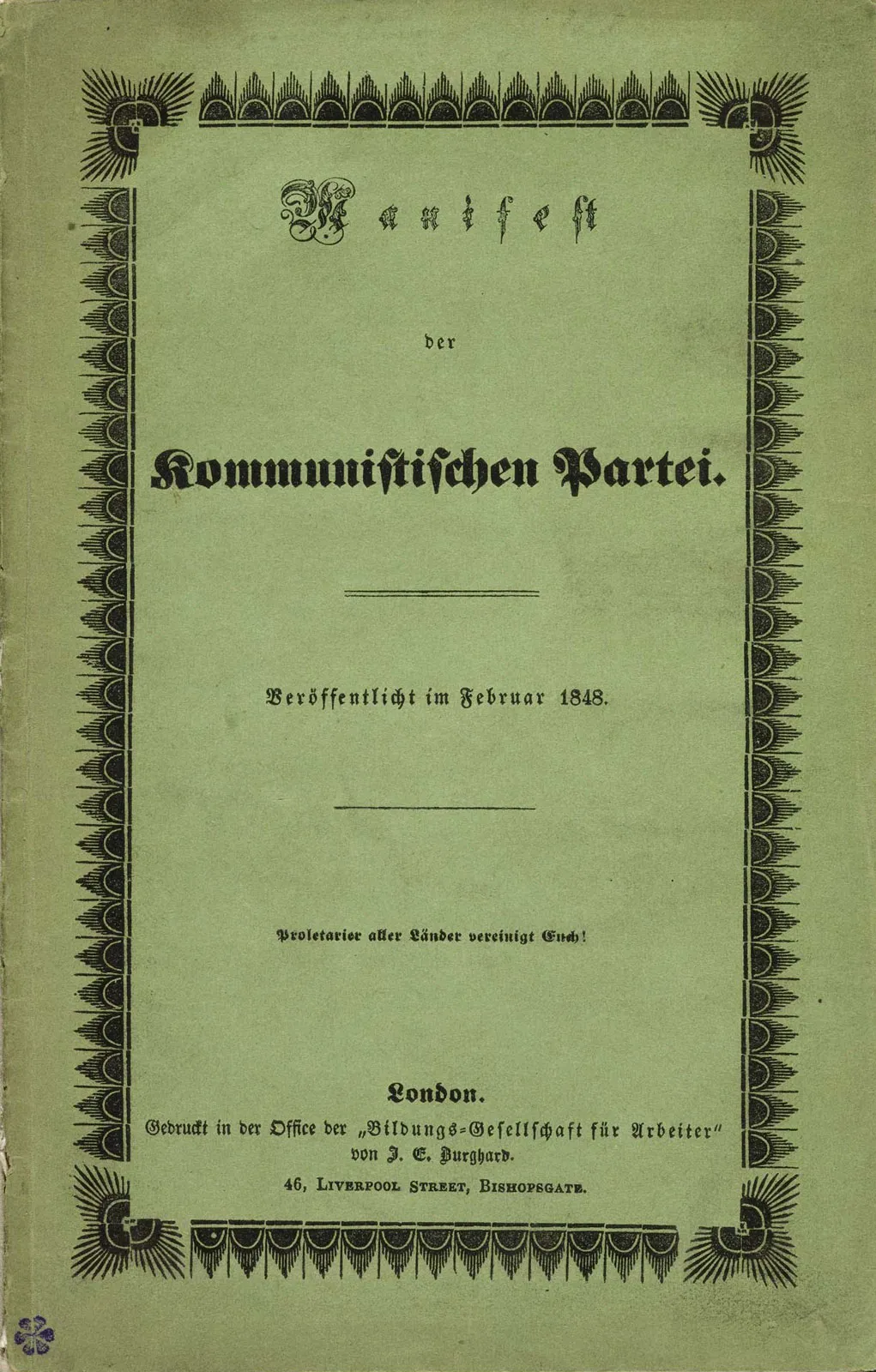
February 21: Karl Marx publishes The Communist Manifesto.

- February 21, 1848 – Karl Marx and Friedrich Engels publish The Communist Manifesto (Manifest der Kommunistischen Partei) in London.

=== Medicine ===
- March 30, 1842 – Anesthesia is used for the first time in an operation (Dr. Crawford Long performed the operation using ether).
- December 27, 1845 – Anesthesia is used for childbirth for the first time (Dr. Crawford Long in Jefferson, Georgia).
- November 4 – 8, 1847 – James Young Simpson discovers the anesthetic properties of chloroform and first uses it, successfully, on a patient, in an obstetric case in Edinburgh.
- January 23, 1849 – Elizabeth Blackwell is awarded her M.D. by the Medical Institute of Geneva, New York, thus becoming the United States' first woman doctor.

=== Technology ===
- 1840s – The Wenham Lake Ice Company, in collaboration with Frederic Tudor, played a pioneering role in the mass production and commercial distribution of ice on an industrial scale. This laid the groundwork for the eventual standardization of ice as a commonplace commodity for domestic and everyday use.
- 1845 – The Underwater telescope is patented by Sarah Mather, permitting sea-going vessels to survey the depths of the ocean

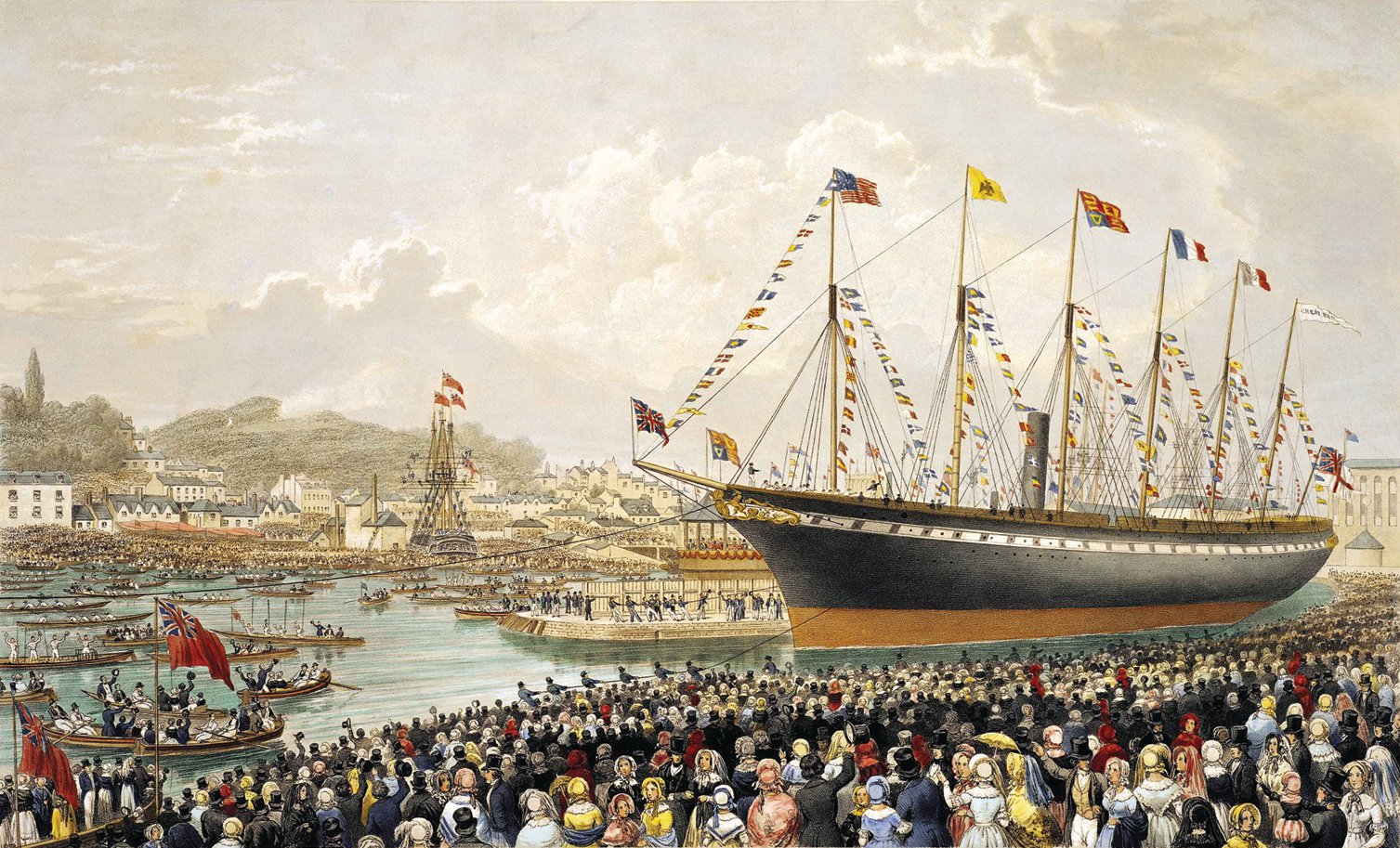
The 1843 launch of the Great Britain, the revolutionary ship of Isambard Kingdom Brunel

=== Exploration ===
==== Antarctica ====
- January 19, 1840 – Captain Charles Wilkes' United States Exploring Expedition sights what becomes known as Wilkes Land in the southeast quadrant of Antarctica, claiming it for the United States and providing evidence that Antarctica is a complete continent.
- January 21, 1840 – Dumont D'Urville discovers Adélie Land in Antarctica, claiming it for France.
- January 27, 1841 – The active volcano Mount Erebus in Antarctica is discovered and named by James Clark Ross.
- January 28, 1841 – Ross discovers the "Victoria Barrier", later known as the Ross Ice Shelf. On the same voyage, he discovers the Ross Sea, Victoria Land and Mount Terror.
- January 23, 1842 – Antarctic explorer James Clark Ross, charting the eastern side of James Ross Island, reaches a Farthest South of 78°09'30"S.
- January 6, 1843 – Antarctic explorer James Clark Ross discovers Snow Hill Island.

=== Transportation ===
==== Rail ====
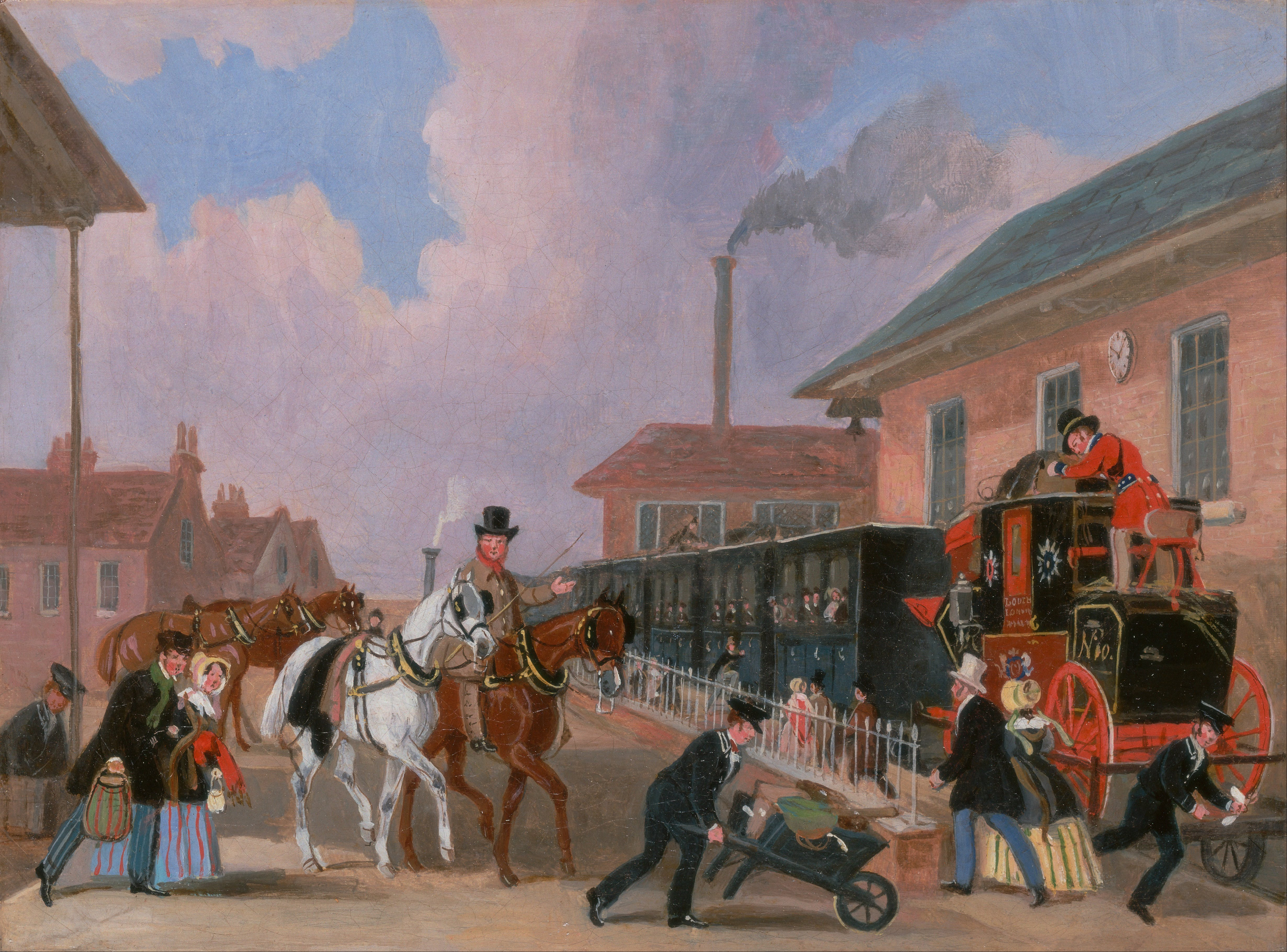
The Louth-London Royal Mail travelling by train from Peterborough East, 1845

Widespread interest to invest in rail technology led to a speculative frenzy in Britain, known there as Railway Mania. It reached its zenith in 1846, when no fewer than 272 Acts of Parliament were passed, setting up new railway companies, and the proposed routes totalled 9,500 miles (15,300 km) of new railway. Around a third of the railways authorised were never built – the company either collapsed due to poor financial planning, was bought out by a larger competitor before it could build its line, or turned out to be a fraudulent enterprise to channel investors' money into another business.

==== Steam power ====
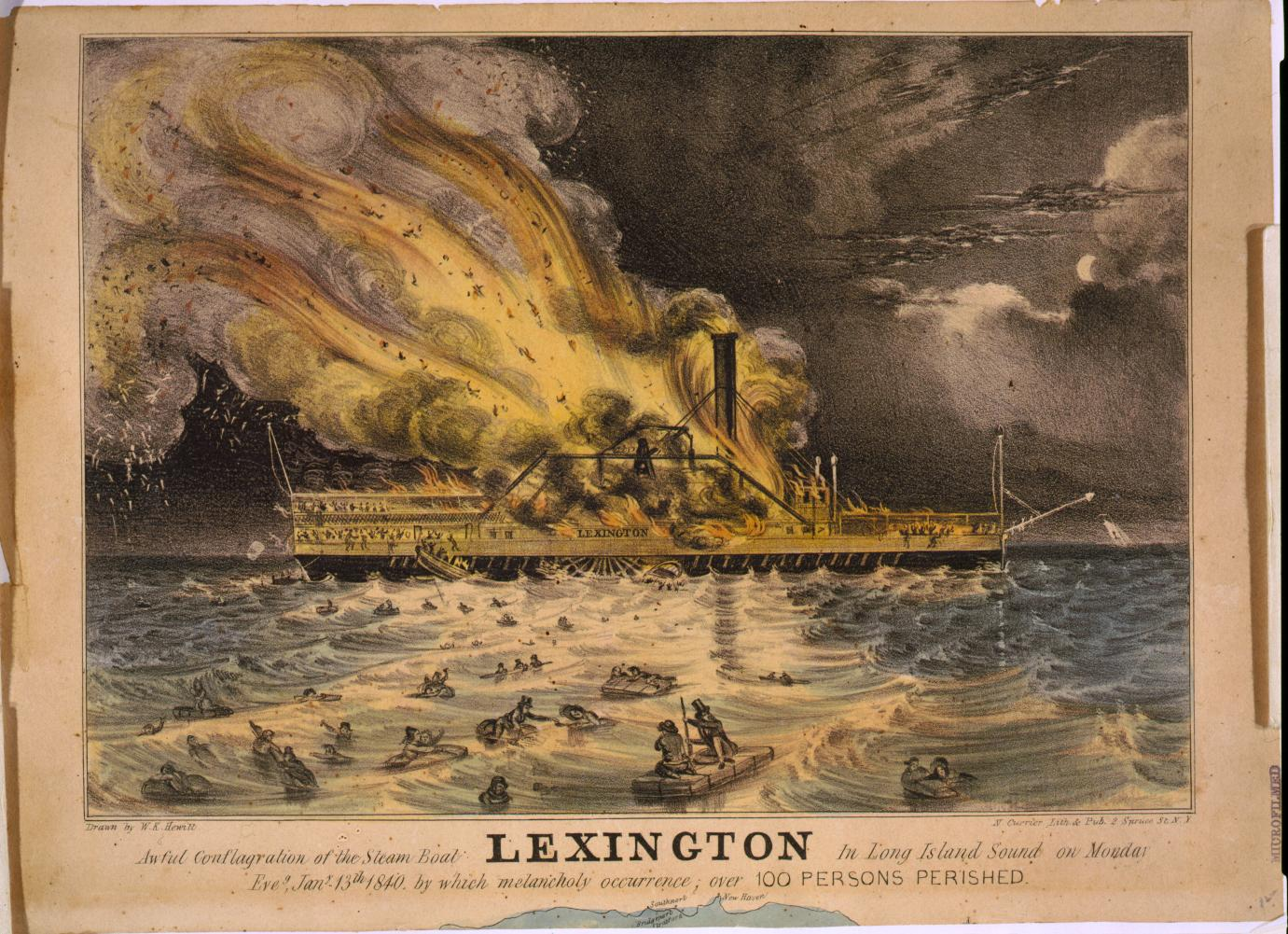
January 13: Steamship Lexington sinks.

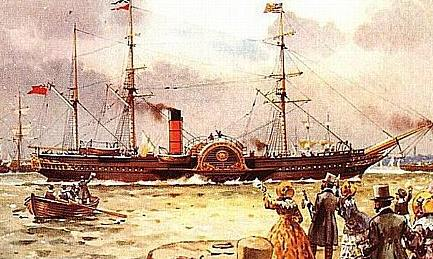
July 4: RMS Britannia.

- July 4, 1840 – The Cunard Line's 700-ton wooden paddlewheel steamer RMS Britannia departs from Liverpool, bound for Halifax, Nova Scotia, on the first steam transatlantic passenger mail service.

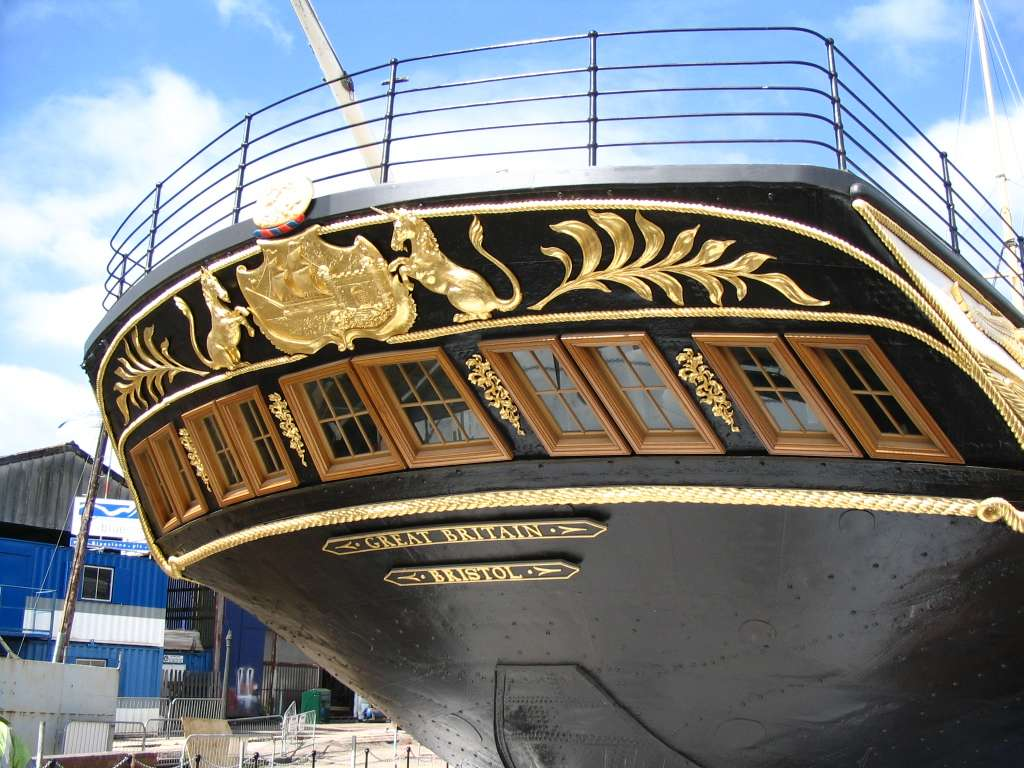
July 19: SS Great Britain launch.

- July 19, 1843 – Isambard Kingdom Brunel's SS Great Britain is launched from Bristol; it will be the first iron-hulled, propeller-driven ship to cross the Atlantic Ocean.
- 1843 – The steam powered rotary printing press is invented by Richard March Hoe in the United States.
- July 26 – August 10, 1845 – Isambard Kingdom Brunel's iron steamship Great Britain makes the Transatlantic Crossing from Liverpool to New York, the first screw propelled vessel to make the passage.

=== Other inventions ===
- October 5, 1842 – Josef Groll brews the first pilsner beer in the city of Pilsen, Bohemia (now the Czech Republic).
- September 10, 1846 – Elias Howe is awarded the first United States patent for a sewing machine using a lockstitch design.

== Commerce ==
- In the mid-1840s several harvests failed across Europe, which caused famines. Especially the Great Irish Famine (1845–1849) was severe and caused a quarter of Ireland's population to die or emigrate to the United States, Canada and Australia.
- The Panic of 1837 triggered by the failing banks in America is followed by a severe depression lasting until 1845.
- May 6, 1840 – The Penny Black, the world's first postage stamp, becomes valid for the pre-payment of postage.
- August 10, 1840 – Fortsas hoax: A number of book collectors gather in Binche, Belgium, to attend a non-existent book auction of the late "Count of Fortsas".
- December – The world's first Christmas cards, commissioned by Sir Henry Cole in London from the artist John Callcott Horsley, are sent.
- 1843 – The export of British textile machinery and other equipment is allowed.
- 1844 – Annual British iron production reaches 3 million tons.
- January 4, 1847 – Samuel Colt sells his first revolver pistol to the U.S government.
- The California Gold Rush follows on the heels of the Mexican–American War, bringing tens of thousands of immigrants to California and eliminating the United States' dependence on foreign gold.

== Civil rights ==
=== Women's rights ===
- July 19, 1848 – Women's rights, 1848 – Seneca Falls Convention: The 2-day Women's Rights Convention opens in Seneca Falls, New York, and the "Bloomers" are introduced at the feminist convention.

== Popular culture ==
=== Literature ===
- Charles Dickens publishes The Old Curiosity Shop, Barnaby Rudge, A Christmas Carol, Martin Chuzzlewit, Dombey and Son and David Copperfield.
- Nikolai Gogol's Dead Souls (Russian: Мёртвые души, Myortvyje dushi) is published in 1842.
- Søren Kierkegaard publishes his philosophical book Enten ‒ Eller (Either/Or) in 1843.
- Alexandre Dumas publishes Les Trois Mousquetaires (The Three Musketeers) in 1844 and Le Comte de Monte-Cristo (The Count of Monte Cristo) in 1844/45.
- William Makepeace Thackeray publishes Vanity Fair in 1848.
- July 17, 1841 – First edition of the humorous magazine Punch published in London.
- 1843 – Edgar Allan Poe's short story The Tell-Tale Heart is first published.
- Hans Christian Andersen publishes well-known fairy tales, such as The Ugly Duckling (1843) and The Snow Queen (1844).
- January 29, 1845 – "The Raven" by Edgar Allan Poe is published for the first time (New York Evening Mirror), earning him $10.
- 1845 – Elizabeth Barrett Browning writes her Sonnets from the Portuguese (1845–1846).
- 1845 – Heinrich Hoffmann publishes a book (Lustige Geschichten und drollige Bilder) introducing his character Struwwelpeter, in Germany.
- October 16, 1847 – Charlotte Brontë publishes Jane Eyre under the pen name of Currer Bell.
- December 14, 1847 – Emily Brontë and Anne Brontë publish Wuthering Heights and Agnes Grey, respectively, in a 3-volume set under the pen names of Ellis Bell and Acton Bell.
- 1848 – Elizabeth Gaskell publishes Mary Barton anonymously.

=== Theatre ===
- February 6, 1843 – The Virginia Minstrels perform the first minstrel show, at the Bowery Amphitheatre in New York City.

=== Music ===
- 1840s – Franz Liszt performs a series of concerts throughout Europe, which generate international euphoria and fascination known as Lisztomania.
- February 11, 1840 – Gaetano Donizetti's opera La fille du régiment premieres in Paris.
- June 28, 1841 – Ballet Giselle first presented by the Ballet du Théâtre de l'Académie Royale de Musique at the Salle Le Peletier in Paris, France.
- March 9, 1842 – Giuseppe Verdi's third opera Nabucco premieres in Milan; its success establishes Verdi as one of Italy's foremost opera writers.
- February 11, 1843 – Giuseppe Verdi's opera I Lombardi alla prima crociata premieres at La Scala in Milan.
- November 3, 1844 – Giuseppe Verdi's I due Foscari debuts at Teatro Argentina, Rome.
- March 13, 1845 – The Violin Concerto by Felix Mendelssohn premieres in Leipzig, with Ferdinand David as soloist.
- July 7, 1845 – Jules Perrot presents the ballet divertissement Pas de Quatre to an enthusiastic London audience.
- June 28, 1846 – The Saxophone is patented by Adolphe Sax.
- March 14, 1847 – Verdi's opera Macbeth premieres at Teatro della Pergola in Florence, Italy.
- 1847 – Liszt surprisingly ends his career as a concert pianist and from then on fully dedicates himself to composition.
- 1848 – The Shaker song Simple Gifts is written by Joseph Brackett in Alfred, Maine.
- 1848 – Richard Wagner begins writing the libretto that will become Der Ring des Nibelungen (The Ring of the Nibelung).

=== Sports ===
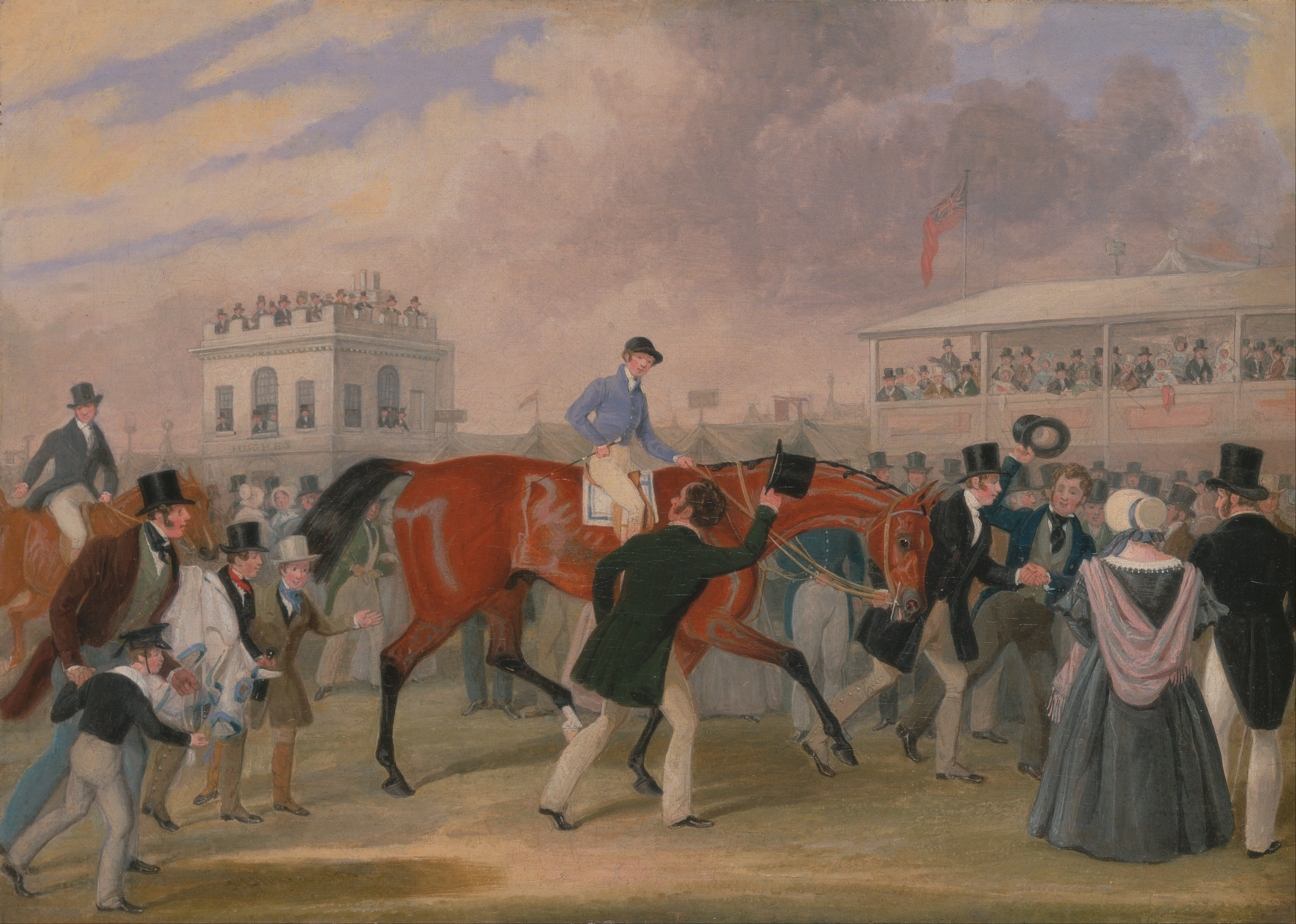
The Epsom Derby; painting by James Pollard, c. 1840

- March 2, 1842 – Gaylad, ridden by Tom Olliver, wins the Grand National at Aintree Racecourse.
- September 25 – September 27, 1844 – The first ever international cricket match is played in New York City, United States v Canadian Provinces.
- Baseball – During the 1840s, "town ball" evolved into the modern game of baseball, with the development of the "New York game" in the 1840s. The New York Knickerbockers were founded in 1845, and played the first known competitive game between two organized clubs in 1846. The "New York Nine" defeated the Knickerbockers at Elysian Fields in Hoboken, New Jersey, by a score of 23 to 1.

=== Fashion ===
Queen Victoria and the Prince Consort at home, 1841. Her dress shows the fashionable silhouette, with its pointed waist, sloping shoulder, and bell-shaped skirt.

Fashion in European and European-influenced clothing is characterized by a narrow, natural shoulder line following the exaggerated puffed sleeves of the later 1820s fashion and 1830s fashion. The narrower shoulder was accompanied by a lower waistline for both men and women.

=== Art ===
- 1840 – J. M. W. Turner first displays his painting The Slave Ship.

== Religion and philosophy ==
- The American Transcendentalism movement is in full form mostly during this decade.
- February 1840 – The Rhodes blood libel is made against the Jews of Rhodes.
- February 5, 1840 – The murder of a Capuchin friar and his Greek servant leads to the Damascus affair, a highly publicized case of blood libel against the Jews of Damascus.
- June 6, 1841 Marian Hughes becomes the first woman to take religious vows in communion with the Anglican Province of Canterbury since the Reformation, making them privately to E. B. Pusey in Oxford.
- July – Scottish missionary David Livingstone arrives at Kuruman in the Northern Cape, his first posting in Africa.
- May 18, 1843 – The Disruption in Edinburgh of the Free Church of Scotland from the Church of Scotland.
- October 16, 1843 – Søren Kierkegaard's philosophical book Fear and Trembling is first published.
- March 21, 1844 – The Baháʼí calendar begins.
- March 23, 1844 – Edict of Toleration, allowing Jews to settle in the Holy Land.
- May 23, 1844 – Persian Prophet The Báb privately announces his revelation to Mullá Husayn, just after sunset, founding the Bábí faith (later evolving into the Baháʼí Faith as the Báb intended) in Shiraz, Persia (now Iran). Contemporaneously, on this day in nearby Tehran, was the birth of `Abdu'l-Bahá; the eldest Son of Bahá'u'lláh, Prophet-Founder of the Baháʼí Faith, the inception of which, the Báb's proclaimed His own mission was to herald. `Abdu'l-Bahá Himself was later proclaimed by Bahá'u'lláh to be His own successor, thus being the third "central figure" of the Baháʼí Faith.
- June 27, 1844 – Joseph Smith, founder of the Latter Day Saint movement, and his brother Hyrum, are killed in Carthage Jail, Carthage, Illinois, by an armed mob, leading to a Succession crisis. John Taylor, future president of the Church of Jesus Christ of Latter-day Saints is severely injured but survives.
- August 8, 1844 – During a meeting held in Nauvoo, Illinois, the Quorum of the Twelve, headed by Brigham Young, is chosen as the leading body of the Church of Jesus Christ of Latter-day Saints.
- October 22, 1844 – This second date, predicted by the Millerites for the Second Coming of Jesus, leads to the Great Disappointment. The Seventh-day Adventist Church denomination of the Christian religion believe this date to be the starting point of the Investigative judgment just prior to the Second Coming of Jesus as declared in the 26th of 28 fundamental doctrines of Seventh-day Adventists.
- October 23, 1844 – The Báb publicly proclaimed to be the promised one of Islam (the Qá'im, or Mahdi). He is also considered to be simultaneously the return of Elijah, John the Baptist, and the "Ushídar-Máh" referred to in the Zoroastrian scriptures. He announces to the world the coming of "He whom God shall make manifest". He is considered the forerunner of Bahá'u'lláh, 1844 – the founder of the Baháʼí Faith, 1844 – whose claims include being the return of Jesus.
- October 9, 1845 – The eminent and controversial Anglican, John Henry Newman, is received into the Roman Catholic Church.
- February 10, 1846 – Many Mormons begin their migration west from Nauvoo, Illinois, to the Great Salt Lake, led by Brigham Young.
- June 16, 1846 – Pope Pius IX succeeds Pope Gregory XVI as the 255th pope. He will reign for 31½ years (the longest definitely confirmed).
- September 19, 1846 – The Virgin Mary is said to have appeared to two children in La Salette, France.
- 1848 – John Bird Sumner becomes archbishop of Canterbury.
- March 28, 1849 – Four Christians are ordered burnt alive in Antananarivo, Madagascar by Queen Ranavalona I and 14 others are executed.

== Disasters, natural events, and notable mishaps ==
- January 13, 1840 – The steamship Lexington burns and sinks in icy waters, four miles off the coast of Long Island; 139 die, only four survive.
- May 7, 1840 – The Great Natchez Tornado: A massive tornado strikes Natchez, Mississippi, during the early afternoon hours. Before it is over, 317 people are killed and 109 injured. It is the second deadliest tornado in U.S. history.
- January 30, 1841 – A fire ruins and destroys two-thirds of the villa (modern-day city) of Mayagüez, Puerto Rico.
- February 20, 1841 – The Governor Fenner, carrying emigrants to the United States, sinks off Holyhead (Wales) with the loss of 123 lives.
- March 12, 1841 – SS President under the command of the legendary captain Richard Roberts founders in rough seas with all passengers and crew lost.
- October 30, 1841 – A fire at the Tower of London destroys its Grand Armoury and causes a quarter of a million pounds worth of damage.
- October 29, 1842 – The Iberian Peninsula is struck by a category 2 hurricane.
- 1842 – Dzogchen Monastery is almost completely destroyed by an earthquake.

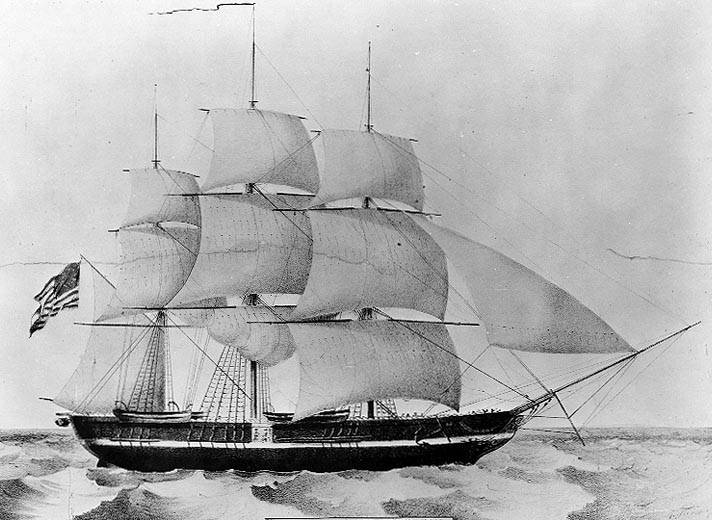
February 28: USS Princeton deaths.

- February 8, 1843 an earthquake causes La Soufriere volcano to erupt in Caribbean Island of Guadeloupe and kill over 5000 people.
- February 28, 1844 – A gun on the USS Princeton explodes while the boat is on a Potomac River cruise, killing 2 United States Cabinet members and several others.
- June–July – The Great Flood of 1844 hits the Missouri River and Mississippi River.
- February 7, 1845 – In the British Museum, a drunken visitor smashes the Portland Vase, which takes months to repair.
- April 10, 1845 – A great fire destroys much of the American city of Pittsburgh.
- May 2, 1845 – the Yarmouth suspension bridge in Great Yarmouth, England, collapses leaving around 80 dead, mostly children.
- May 19, 1845 – HMS Erebus and HMS Terror with 134 men, comprising Sir John Franklin's expedition to find the Northwest Passage, sail from Greenhithe on the Thames. They will last be seen in August entering Baffin Bay.
- 1846 – The Donner Party, a party of American settlers in wagon trains, became stranded in the snow-covered Sierra Nevada in California and resorted to cannibalism to survive.
- April 25, 1847 – The brig Exmouth carrying Irish emigrants from Derry bound for Quebec is wrecked off Islay with only three survivors from more than 250 on board.
- August 24, 1848 – The U.S. barque Ocean Monarch is burnt out off the Great Orme, North Wales, with the loss of 178, chiefly emigrants.
- May 3, 1849 – The Mississippi River levee at Sauvé's Crevasse breaks, flooding much of New Orleans, Louisiana.
- May 10, 1849 – The Astor Place Riot takes place in Manhattan over a dispute between two Shakespearean actors. Over 20 people are killed.
- May 17, 1849 – The St. Louis Fire starts when a steamboat catches fire and nearly burns down the entire city.
- 1849 – Seven of the "best known" opium clippers go missing: Sylph, Coquette, Kelpie, Greyhound, Don Juan, Mischief, and Anna Eliza.

=== Cholera ===
The third cholera pandemic happened during the 1840s, which researchers at UCLA believe may have started as early as 1837 and lasted until 1863. This pandemic was considered to have the highest fatalities of the 19th-century epidemics. It originated in India (in Lower Bengal), spreading along many shipping routes in 1846. Over 15,000 people died of cholera in Mecca in 1846. In Russia, between 1847 and 1851, more than one million people died in the country's epidemic.

A two-year outbreak began in England and Wales in 1848, and claimed 52,000 lives. In London, it was the worst outbreak in the city's history, claiming 14,137 lives, over twice as many as the 1832 outbreak. Cholera hit Ireland in 1849 and killed many of the Irish Famine survivors, already weakened by starvation and fever. In 1849, cholera claimed 5,308 lives in the major port city of Liverpool, England, an embarkation point for immigrants to North America, and 1,834 in Hull, England. In 1849, a second major outbreak occurred in Paris.

Cholera, believed spread from Irish immigrant ship(s) from England to the United States, spread throughout the Mississippi river system, killing over 4,500 in St. Louis and over 3,000 in New Orleans. Thousands died in New York, a major destination for Irish immigrants. The outbreak that struck Nashville in 1849–1850 took the life of former U.S. President James K. Polk. During the California Gold Rush, cholera was transmitted along the California, Mormon and Oregon Trails as 6,000 to 12,000 are believed to have died on their way to Utah and Oregon in the cholera years of 1849–1855. It is believed cholera claimed more than 150,000 victims in the United States during the two pandemics between 1832 and 1849, and also claimed 200,000 victims in Mexico.

== Establishments ==
=== Publications ===
- September 1843 –The Economist newspaper is first published in London.
- 1843 – The Friend, a Quaker weekly, is first published in London.
- August 28, 1845 – The journal Scientific American begins publication.

=== Institutions ===
==== Asia ====
- July 18, 1841 – The sixth bishop of Calcutta, Daniel Wilson, and Dr. James Taylor, Civil Surgeon at Dhaka, establish the first modern educational institution in the Indian subcontinent, Dhaka College.

==== Australia ====
- October 1, 1846 – Christ College, Tasmania, opens with the hope that it would develop along the lines of an Oxbridge college and provide the basis for university education in Tasmania. By the 21st century it will be the oldest tertiary institution in Australia.

==== Europe ====
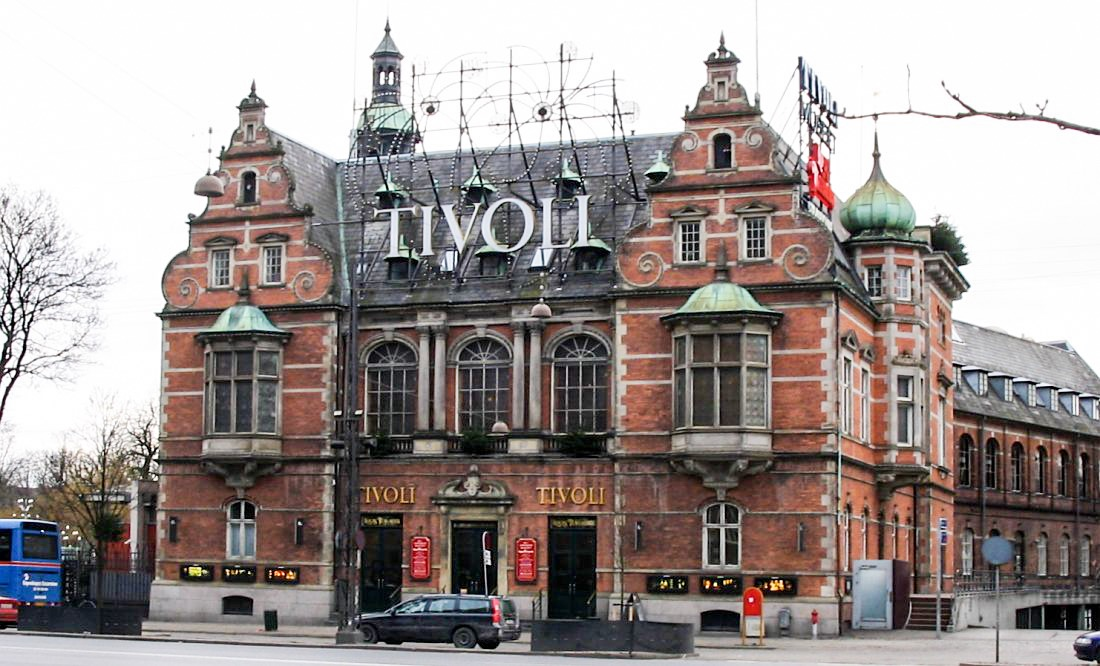
Tivoli Gardens

- April 15, 1840 – King's College Hospital opens in London.
- August 15, 1843 – Tivoli Gardens, one of the oldest still intact amusement parks in the world, opens in Copenhagen, Denmark.
- June 6, 1844 – George Williams founds the Young Men's Christian Association (YMCA) in London.
- December 21, 1844 – The Rochdale Pioneers commence business at their cooperative in Rochdale, England.
- April 5, 1847 – The world's first municipally-funded civic public park, Birkenhead Park in Birkenhead on Merseyside in England, is opened.
- October 12, 1847 – German inventor and industrialist Werner von Siemens founds Siemens & Halske.
- February 2, 1848 – John Henry Newman founds the first Oratory in the English-speaking world when he establishes the Birmingham Oratory at 'Maryvale', Old Oscott, England.

==== Africa ====
- 1845 – Eugénie Luce founds the Luce Ben Aben School in Algiers.

==== North America ====
- 1843 – Saint Louis University School of Law becomes the first law school west of the Mississippi River.
- January 15, 1844 – The University of Notre Dame receives its charter from Indiana.
- February 1, 1845 – Anson Jones, President of the Republic of Texas, signs the charter officially creating Baylor University. Baylor is the oldest university in the State of Texas operating under its original name.
- October 10, 1845 – In Annapolis, Maryland, the Naval School (later renamed the United States Naval Academy) opens with fifty midshipmen and seven professors.
- November 1, 1848 – In Boston, Massachusetts, the first medical school for women, The Boston Female Medical School (which later merges with Boston University School of Medicine), opens.
- November 1849 – Austin College receives a charter in Huntsville, Texas.

=== Other ===
- 1841- Dallas Texas was settled on this year.
- February 4, 1841 – First known reference to Groundhog Day, in the diary of a James Morris.
