= Eugène Maizan =

French Naval lieutenant and explorer (1816–1845)

- Born: September 28, 1816; Montauban
- Died: July 1845 (aged 28–29); Dege la Mhora
- Military career
- Allegiance: Kingdom of France
- Branch: French Navy
- Rank: Lieutenant (enseigne de vaisseau)

Eugène Maizan (28 September 1816 in Montauban – July 1845) was a French Naval lieutenant and explorer, possibly the first European to penetrate East Africa and the first to enter tropical Africa from Zanzibar. In 1844-1845 Maizan reached as far as the district of Dege la Mhora, on the Uzaramo plateau about 80-150 kilometers from the coast, where he was seized by Zaramo tribesmen under Hembé, the son of Chief Mazungera, and bound to a calabash tree before being tortured, mutilated and murdered. Hembé amputated Maizan's limbs and sliced off his genitals while still alive before beheading him. Hembé later claimed to be acting on the orders of Arab ivory traders.

== Expedition in tropical Africa ==
=== Preparation ===
Maizan studied at the École Polytechnique. He was appointed to the rank of lieutenant (enseigne de vaisseau) by order of King Louis Philippe I on 1 January 1840.

Upon returning from a campaign made in the waters of East Africa, in late 1843 Maizan conceived the project to explore the lakes of the East African interior, journeying from east to west from Zanzibar. The campaign took place in 1843 aboard the corvette La Dordogne under the command of Captain Charles Guillain.

In 1844, once his mission was accepted by the relevant ministries, Eugène Maizan went to Bourbon, where he boarded the corvette Berceau commanded by Captain Joseph Romain-Desfossés. This ship went to Zanzibar to sign a treaty with Said bin Sultan, Sultan of Muscat and Oman, and install the new Consul, M. Broquant.

Initially, the plan was to begin the exploration of tropical Africa from Zanzibar. Maizan's program was to journey to Lake Chad, then try to find the source of the White Nile. He would then, after passing the Niger, return to Europe through the Sahara. The Société Orientale de France (Oriental Society of France), of which he was a member, had given him a few questions that he should strive to answer during his journey.

=== History ===
Maizan landed on Zanzibar Island at the end of 1844. He spent more than eight months at the Sultanate of Zanzibar in order to learn Kisawahili, during which he changed his plans and regularly increased his baggage. Maizan ultimately left the island in haste, having seen a French vessel entering the harbor and fearing that he would be recalled. He had visited the coast three times before finally landing. The Banians (who had strong commercial interests in the region) feared that the French were occupying the region, and Maizan was wrongly believed to have been sent to prepare for the arrival of the French troops. They probably used their influence to push Maizan to leave the island quickly. The Sultan offered Maizan an armed guard of forty musketeers, but Maizan declined in his haste to depart.

The explorer left Zanzibar on 21 April 1845 and made landfall in Bagamoyo (opposite Zanzibar). He then traveled to Dege la Mhora, accompanied only by Frédérique, a man from Madagascar or the Comoros, and a few other followers. Initially, Maizan had planned to take a caravan of merchants' ivory, but changed his mind given the amount of baggage. During his journey, he was warned that P'hazi Mazungera (or Mzŭngéra), the chief of the Wakamba subtribe of the Wazaramo, wanted him. To better prepare for their journey and learn about what to expect in the land, the expedition spent a few days on the coast. Maizan then decided to make a big detour to avoid the territories of the bloodthirsty leader who seemed to have bad intentions towards him.

After two days of walking (to cover in a direct line a distance equal to three days of travel), Maizan stopped in the village of Daguétamohor. It was from this village that he sent a letter to the consul of France based in Zanzibar (M. Broquant did not receive the letter until 10 August 1845), asking him to send his baggage. He entrusted this task to a servant who betrayed him and gave the location of Maizan's camp to Mazungera. The African leader came upon the French at the end of July 1845 at the village of Dege la Mhora. Maizan was initially taken in by Mazungera's false hospitality. After a few days, Mazungera accused Maizan of giving gifts to other chiefs. Frédérique was saved by Mazungera's wife, but Maizan apparently did not have the presence of mind to touch her. Manzugera, falsely believing that Maizan was carrying treasure, tortured him to find out where it was hidden. His arms were bound around a pole to which his legs and head were secured with rope. Manzugera's son Hembé cut off Maizan's limbs and genitals, then cut his throat and beheaded him, interrupting the throat-cutting to sharpen the knife in front of Maizan before killing him.

Frédérique subsequently disappeared from Zanzibar, and reportedly fled to Marungu on Lake Tanganyika. The French consul arranged to collect the material left by the unfortunate explorer.

=== After the expedition ===
Ordered to judge Mazungera under the French laws, the Naval Division Commander of Bourbon and Madagascar, Joseph Romain-Desfossés, made several requests to the Sultan of Muscat and Oman to capture the criminal. Not having achieved anything, Joseph Romain-Desfossés charged Charles Guillain (who then started to explore the eastern coast of Africa) to remind the Sultan of his commitment to deliver the murderer to the French authorities.

The Sultan sent an army of 300-400 musketeers after Mazungera, but they discovered that he had fled. Hembé led his father's tribe into a few days of skirmishes against the Zanzibaris. The man who had beaten the drum during Maizan's killing was taken into custody and put in chains at Zanzibar, where he eventually died. Hembé later told John Hanning Speke that he had killed Maizan on his father's orders. Because Mazungera held a title conferred by the Sultan, Speke, who was favorably disposed toward Africans, blamed Maizan's death on the urging of Arabs who did not want Europeans interfering with the ivory trade. Speke assumed that Hembé would have been killed if he had disobeyed. Famed explorer Richard Francis Burton would later comment that the Wazaramo had greatly declined in power and importance since Maizan's death, and that "few murders have been more pregnant in their consequences than that of M. Maizan in East Africa."
