= History of steamship lines =

The shipping company is an outcome of the development of the steamship. In former days, when the packet ship was the mode of conveyance, combinations, such as the well-known Dramatic and Black Ball lines, existed but the ships which they ran were not necessarily owned by the organizers of the services. The advent of the steamship changed all that.

== Development ==
In 1815 the first steamships began to ply between the British ports of Liverpool and Glasgow. In 1826 the United Kingdom, a leviathan steamship, as she was considered at the time of her construction, was built for the London and Edinburgh trade, steamship facilities in the coasting trade being naturally of much greater relative importance in the days before railways. In 1823 the City of Dublin Steam Packet Company was inaugurated, though it was not incorporated until ten years later. The year 1824 saw the incorporation of the General Steam Navigation Company, which was intended not only to provide services in British waters, but also to develop trade with the continent. The St George Steam Navigation Company and the British and Irish Steam Packet Company soon followed. The former was crushed in the keen competition which ensued, but it did a great work in the development of ocean travel. Isolated voyages by vessels fitted with steam engines had been made by the Savannah from the United States in 1819, and by the first Royal William from Canada in 1833, and the desirability of seriously attacking the problem of ocean navigation was apparent to shipping men in the three great British ports of London, Liverpool and Bristol.

Three companies were almost simultaneously organized: the British and American Steam Navigation Company, which made the Thames its headquarters; the Atlantic Steamship Company of Liverpool and the Great Western Steamship Company of Bristol. Each company set to work to build a wooden paddle steamer in its own port. The first to be launched was the Great Western, which took the water in the Avon on 19 July 1837. On 14 October following, the Liverpool was launched by Messrs Humble, Milcrest & Co., in the port from which she was named, and in May 1838 the Thames-built British Queen was successfully floated. The Great Western was the first to be made ready for sea.

== Improvements ==
Constant improvement has been the watchword of the shipowner and the shipbuilder, and every decade has seen the ships of its predecessor become obsolete. The mixed paddle and screw leviathan, the Great Eastern, built in the late 1850s, was so obviously before her time by some fifty years, and was so under-powered for her size, that she may be left out of our reckoning. Thus, to speak roughly, the 1850s saw the iron screw replacing the wooden paddle steamer; the later 1860s brought the compound engine, which effected so great an economy in fuel that the steamship, previously the conveyance of mails and passengers, began to compete with the sailing vessel in the carriage of cargo for long voyages; the 1870s brought better accommodation for the passenger, with the midship saloon, improved staterooms, and covered access to smoke-rooms and ladies' cabins.

The early 1880s saw steel replacing iron as the material for shipbuilding and before the close of that decade the introduction of the twin-screw rendered breakdowns at sea more remote than they had previously been, at the same time giving increased safety in another direction, from the fact that the duplication of machinery facilitated further subdivision of hulls. Now the masts of the huge liners in vogue were no longer useful for their primary purposes, and degenerated first into derrick props and finally into mere signal poles, while the introduction of boat decks gave more shelter to the promenades of the passengers and removed the navigators from the distractions of the social side. The provision of train-to-boat facilities at Liverpool and Southampton in the 1890s did away with the inconveniences of the tender and the cab.

The introduction of the turbine engine at the beginning of the 20th century gave further subdivision of machinery and increase of economy, whereby greater speed became possible and comfort was increased by the reduction of vibration. At the same time the introduction of submarine bell signaling tended to diminish the risk of stranding and collision, while wireless telegraphy not only destroyed the isolation of the sea but tended to safety, as was seen by the way in which assistance was called out of the fog when the White Star Line liner Republic was sinking as the result of a collision off Martha's Vineyard (1909).

Tank steamers were constructed for the carriage of oil in bulk. Many of these ships were adapted not only for the carriage of oil, but also for its consumption in their furnaces in place of coal. The experience of many years has enabled the owners of some of these lines to exhibit a wonderfully low record of loss, the percentage of deaths at sea to numbers carried being small beyond the dreams of, say, the 1870s. A tenth of 1% over a somewhat extended period is not an unprecedented average.

== Sources ==
The following books throw much light on the history of the leading steamship lines:

- History of Merchant Shipping, by W. S. Lindsay (London, Sampson Low & Co.)
- La Navig. comm. au XIX. siècle (Paris, 1901)
- A. J. Maginnis, The Atlantic Ferry (3rd ed., London, Whittaker & Co.)
- E. R. Jones, The Shipping World Year-Book; Lloyds Register of British and Foreign Shipping (published annually).
