= SS American =

SS American may refer to:

- SS American (1895), built by Harland and Wolff for the West India & Pacific Steam Navigation Co in 1895
- SS American (1900), one of the first ships of the American-Hawaiian Steamship Company; served in World War I as USS American (ID-2292); accidentally rammed and sank USS West Gate (ID-3216) in October 1918; renamed Honolulan in 1925 and scrapped in 1926 in Japan
- SS American (1916), the former SS Santa Barbara of Grace Steamship Company; served as USS Santa Barbara (ID-4522) during and after World War I; sold to American-Hawaiian Steamship Company in 1925 and renamed American; sunk off Honduras by U-504 in June 1942

== See also ==
- USS American
- SS America
- USS America
