= SS President =

British passenger liner

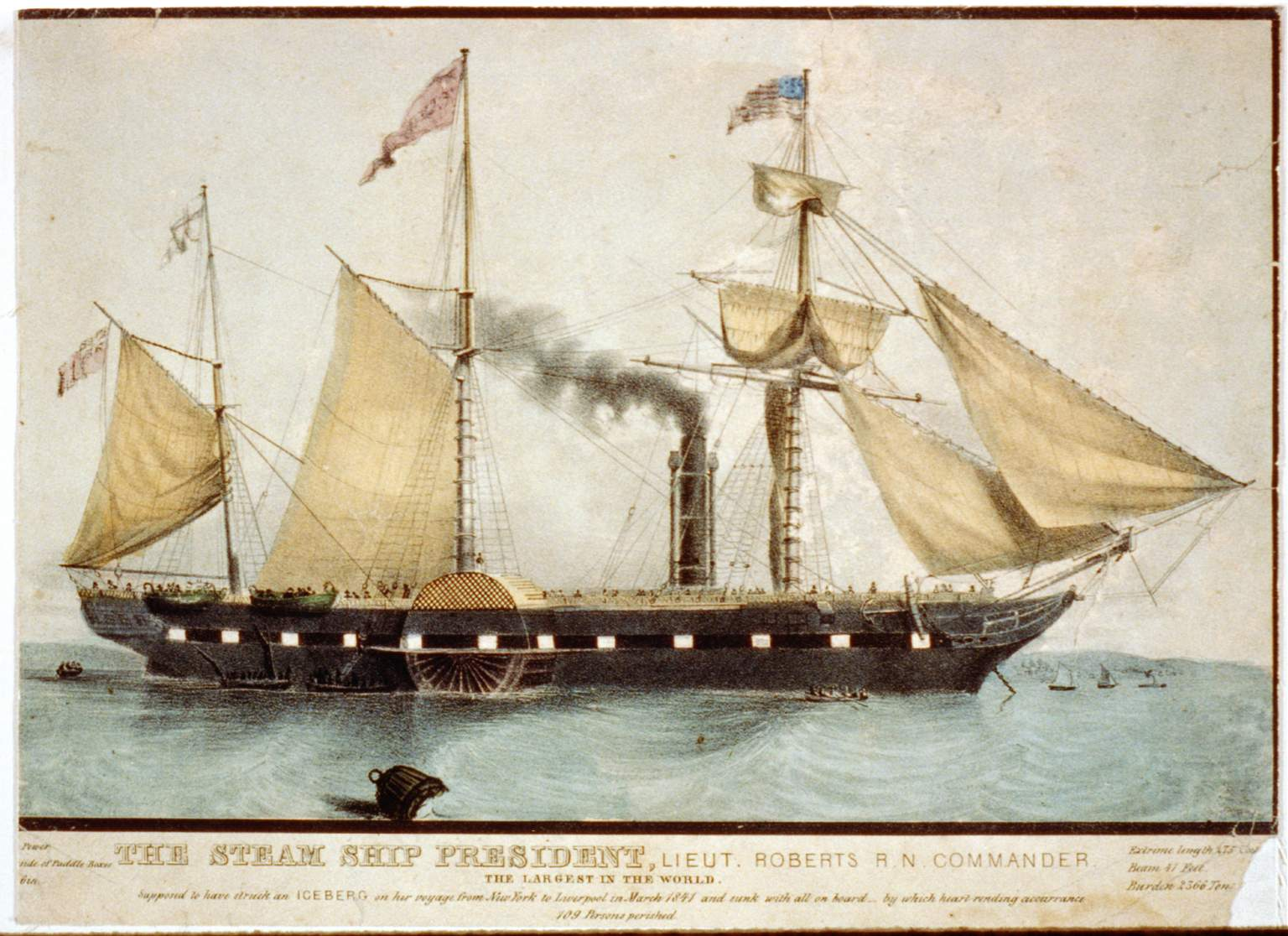

History
- Owner: British and American Steam Navigation Company
- Port of registry: United Kingdom
- Route: Atlantic crossing
- Builder: London, Curling & Young
- Laid down: November 23 1838
- Launched: December 9 1839
- Maiden voyage: 1 August 1840
- Out of service: March 1841
- Fate: March 1841, lost with all aboard under unknown circumstances

General characteristics
- Tonnage: 2,350 GRT
- Length: 243 ft (74 m)
- Beam: 41 ft (12 m)
- Sail plan: 3 masts

SS President was a British passenger liner that was the largest ship in the world when she was commissioned in 1840, and the first steamship to founder on the transatlantic run when she was lost at sea with all 136 on board in March 1841. She was the largest passenger ship in the world from 1840 to 1841. The ship's owner, the British and American Steam Navigation Company, collapsed as a result of the disappearance.

President was the second liner owned by British and American and was noted for her luxurious interiors. Designed by Macgregor Laird and built by Curling and Young of London, she was fitted for 154 passengers. President was over 25% larger than the British Queen, the previous holder of the size record, and over twice the size of Cunard's Britannia Class, the first three of which were also commissioned in 1840. This was accomplished by adding a third deck to the design of the British Queen. As a result, President was top-heavy and rolled excessively. She was also underpowered and had the slowest passage times of any transatlantic steamer up to that point. To avoid litigation, changes were made to her paddle wheels after her second round trip that further complicated her lack of power, especially in rough weather.

On 11 March 1841, President cleared New York bound for Liverpool on her third eastbound voyage. She was overloaded with cargo to compensate for her roll. President was last seen the next day struggling in a gale. Her disappearance was major news for several months and even Queen Victoria followed the story.

== Development and design ==
British and American recognized from the beginning that frequent sailings were required and that the line needed a fleet of steamers for its new transatlantic service. As soon as the line's first unit, British Queen was delivered, British and American ordered the President. The plan was that by 1840, either President or British Queen was to depart each month for New York.

As designed by Macgregor Laird, President was 500 GRT larger than British Queen, then the largest ship. Her opulent interiors were in sharp contrast to the more reserved accommodations of Cunard's fleet. Great American wanted passengers to feel they were in a luxury hotel rather than at sea. The saloon measured 80 feet by 34 feet and was in Tudor Gothic style. The corridor aft to the regular staterooms was a picture gallery, with ten oil paintings depicting scenes about Christopher Columbus. The regular staterooms could accommodate 110 passengers and another 44 forward in Servants cabins. The two-berth regular cabins were seven feet by seven feet. Her exterior decoration included a figurehead of George Washington.

President's wooden hull was subdivided into watertight compartments. However, it was not as robust as Great Western or the new Cunard vessels just entering service. After just two round trip voyages, she required refit after stormy seas weakened and twisted her hull. President was top-heavy and rolled excessively because she was constructed with a third deck on top of a hull with almost the same waterline dimensions as British Queen.

Relative to her size, President was significantly less powerful than her rivals. As a result, her 1840 voyage times were disappointing. This problem was compounded in 1841 when President's paddle wheels were modified with non-feathering paddles. Tests in 1830 demonstrated that feathering paddles improved speed by 25% in smooth water and over 50% in rough seas. British American failed to secure the rights to use the patented design and removed the feathering paddles before President left on her first 1841 voyage in order to avoid litigation.

== Service history ==
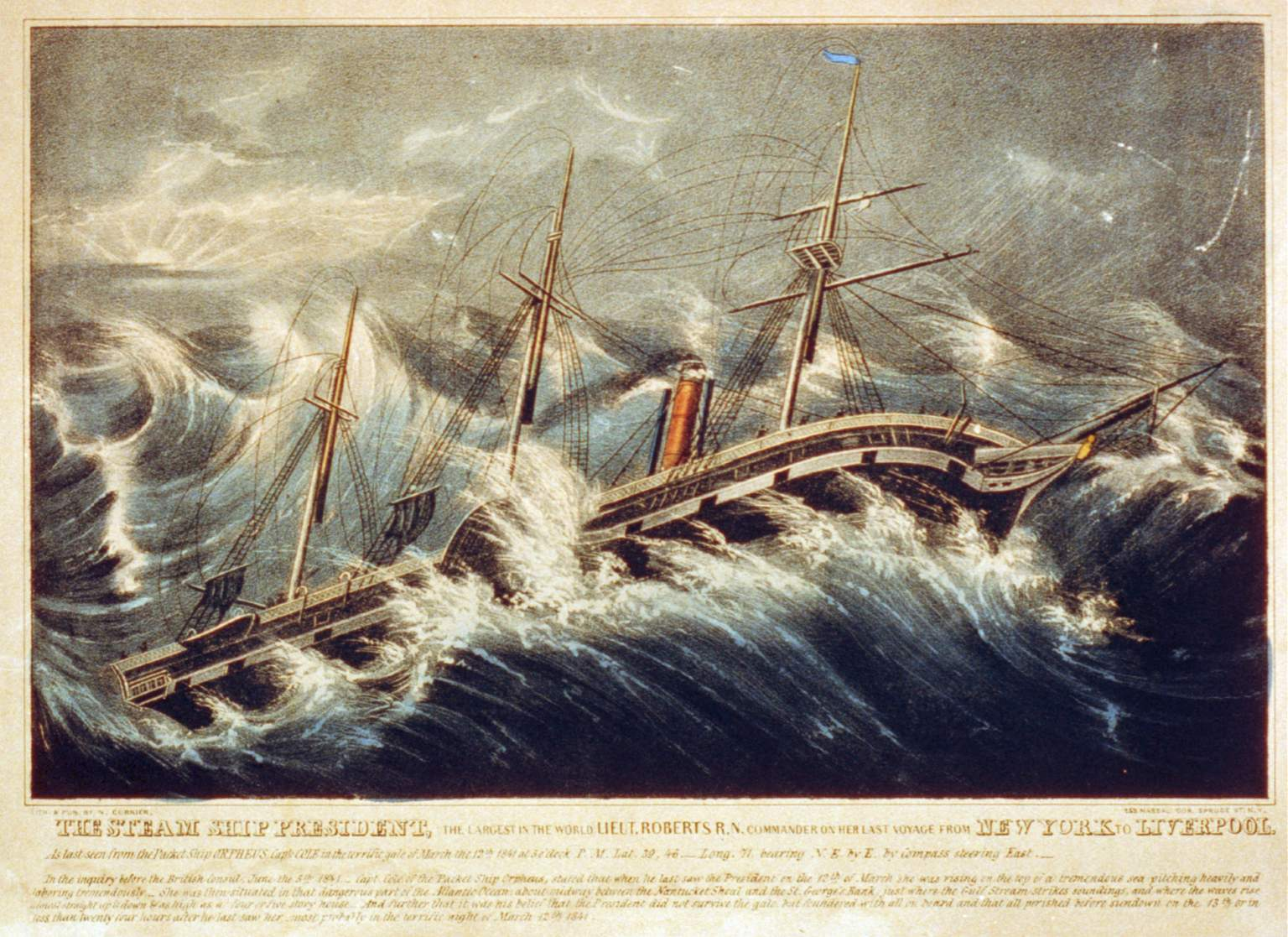
The last sighting of the SS President in a gale

President's maiden voyage in August 1840 lasted 16.5 days and averaged only 8.4 knots (15.6 km/h) as compared to the then record of 9.52 knots (17.63 km/h) posted by Great Western. Under the command of Robert J. Fayrer, President left the Mersey with few passengers because both Great Western and Cunard's Acadia sailed the previous week. Her return trip also averaged only 8.4 knots (15.6 km/h) as compared to Great Western's eastbound record of 10.17 knots (18.83 km/h). The President's captain was blamed for the poor performance and replaced by Michael Macarthy Keane. However, her times were no better on her second round trip. Leaving New York City, President was only able to complete 300 miles in four days and returned to the Hudson to refuel. Upon arrival in Liverpool, her December voyage was cancelled and she was refitted. Again her captain was replaced.

Departing Liverpool in February, under Captain Richard Roberts, President's third westbound voyage to New York lasted 21 days. She sailed for her return voyage on 11 March 1841 with 136 passengers and crew along with an extensive cargo manifest. President encountered a gale and was seen on her second day out labouring in heavy seas in the dangerous area between Nantucket Shoals and Georges Bank. She was not seen again. Among the passengers was the Rev. George Grimston Cookman, who had served as Chaplain of the Senate, and the popular Irish comic actor Tyrone Power, who was the great-grandfather of the film star of the same name. The late ship deathwatch stretched out for months. Queen Victoria asked that a special messenger be sent to her if there was news about the ship.

The caption of the color print showing the ship in the storm reads as follows: "THE STEAM SHIP PRESIDENT, the largest in the world, LIEUT. ROBERTS, R.N. Commander of her last voyage from NEW YORK to LIVERPOOL. As last seen from the Packet Ship ORPHEUS, Capt.COLE, in the terrific gale of March the 12th 1841 at 3 o'clock P.M. Lat. 39, 46___Long. 71 bearing N.E. by E. by compass bearing East.___"

"In the inquiry before the British Consul on June the 5th 1841___Capt. Cole of the Packet Ship Orpheus, stated that when he last saw the President she was rising on the top of a tremendous sea pitching heavily and laboring tremendously___She was then situated in that dangerous part of the Atlantic Ocean about midway between the Nantucket Shoal and the St. George's Bank, just where the Gulf Stream strikes soundings, and where the waves rise about straight up and down & as high as a four or five story house___And further that it was his belief that the President did not survive the gale, but foundered with all on board and that all perished before sundown on the 13th or in less than twenty four hours after he last saw her, most probably in the terrible night of March 12th 1841."

== See also ==
- List of ocean liners
