= French ship America =

Two ships of the French Navy have borne the name America, honouring the links between France and the United States of America:

- French ship America (1782)
- French ship America (1788)

== See also ==
- HMS America
- SS America
- USS America
- Vestale bore the name Flore américaine ("American Flora") to distinguish her from Flore.

== Sources ==
- L’America, premier vaisseau de la marine américaine, Nicolas Mioque
