= Richard Roberts (sea captain) =

Irish sea captain

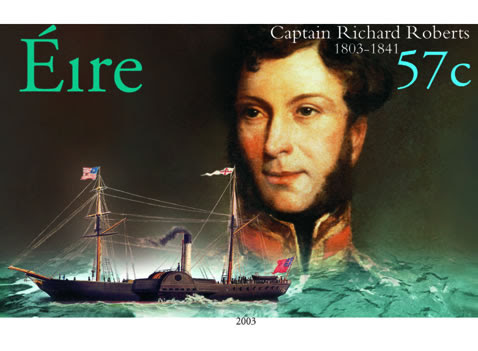
- Richard Roberts and The Sirius.
- Born: 1803; Ireland
- Died: March 1841 (age 37-38); Atlantic Ocean; at sea
- Resting place: Atlantic Ocean
- Other names: Lieutenant Roberts; Captain Dick Roberts
- Occupation: Mariner
- Years active: ?-1841

SS President, Roberts's final command and the one in which he lost his life.

Richard Roberts (1803–1841) RN also known as Dick Roberts was an Irish sea captain, from Ardmore, County Waterford. He entered the Royal Navy in his youth and served with them until he gained the rank of Lieutenant, and was given command of the SS Sirius. With Roberts at the helm, the Sirius became the first steamship to travel across the Atlantic to America, in April 1838. Shortly afterwards, he was transferred to the SS President, which was lost at sea in March 1841. Roberts is presumed to have gone down with the ship. Actor Tyrone Power, great-grandfather of the Hollywood movie star, was also a passenger and perished in the President.

Roberts loved the sea so, that he's quoted as saying "..I'd go to sea in a bath tub".

== See also ==
- The captain goes down with the ship
- Tyrone Power
