= HMS America =

Six ships of the Royal Navy have borne the name HMS America:

- English ship America (1650) was an armed merchantman in naval service between 1650 and 1654.
- HMS America (1748) was a 44-gun fifth rate launched in 1748. She was renamed HMS Boston in 1756 and was sold in 1757.
- HMS America (1757) was a 60-gun fourth rate ship of the line launched in 1757, and broken up in 1771.
- HMS America (1777) was a 64-gun third rate ship of the line launched in 1777. She was stranded in 1800, salvaged and became a prison ship. She was lent to the Transport Board in 1804 and was broken up in 1807.
- HMS America (1794) was a 74-gun third rate, previously the French America. She was captured in 1794 and renamed HMS Impetueux in 1795. She was broken up in 1813.
- HMS America (1810) was a 74-gun third rate ship of the line launched in 1810, and broken up in 1867.

== See also ==
- French ship America, two ships of the French Navy
- USS America
- SS America
- America-class steamship
  - RMS America
