= Great Western Steamship Company =

Transatlantic shipping company

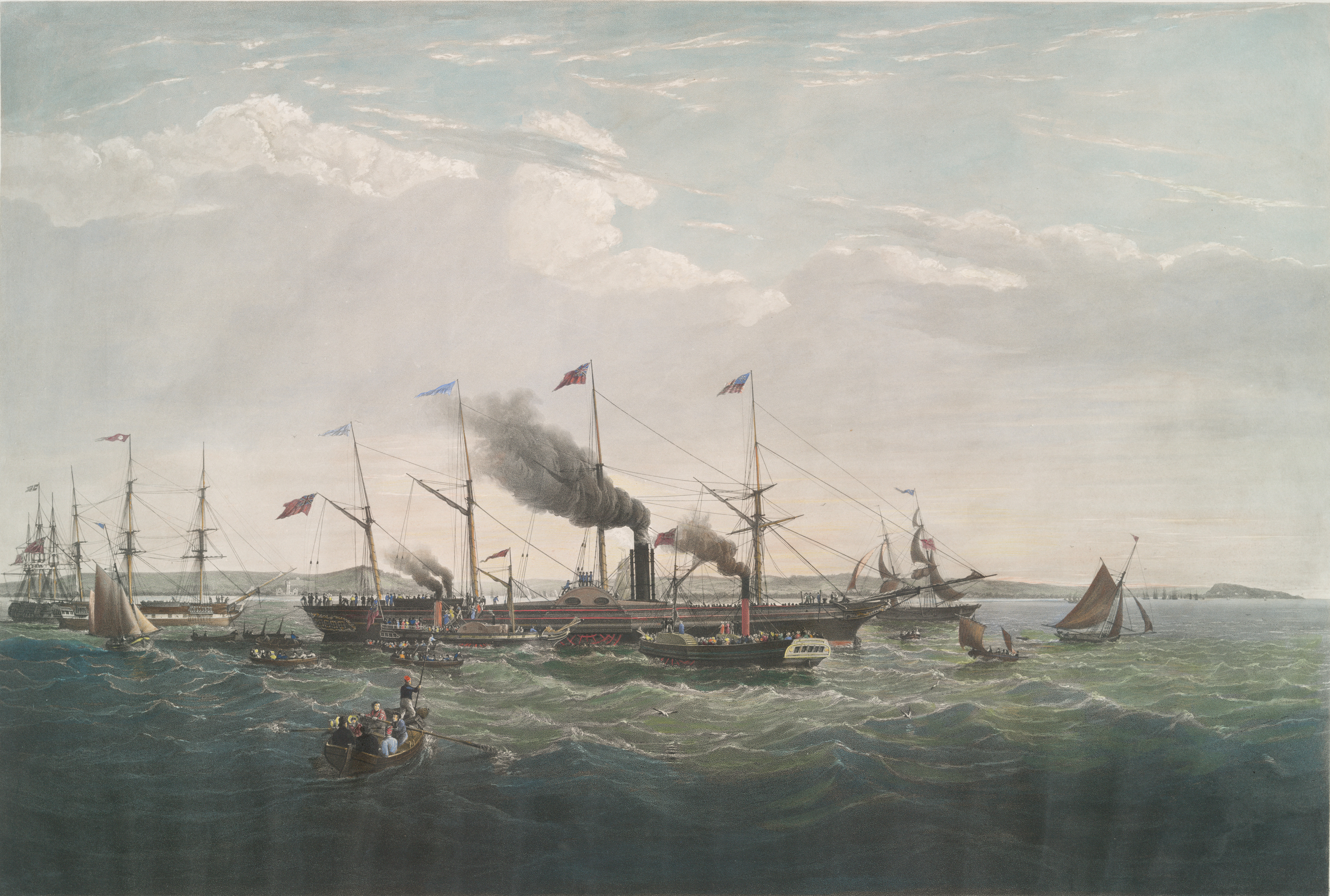
Great Western on her maiden voyage.

The Great Western Steam Ship Company operated the first regular transatlantic steamer service from 1838 until 1846. Related to the Great Western Railway, it was expected to achieve the position that was ultimately secured by the Cunard Line. The firm's first ship, Great Western was capable of record Blue Riband crossings as late as 1843 and was the model for Cunard's Britannia and her three sisters. The company's second steamer, the Great Britain was an outstanding technical achievement of the age. The company collapsed because it failed to secure a mail contract and Great Britain appeared to be a total loss after running aground. The company might have had a more successful outcome had it built sister ships for Great Western instead of investing in the too advanced Great Britain.

== History ==
By the 1830s, Liverpool was overtaking Bristol as a transatlantic port. The Great Western Railway was formed in 1833 to build a Bristol-London line and appointed Isambard Kingdom Brunel as chief engineer. The issue of the line's length was discussed at an 1835 director's meeting when supposedly Brunel joked that the line could be made longer by building a steamship to run between Bristol and New York. The necessary investors were recruited by Brunel's friend, Thomas Guppy, a Bristol engineer and businessman. The next year, the Great Western Steam Ship Company was established, even though the rail line was still years from completion.

Construction on the Brunel designed Great Western was started in June 1836 at William Patterson's shipyard. Her large size (1,350 GRT) sparked controversy when Dionysius Lardner spoke to the British Association for the Advancement of Science and concluded that the largest practical ship for a transatlantic service was 800 GRT, which was too small for a direct New York service. Brunel argued that larger ships were more efficient and was ultimately proved correct. However, Lardner's conclusions scared away some potential Bristol investors and the new firm was undersubscribed.

Great Western was launched in July 1837 and ready for her maiden Bristol-New York voyage the following April. The British and American Steam Navigation Company was also planning a transatlantic steamship service, but its first unit, the British Queen, was not ready when Great Western scheduled its initial sailing. To beat its rival, British and American chartered the Irish Sea steamer, the 700 GRT Sirius from the St. George Steam Packet Company for two voyages. While Sirius left Cork, Ireland four days before Great Western departed Avonmouth, Great Western still came within a day of overtaking Sirius to New York. To complete the voyage, Sirius was forced to burn spars when coal ran low. Because British and American did not begin its regular service until the following year, the Great Western Steam Ship Company is considered the first regular transatlantic steamship service.

Great Western proved clearly superior to British Queen and was the model for every successful Atlantic wooden paddle-wheeler. During 1838–1840, Great Western averaged 16 days, 0 hours (7.95 knots) westward to New York and 13 days, 9 hours (9.55 knots) home. In 1838, the company paid a 9% dividend, but that was to be the firm's only dividend because of the expense of building the company's next ship.

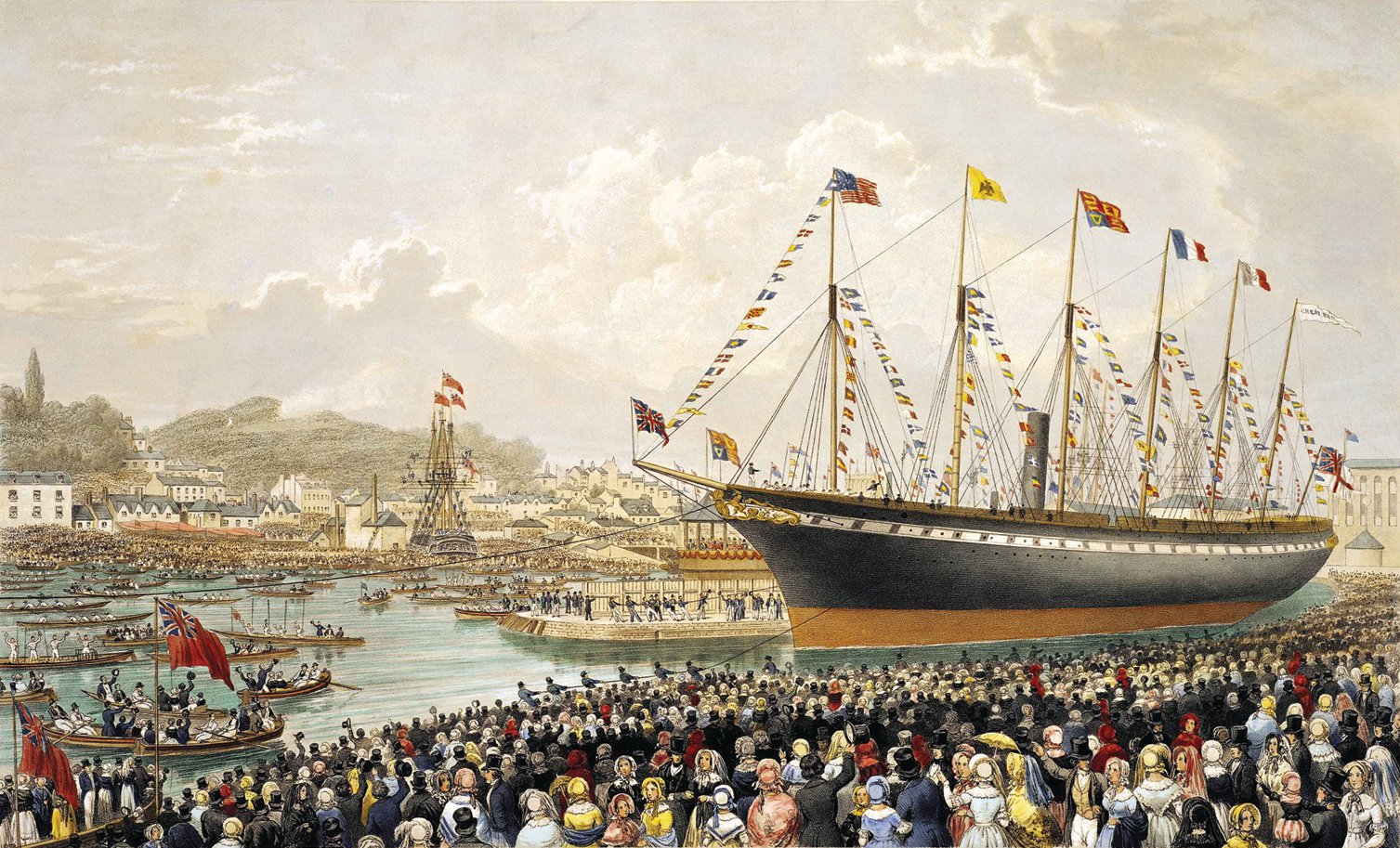
The 1843 launch of Great Britain, the revolutionary ship of Isambard Kingdom Brunel

Unfortunately, the events in 1839 doomed the company. Materials were already collected to build a second ship, tentatively named City of New York when Brunel convinced the directors to build an entirely different ship, an iron-hulled steamer of unusually large dimensions. Construction of Great Britain proved disastrously protracted and expensive, and for the next six years Great Western operated alone.

Even more disastrous was the British Government's decision to award the transatlantic mail contract to Samuel Cunard. Three years earlier, a Committee of Parliament decided that mail packets managed by the Post Office should be replaced by contracts with private shipping companies and that the Admiralty should assume responsibility. Famed Arctic explorer, Admiral Sir William Edward Parry was appointed as Comptroller of Steam Machinery and Packet Service in April 1837. Nova Scotians led by their young Assembly Speaker, Joseph Howe lobbied for steam service to Halifax. The Rebellions of 1837 were still ongoing and London realized that the proposed Halifax service was also important for defence reasons.

That November, Parry released a tender for North Atlantic mail service to Halifax. Great Western bid £45,000 for a monthly Bristol-Halifax-New York service to begin in 18 to 24 months. The St. George Steam Packet Company also bid £45,000 for a monthly Cork-Halifax service including their Sirius and £65,000 for a monthly Cork-Halifax-New York service. Great Western's directors were confident that they would win the contract because of the demonstrated success of their first steamer. However, the Admiralty rejected both bids because neither company offered to begin service early enough. Guppy was also in disfavor at the Admiralty because of his critical remarks about the Royal Navy's steamship designs made at an 1837 scientific meeting.

Cunard, who was back in Halifax, did not even know of the tender until after the original deadline. Cunard returned to London and started negotiations with Admiral Parry, who was Cunard's good friend from the time Parry was a young officer stationed in Halifax twenty years earlier. Cunard offered Parry a fortnightly service beginning by May 1840. While Cunard did not currently own a steamship, he had been involved in an earlier steamship venture (Royal William) and owned coal mines in Nova Scotia. Cunard's major backer was Robert Napier, who was the Royal Navy's supplier of steam engines. Napier was eager to support Cunard because he just had a falling out with Junius Smith of British and American. Cunard also had the strong backing of Nova Scotian political leaders such as Howe at the time when London was concerned about building support in British North America after the rebellion. In May 1839, Admiral Parry accepted Cunard's tender over the loud protests of Great Western's directors. Parliament investigated Great Western's complaints, and upheld the Admiralty's decision.

The company also faced difficulties at its home port. The water was not deep enough for Great Western to dock at Avonmouth, forcing the ship to anchor midstream. The Docks Company refused to dredge a deeper berth and charged twice the rate as Liverpool. The result was that Bristol lost further ground to it rival ports. After the collapse of British and American, Great Western decided to alternate departures between Avonmouth and Liverpool, before abandoning Avonmouth entirely in 1843. The company remained profitable even though it now competed directly against Cunard's fortnightly service. In 1843, the firm's receipts were £33,400 against expenditures of £25,600. However, the company was still financially stressed because of the cost of building Great Britain, which ultimately reached £117,295.

In 1843, Great Britain was finally launched with great fanfare. She was no less than three times the size of Cunard's Britannia Class. The company's fortunes improved in 1845 when Great Britain entered service. She recorded 14 days, 21 hours (9.3 knots) to New York and a day less on her return. However, on 23 September 1846 Great Britain ran ashore because of a navigational error and was not expected to survive the winter. The directors suspended all sailings of Great Western and went out of business. The company was forced to sell the salvage rights at a fraction of Great Britain's original cost Great Britain was saved, sold and served various owners until 1937.

== Great Western fleet ==
List sourced from

Ship	Launched	In service for Great Western	Type	Tonnage GRT	Notes and references
Great Western	1837	1838–1846	Wood-Paddler	1,350	Blue Riband, sold 1847 to the Royal Mail Steam Packet Company and scrapped 1856
Great Britain	1843	1845–1846	Iron-Screw	3,450	Sold 1850 and ultimately transferred to the Australian trade, now preserved in Bristol
