= Macgregor Laird =

Scottish explorer (1808–1861)

- Born: 1808; Greenock, Scotland
- Died: January 9, 1861 (aged 52–53); London, England
- Education: University of Edinburgh
- Known for: shipbuilding, exploring, trading
- Spouse: Eleanor Hester Nicolls (m. 1837)
- Father: William Laird

Macgregor Laird (1808 – 9 January 1861) was a Scottish merchant pioneer of British trade on the River Niger. Laird's commercial expedition between 1832 and 1834 to navigate the Niger and initiate trade between Europeans and Africans northwards of the coast was considered a failure: the majority of the passengers died and the volume of trade realized was minimal. However, his experience provided information about the design of vessels suitable on the Niger and the various settlements in the interior of the Niger Delta.

Laird never returned to Africa but instead devoted himself to the development of trade with West Africa and especially to the opening up of the countries then forming the British protectorates of Nigeria. One of his principal reasons for so doing was his belief that this method was the best means of stopping the slave trade and raising the social condition of Africans.

== Early life ==
Laird was born at Greenock, the younger son of Agnes and William Laird, founder of the Birkenhead firm of shipbuilders of that name.

His paternal grandfather, John Laird, was a merchant and rope maker in Greenock while his maternal grandfather, Gregor Macgregor, had commanded a ship that undertook voyages between Greenock and the West Indies. Laird's brother, John was himself a notable shipbuilder. Laird was educated at Edinburgh University.

In 1829, while at the university, he fell ill, caused by typhus infection. He was helped to recovery by Dr Thomas Briggs, who later accompanied Laird in the expedition to the Niger.

After graduation, Laird joined the family business in Birkenhead, where he developed an interest in building steamships.

== Career ==
=== Niger voyage ===
In the early 1830s, Richard Lander, an associate of Hugh Clapperton, was provided a subsidy to return to Africa and find the course of the Niger. Following Lander's report of reaching the river mouth, enthusiasm for an exploratory team to West Africa grew. The report also rekindled interest in merchants looking for new markets.

In 1831, after the lower course of the Niger had been made known by Lander and his brother John, Laird and some Liverpool merchants formed the African Inland Commercial Company to commercially develop the region.

Laird worked on the designs of the ships to navigate the Niger. Although the primary aim was to foster trade with the interior communities, Laird also had a personal objective of implementing Christian and humanitarian ideals.

In 1832, the company sent two small ships and a brig to the Niger. The initial plan of the expedition was to set up the brig at the River Nun, a Niger tributary with history of trade with Europeans, and two paddle vessels to navigate northwards and establish a trading post at Lokoja. The Alburkah was a paddle-wheel steamer of fifty-five tons designed by Laird, and was the first iron vessel to make an ocean voyage. The Quorra, carrying 29 men, was made of wood; it measured 112 feet in length, with a beam of 16 feet and a draft of eight feet.

Laird was among 48 European voyagers on the expedition, which was led by Richard Lander. All but nine died from fever or, in the case of Lander, from wounds. Although two doctors came along, quinine was rarely used to treat fever that became more pronounced as they made their ascent up the river; instead, miasma was thought the main contributory reason for an epidemic of fever. Laird went up the Niger to the confluence of the Benue River (then called the Shary or Tchadda), which he was the first white man to ascend. He did not go far up the river but formed an accurate idea as to its source and course.

Laird was weakened by fever and had to return to Fernando Po, where he was received by Colonel Edward Nicolls, the British Governor there, who later became his father-in-law. He rested in Fernando Po before returning to England. Laird and Surgeon R.A.K. Oldfield were the only surviving officers besides Captain (then Lieutenant) William Allen, who accompanied the expedition on the orders of the Admiralty to survey the river.

In 1837, Laird and Oldfield published the Narrative of an Expedition into the Interior of Africa by the River Niger in 1832, 1833, 1834.

=== British and North American Steam Navigation Company ===
Laird was not interested only in Africa. In 1837 he was one of the promoters of a company formed to run steamships between England and New York, and in 1838 the Sirius, sent out by this company, was the first ship to cross the Atlantic from Europe entirely under steam.

Between 1835 and 1841, Laird was involved with the British and American Steam Navigation Company. The firm launched a vessel, the British Queen, that provided a mail service between England and America, but this venture was unprofitable. It then added another vessel, the President, which disappeared en route to England from New York. The company did not survive the disappearance of the President, and the navigation firm was liquidated in 1841.

Despite the unsuccessful expedition, Laird continued to stimulate interest in promoting commercial trade in the hinterland of West Africa, particularly within the settlements closest to the mouth of the Niger. He advised merchants to cultivate trade with coastal middlemen as a primary business objective, and as a secondary objective, to send a steam vessel inland to woo communities in the interior and bypass the coastal middlemen.

In 1841, when the British blockade of the coast of West Africa failed to halt the transatlantic slave trade, Laird's belief in legitimate trade as a deterrent to slave trading gave way to the idea that cheap labour through unrestricted emigration to the West Indies would cripple the demand for slaves while also increasing production of sugar. In 1838, after the apprenticeship system in West Indies was eliminated ending slavery, Laird advocated voluntary emigration of Africans to West Indies as a way to curtail slavery and also bring Africans in contact to Europeans and their culture. He expressed these views to a parliamentary select committee on the West Coast of Africa in 1842 and to the General Anti-Slavery Convention in 1843.

=== Return to West African trade: the African Steam Navigation Company ===
Laird never went back to West Africa. However, upon renewed government interest in the affairs of West Africa after the appointment of John Beecroft as consul in the Oil Rivers and the 1851 annexation of Lagos, Laird submitted a proposal to the government for regular mail communication by steamship between England and West Africa. The proposal found favour with the government and he was given a mail contract including government subsidies. In 1852, he co-founded the African Steam Navigation Company. In 1854, he set up, with the government's support, a small steamer, the Pleiad. Under W. B. Baikie, the ship made a successful voyage which enabled Laird to convince the government to sign contracts for annual trading trips by steamers specially built for navigation of the Niger and Benue. Various stations were founded on the Niger, and though government support was withdrawn after the death of Laird and Baikie, British traders continued to frequent the river, which Laird had opened up to little or no personal advantage.

== Personal life ==
In 1837, Laird married Colonel Edward Nicolls' daughter, Eleanor Hester Nicolls (1811–1898).

Macgregor Laird died in London on 9 January 1861.

== Bibliography ==
- Tanner, Margaret Louise (1978). MacGregor Laird: the five percent failure (M. A.). University of Western Ontario.
