= USS American =

Two ships of the United States Navy have been named American.

- USS American (1861), part of the Stone Fleet sunk at Charleston, South Carolina. Some references to this ship name it as the America
- USS American (ID-2292), was a freighter built in 1900 and acquired by the US Navy early in 1918 and returned to her original owners in 1919

== See also ==
- USS America
