= SS Great Western =

Oak-hulled paddle-wheel steamship

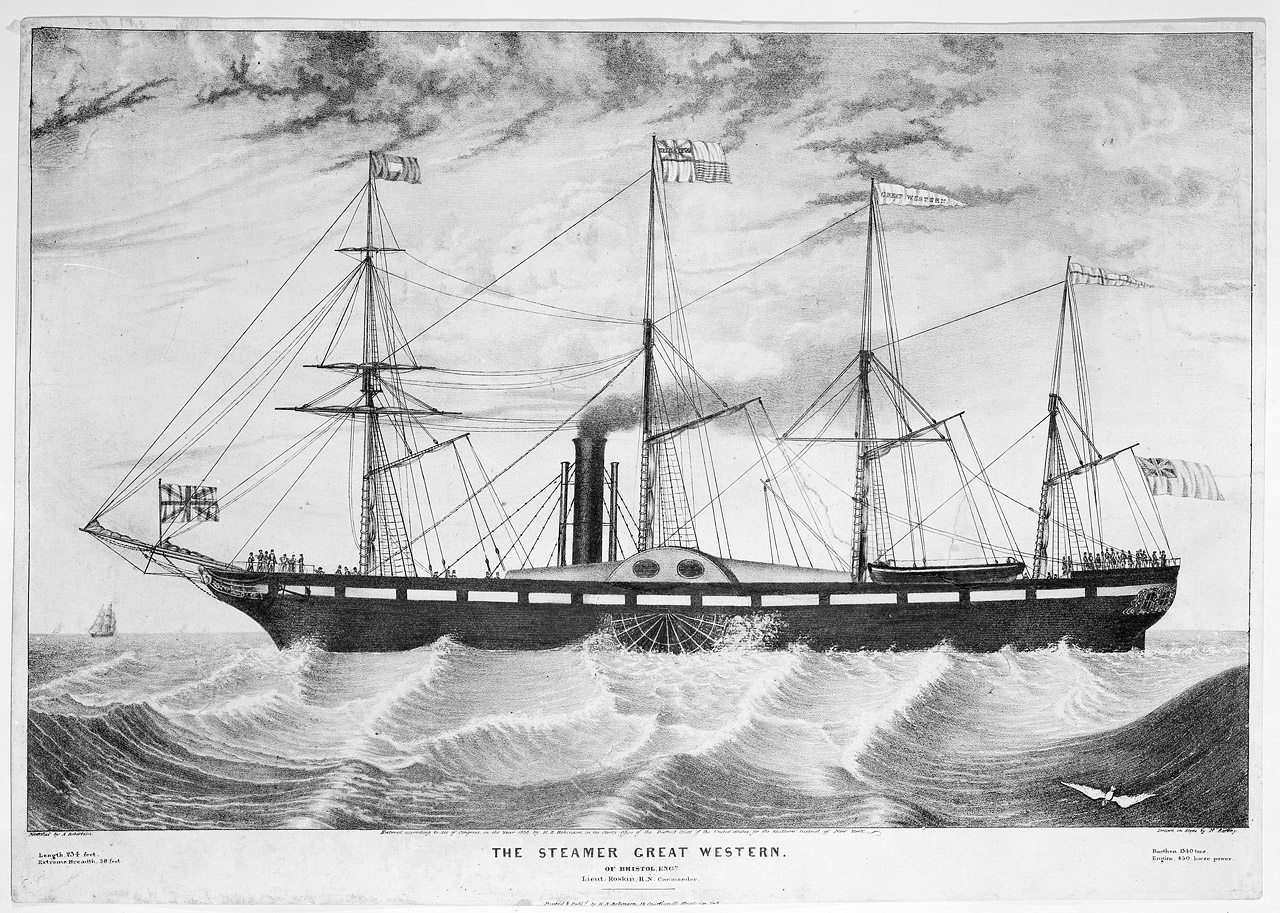
- SS Great Western in 1838

History

United Kingdom
- Name: Great Western
- Namesake: Great Western Railway
- Operator: Great Western Steamship Company
- Route: Bristol – New York
- Builder: William Patterson, Bristol, England
- Laid down: 26 June 1836
- Launched: 19 July 1837
- Completed: 31 March 1838
- Maiden voyage: 8 April 1838; Bristol-New York
- Out of service: December 1846 in Liverpool
- Notes: 1839–40: Rebuilt for more passengers.; 45 Atlantic round trips before being taken out of service
- Operator: Royal Mail Steam Packet Company
- Acquired: 24 April 1847
- Fate: Scrapped, 1856
- Notes: Transatlantic mail service Southampton – West Indies
- Operator: British Government
- Acquired: 1855
- Fate: Scrapped October 1856
- Notes: Operated as troop transport in the Crimean War

General characteristics
- Type: Oak-hulled paddle-wheel steamship
- Tonnage: 1,700 GRT
- Displacement: 2300 ton
- Length: 71.6 m (234 ft 11 in), later 76.8 m (252 ft 0 in) long
- Beam: 17.59 m (57 ft 9 in) across wheels
- Installed power: 73 1/2 diameter 2-cylinder Maudslay steam engine; 7ft stroke, 12-15 rpm side lever engines; 750 hp (560 kW)
- Propulsion: Two paddle-wheels
- Speed: 8.5 knots
- Capacity: 128 passengers in 1st class + 20 servants
- Crew: 60

SS Great Western was a wooden-hulled paddle-wheel steamship with four masts, the first steamship purpose-built for crossing the Atlantic, and the initial unit of the Great Western Steamship Company. Completed in 1838, she was the largest passenger ship in the world from 1837 to 1839, the year SS British Queen went into service.

Designed by British civil engineer Isambard Kingdom Brunel, Great Western proved satisfactory in service and was the model for all successful wooden Atlantic paddle-steamers. She was capable of making record Blue Riband voyages as late as 1843. Great Western worked to New York for eight years until her owners went out of business. She was sold to the Royal Mail Steam Packet Company and was scrapped in 1856 after serving as a troopship during the Crimean War.

== Development and design ==
In 1836, Isambard Kingdom Brunel, his friend Thomas Guppy and a group of Bristol investors formed the Great Western Steamship Company to build a line of steamships for the Bristol–New York route. The idea of regular scheduled transatlantic service was under discussion by several groups and the rival British and American Steam Navigation Company was established at the same time. Great Western's design sparked controversy from critics that contended that she was too big. The principle that Brunel understood was that the carrying capacity of a ship increases as the cube of its dimensions, whilst the water resistance only increases as the square of its dimensions. This meant that large ships were more fuel efficient, something very important for long voyages across the Atlantic.

Great Western was an iron-strapped, wooden, side-wheel paddle steamer, with four masts to hoist the auxiliary sails. The sails were not just to provide auxiliary propulsion, but also were used in rough seas to keep the ship on an even keel and ensure that both paddle wheels remained in the water, driving the ship in a straight line. The hull was built of oak (one source says Dantzic pine, presumably meaning Baltic pine from Danzig) by traditional methods. She was the largest steamship for one year, until the British and American's British Queen went into service. Built at the shipyard of Patterson & Mercer in Bristol, England, Great Western was launched on 19 July 1837. During the launch, a shipwright was killed when a large baulk of timber fell on him, fracturing his skull. After her launch, Great Western sailed to London, where she was fitted with two side-lever steam engines from the firm of Maudslay, Sons and Field, producing 750 indicated horsepower between them. Towards the end of 1837 Lieutenant James Hosken was appointed commander of the new vessel and in March 1838 the first advertisements of sailings were made.

== Service history ==
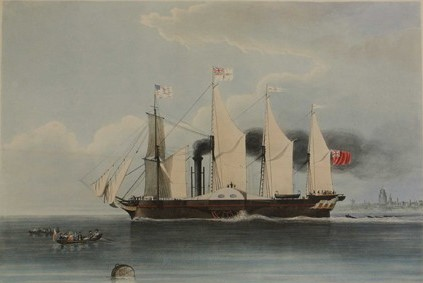
The Great Western Steam Ship in 1838, engraved by H. Papprill after a painting by J. S. Coteman

The first trial of the Great Western took place on 24 March 1838, attracting a vast audience with visits by the nobility on the ship's return. On 31 March, Great Western sailed for Avonmouth (Bristol) to start her maiden voyage to New York. Before reaching Avonmouth, a fire broke out in the engine room. During the confusion Brunel fell 20 feet (6 m), and was injured. The fire was extinguished, and the damage to the ship was minimal, but Brunel had to be put ashore at Canvey Island. As a result of the accident, more than 50 passengers cancelled their bookings for the Bristol-New York voyage and when Great Western finally departed Avonmouth, only seven passengers were aboard.

Construction of the rival British and American's first ship was delayed, and the company chartered SS Sirius to beat Great Western to New York. Sirius was a 700 GRT Irish Sea steam packet on the London – Cork route, and had part of her passenger accommodation removed to make room for extra coal bunkers. She left London three days before Great Western, refuelled at Cork, and departed for New York on 4 April. Great Western was delayed in Bristol because of the fire and did not depart until 8 April.

Even with a four-day head start, Sirius only narrowly beat Great Western, arriving on 22 April. When coal ran low, the crew burned five drums of resin. Great Western arrived the following day, with 200 tons of coal still aboard. Although the term Blue Riband was not coined until years later, Sirius is often credited as the first winner at 8.03 knots (14.87 km/h). Great Western's broke the record the next day, averaging 8.66 knots (16.04 km/h).

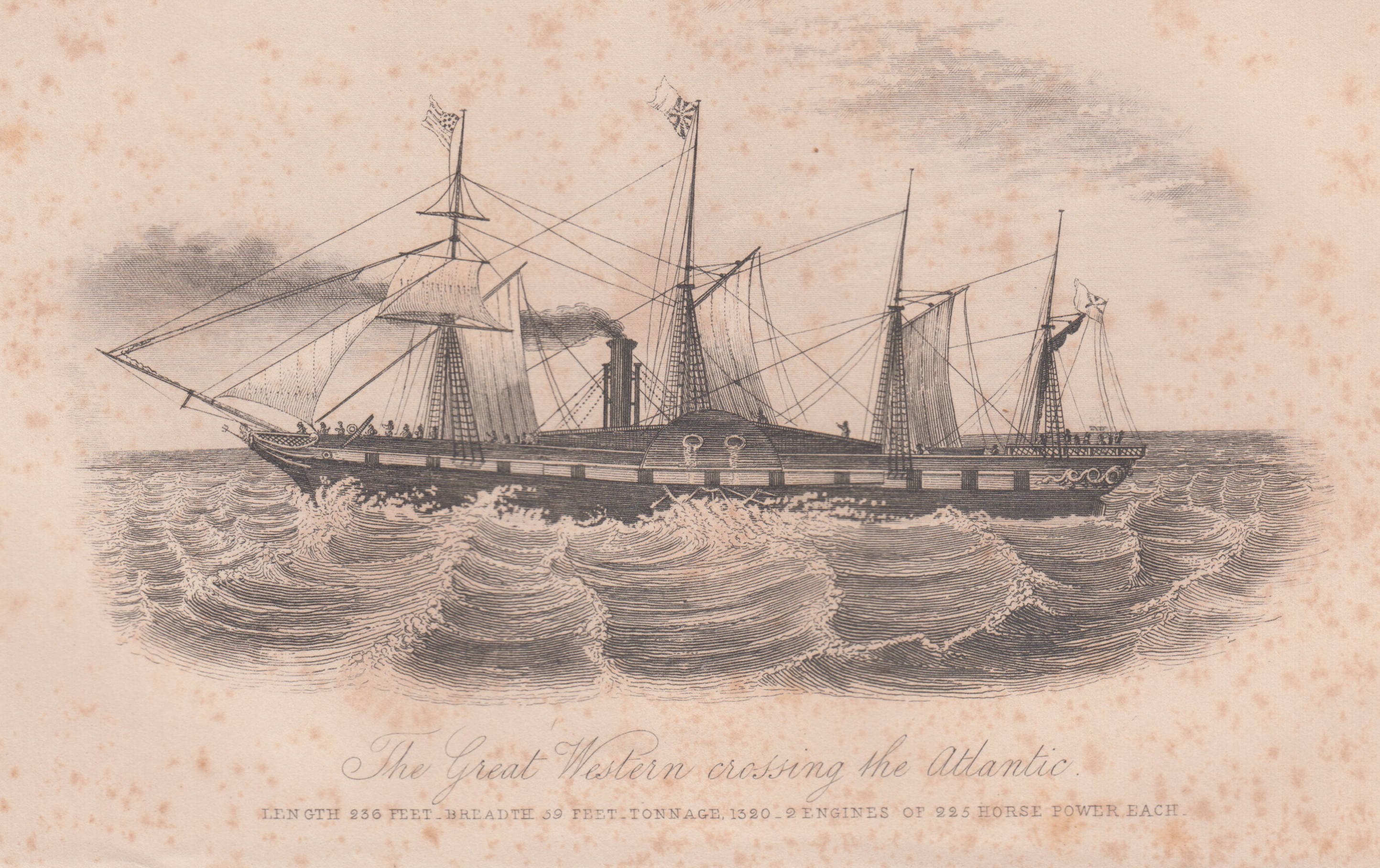
The Great Western crossing the Atlantic

Great Western proved completely satisfactory in service and influenced the design of other Atlantic paddlers. Even Cunard's Britannia was a reduced version of Great Western. During 1838–1840, Great Western averaged 16 days, 0 hours (7.95 knots) westward to New York and 13 days, 9 hours (9.55 knots) home. In 1838, the company paid a 9% dividend, but that was to be the firm's only dividend because of the expense of building the company's next ship. After the collapse of British and American, Great Western alternated between Avonmouth and Liverpool, before abandoning Avonmouth entirely in 1843. The ship remained profitable even though she lacked a running mate because of the protracted construction on Great Britain. In 1843, Great Western's receipts were £33,400 against expenditures of £25,600.

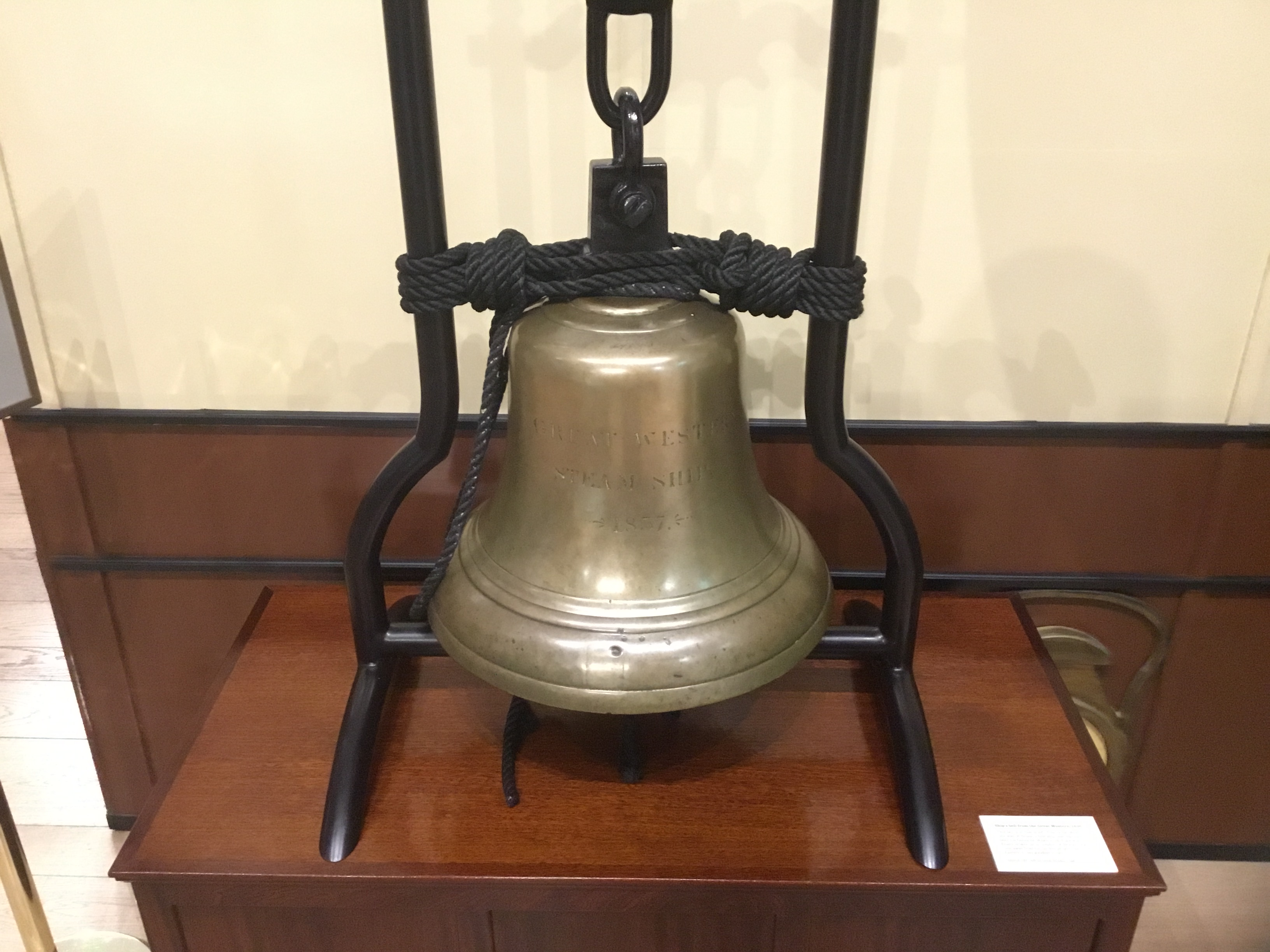
Bell of SS Great Western on display at the Being Brunel Museum, Brunel's SS Great Britain

The company's fortunes improved in 1845 when Great Britain entered service. However, in September 1846, Great Britain ran ashore because of a navigational error and was not expected to survive the winter. The directors suspended all sailings of Great Western and went out of business. Great Western had completed 45 crossings for her owners in 8 years. In 1847 she was sold to the Royal Mail Steam Packet Company and used on the West Indies run. Southampton became her new home port from where she made 14 voyages to the West Indies between 1847 and 1853, before being put on the South America run and made another nine voyages to Rio de Janeiro between 1853 and 1855. In February 1853, she towed the American medium clipper Flying Arrow in to Saint Thomas, Virgin Islands. Flying Arrow had been dismasted on 24 January and had lost all her boats. On the South America run she called at Lisbon, Madeira, Teneriffe, St Vincents, Pernambuco and Bahia on the way to Rio and then in reverse on the return passage.

The Great Western was then laid up at Southampton before being taken into government service as Transport No. 6. She served as a troopship in the Crimean War in 1856, carrying soldiers between the UK, Gibraltar, Malta, and the Crimean Peninsula. In August 1856 she was sold for scrapping and was broken up at Castles' Yard, Millbank on the Thames.

== See also ==
- List of longest wooden ships
- SS Great Eastern

Records
Preceded by Sirius	Holder of the Blue Riband (Westbound record); 1838–1841	Succeeded by Columbia
Preceded by Sirius	Blue Riband (Eastbound record); 1838–1840	Succeeded by Britannia
Preceded by Britannia	Blue Riband (Eastbound record); 1842–1843	Succeeded by Columbia
Preceded by Columbia	Blue Riband (Westbound record); 1843–1845	Succeeded by Cambria
