= USS America =

USS America may refer to:

- USS America (1782), a 74-gun ship of the line, laid down in 1777, but not launched until 1782 and thereupon given to France
- USS America (IX-41), a 19th-century racing yacht converted for United States naval service during the American Civil War
- USS America (ID-3006), originally the German ocean liner SS Amerika, seized by the United States during World War I and used as a troop transport
- USS America (CV-66), a Kitty Hawk-class aircraft carrier commissioned in 1965 and decommissioned in 1996. Currently the only supercarrier to be expended as a target.
- USS America (LHA-6), an America-class amphibious assault ship awarded for construction in June 2007 and commissioned in 2014

== See also ==
- USS American (1861), part of the Civil War "Stone Fleet" deliberately sunk to block the harbor in Charleston, South Carolina; sometimes erroneously referred to as USS America
- America, an ocean liner launched in 1939
- SS America, various merchantmen
- America was the name of the Command Module on Apollo 17
- French ship America, two ships of the French Navy
- HMS America, various ships of the Royal Navy
- America-class steamship
  - RMS America
- America-class ship of the line
- USS United States
