= SS America =

SS America may refer to:

- SS America (1863), a passenger steamer for North German Lloyd, 1863–1894
- SS America (1869), a passenger steamer for Pacific Mail Steamship Company
- SS America (1874), a cargo ship that was in Chilean service in 1928, formerly known as the George W. Elder.
- SS America (1883), a passenger cargo vessel by J & G Thomson of Clydebank, launched 29 December 1893, later used by the Italian Navy as Trinacria and as a Royal Yacht, scrapped 1925.
- SS America (1891), a sailing barque (painted by William H. Yorke).
- SS America (1898), a passenger and package steamer serving Duluth, Minnesota, Thunder Bay, Ontario, and Isle Royale.
- SS America (1905), originally the Hamburg America Line liner Amerika seized by the United States in 1917; served as a troop transport in World War I; transferred to the United States Shipping Board; eventually assigned to United States Lines
- SS America (1908), an Italian liner for Navigazione Generale Italiana in Italy–New York service; transported American troops during World War I; in South American service, from 1924; scrapped 1928
- SS America (1914), a cargo steamer for Norge Mexico Gulf Linjen; sunk by torpedo in 1915
- SS America (1939), an ocean liner of the United States Lines, launched 1939; sold to the Greek company Chandris Group in 1964; wrecked 1994

== See also ==
- America (disambiguation)
- America (yacht), winner of the first America's Cup
- French ship America (1788)
- USS America
- HMS America
- America-class steamship
  - RMS America
- SS Amerika
- SS America Transport
