= British and American Steam Navigation Company =

British steamship line (1832–1841)

The British and American Steam Navigation Company was a steamship line that operated a regular transatlantic service from 1839 to 1841. Before its first purpose-built Atlantic liner, British Queen was completed, British and American chartered Sirius for two voyages in 1838 to beat the Great Western Steamship Company into service. B & A's regular liners were larger than their rivals, but were underpowered. The company collapsed when its second vessel, President was lost in 1841.

== History ==
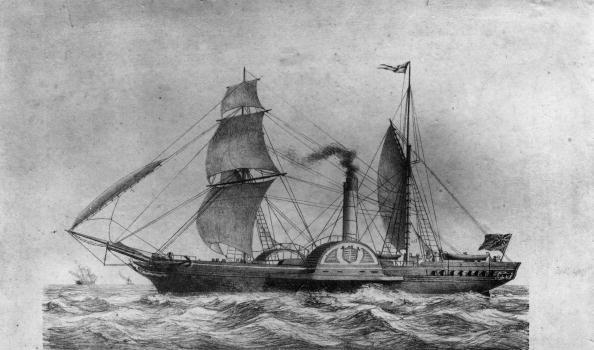
Sirius (700 GRT) was chartered for British and American's first two voyages in 1838.

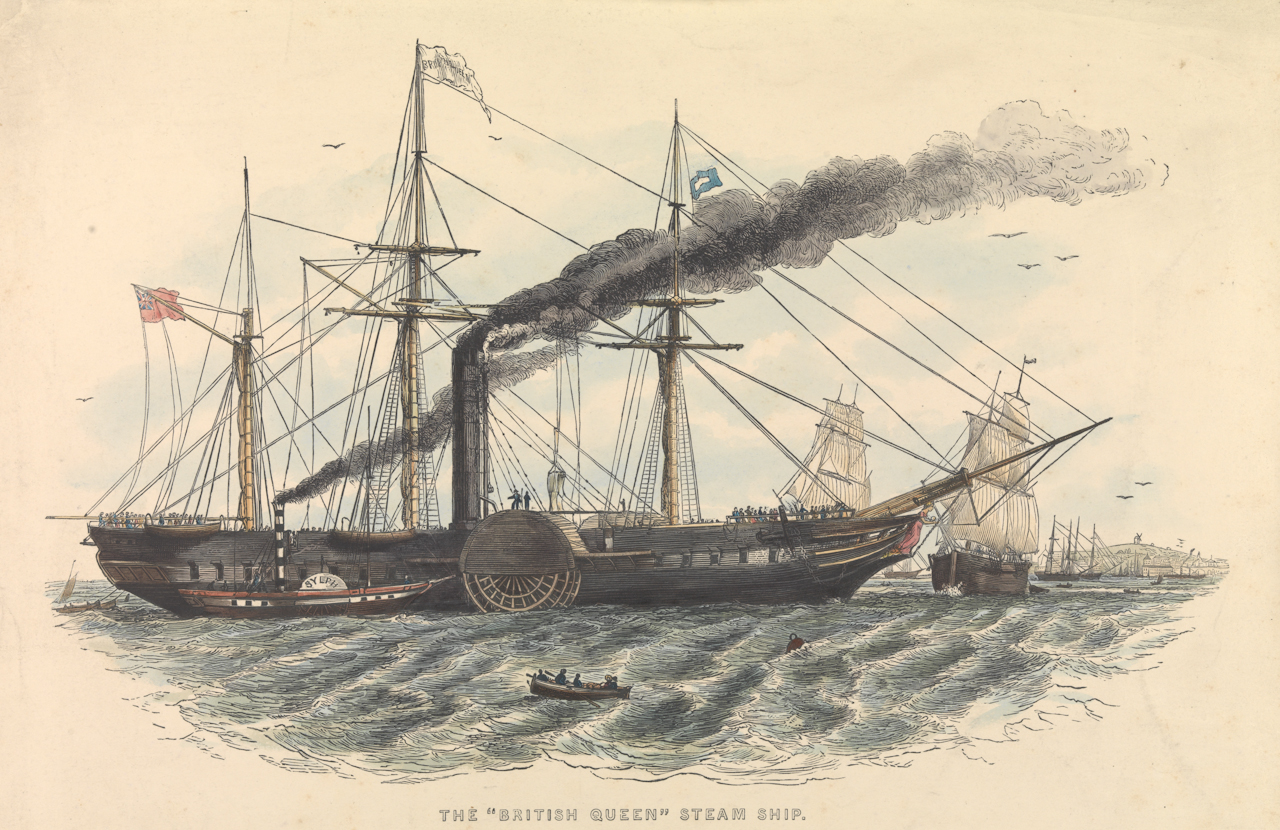
British Queen

President

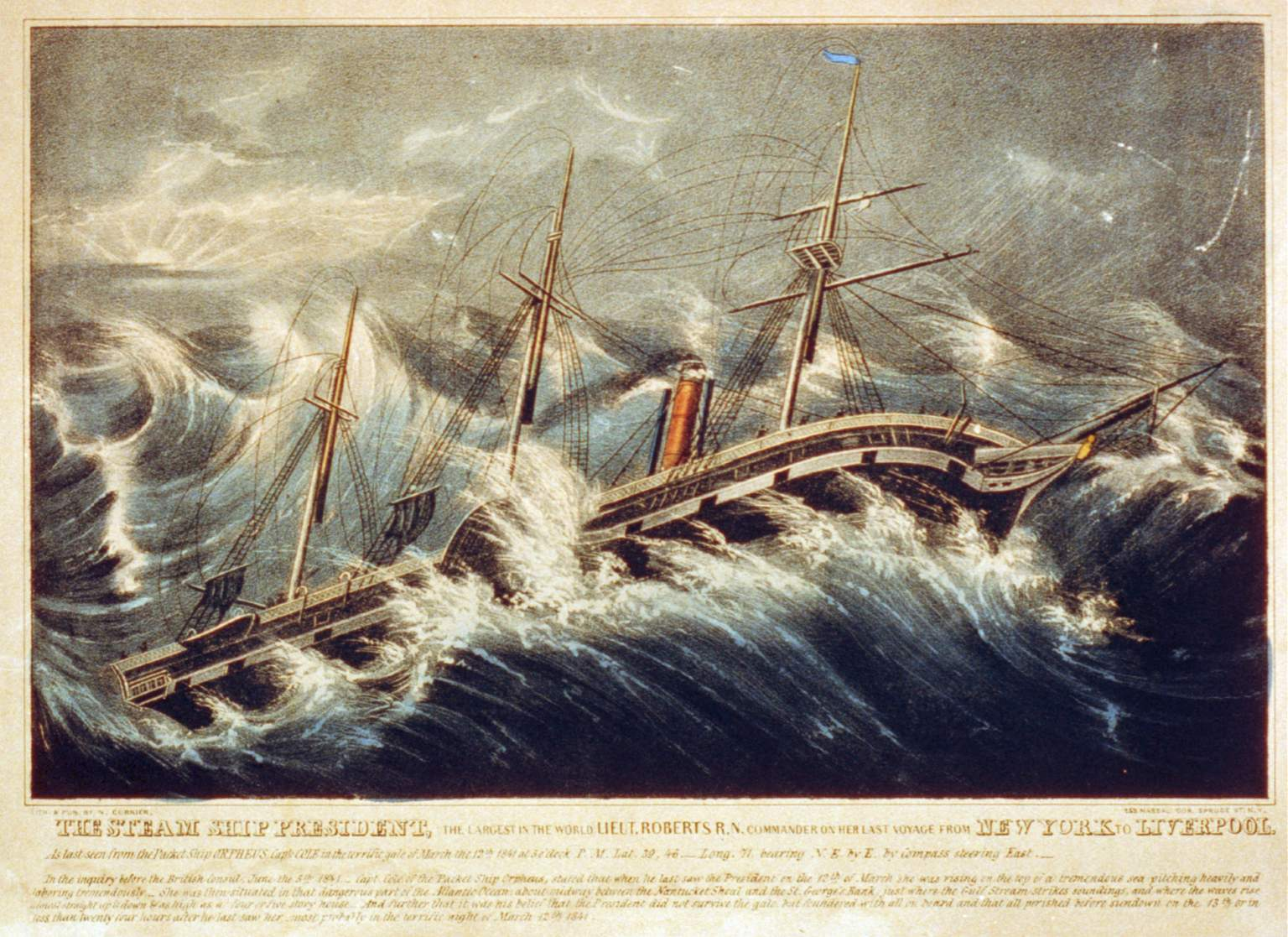
The loss of President (2350 GRT) in 1841 forced British and American to collapse.

British and American was founded by American lawyer Junius Smith (1780–1853), who is often considered the "Father of the Atlantic Liner". Smith had been a merchant in London for 30 years when in 1832 he became stuck on a sailing packet to New York for 54 days. The normal westbound passage was 40 days. Before he returned to London, he published the idea of building a line of transatlantic steamships in a November 1832 issue of the American Rail Road Journal.

His plan called for a four-ship London-New York service with fortnightly departures in each direction. Two of the ships were to be owned by an American company, and the other two by a sister British firm. He received no support for several years and the American company never materialized. Finally the venture gained credibility when the Scottish shipbuilder Macgregor Laird became an investor. A new prospectus was published in The Times in November 1835.

The design for the company's first unit, British Queen was finished after the details of the Great Western's first ship became known. Rather than build the four 1,200 GRT units as planned in the prospectus, British and American decided to make its first ship substantially bigger. The Scottish engineer, Robert Napier was originally designated to build British Queen's engine, but the contract was awarded to another firm that underbid Napier's price. Unfortunately, this other firm collapsed and Napier was finally given the contract. The delay cost British and American a critical 18 months while work on Great Western continued. Smith accused Napier of dragging his feet while he completed other contracts for the British and Russian Governments. The two had a falling out and Napier became the major early backer of Cunard.

When Great Western scheduled its initial sailing, Laird suggested that British and American charter the Irish Sea steamer Sirius from the St. George Steam Packet Company for two voyages to beat Great Western. While Sirius left Cork, Ireland four days before Great Western departed Avonmouth, Great Western still came within a day of overtaking Sirius to New York. It was rumoured that to complete the voyage, Sirius was forced to burn spars when coal ran low. Because British and American did not begin its regular service until the following year, the Great Western Steam Ship Company is considered the first regular transatlantic steamship line.

In 1839, British Queen finally entered service and was roomier and more comfortable than her rivals. The company earned a 5.5% dividend that year. British and American immediately ordered a consort, President, which was double the size of Cunard's Britannia of the same year. From the beginning, President departed from Liverpool, instead of London. In 1841, both ships worked from Liverpool, with one steamer scheduled to depart on the 10th of each month.

In service, British Queen and later President proved underpowered and too lightly built for the Atlantic. Power became even more inadequate when the patented feathering paddles had to be removed from both units because British American did not have the consent of the patent holder William Pool. President cleared New York in March 1841 and was seen the next day struggling in a gale. Most sources conclude that her lack of power and top-heavy design contributed to her loss with all hands. The company collapsed and the remaining ship was sold to the Belgian Government.

== British and American fleet ==
List sourced from

Ship	Built	In service for B & A	Type	Tonnage	Notes
Sirius	1837	1838	wood-paddler	700 GRT	Blue Riband, chartered from St. George Steam Packet Company for two voyages
British Queen	1839	1839–41	wood-paddler	1,850 GRT	sold to Belgian Government 1841
President	1840	1840–41	wood-paddler	2,350 GRT	lost with all hands 1841
