= SS Sirius (1837) =

1837 wooden-hulled sidewheel steamship

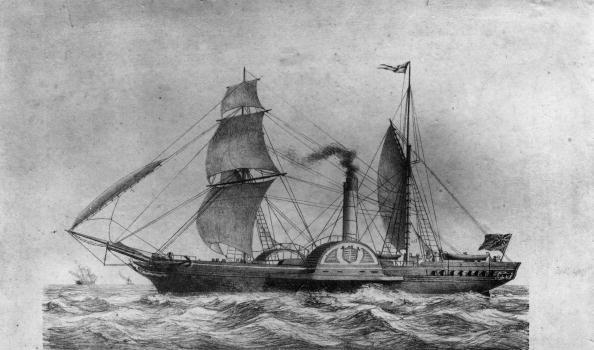

History

United Kingdom
- Name: Sirius
- Operator: Saint George Steam Packet Co, Cork, Ireland
- Builder: Robert Menzies & Sons, Leith, Scotland
- In service: 1837
- Fate: Wrecked and sunk off Ballycotton, Ireland, 16 January 1847

General characteristics
- Type: Paddle steamer
- Tonnage: 703 GRT
- Displacement: 1,995 tons
- Length: 178 ft 4 in (54.4 m)
- Beam: 25 ft 8 in (7.8 m)
- Draught: 15 ft (4.6 m)
- Depth: 18 ft 3 in (5.6 m)
- Installed power: 500 ihp (370 kW)
- Propulsion: Two side-wheels; 1 × 2-cylinder side-lever steam engine
- Speed: 12 knots (22 km/h; 14 mph)
- Range: 2,897 nmi (5,365 km; 3,334 mi) at 6.7 knots (12.4 km/h; 7.7 mph)
- Capacity: 40 passengers
- Crew: 36

SS Sirius was a wooden-hulled sidewheel steamship built in 1836 by Robert Menzies & Sons of Leith, Scotland for the London-Cork route operated by the Saint George Steam Packet Company. The next year, she opened transatlantic steam passenger service when she was chartered for two voyages by the British and American Steam Navigation Company. By arriving in New York a day ahead of the Great Western, she is usually listed as the first holder of the Blue Riband, although the term was not used until decades later.

== Description ==
Sirius was 178 feet 4 inches (54.4 m) long from stem to stern and a depth of hold of 18 feet 3 inches (5.6 m). She had a beam of 25 feet 8 inches (7.8 m) and a draught of 15 feet (4.6 m). The ship had a capacity of 412 tons burthen and a gross register tonnage of 703 tons.

The ship had a two-cylinder steam engine built by Wingate & Co. driving two paddlewheels. Her boilers provided steam to the engine at a working pressure of about 5 psi (30 kPa; 0.4 kgf/cm^{2}). The engine produced a total of 500 indicated horsepower (370 kW) and the ship had a maximum speed of 12 knots (22 km/h; 14 mph). The ship could carry a maximum of 450 long tons (460 t) of coal, enough to steam 2,897 nautical miles (5,365 km; 3,334 mi) at an average speed of 6.7 knots (12.4 km/h; 7.7 mph).

Sirius was one of the first steamships built with a condenser that enabled her to use fresh water, avoiding the need to periodically shut down her boilers at sea for cleaning. Unfortunately, this also resulted in high coal consumption.

== Service ==
Sirius, the largest of the St George company's steamers, was designed for their prestige Cork-London service, on which she began in August 1837.

At the time Sirius was completed, two other companies were building steamships for proposed transatlantic passenger services. British and American's British Queen fell behind when the firm building her engines went bankrupt. Construction on the rival Great Western continued without interruption and she was ready for her first voyage by April 1838. One of British and American's directors suggested the company charter Sirius to beat Great Western. Overloaded with coal and with 45 passengers, Sirius left Cork, Ireland on 4 April and arrived in New York after a voyage of 18 days, 4 hours and 22 minutes (8.03) knots. The normal westbound passage by sailing packet was 40 days. When coal ran low, the crew were alleged by the newspapers to have been forced to burn cabin furniture, spare yards and one mast, inspiring the similar sequence in Jules Verne's Around the World in Eighty Days. However, in reality the crew were able to manage and conserve the stocks of coal by burning four barrels of resin instead, and still had 15 tons of coal left on arrival in New York. Great Western departed Avonmouth four days after Sirius and still came within a day of overtaking her. Because Sirius was clearly too small for the Cork-New York crossing, she completed only one additional round trip before she was returned to her owners and, after at least one voyage to Saint Petersburg in Oct 1838 and which was described in A Residence on the Shores of the Baltic, resumed her regular St George company service, though on the Cork-Glasgow route.

In 1839, the British Admiralty released bids for transatlantic mail service to Halifax. The St. George Steam Packet Company bid 45,000 pounds for a monthly Cork-Halifax service including Sirius and 65,000 pounds for a monthly Cork-Halifax-New York service. Great Western also bid a monthly Bristol-Halifax-New York service. However, the Admiralty rejected both bids because neither company offered fortnightly service in their bid response and the contract was finally awarded to Cunard.

In late 1840 Sirius was sent to Gibson's Dry Dock at Hull for new boilers, but remained there over two years as the dry dock had to be specially lengthened. In the face of financial difficulties, the St George company was refinanced in 1844 and took the style City of Cork Steam Ship Company, with which Sirius continued her regular employment on the Irish Sea.

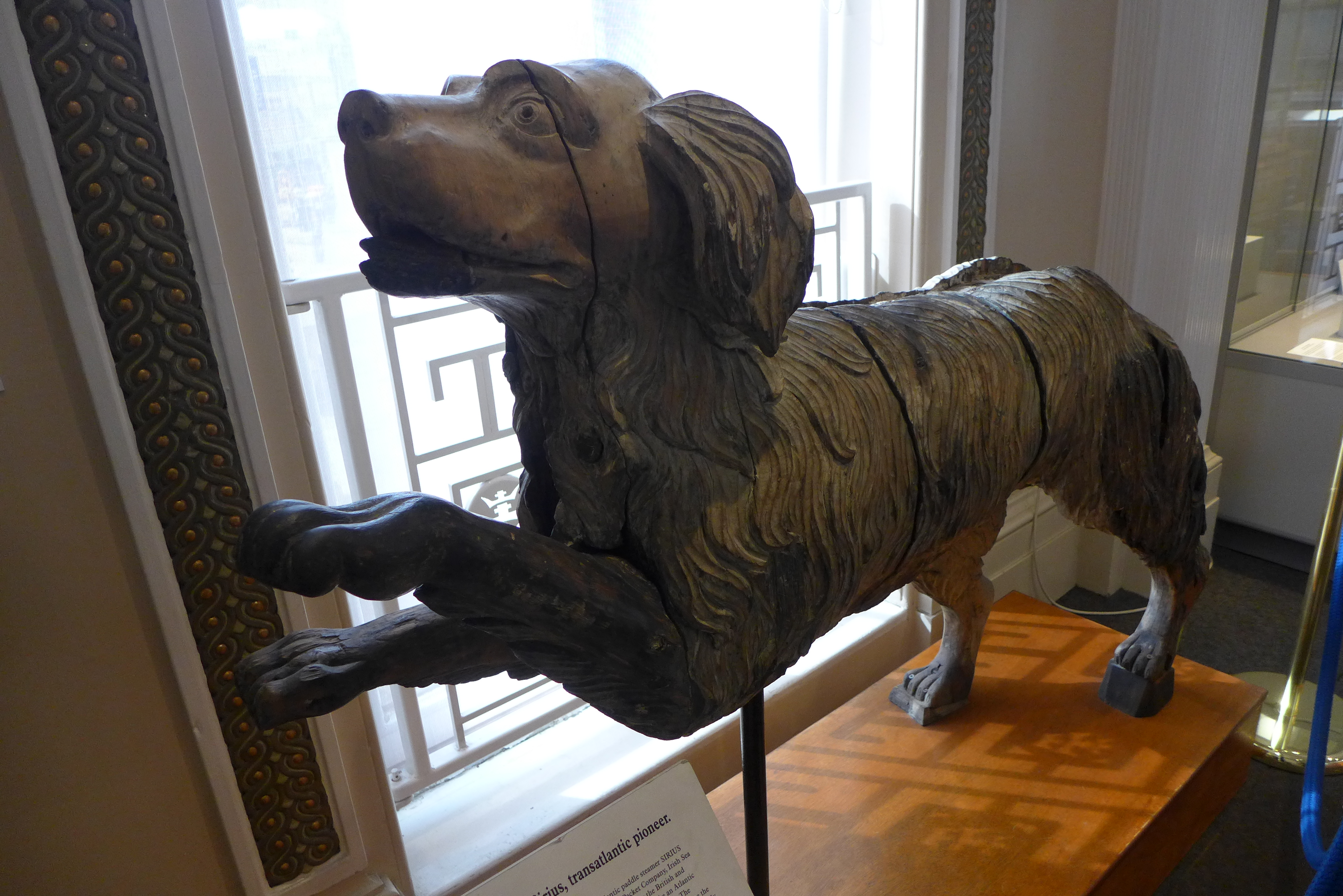
Figurehead of Sirius (dogstar) salvaged from the wreck and now in Hull Maritime Museum

== Loss ==
Sirius was wrecked in 1847. On 16 January, on a voyage to Cork from Glasgow via Dublin with cargo and passengers, she struck rocks in dense fog in Ballycotton Bay, Ireland. Despite being refloated, she was found to be leaking badly and, in steaming for the shore, was wrecked on Smith's Rocks, half a mile from Ballycotton. The only lifeboat launched was heavily overloaded; swamped by heavy seas, the twelve passengers and two crew were drowned. Most of the 91 on board were rescued by rope passed to the shore, though twenty lives in all were lost. In response to the loss of Sirius, the need for a lighthouse between Old Head Kinsale and Hook Head on Ireland's southern coast was recognised. Ballycotton lighthouse, on Ballycotton Island, was constructed over the following years and lit in 1851.

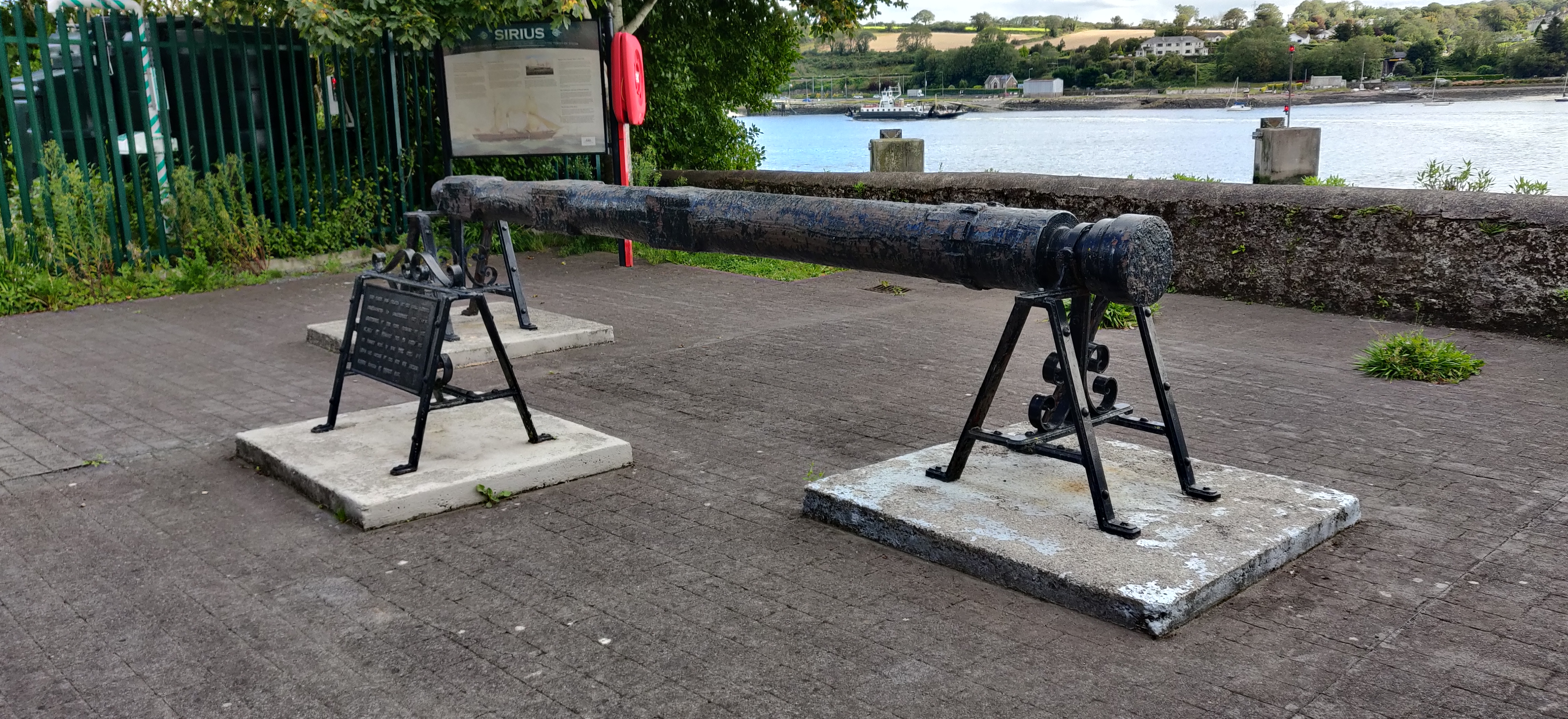
Paddle shaft of Sirius salvaged from the wreck and on display beside the Cork cross-harbour ferry near Passage West, home town of Capt Roberts.

== Bibliography ==
- Sheppard, T. (1937). "The Sirius: The First Steamer to Cross the Atlantic". Mariner's Mirror. 23 (January). Cambridge, UK: Society for Nautical Research: 84–94. doi:10.1080/00253359.1937.10657222.
- Barry, William J (April 1895). "Port of Cork Steamships from 1815 to 1894". Journal of the Cork Historical and Archaeological Society. 2nd. 1 (4): 153–157.

Records
Preceded by None	Holder of the Blue Riband (Westbound); 1838	Succeeded by Great Western
Preceded by None	Holder of the Blue Riband (Eastbound); 1838	Succeeded by Great Western
