= America-class steamship =

Class of Cunard line paddle steamers

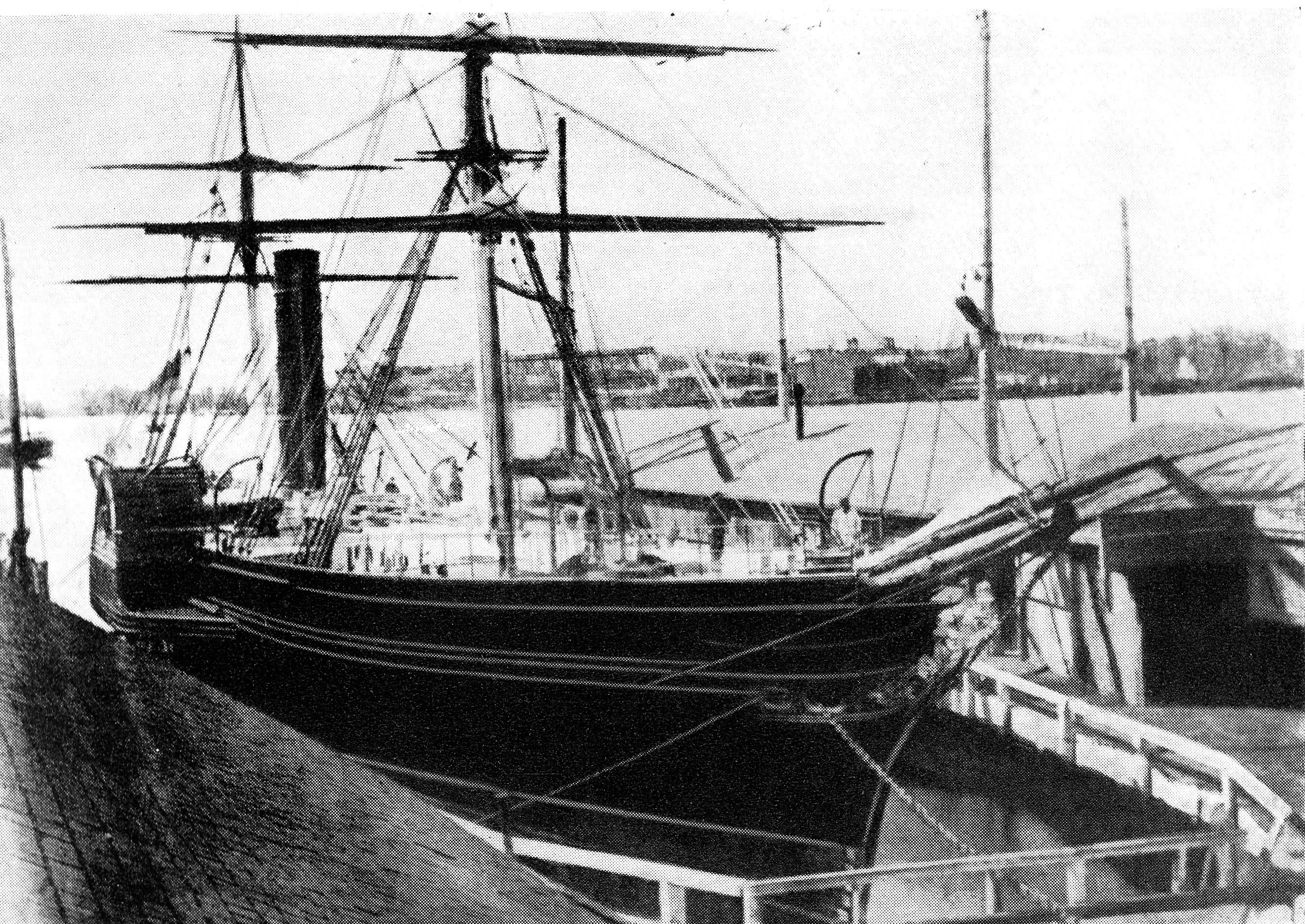
- Europa of 1848 at Boston. This is one of the earliest known photos of an Atlantic steamship

Class overview
- Builders: Clyde (Steele), Clyde (J. Wood),
- Operators: Cunard Line
- Preceded by: Britannia class
- Succeeded by: Arabia
- Subclasses: Asia class
- Built: 1848–1850
- Completed: 6

General characteristics : America, Niagara, Europa & Canada
- Tonnage: 1,850 GRT
- Length: 251 ft (77 m)
- Beam: 38 ft (12 m)
- Propulsion: Napier two-cylinder side-lever steam engine, 1,400 ihp (1,000 kW), paddle wheels
- Speed: 10 knots (19 km/h; 12 mph)

General characteristics : Asia & Africa
- Tonnage: 2,226 GRT
- Length: 266 ft (81 m)
- Beam: 40 ft (12 m)
- Propulsion: Napier two-cylinder side-lever steam engine, 2,000 ihp (1,500 kW), paddle wheels
- Speed: 12 knots (22 km/h; 14 mph)

The America class was the replacement for the Britannia class, the Cunard Line's initial fleet of wooden paddle steamers. Entering service starting in 1848, these six vessels permitted Cunard to double its schedule to weekly departures from Liverpool, with alternating sailings to New York. The new ships were also designed to meet new competition from the United States.

Larger and more powerful than the Britannias they replaced, the initial America class quartette proved to be steady performers. In 1849, they averaged 13 days 1 hour to New York via Halifax and 12 days 2 hours homeward. Two upgraded units, Asia and Africa, were ordered for delivery in 1850. However, the new Cunard liners were quickly eclipsed by the Collins Atlantic class in both luxury and speed.

All six Americas had long careers with Cunard. The initial units completed about 100 round trips and Europa lasted in the fleet for nineteen years. The final two ships, Asia and Africa, completed 120 round trip voyages, the record for wooden steamships on the Atlantic route, and were not sold until 1868.

== Development and design ==
By 1845, steamships carried half of the transatlantic saloon passengers and Cunard dominated this business. While the Great Western Steamship Company failed the next year, Samuel Cunard learned that the United States Congress enacted a subsidy of $400,000 to establish a new American steamship line for the Atlantic passenger trade. At that time, Cunard was receiving a mail subsidy from the Admiralty of £85,000 per year to operate five steamers on a fortnightly service from Liverpool to Halifax and then onto Boston. Cunard argued that to meet the new competition, service must be increased to weekly, with alternative sailings to New York. This required the construction of four new ships that were larger than the Britannia class. The Admiralty agreed and increased the subsidy by £60,000 per year to help finance the expanded venture.

The first four units of the new America class were 60% larger than the original Britannias and 90% more powerful. Coal consumption was 60 tons per day, an increase of 50% from the earlier class. The engines and related machinery cost £50,000 of the total price of £90,000 per ship. Fitted for 140 saloon passengers, accommodations were still sparse. America and Niagara represented additions to the fleet while Europa and Canada replaced Britannia and Acadia, which were then sold to the North German Confederation Navy.

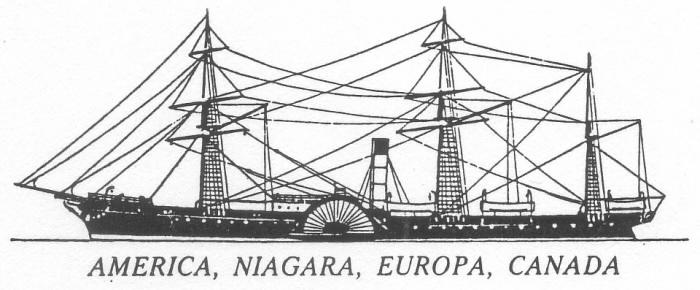
A depiction of the America-class in 1849.

The final two units were commissioned in 1850 and were another 20% larger with 40% more power. Fitted for 10 additional passengers, Asia replaced Caledonia and Africa replaced Hibernia.

== Service histories ==
=== America ===
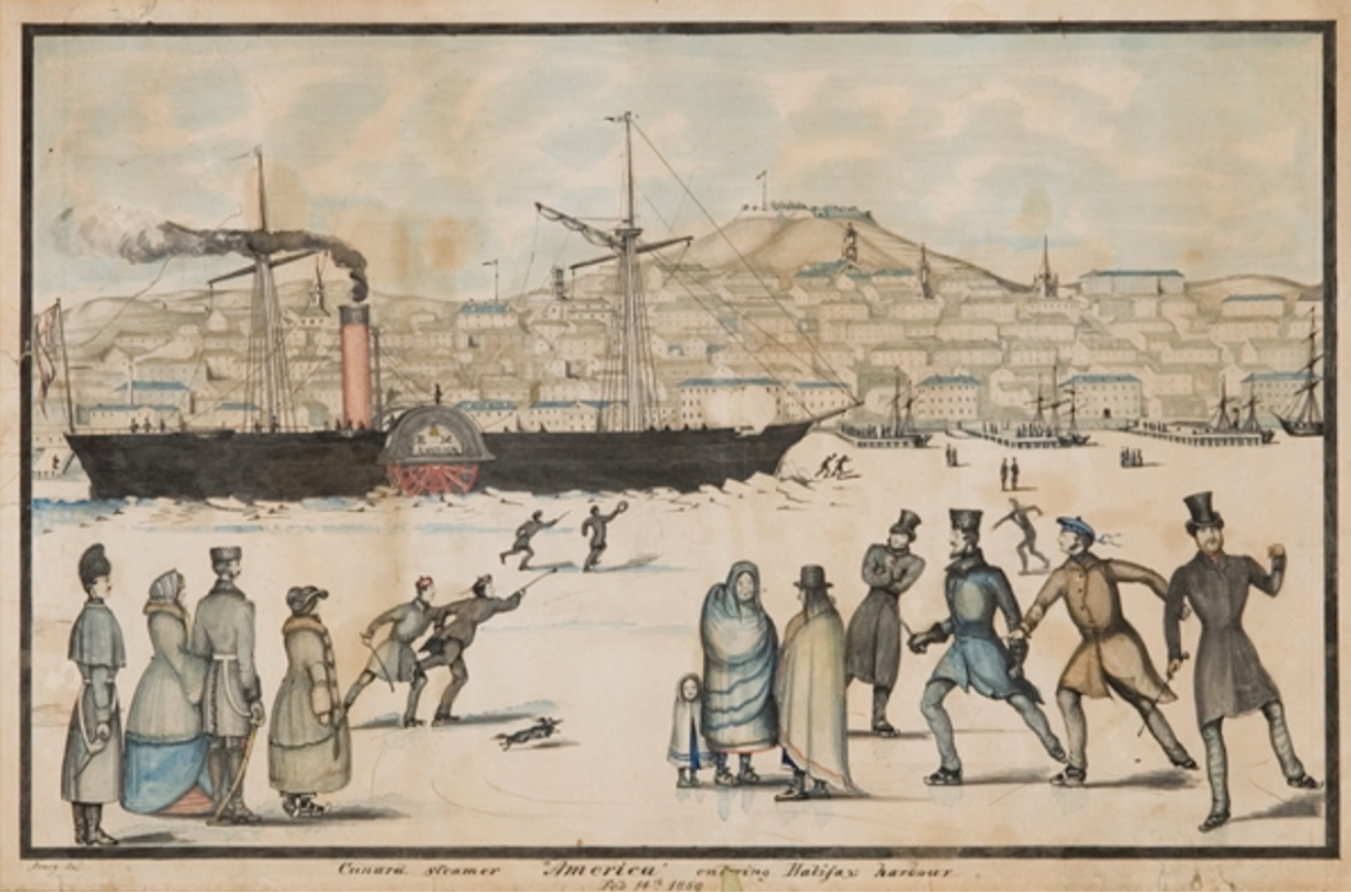
A painting of RMS America in Halifax, Valentines Day, 1859.

America won the Blue Riband on her second outward voyage in 1848 with a run from Liverpool–Halifax of 9 days 16 minutes, averaging 11.7 knots (21.7 km/h; 13.5 mph). America maintained Cunard's Halifax route when most of the rest of the fleet trooped during the Crimean War. On 14 February 1859 America made headlines when she broke through ice-choked Halifax Harbour after the normally ice-free port was paralyzed by a sudden freeze. She was chartered to the Allan Line in 1863 before being sold for conversion to a sailing ship. The former America was broken up in 1875.

Records
Preceded by Cambria	Holder of the Blue Riband (Westbound record); 1848	Succeeded by Europa

=== Niagara ===
Niagara was launched in August 1847 and departed on her maiden voyage in May 1848. She was chartered as a troop carrier during the Crimean War. Niagara remained in the fleet until 1866 when she was sold for conversion to a sailing ship. On June 6, 1875, she was wrecked near South Stack, Anglesey.

=== Europa ===
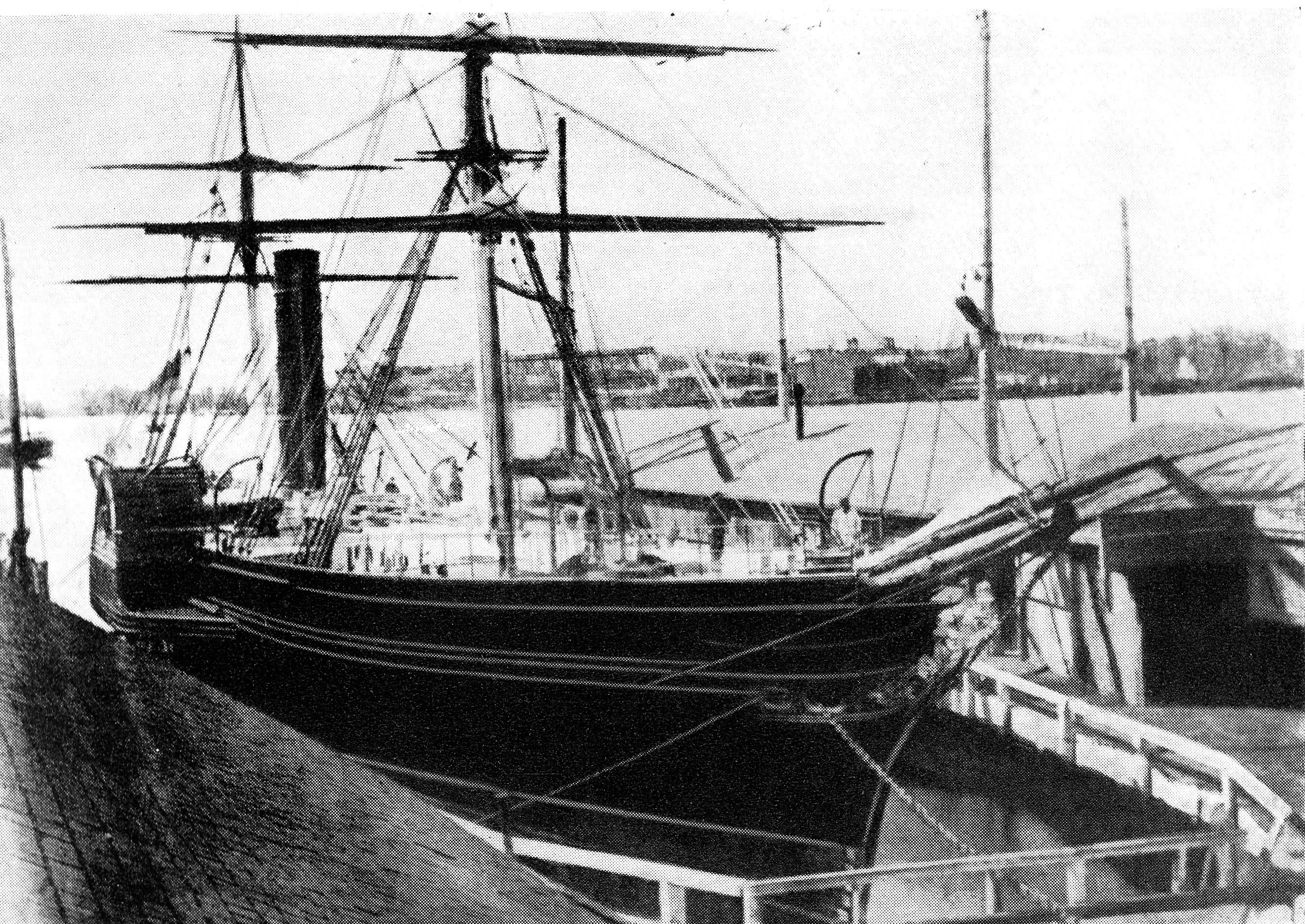
RMS Europa was one of the earliest photos of an Atlantic Steamship.

Europa was the fastest of the initial quartette and won the Blue Riband with a voyage in October 1848 between Liverpool and Halifax of 8 days 23 hours, averaging 11.79 knots (21.84 km/h; 13.57 mph). The next year, Europa collided with the barque Charles Bartlett outside New York. While Europa suffered no casualties, 88 out of 130 aboard Bartlett died. Europa was also chartered as a troopship during the Crimean War and continued in Cunard service until 1867, when she was sold and converted to a sailing ship. In 1858, Europa collided with another Cunard ship, Arabia, in the Atlantic.

Records
Preceded by America	Holder of the Blue Riband (Westbound record); 1848–1850	Succeeded by Asia

=== Canada ===
Canada was launched in June 1848 by Robert Steele & Co. in Scotland. She was 1,831 GRT and had a cargo capacity of 450 tons. On 25 November 1848, she departed Liverpool on her maiden voyage to Halifax. She won the eastbound record in 1849 with a Halifax–Liverpool voyage of 8 days 12 hours 44 minutes, an average of 12.38 knots (22.93 km/h; 14.25 mph). During the Crimean War, she remained on the Halifax route and was sold for conversion to a sailing ship in 1866. She was ultimately scrapped in 1883.

Records
Preceded by Hibernia	Blue Riband (Eastbound record); 1849–1851	Succeeded by Pacific

=== Asia ===
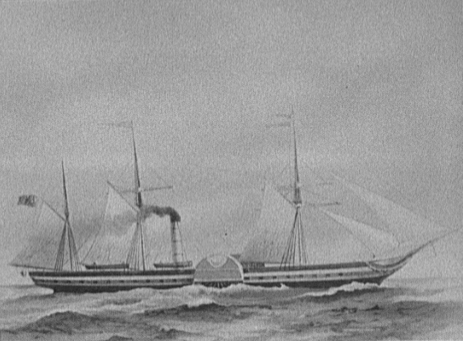
RMS Asia painting.

Asia Took the Blue Riband in May 1850 with a Liverpool–Halifax run of 8 days 14 hours 50 minutes, an average of 12.25 knots (22.69 km/h; 14.10 mph). Asia also remained on the Halifax route during the Crimean War. Gibbs reports that she may have grounded near Cape Race and beached at St Johns in a sinking condition. Asia was sold in 1868 and converted to sail. She was finally broken up in 1883.

Records
Preceded by Europa	Holder of the Blue Riband (Westbound record); 1850	Succeeded by Pacific

=== Africa ===
In October 1851, Africa struck Copeland Rock (Ireland) and was seriously damaged. She remained on the Halifax route during the Crimean War and her January 1856 departure to New York reopened that service. Africa was sold for refit as a sailing ship in 1868.
