= SS British Queen =

British passenger liner commissioned in 1839

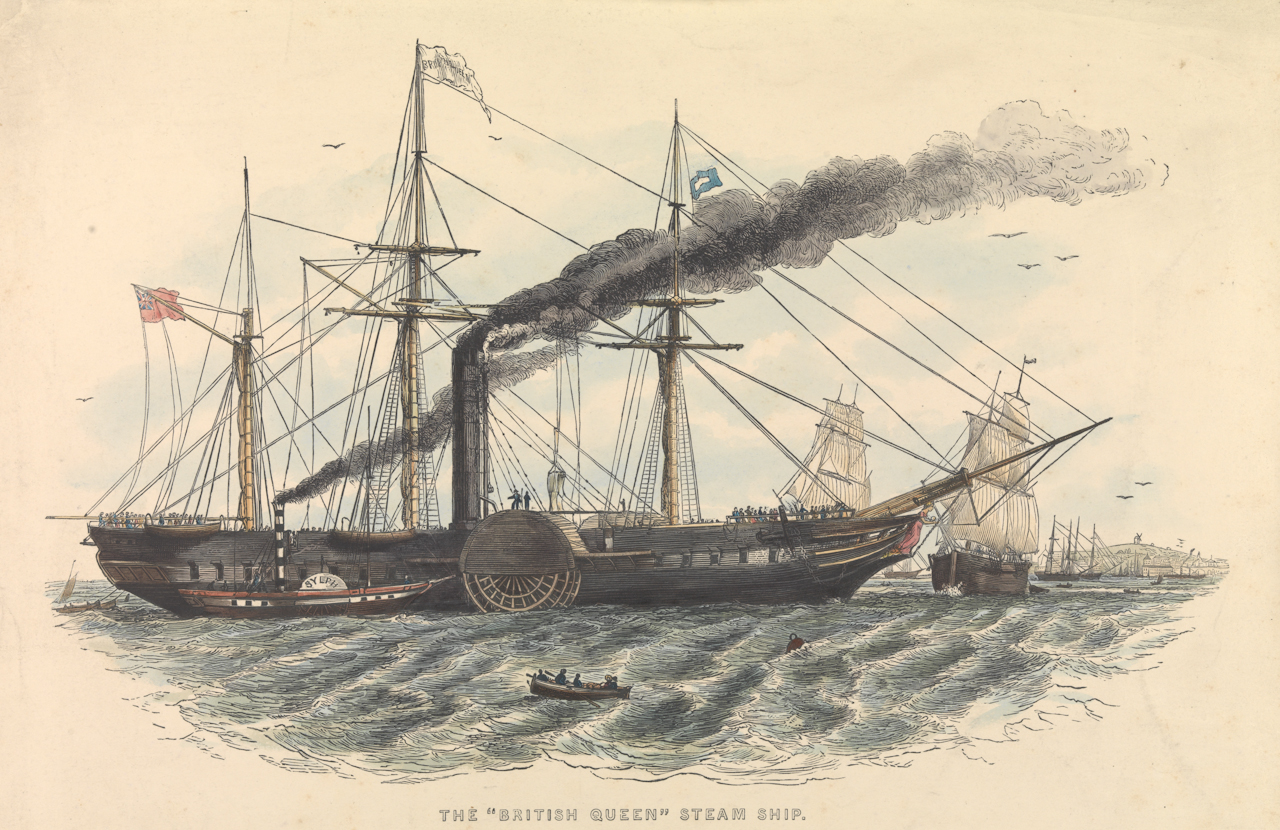
- British Queen

History

United Kingdom
- Name: British Queen
- Owner: British and American Steam Navigation Company
- Route: Atlantic crossing.
- Builder: London, Curling & Young
- Launched: 24 May 1838.
- Maiden voyage: 12 July 1839
- Fate: 1841: Sold to Belgian Government and scrapped in 1844

General characteristics
- Type: Steamship
- Tonnage: 1850 grt
- Length: 245 ft (75 m)
- Beam: 40 ft (12 m)
- Installed power: 500 hp, 800 actual power
- Sail plan: 3 masts
- Speed: 10.2 knots

British Queen was a British passenger liner that was the second steamship completed for the transatlantic route when she was commissioned in 1839. She was the largest passenger ship in the world from 1839 to 1840, then being passed by the SS President. She was named in honour of Queen Victoria and owned by the British and American Steam Navigation Company. British Queen would have been the first transatlantic steamship had she not been delayed by 18 months because of the liquidation of the firm originally contracted to build her engine.

Despite being the largest ship in the world, the British Queen was more crampt and tighter packed due to have almost double the amount of passengers than her contemporaries. (Note: The SS British Queen was 75 meters long compared to the SS Great Western which was 76.8 meters long (The SS British Queen was considered bigger on a technicality of height.). With this in mind the SS British Queen had a capacity of 207 passengers compared to the SS Great Western with only a capacity for 128 passengers (This does not account for crew.). With this information we can infer that each passenger would have to be held in a smaller room in the SS British Queen when compared to the room size of the SS Great Western, however we do not know whether the quality of their room increased or decreased when compared to the SS Great Western.) She never won the Blue Riband but matched Great Western's westbound speeds from 1838 through 1840 and was less than a half of a knot slower eastbound.

After completing nine round trip voyages, British Queen was laid up in 1841 when British-American steam navigation traffic collapsed due to the loss of the President with all on board. She was sold to the Belgian Government for an Antwerp-Cowes-New York service that began in 1842. However, this proved unsuccessful and she was laid up again after three round trip voyages. British Queen was lightly built and was scrapped in 1844 when no further use was found for the pioneer liner.

== Development and design ==
The plan outlined in British and American's prospectus called for placing four 1,200 GRT ships on the London-New York route with fortnightly departures in each direction. However, the size of the company's first unit was increased to 1,850 GRT after it became known that Great Western ordered a 1,350 GRT ship for its first liner. As designed by Macgregor Laird, British Queen was fitted for 207 passengers as compared to Great Western's 148 passengers. At 30 feet wide, her saloon was 9 feet wider than Great Western's.

Laird contracted with Curling and Young of London to build the hull, and intended to retain the Scottish engineer, Robert Napier to build the engine. However, Napier's bid of £20,000 was deemed too high, and another Scottish engine builder, Claud Girdwood tendered a lower price. Unfortunately, Girdwood's firm failed before completing the work and Napier's firm was then retained to build the engine. The delay cost British and American a critical 18 months while work on Great Western continued.

Originally, the first British and American liner was to be named Royal Victoria after Princess Victoria, but the name was changed to British Queen when the ship was launched on 24 May 1838 because Victoria had just ascended to the throne. When the new ship was towed to Scotland to have her engine installed, it was determined that the hull was not strong enough and Napier installed extra bracing.

== Service history ==
British Queen left London for her maiden voyage to New York on 11 July 1839 and stopped at Portsmouth before entering the Atlantic. Fully booked with passengers including Samuel Cunard, she arrived 15 and a half days later. British Queen cleared New York for her return on 1 August, within an hour of Great Western and arrived at Portsmouth on the 15th. Both ships steamed about the same number of miles each day before Great Western anchored at Avonmouth. British Queen completed two additional round trips in 1839 and five in 1840. Her captain claimed that her May 1840 westbound voyage of 13 days, 11 hours was better than Great Western's record, but the claim is not recognized because it was pilot to pilot, rather than the then accepted anchor to anchor. During the three-year period of 1838 through 1840, both British Queen and Great Western averaged 7.95 knots (14.72 km/h) westbound. Eastbound averages were 9.55 knots (17.69 km/h) for Great Western and 9.1 knots (16.9 km/h) for British Queen. A report to the British government concluded that British Queen was "fast when light and in light stern breeze."

During British Queen's refit after the 1840 season, her feathering paddles were changed to non-feathering design to avoid litigation with the patent holder. On her first 1841 voyage, her port paddle wheel malfunctioned by the sixth day when floats attached to the paddles dropped off one by one. The crew was making temporary repairs at sea when the ship was hit by a gale. British Queen finally made port at Halifax instead of New York after 20 days at sea. Her return was to Liverpool, which was to become her new UK terminal. However, she was laid up upon her arrival when British and American failed after the loss of President.

In August 1841, British Queen was sold to the Belgian Government for an Antwerp-Cowes-New York service that started in May 1842. In respect for Queen Victoria, the Belgians retained her name and she sailed with British officers and engineers. The fare was £21 excluding meals that were an additional charge. The service was unsuccessful and British Queen never carried more than 50 passengers. Her crossing times were slow, and she required 26 days to reach Cowes from New York on her third and last round trip after being forced to refuel at the Azores. She remained at Antwerp for the next two years before she was scrapped.
