= Smart's Fables =

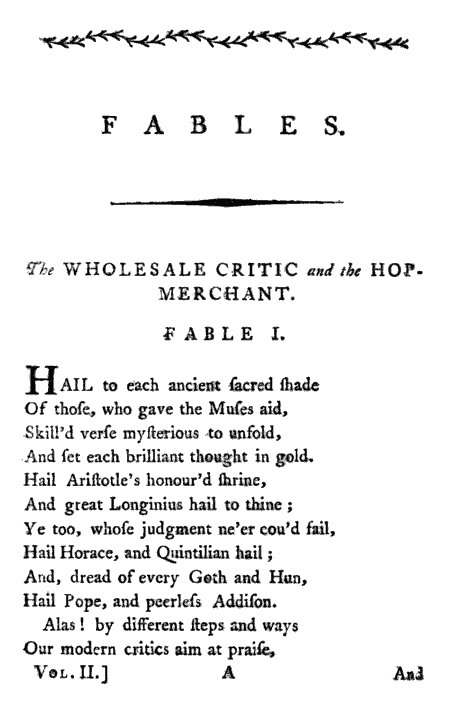
Fables. The opening page from The Poems, of the Late Christopher Smart, volume II, 1791

The Fables by Christopher Smart were written between 1750 and 1767 and partly published in the periodicals The Midwife; or The Old Woman's Magazine, The Gentleman's Magazine, The Literary Magazine, etc. The order in this collection of the fables was made by Smart himself and Christopher Hunter, Smart's biographer and nephew, after him, as it was printed posthumously in 1791 edition.

== Contents ==
Fable I.	The Wholesale Critic and Hop-Merchant 17??, publ. posth. 1791
Fable II.	The English Bull Dog, Dutch Mastiff, and Quail 1755, publ. 1758
Fable III.	Fashion and Night 1751, publ. 1752
Fable IV.	Where's the Poker? 1752
Fable V.	The Tea Pot and Scrubbing Brush 1753
Fable VI.	The Duellist[s] 1754
Fable VII.	The Country Squire and the Mandrake 1755
Fable VIII.	The Brocaded Gown and Linen Rag 1754
Fable IX.	Madam and the Magpie 1767
Fable X.	The Blockhead and Beehive 1754
Fable XI.	The Citizen and the Red Lion of Brenton 1754
Fable XII.	The Herald and Husband-Man 17??, publ. posth. 1791
Fable XIII.	A Story of a Cock and a Bull 1756
Fable XIV.	The Snake, the Goose, and Nightingale 1754
Fable XV.	Mrs. Abigail and the Dumb Waiter 1755
Fable XVI.	The Bag-Wig and the Tobacco-Pipe 1750
Fable XVII.	Care and Generosity 1751
Fable XVIII.	The Pig 1752

== Quotations ==
Among the shorter poems, the fables were the pieces most highly prized by Smart's contemporaries, and they still wear well, showing a lightness of touch and acuteness of social observation that made eighteenth-century critics put him in the same league as John Gay. Charles Burney in the Monthly Review (January 1792) rated him "the most agreeable metrical Fabulist in our language" after Gay, finding that although his versification was less polished and "his apologues in general perhaps less correct" than those of Gay and Edward Moore, nevertheless "in originality, in wit, in humour, the preference seems due to Smart."

— Karina Williamson, St. Hilda's College, Oxford, and University of Edinburgh

== Bibliography ==
- The Poetical Works of Christopher Smart: Volume IV: Miscellaneous Poems, English and Latin Edited by Karina Williamson Oxford University Press, USA (May 21, 1987) ISBN 0-19-812768-5 ISBN 978-0-19-812768-0
