= The System or Theory of the Trade of the World =

Economics book

Trade of the World
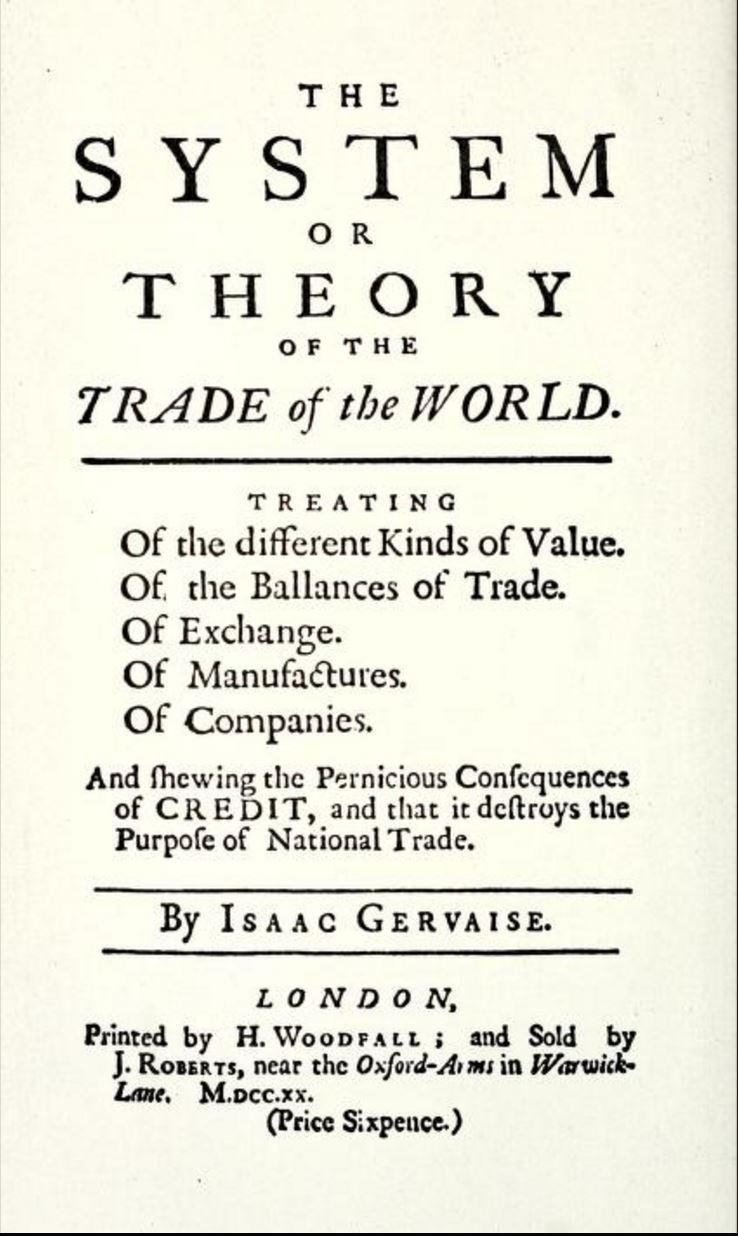
- Author: Isaac Gervaise
- Language: English
- Genre: Economics, Philosophy
- Publisher: Henry Woodfall
- Publication date: 1720
- Publication place: England, France

On the System or Theory of the Trade of the World is an immediate precursor to the first modern economic texts, written by Isaac Gervaise and published in 1720.

Along with several other early economic texts, Gervaise was building on the efforts to understand the catastrophic damage that the unstable value of gold had wreaked upon Europe during the two centuries of price revolution that had occurred up to that point. During that period, the importation of gold from the New World had caused relatively enormous inflation in Europe, especially Spain, with fluctuations of deflation in between.

== The book ==
Written thirty years before Ferdinando Galiani's book on monetary theory, Della Moneta (which may have built upon it), Trade of the World attempted to examine the same problems that prompted Galiani, though he did so in a more primitive way.

Among the topics he explicitly identifies and addresses are "Credit, and Its Effects on Trade", "The Balance of Trade", and inflation/deflation, which he refers to as "Accidents that Change the Proportion of Particular Denominators" and "Altering the Denomination of Coin". He goes on to discuss other, non-monetary economic issues, like manufacturing and businesses.

The book is subtitled And showing the Pernicious Consequences of CREDIT, and that it destroys the Purpose of National Trade...and thus it's no surprise that Gervaise concludes the special favours granted in mercantilism, essentially protectionism and state-imposed corporate oligopoly and funding, are harmful to the economy and have caused many of the more recent inflation problems. At the time of its publication, in fact, the Royal Lustring Company had lost its own charter amid scandal, after having operated for the previous 23 years in such a capacity. The company, which dealt in the manufacture of fabric using Asian silk, had gone out of business in a catastrophic way that would seem familiar with the corporate crises of the early 21st century, including a calls for a bailout and trade protection. His own family an investor in that company, all of this is alluded to by Gervaise in his own book's foreword.
