= 1684 =

1684 in various calendars
- Gregorian calendar: 1684; MDCLXXXIV
- Ab urbe condita: 2437
- Armenian calendar: 1133; ԹՎ ՌՃԼԳ
- Assyrian calendar: 6434
- Balinese saka calendar: 1605–1606
- Bengali calendar: 1090–1091
- Berber calendar: 2634
- English Regnal year: 35 Cha. 2 – 36 Cha. 2
- Buddhist calendar: 2228
- Burmese calendar: 1046
- Byzantine calendar: 7192–7193
- Chinese calendar: 癸亥年 (Water Pig); 4381 or 4174 — to — 甲子年 (Wood Rat); 4382 or 4175
- Coptic calendar: 1400–1401
- Discordian calendar: 2850
- Ethiopian calendar: 1676–1677
- Hebrew calendar: 5444–5445
- Hindu calendars
- Vikram Samvat: 1740–1741
- Shaka Samvat: 1605–1606
- Kali Yuga: 4784–4785
- Holocene calendar: 11684
- Igbo calendar: 684–685
- Iranian calendar: 1062–1063
- Islamic calendar: 1095–1096
- Japanese calendar: Tenna 4 / Jōkyō 1 (貞享元年)
- Javanese calendar: 1606–1607
- Julian calendar: Gregorian minus 10 days
- Korean calendar: 4017
- Minguo calendar: 228 before ROC 民前228年
- Nanakshahi calendar: 216
- Thai solar calendar: 2226–2227
- Tibetan calendar: ཆུ་མོ་ཕག་ལོ་ (female Water-Boar); 1810 or 1429 or 657 — to — ཤིང་ཕོ་བྱི་བ་ལོ་ (male Wood-Rat); 1811 or 1430 or 658

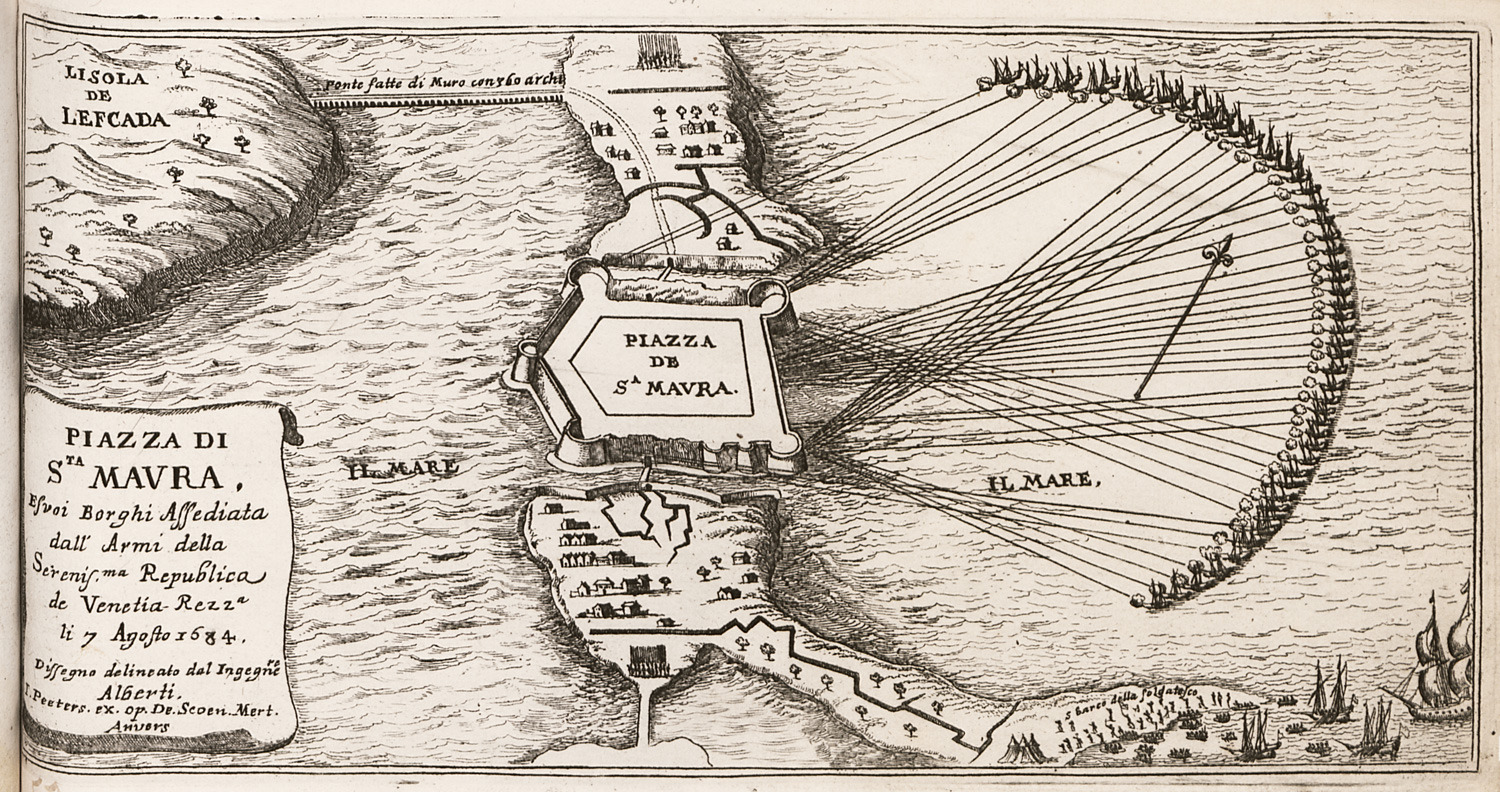
August 7: Morean War: The Republic of Venice begins the bombardment the Ottoman Empire fortress on the island of Lefkada.

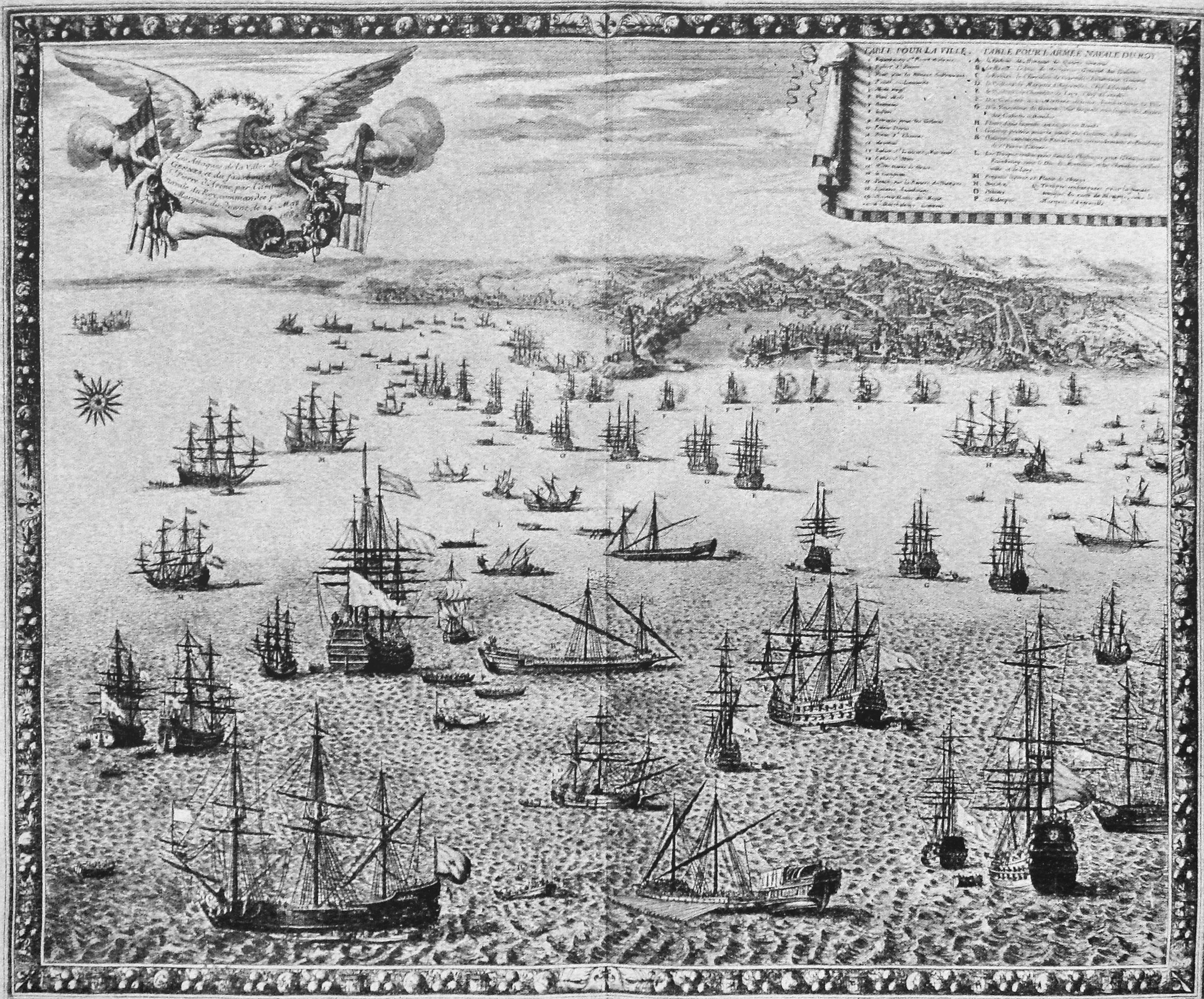
May 18: French Navy begins the Bombardment of Genoa and destroys most of the city in 10 days.

1684 (MDCLXXXIV) was a leap year starting on Saturday of the Gregorian calendar and a leap year starting on Tuesday of the Julian calendar, the 1684th year of the Common Era (CE) and Anno Domini (AD) designations, the 684th year of the 2nd millennium, the 84th year of the 17th century, and the 5th year of the 1680s decade. As of the start of 1684, the Gregorian calendar was 10 days ahead of the Julian calendar, which remained in localized use until 1923.

== Events ==
=== January–March ===
- January 5
  - King Charles II of England gives the title Duke of St Albans to Charles Beauclerk, his illegitimate son by Nell Gwyn.
  - The earliest form of what is now the University of Tokyo (formally chartered in 1877), the Tenmongata, is established in Japan.
- January 15 (January 5 O.S.) – To demonstrate that the River Thames, frozen solid during the Great Frost that started in December, is safe to walk upon, "a Coach and six horses drove over the Thames for a wager" and within three days "whole streets of Booths are built on the Thames and thousands of people are continually walking thereon." Sir Richard Newdigate, 2nd Baronet, records the events in his diary.
- January 26 – Marcantonio Giustinian is elected Doge of Venice.
- January – Edmond Halley, Christopher Wren and Robert Hooke have a conversation in which Hooke later claimed not only to have derived the inverse-square law, but also all the laws of planetary motion attributed to Sir Isaac Newton. Hooke's claim is that in a letter to Newton on 6 January 1680, he first stated the inverse-square law.
- February 7 – Morocco retakes control of the city of Tangier from England, which had controlled the North African port since 1661. During the five months prior to evacuation of the English from the city, the Governor, Lord Dartmouth had ordered the destruction of the wall around the city, its fortifications and port facilities that had been built by the English during the occupation.
- February 8 – Prince Dumitrașcu Cantacuzino returns to the throne of the principality of Moldavia for a third reign but is overthrown 14 months later on June 25. In 1859, Moldavia will unite with neighboring Wallachia to form the Kingdom of Romania.
- February 15 (February 5 O.S.) – The Great Frost in Britain, during which the River Thames was frozen in London and the sea as far as 2 miles (3.2 km) out from land and which started the previous December, ends as the Thames begins to thaw. William Maitland later writes that the Frost, which started in December 1683, "congealed the river Thames to that degree that another city, as it were, was erected thereon; where by the great number of streets and shops, with their rich furniture, it represented a great fair, with a variety of carriages, and diversions of all sorts." During the freeze, there had been great loss of beast and of wildlife, especially birds, and similar reports from across Northern Europe. The Chipperfield's Circus dynasty began during the freeze, with James Chipperfield introducing performing animals to the country at the Frost Fair on the Thames in London.
- February 24 – A treaty is signed between European German colonists in Brandenburg-Prussia, and the African chiefs in what is now Ghana to permit the German colonists to build a second fort on the Brandenburger Gold Coast, and the fortress of Dorotheenschanze is built. The area is now the Ghanaian city of Akwida.
- March 5 – Pope Innocent XI forms a Holy League with the Habsburg Empire, Venice and Poland, to end Ottoman Turkish rule in Europe.
- March 19 – In Japan, the Tenna era ends on the 21st day of the 2nd month of the Chinese calendar of the 4th year of the Tenna era and the Jōkyō era begins as Japan's royal astronomer, Shibukawa Shunkai institutes the Jōkyō calendar to replace Chinese calendar which had been used in Japan since 859 AD, after calculating that the length of the solar year is 365.2417 days.

=== April–June ===
- April 25 – The Morean War begins as the Republic of Venice declares war on the Ottoman Empire for control of the Peloponnese area of Greece, a peninsula which includes Corinth and Sparta and has been referred to by the Ottomans as Morea.
- May 18 – The French Navy begins a 10-day bombardment of the Italian city of Genoa in the course of the War of the Reunions between France and the Republic of Genoa. During the fight, the French fleet, commanded by Abraham Duquesne, fires almost 13,000 cannonballs, pausing only during a cease-fire on May 21 and May 22, and uses the new technology of explosive bombs. When the bombardment ends on May 28, two-thirds of the city has been destroyed or damaged.
- June 7 – After a siege of six weeks that began on April 27, Luxembourg City is taken by the French Army from control by Spain, and the Grand Duchy of Luxembourg, previously part of the Spanish Netherlands (now Belgium) is acquired by France.
- June 27 – Francisco de Távora, the Viceroy of Portuguese India, a small colony located in southwestern India at Goa, issues an order prohibiting indigenous residents from speaking their native language, Konkani, and directs them to learn Portuguese within the next three years.

=== July–September ===
- July 21–August 6 – Morean War: Siege of Santa Maura – The Republic of Venice captures the Ottoman island fortress of Santa Maura.
- July 24 – René-Robert Cavelier, Sieur de La Salle sails again from France, with a large expedition designed to establish a French colony on the Gulf of Mexico, at the mouth of the Mississippi River.
- August – Edmond Halley goes to Cambridge to discuss the problem of planetary motion with Isaac Newton.
- August 15
  - France under Louis XIV makes the Truce of Ratisbon separately with the Holy Roman Empire (Habsburg) and Spain.
  - Louis XIV decrees the foundation of the Maison royale de Saint-Louis, a boarding school for girls at Saint-Cyr, at the urging of Madame de Maintenon.
- September 21 – Morean War: The Republic of Venice captures the fortress town of Preveza from the Ottoman Empire.

=== October–December ===
- October 7 – Japanese Chief Minister Hotta Masatoshi is assassinated, leaving Shōgun Tokugawa Tsunayoshi without any adequate advisors, leading him to issue impractical edicts and create hardships for the Japanese people.
- November 8 – James Renwick, a Scottish minister and one of the "Covenanters" challenging the attempt by Kings James VI and Charles I to take over churches in Scotland, posts his "Apologetical Declaration" on church doors and market crosses in and around Cambusnethan, Lanarkshire.
- November 19 – Richard Keigwin, who had arrested the East India Company's Governor of Bombay in 1683, Josiah Child and had taken over as the unauthorized administrator of Bombay, turns control back to the company and its envoy, Sir Thomas Grantham, receiving a general pardon.
- December 10 – Isaac Newton's derivation of Kepler's laws from his theory of gravity, contained in the paper De motu corporum in gyrum, is read to the Royal Society by Edmond Halley.
- December 17 – The Tibet–Ladakh–Mughal War, which had been going on since 1679, ends with the signing of the Treaty at Tingmosgang between the 5th Dalai Lama (Desi Sangye Gyatso) and King Delek Namgyal of Ladakh. The Ladakh kingdom agrees to not invite foreign armies into the area (now part of the Indian union territory of Jammu and Kashmir) in return for a respect for its sovereignty.

=== Date unknown ===
- Japanese poet Ihara Saikaku composes 23,500 verses in 24 hours at the Sumiyoshi-taisha (shrine) at Osaka; the scribes cannot keep pace with his dictation and just count the verses.
- The British East India Company receives Chinese permission to build a trading station at Canton. Tea sells in Europe for less than a shilling a pound, but the import duty of 5 shillings makes it too expensive for most English people to afford; hence smuggled tea is drunk much more than legally imported tea.
- John Bunyan publishes the second part of The Pilgrim's Progress.

== Births ==
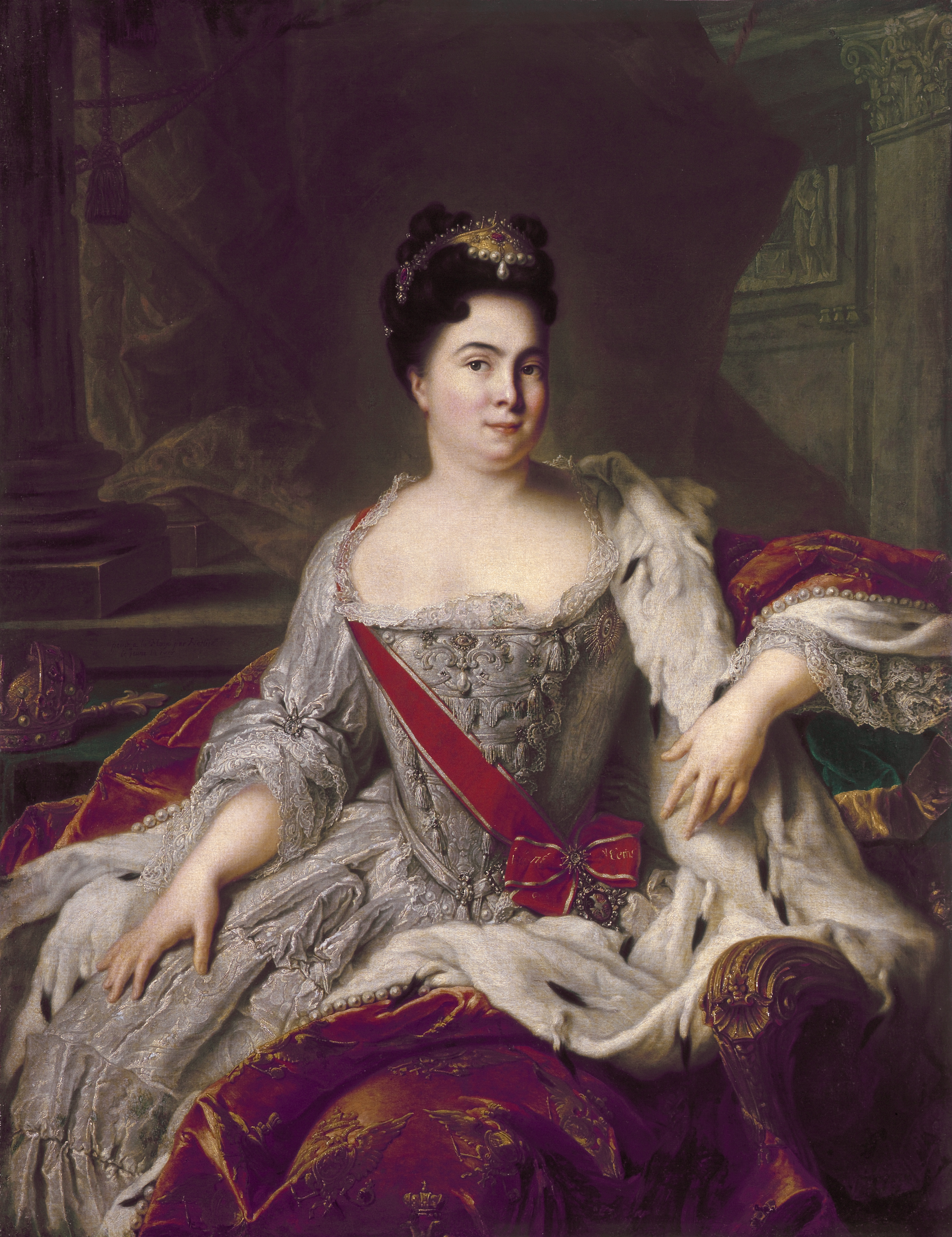
Catherine I of Russia

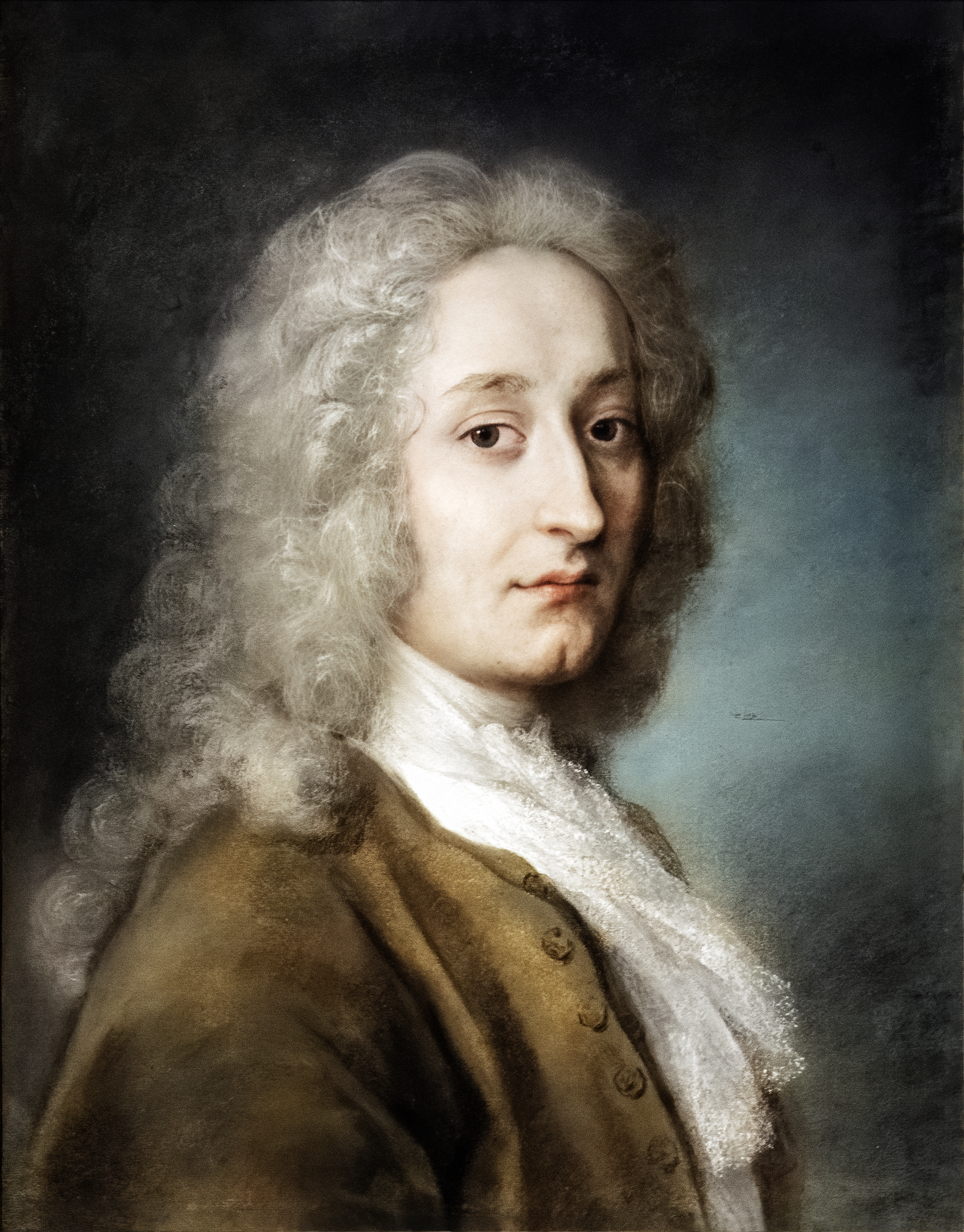
Jean-Antoine Watteau

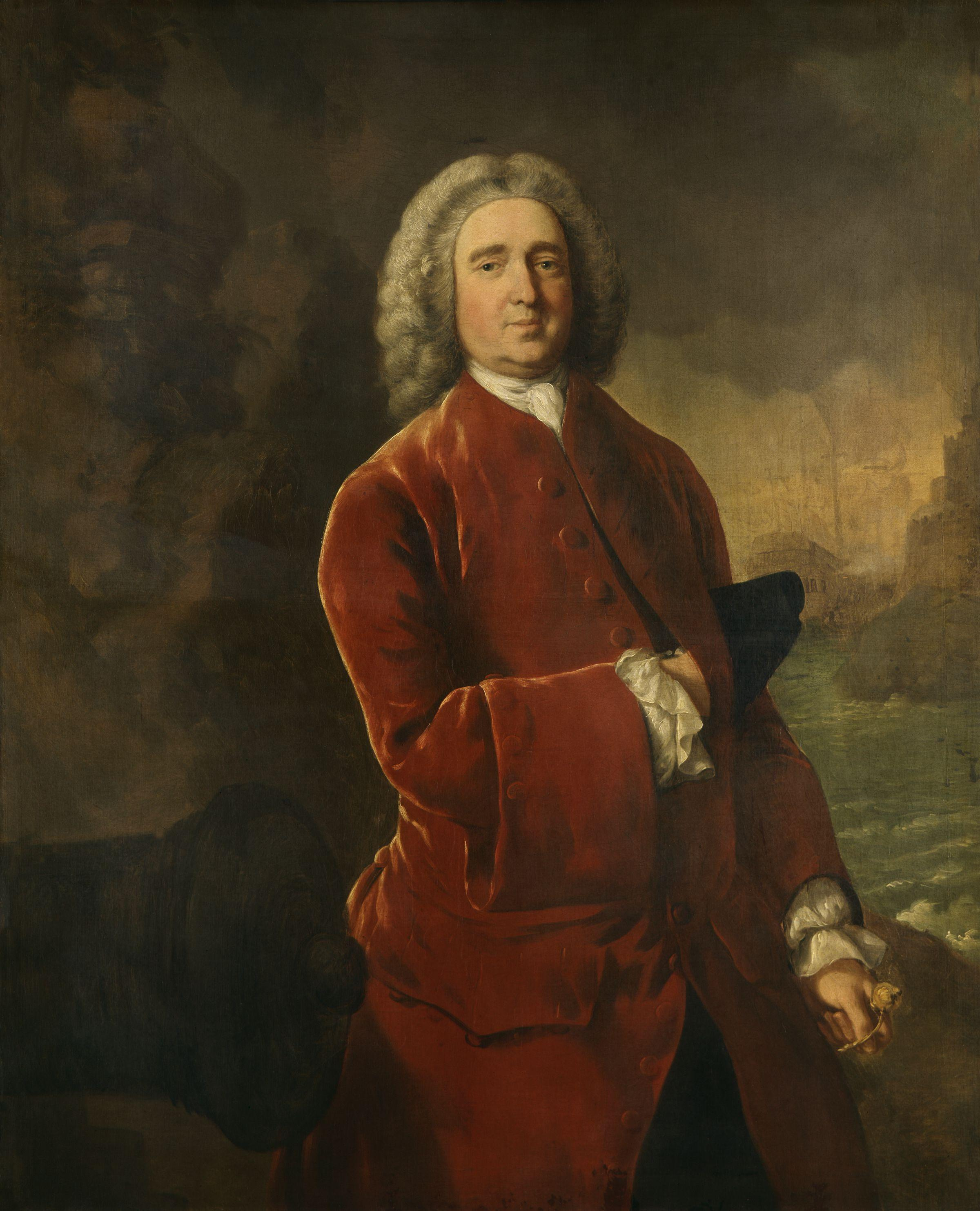
Edward Vernon

- January 1 – Arnold Drakenborch, Dutch classical scholar (d. 1748)
- January 4
  - Henry Coote, 5th Earl of Mountrath, British politician (d. 1720)
  - Henry Grove, English nonconformist minister (d. 1738)
- January 14
  - Johann Matthias Hase, German astronomer, mathematician and cartographer (d. 1742)
  - Jean-Baptiste van Loo, French subject and portrait painter (d. 1745)
- January 18 – Johann David Köhler, German historian (d. 1755)
- January 23 – Christian Rantzau, Danish noble (d. 1771)
- January 24 – Charles Alexander, Duke of Württemberg, regent of the Kingdom of Serbia (1720–1733) (d. 1737)
- February 16 – Bohuslav Matěj Černohorský, Czech composer (d. 1742)
- February 19 – George Duckett, English Member of Parliament (d. 1732)
- February 20 – Edward Bayly, Irish politician (d. 1741)
- February 21 – Justus van Effen, Dutch author (d. 1735)
- February 22 – Charles, Count of Armagnac, French noble (d. 1751)
- February 24 – Matthias Braun, Czech sculptor (d. 1738)
- March 2 – Christopher Wandesford, 2nd Viscount Castlecomer, Anglo-Irish Member of Parliament (d. 1719)
- March 19 – Jean Astruc, French physician and scholar (d. 1766)
- March 21 – Oley Douglas, English Member of Parliament (d. 1719)
- March 22
  - Matthias Bel, Hungarian pastor, polymath (d. 1749)
  - William Pulteney, 1st Earl of Bath, English noble (d. 1764)
- March 24 – Samuel von Schmettau, Prussian field marshal (d. 1751)
- March 28 – Tekle Haymanot I, Emperor of Ethiopia (d. 1708)
- March 31 – Francesco Durante, Neapolitan composer (d. 1755)
- April 2 – Henry Somerset, 2nd Duke of Beaufort, English noble (d. 1714)
- April 10 – Joseph Paris Duverney, French banker (d. 1770)
- April 15 – Catherine I of Russia, empress consort (d. 1727)
- April 25 – Marco Benefial, Italian painter (d. 1764)
- May 2 – William Henry, Prince of Nassau-Usingen, Prince of Nassau-Usingen (1702–1718) (d. 1718)
- May 5 – Françoise Charlotte d'Aubigné, French noble (d. 1739)
- May 23 – Hachisuka Muneteru, Japanese daimyō of the Edo period (d. 1743)
- May 27 – Wilhelm Reinhard von Neipperg, Austrian field marshal (d. 1774)
- May 31
  - Timothy Cutler, American Episcopal clergyman, rector of Yale College (d. 1765)
  - Georg Engelhard Schröder, Swedish artist (d. 1750)
- June 4 – Louis Charles, Duke of Schleswig-Holstein-Sonderburg-Franzhagen, German nobleman (d. 1707)
- June 6 – Nathaniel Lardner, English theologian (d. 1768)
- June 15 – Ernest Leopold, Landgrave of Hesse-Rotenburg, German noble (d. 1749)
- June 22 – Francesco Manfredini, Italian Baroque composer (d. 1762)
- July 3 – Jean-Baptiste Baudry, Canadian gunsmith (d. 1755)
- August 22 – Archduchess Maria Theresa of Austria (d. 1696)
- August 24 – Sir Robert Munro, 6th Baronet, British politician (d. 1746)
- August 30 – Marguerite de Launay, baronne de Staal, French author (d. 1750)
- September 1 – Jaime Álvares Pereira de Melo, 3rd Duke of Cadaval, Portuguese noble and statesman (d. 1749)
- September 17
  - Henry Cantrell, Anglican clergyman, writer (d. 1773)
  - Elizabeth Hanson, American captive of Native Americans and writer (d. 1737)
- September 18 – Johann Gottfried Walther, German music theorist, organist and composer (d. 1748)
- September 22 – Charles Louis Auguste Fouquet, duc de Belle-Isle, French general and statesman (d. 1761)
- October 2 – Thomas Seaton, English religious writer (d. 1741)
- October 8 – Karl Aigen, Austrian painter (d. 1762)
- October 9 – Christopher of Baden-Durlach, German prince (d. 1723)
- October 10 – Jean-Antoine Watteau, French painter (d. 1721)
- October 16 – Peter Walkden, English Presbyterian minister and diarist (d. 1769)
- October 26 – Kurt Christoph Graf von Schwerin, Prussian Generalfeldmarschall (d. 1757)
- October 28 – Paul Alphéran de Bussan, French bishop (d. 1757)
- November 1 – Mikhail Mikhailovich Golitsyn, Russian admiral (d. 1764)
- November 11 – Algernon Seymour, 7th Duke of Somerset, English noble (d. 1750)
- November 12 – Edward Vernon, English admiral (d. 1757)
- November 16 – Allen Bathurst, 1st Earl Bathurst, English noble (d. 1775)
- November 25 – Paul-Hippolyte de Beauvilliers, duke of Saint-Aignan, French diplomat and soldier (d. 1776)
- December 3 – Ludvig Holberg, Norwegian historian and writer (d. 1754)
- December 9 – Abraham Vater, German anatomist (d. 1751)
- December 14 – Siwart Haverkamp, Dutch classical scholar (d. 1742)
- December 15
  - James Jurin, British mathematician, doctor (d. 1750)
  - August Friedrich Müller, German legal scholar, logician (d. 1761)
- December 16 – Samuel Clark of St Albans, English theologian (d. 1750)
- December 21 – Ippolito Desideri, Italian Tibetologist (d. 1733)
- December 31 – William Grimston, 1st Viscount Grimston, Irish noble (d. 1756)
- Date unknown
  - Celia Grillo Borromeo, Genovese scientist and mathematician (d. 1777)
  - Jaime de la Té y Sagau, Spanish composer (d. 1736)

== Deaths ==
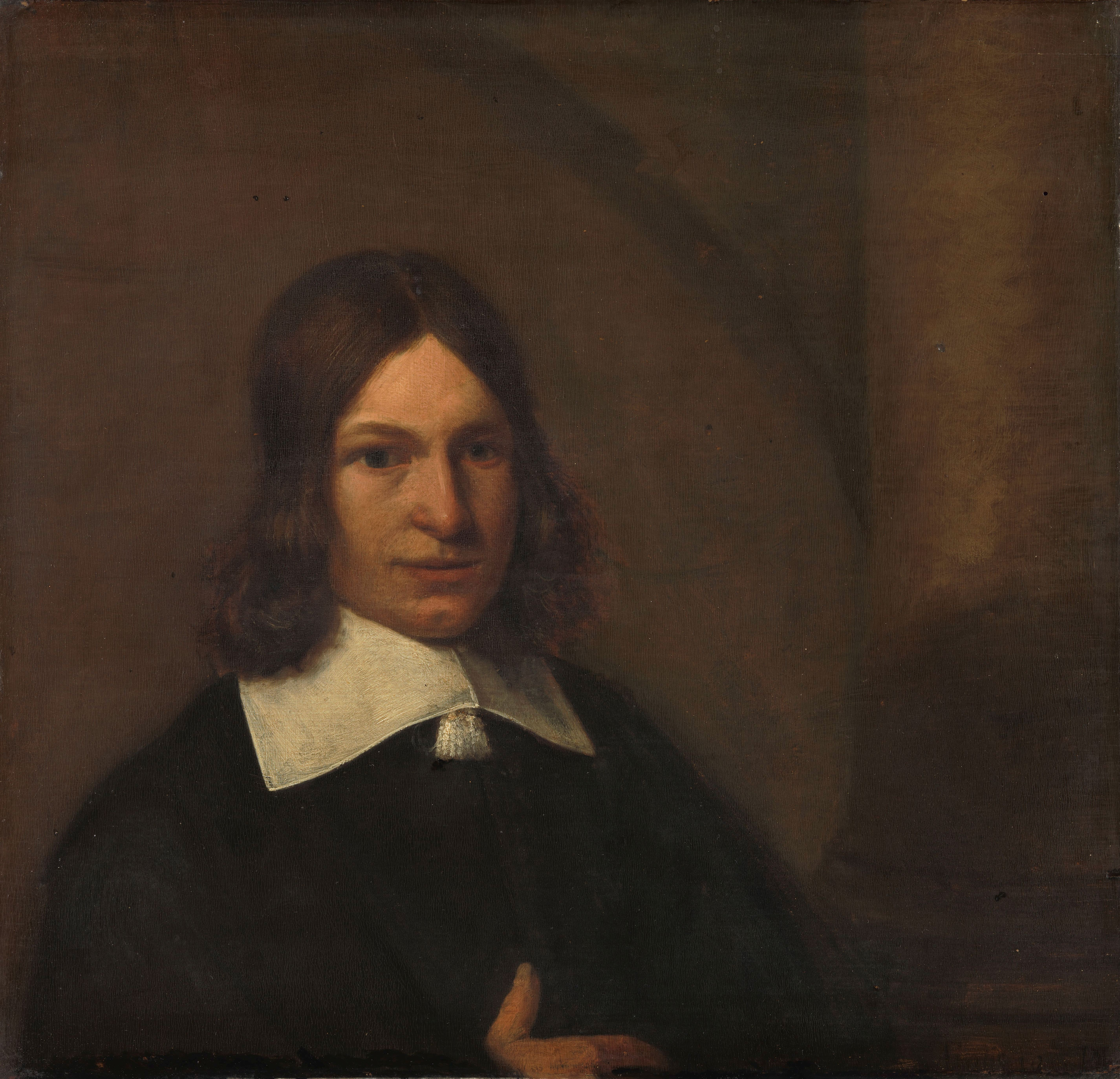
Pieter de Hooch

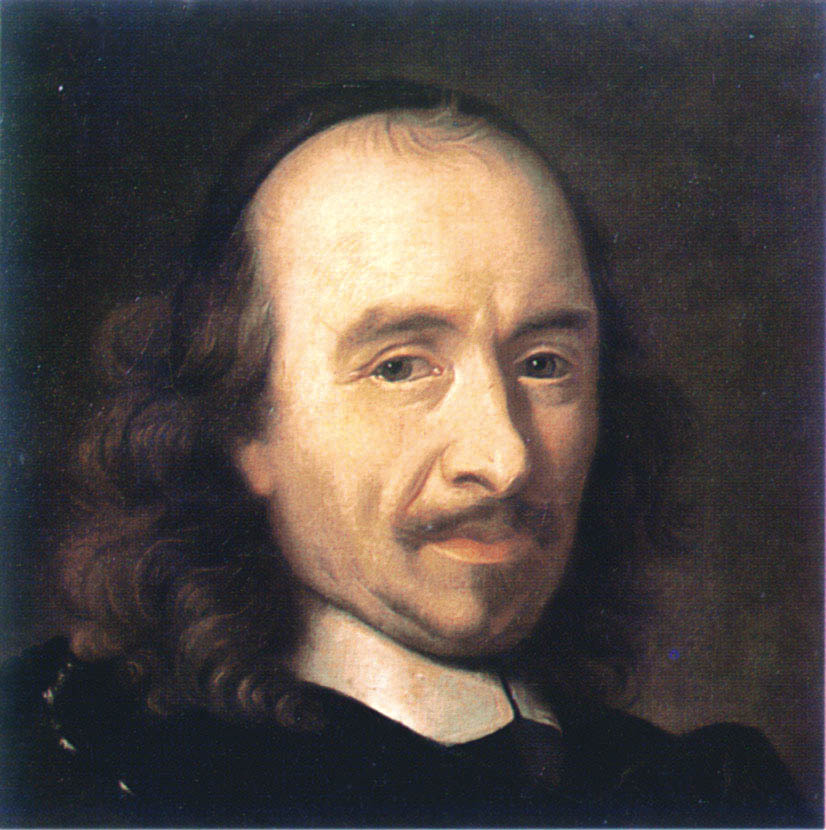
Pierre Corneille

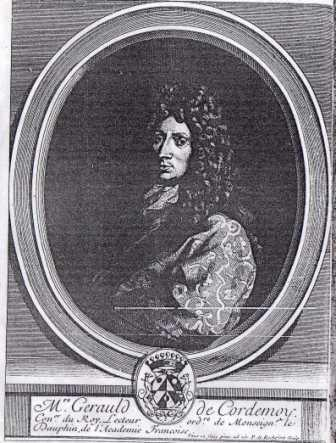
Géraud de Cordemoy

- January 4 – Louis-Isaac Lemaistre de Sacy, French Bible translator (b. 1613)
- January 11 – Cornelis Speelman, Governor-General of the Dutch East Indies (b. 1628)
- January 13 – Henry Howard, 6th Duke of Norfolk, English noble (b. 1628)
- January 15 – Alvise Contarini, Doge of Venice (b. 1601)
- January 21 – Queen Myeongseong, Korean royal consort (b. 1642)
- January 29 – Angélique de Saint-Jean Arnauld d'Andilly, French Jansenist nun (b. 1624)
- February 6 – Ernst Bogislaw von Croÿ, German Lutheran administrator (b. 1620)
- February 11 – Sir Thomas Peyton, 2nd Baronet, English politician (b. 1613)
- February 25 – Dorothy Spencer, Countess of Sunderland, English noblewoman (b. 1617)
- March 24
  - Pieter de Hooch, Dutch painter (b. 1629)
  - Elizabeth Ridgeway, English poisoner (burned at the stake)
- April 3 – Marc Restout, French painter (b. 1616)
- April 5
  - Lord William Brouncker, English mathematician (b. 1602)
  - Karl Eusebius, Prince of Liechtenstein (b. 1611)
- April 6 – Domenico Maria Canuti, Italian Baroque painter (b. 1625)
- April 12 – Nicola Amati, Cremonese violin-maker (b. 1596)
- April 13 – Nicolás Antonio, Spanish bibliographer (b. 1617)
- April 24 – Johann Olearius, German hymnwriter (b. 1611)
- May 4 – John Nevison, English highwayman (hanged) (b. 1639)
- May 10 – Anne Carr, Countess of Bedford, English noble (b. 1615)
- May 12 – Edme Mariotte, French physicist and priest (b. c. 1620)
- June 9 – Peregrine Palmer, English politician (b. 1605)
- June 24 – Sir Edward Dering, 2nd Baronet, Irish politician (b. 1625)
- July 6 – Peter Gunning, English royalist churchman (b. 1614)
- July 12 – John Rogers, American President of Harvard University (b. 1630)
- July 26 – Elena Cornaro Piscopia, Venetian philosopher of noble descent (b. 1646)
- August 8 – George Booth, 1st Baron Delamer, English royalist politician, soldier and landowner (b. 1622)
- August 20 – Maria d'Este, Italian noble (b. 1644)
- September 9 – Jakob Thomasius, German philosopher (b. 1622)
- October 1 – Pierre Corneille, French playwright (b. 1606)
- October 11 – James Tuchet, 3rd Earl of Castlehaven, Anglo-Irish noble and soldier (b. c. 1617)
- October 12 – William Croone, English physician, an original Fellow of the Royal Society (b. 1633)
- October 15
  - Géraud de Cordemoy, French historian, philosopher and lawyer (b. 1626)
  - Julius Siegmund, Duke of Württemberg-Juliusburg, German noble (b. 1653)
- October 24 – Duchess Marie Elisabeth of Saxony (b. 1610)
- October 25 – Dud Dudley, English ironmaster (b. 1600?)
- November 20
  - Bartolomé Garcia de Escañuela, Spanish Catholic prelate and bishop (b. 1627)
  - Cornelius Van Steenwyk, American politician (b. 1626)
- November 23 – William Cavendish, 3rd Earl of Devonshire, English noble (b. 1617)
- December 10 – Sir Thomas Sclater, 1st Baronet, English politician (b. 1615)
- December 22 – Francis Hawley, 1st Baron Hawley, English politician (b. 1608)
- date unknown – Alexandra Mavrokordatou, Greek intellectual, salonist (b. 1605)
