= Monetary economics =

Branch of economics covering theories of money

Monetary economics is the branch of economics that studies the nature, role, and impact of money and monetary institutions. It provides a framework for analyzing money and its core functions—as a medium of exchange, a store of value, and a unit of account—and examines how money can achieve widespread acceptance, including through its role as a public good.

Historically, monetary economics has both prefigured and remained closely integrated with the development of macroeconomics. The field investigates the functioning and regulation of different monetary systems, the design and role of financial institutions, and the international dimensions of monetary relations such as exchange rates and global liquidity.

Central themes in monetary economics include the analysis of inflation, the role of money supply in economic activity, the design and effectiveness of monetary policy, and the relationship between money, output, and employment. Research in this area provides the theoretical foundations for central banking and informs debates on issues such as currency regimes, financial stability, and the interaction between monetary and fiscal policy.

Modern analysis has attempted to provide microfoundations for the demand for money and to distinguish valid nominal and real monetary relationships for micro or macro uses, including their influence on the aggregate demand for output. Its methods include deriving and testing the implications of money as a substitute for other assets and as based on explicit frictions.

== History ==
=== Islamic Golden Age ===
At around the same time in the medieval Islamic world, a vigorous monetary economy was created during the 7th–12th centuries on the basis of the expanding levels of circulation of a stable high-value currency (the dinar). Innovations introduced by Muslim economists, traders and merchants include the earliest uses of credit, cheques, promissory notes, savings accounts, transactional accounts, loaning, trusts, exchange rates, the transfer of credit and debt, and banking institutions for loans and deposits.

=== 1500s to 1700s ===
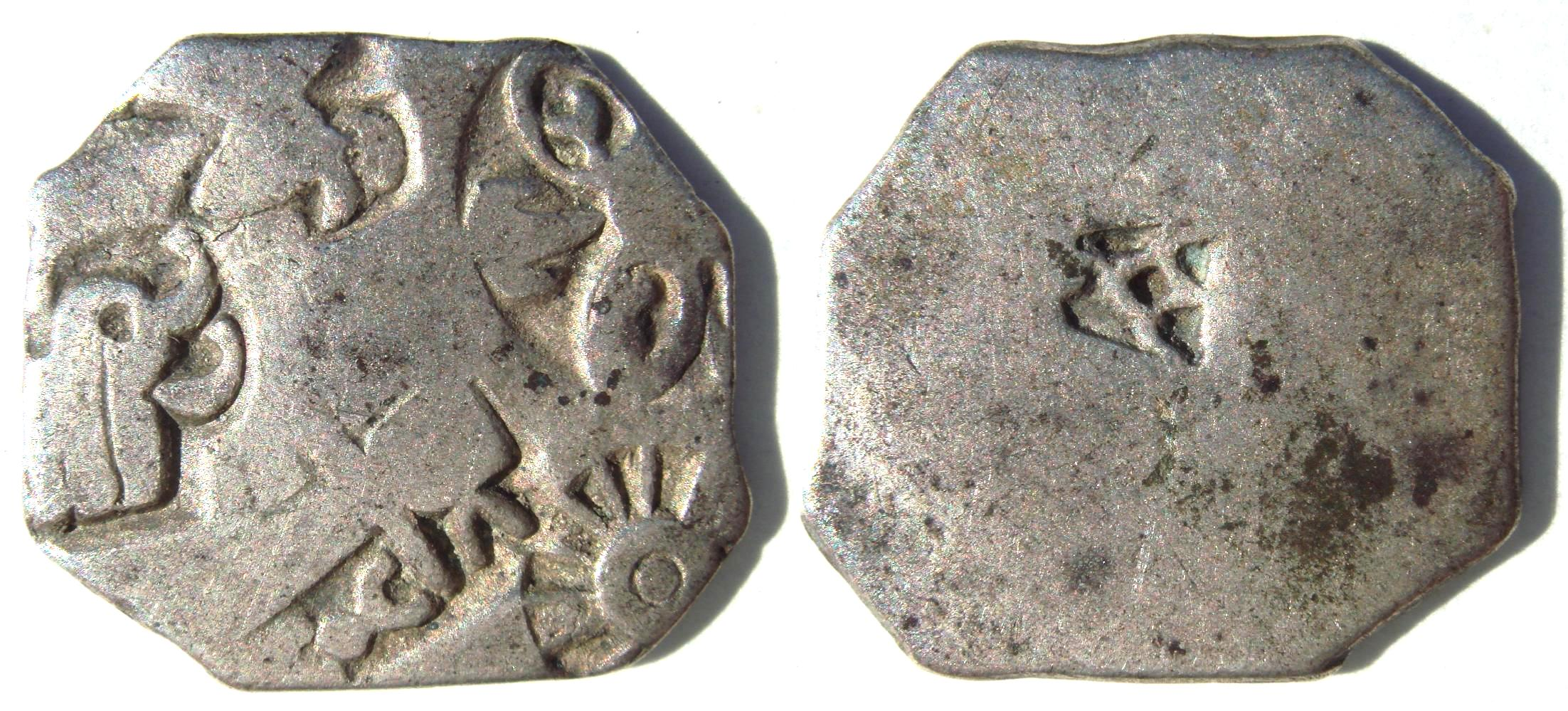
Silver coin of the Maurya Empire, known as rūpyarūpa, with symbols of wheel and elephant. 3rd century BC.

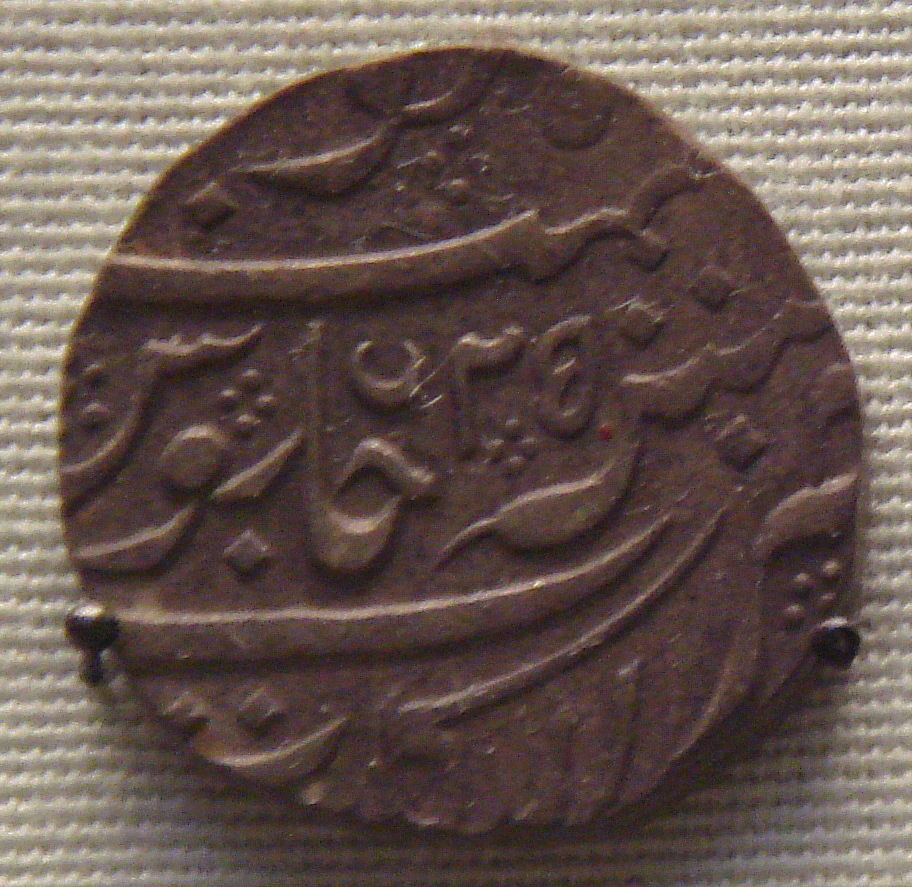
The French Indies Company issued rupees in the name of Muhammad Shah (1719–1748) for Northern India trade. This was cast in Pondicherry.

In the Indian subcontinent, Sher Shah Suri (1540–1545), introduced a silver coin called a rupiya, weighing 178 grams. Its use was continued by the Mughal rulers. The history of the rupee traces back to Ancient India circa 3rd century BC. Ancient India was one of the earliest issuers of coins in the world, along with the Lydian staters, several other Middle Eastern coinages and the Chinese wen. The term is from rūpya, a Sanskrit term for silver coin, from Sanskrit rūpa, beautiful form.

The imperial taka was officially introduced by the monetary reforms of Muhammad bin Tughluq, the emperor of the Delhi Sultanate, in 1329. It was modeled as representative money, a concept pioneered as paper money by the Mongols in China and Persia. The tanka was minted in copper and brass. Its value was exchanged with gold and silver reserves in the imperial treasury. The currency was introduced due to the shortage of metals.

Both the Kabuli rupee and the Kandahari rupee were used as currency in Afghanistan prior to 1891, when they were standardized as the Afghan rupee. The Afghan rupee, which was subdivided into 60 paisas, was replaced by the Afghan afghani in 1925.

Until the middle of the 20th century, Tibet's official currency was also known as the Tibetan rupee.

Serious interest in the concepts behind money occurred during the dramatic period of inflation in the late 15th to early 17th centuries known as the Price Revolution, during which the value of gold fell precipitously, sometimes fluctuating wildly, because of the importation of gold from the New World, primarily by Spain.

At the end of this period, the first modern texts on monetary economics were beginning to appear.

During the eighteenth century, the concept of banknotes became more common in Europe. David Hume referred to it as "this new invention of paper".

In 1705, John Law in Scotland published Money and Trade Considered, which examined the failure of metal-based money during the previous hundred and fifty years. He proposed replacing that system with a land bank system of paper money based on the value of real estate. He succeeded in getting this proposal implemented. However, his bank failed due to a bubble of speculation collapsing into extreme inflation; perhaps because he failed to take the lessons of the Spanish Price Revolution seriously.

In 1720, Isaac Gervaise wrote The System or Theory of the Trade of the World. He criticised mercantilism and state-supported credit for the inflation problems of his era.

Della Moneta, was published by Ferdinando Galiani in 1751, and is arguably the first modern text on economic theory. It was printed twenty-five years before Adam Smith's more famous book, The Wealth of Nations, which touched on some of the same topics. Della Moneta covered many modern monetary concepts, including the value, origin, and regulation of money. It carefully examined the possible causes for money's value to fluctuate.

The year following, 1752, Of the Balance of Trade was published by Hume. He argued that one need not worry about the import or export of goods creating a surplus or shortage of either money or goods because an excess or shortage of money will always increase or decrease demand until equilibrium is reached. In modern economic terms, this is as equilibration through the price–specie flow mechanism.

== Modern Theory of money ==
The foundational concept of any modern theory of money is the understanding that the value of fiat money depends upon exchange and not weight (compare with the Arrow–Debreu model).

== Research areas ==
Traditionally, research areas in monetary economics have included:

- Empirical determinants and measurement of the money supply, whether narrowly, broadly, or index-aggregated, in relation to economic activity
- Empirical determinants of the demand for money.
- Credit theory of money (also called debt theory of money), concerning the relationship between credit and money.
- Debt deflation and balance-sheet theories, which hypothesize that over-extension of credit associated with a subsequent asset-price fall generate business fluctuations through the wealth effect on net worth.
- Monetary aspects studied by central banks.
- The monetary/fiscal policy relationship to macroeconomic stability
- The effect of money supply growth on inflation.
- The political economy of financial regulation and monetary policy
- Monetary implications of the asset-price/macroeconomic relation: the quantity theory of money, monetarism, and the importance and stability of the relation between the money supply and interest rates, the price level, and nominal and real output of an economy.
- Monetary impacts on interest rates and the term structure of interest rates
- Lessons of monetary/financial history
- Transmission mechanisms of monetary policy as to the macroeconomy
- Neutrality of money vs. money illusion as to a change in the money supply, price level, or inflation on output
- Tests, testability, and implications of rational-expectations theory as to changes in output or inflation from monetary policy
- Monetary implications of imperfect and asymmetric information and fraudulent finance
- Game theory as a modeling paradigm for monetary and financial institutions
- Possible advantages of following a monetary-policy rule to avoid inefficiencies of time inconsistency from discretionary policy

== See also ==
- Chartalism – Heterodox theory of money
- Classical dichotomy – Idea that real and nominal variables can be analysed separately
- Currency crisis – Type of financial crisis
- Equation of exchange – Equation used on monetary theory
- Financial economics – Academic discipline concerned with the exchange of money
- Free banking – Economic system
- Horizontalism
- Liquidity preference – Interest seen as a reward for parting with liquidity
- Liquidity trap – Situation described in Keynesian economics
- Market monetarism – School of macroeconomic thought
- Modern Monetary Theory – Macroeconomic theory
- Monetarism – School of thought in monetary economics
- Monetary base – Measure of money supply
- Monetary-disequilibrium theory – Theory of macroeconomic fluctuations
- Monetary reform – Movements to amend the financial system
- Money creation – Process by which the money supply of an economic region is increased
- Money supply – Total value of money available in an economy at a specific point in time
- Systemic risk – Risk of collapse of an entire financial system or entire market
- Taylor rule – Rule from monetary policy
- The General Theory of Employment, Interest and Money – 1936 book by John Maynard Keynes
- The Theory of Money and Credit – 1912 book by Ludwig von Mises
- Velocity of money – Rate of money changing hands
- Welfare cost of inflation
