= Economic Notes =

Economic Notes Review of Banking, Finance and Monetary Economics
- Discipline: Economics
- Language: English

Publication details
- History: 1999–present
- Publisher: John Wiley & Sons
- Frequency: Biannual

Standard abbreviations
- ISO 4: Econ. Notes

Indexing
- ISSN: 0391-5026 (print); 1468-0300 (web)
- OCLC no.: 1105240901

Links
- Journal homepage; Online access

Economic Notes : Review of Banking, Finance and Monetary Economics is a biannual academic journal published by John Wiley & Sons. The journal was established in 1948. The journal publishes articles in the fields of banking, finance and monetary economics.
