= 1751 =

1751 in various calendars
- Gregorian calendar: 1751; MDCCLI
- Ab urbe condita: 2504
- Armenian calendar: 1200; ԹՎ ՌՄ
- Assyrian calendar: 6501
- Balinese saka calendar: 1672–1673
- Bengali calendar: 1157–1158
- Berber calendar: 2701
- British Regnal year: 24 Geo. 2 – 25 Geo. 2
- Buddhist calendar: 2295
- Burmese calendar: 1113
- Byzantine calendar: 7259–7260
- Chinese calendar: 庚午年 (Metal Horse); 4448 or 4241 — to — 辛未年 (Metal Goat); 4449 or 4242
- Coptic calendar: 1467–1468
- Discordian calendar: 2917
- Ethiopian calendar: 1743–1744
- Hebrew calendar: 5511–5512
- Hindu calendars
- Vikram Samvat: 1807–1808
- Shaka Samvat: 1672–1673
- Kali Yuga: 4851–4852
- Holocene calendar: 11751
- Igbo calendar: 751–752
- Iranian calendar: 1129–1130
- Islamic calendar: 1164–1165
- Japanese calendar: Kan'en 4 / Hōreki 1 (宝暦元年)
- Javanese calendar: 1675–1677
- Julian calendar: Gregorian minus 11 days
- Korean calendar: 4084
- Minguo calendar: 161 before ROC 民前161年
- Nanakshahi calendar: 283
- Thai solar calendar: 2293–2294
- Tibetan calendar: ལྕགས་ཕོ་རྟ་ལོ་ (male Iron-Horse); 1877 or 1496 or 724 — to — ལྕགས་མོ་ལུག་ལོ་ (female Iron-Sheep); 1878 or 1497 or 725

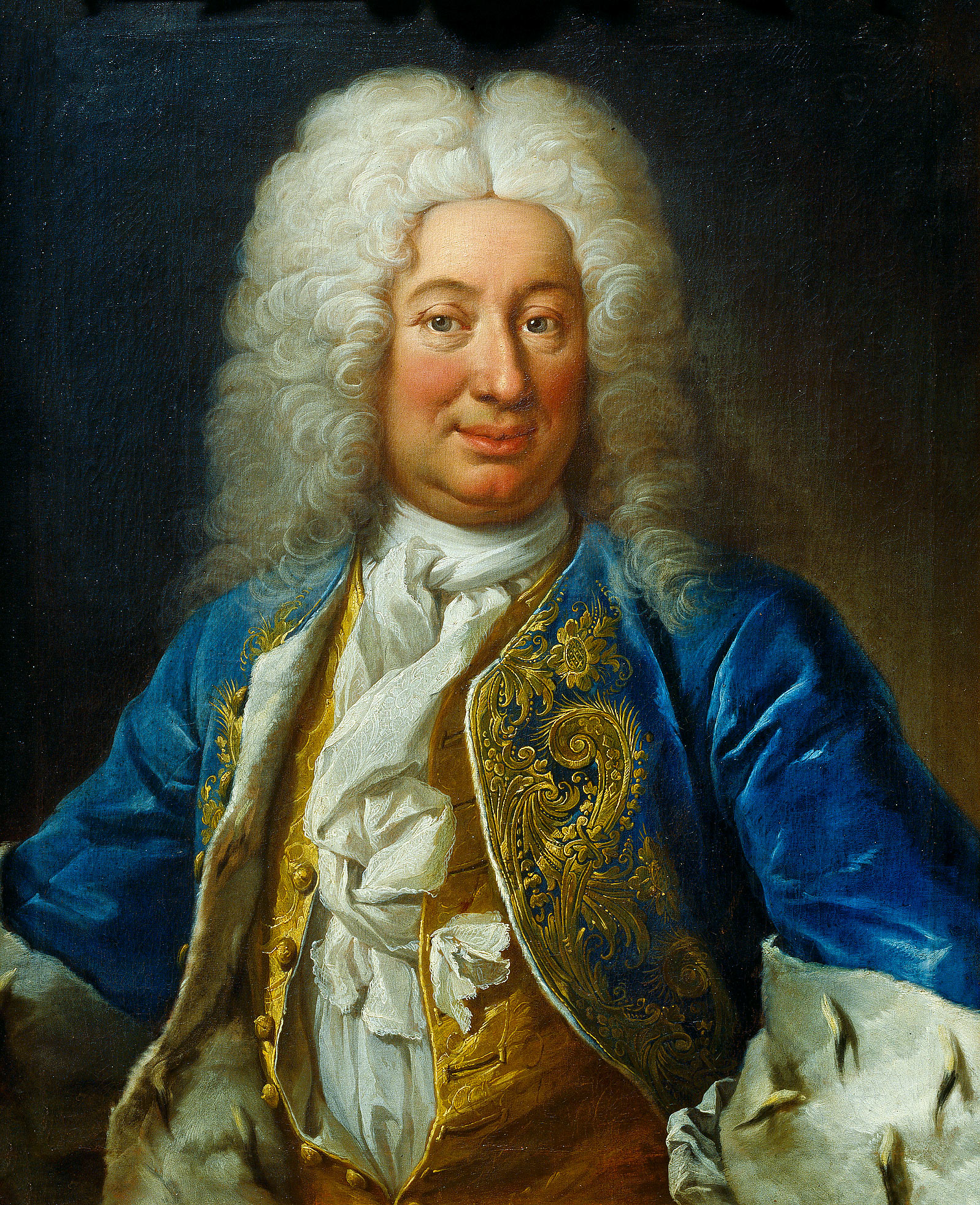
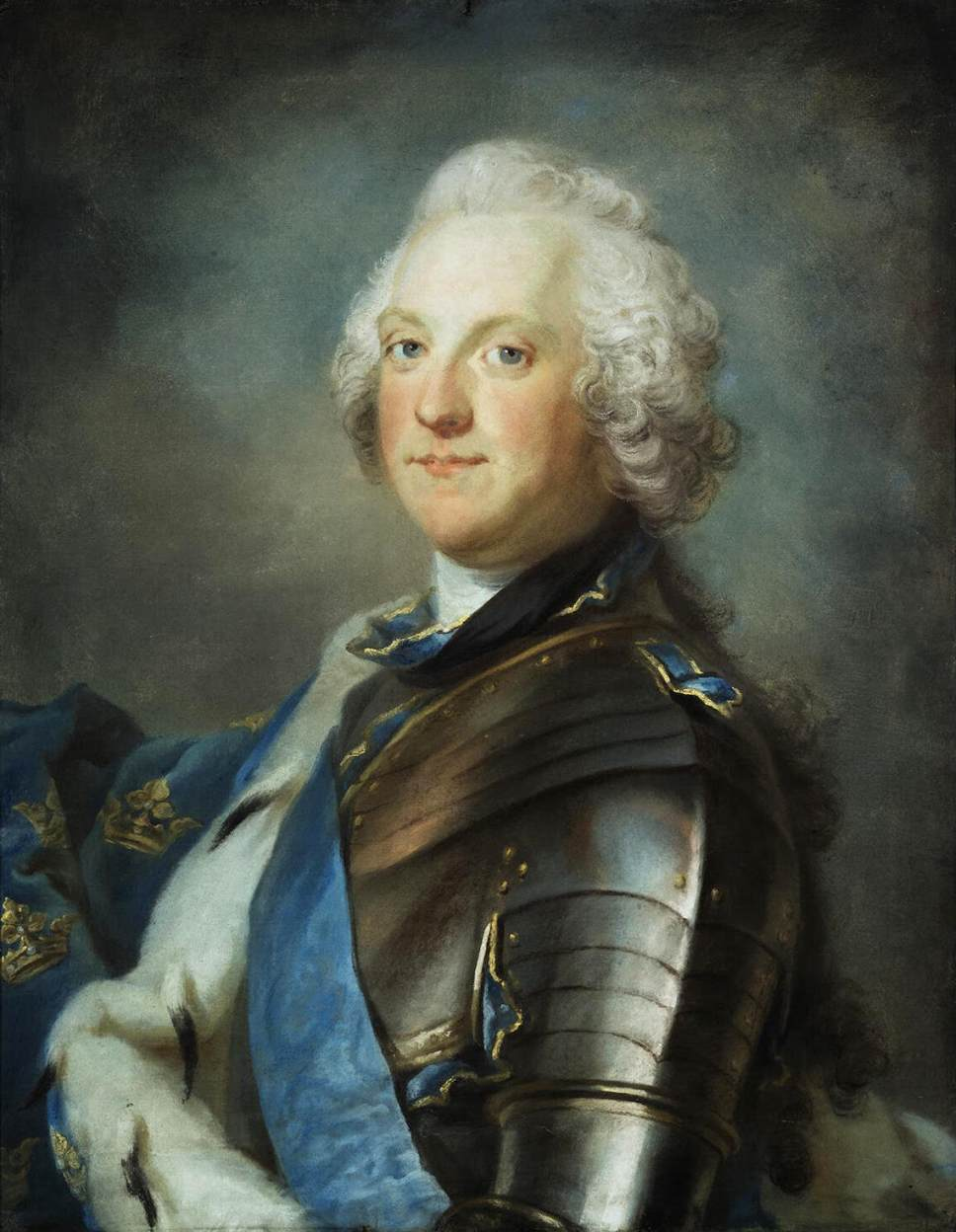
April 5: King Frederik of Sweden dies, King Adolf Frederik becomes new ruler

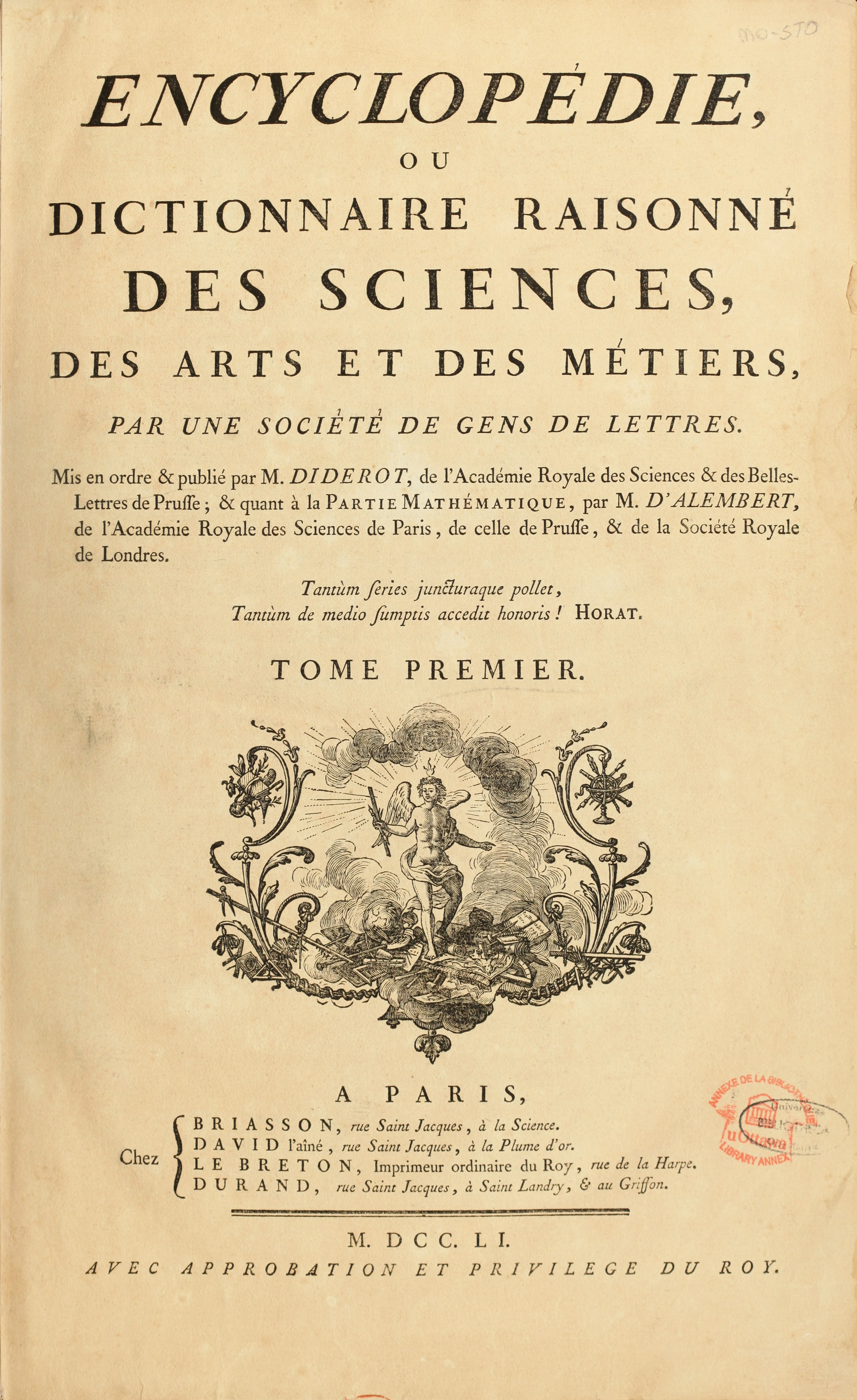
The Encyclopédie is first published.

1751 (MDCCLI) was a common year starting on Friday of the Gregorian calendar and a common year starting on Tuesday of the Julian calendar, the 1751st year of the Common Era (CE) and Anno Domini (AD) designations, the 751st year of the 2nd millennium, the 51st year of the 18th century, and the 2nd year of the 1750s decade. As of the start of 1751, the Gregorian calendar was 11 days ahead of the Julian calendar, which remained in localized use until 1923.

In Britain and its colonies (except Scotland), (Note: Scotland had already moved its New Year's Day from 25 March to 1 January, with effect from 1 January 1600) the year 1751 began on 25 March as usual, (Note: The preceding January, February and most of March were the last quarter of 1750) but ended it on 31 December (rather than nearly three months later according to its previous rule) and had only 282 days. This was due to the Calendar (New Style) Act 1750 (by which it adopted the Gregorian calendar).

== Events ==
=== January–March ===
- January 1 – As the Province of Georgia undergoes the transition from a trustee-operated territory to a Crown colony, the prohibition against slavery is lifted by the Trustees for the Establishment of the Colony of Georgia in America. At the time, the Black population of Georgia is approximately 400 people, who had been kept in slavery in violation of the law. By 1790, the enslaved population of Georgia increases to over 29,000 and to 462,000 by 1860.
- January 7 – The University of Pennsylvania, conceived 12 years earlier by Benjamin Franklin and its other trustees to provide non-denominational higher education "to train young people for leadership in business, government and public service". rather than for the ministry, holds its first classes as "The Academy and Charitable School in the Province of Pennsylvania" in Philadelphia.
- January 13 – For the first time, the American colony in Georgia has an elected legislature after having been administered by a corporate Board of Trustees since its founding in 1732. The original Georgia Assembly meets in Savannah with 16 representatives as the colony prepares to become a British colonial province. After electing Francis Harris as the Speaker of the unicameral Assembly, the delegates successfully ask the Trustees not to surrender control of Georgia to the neighboring Province of South Carolina.
- January 18 – In the aftermath of the Lhasa riot of 1750, Chinese General Ban Di arrives at the capital of Tibet on behalf of the Qianlong Emperor and the seven imprisoned leaders of the rebellion are turned over to his custody by the 7th Dalai Lama, Keizang Gyatzo. General Ban Di guides the interrogation under torture of rebel leader Lobsang Trashi and, after five days orders the beheading and dismemberment of the seven rebels.
- February 14 – At Lakkireddipalle in southeastern India, the new Nizam of Hyderabad, Subhadar Muzaffar Jang, leads an invasion of cavalry against the small kingdom of Kurnool and is confronted by its monarch, the Nawab Bahadur Khan. The Subhadar and the Nawab order their soldiers to stand down and then engage in hand-to-hand combat, during which the Nawab "thrust[s] a spear into the Subhadar's brain" before he is "himself hacked to pieces."
- February 16 – English poet Thomas Gray first publishes Elegy Written in a Country Churchyard, anonymously in The Magazine of Magazines. The poem becomes more popularly known as "Gray's Elegy".
- February 18 – As the Governor of French Louisiana, Pierre de Rigaud, the Marquis de Vaudreuil, issues the first police regulations for New Orleans in an attempt to combat crime in that city.
- March 25 – For the last time, New Year's Day is legally on March 25, in England and Wales and "in all his Majesty's Dominions in Europe, Asia, Africa and America" due to the Calendar (New Style) Act 1750. The months of January 1751, February 1751 and most of March 1751 did not exist in British territories: those months were recorded as the last three of 1750 according to the Old Style dating system; the equivalent months a year later were recorded as the first three of 1752 under the New Style system.
- March 31 – Frederick, Prince of Wales, heir-apparent to the British throne, dies of a pulmonary embolism at the age of 44 after a game of cricket. His 12-year-old son, Prince George, becomes the heir-apparent and will later become King George III. Frederick's widow Augusta of Saxe-Gotha becomes Dowager Princess of Wales.

=== April–June ===
- April 5 – Sweden's King Frederick I dies at the age of 74 (March 25 on the Julian calendar, which remains in effect in Sweden and Finland until 1753), after a reign of 31 years, bringing an end to the rule of Sweden by the House of Hesse because he has no legitimate heirs. Prince Adolf Frederick of the House of Holstein-Gottorp, who had been elected as the crown prince in 1743, becomes the new King.
- April 19 – The Qianlong Emperor of China visits the southern capital of Nanjing for the first time, bringing with him 3,000 staff and 6,690 horses and stays for four days.
- April 20 – A month after the death of his father, 12-year old Prince George William Frederick is formally invested as the new Prince of Wales. Nine years later, Prince George becomes King George III upon the death of his grandfather, King George II.
- April 29 – The sport of cricket is first played in the American colonies, as a team of New Yorkers plays against a team of Englishmen and defeats them, 167 to 80, in a match in Greenwich Village.
- May 11 – The Pennsylvania Hospital, first hospital in the American colonies, is chartered in Philadelphia by the Pennsylvania legislature, which grants the right to Benjamin Franklin and to Dr. Thomas Bond.
- May 27 (May 13 Old Style) – Adoption of the Gregorian calendar: Royal assent is given to An Act for Regulating the Commencement of the Year; and for Correcting the Calendar now in Use (the "Calendar Act") passed by the Parliament of Great Britain, introducing the Gregorian Calendar, correcting the eleven-day difference between Old Style and New Style dates and making 1 January legally New Year's Day from 1752 in the British Empire. It is largely promoted by George Parker, 2nd Earl of Macclesfield.
- June 14 – The colony of South Carolina reverses a 10-year-old law that had imposed a tax of 100 pounds sterling on the purchase of imported African slaves, and reduces the tax to £10. The move effectively restores the slave trade to the colony.
- June 28 – The first volume of Denis Diderot's Encyclopédie, ou dictionnaire raisonné des sciences, des arts et des métiers, often referred to as le Encyclopédie, is published

=== July–September ===
- July 28 – Battle of Kirkhbulakh: The Kingdom of Kartli defeats a large army of the Tabriz Khanate, under Erekle II.
- July 31 – Fire destroys 1,000 houses in Stockholm.
- August 13 – The Academy and College of Philadelphia, predecessor to the private University of Pennsylvania, opens its doors, with Benjamin Franklin as president.
- September 13 – Kalvária Banská Štiavnica in the Kingdom of Hungary is completed.

=== October–December ===
- October 22 – William V, Prince of Orange, the three-year-old son of the late William IV, becomes the last Stadtholder of the Dutch Republic. During his minority, his mother, Princess Anne, acts as regent until her death in 1759. Upon becoming of age in 1766, he will have a corrupt reign as the Republic's head of state until the office is abolished on February 23, 1785.
- October 27 – The Hōreki period begins in Japan.
- November 14 – The 50-day long siege of the British fort of Trichinopoly (now Tiruchirappalli) in southern India is broken when the defenders use musket fire to force a stampede of the elephants of the French-backed troops of Chanda Sahib.
- November 17
  - Future United States President George Washington becomes seriously ill with smallpox while he and his older brother Lawrence are visiting the island of Barbados during an epidemic Washington, 19 years old, survives the virus but is bedridden for almost a month.
  - The Pima Revolt begins in the area that now includes the Mexican state of Sonora and the U.S. state of Arizona, as Pima Indian leader Luis Oacpicagigua carries out the massacre of 18 Spanish settlers at Oacpicagigua's home in Sáric. The rebellion, which takes the lives of more than 100 Spaniards, is ended on March 18 after Governor Diego Ortiz Parilla permits the rebels to surrender for imprisonment.
- November 26 – Adolf Frederick is formally crowned as the King of Sweden. The coronation ceremony takes place almost eight months after he assumed the throne.
- November 29 – The Cherokee nation signs a treaty with British colonial authorities at the close of the two-week Charlestown Conference in Charleston, South Carolina, with Governor James Glen signing an agreement with Cherokee war chiefs led by the "Old Skiagunsta" of Keowee, the Raven of Hiwasee, Old Caesar of Chatuga and Kittagusta of Joree.
- December 3 – Battle of Arnee in India (Second Carnatic War): A British East India Company–led force under Robert Clive defeats and routs a much larger Franco-Indian army, under the command of Raza Sahib, at Arni.
- December 14 – The Theresian Military Academy is founded in Wiener Neustadt, Austria.

=== Date unknown ===
- Zand Iran is established by Karim Khan Zand.
- In the University of Glasgow (Scotland):
  - Adam Smith is appointed professor of logic.
  - The Medical School is founded.
- Ferdinando Galiani publishes the first modern economic analysis, Della Moneta.
- Swedish naturalist Carl Linnaeus publishes his Philosophia Botanica, the first textbook of descriptive systematic botanical taxonomy, and the first appearance of his binomial nomenclature.
- 1751–1775 – 13 per cent of appointees to audiencias in the Spanish Empire are Creoles.

== Births ==
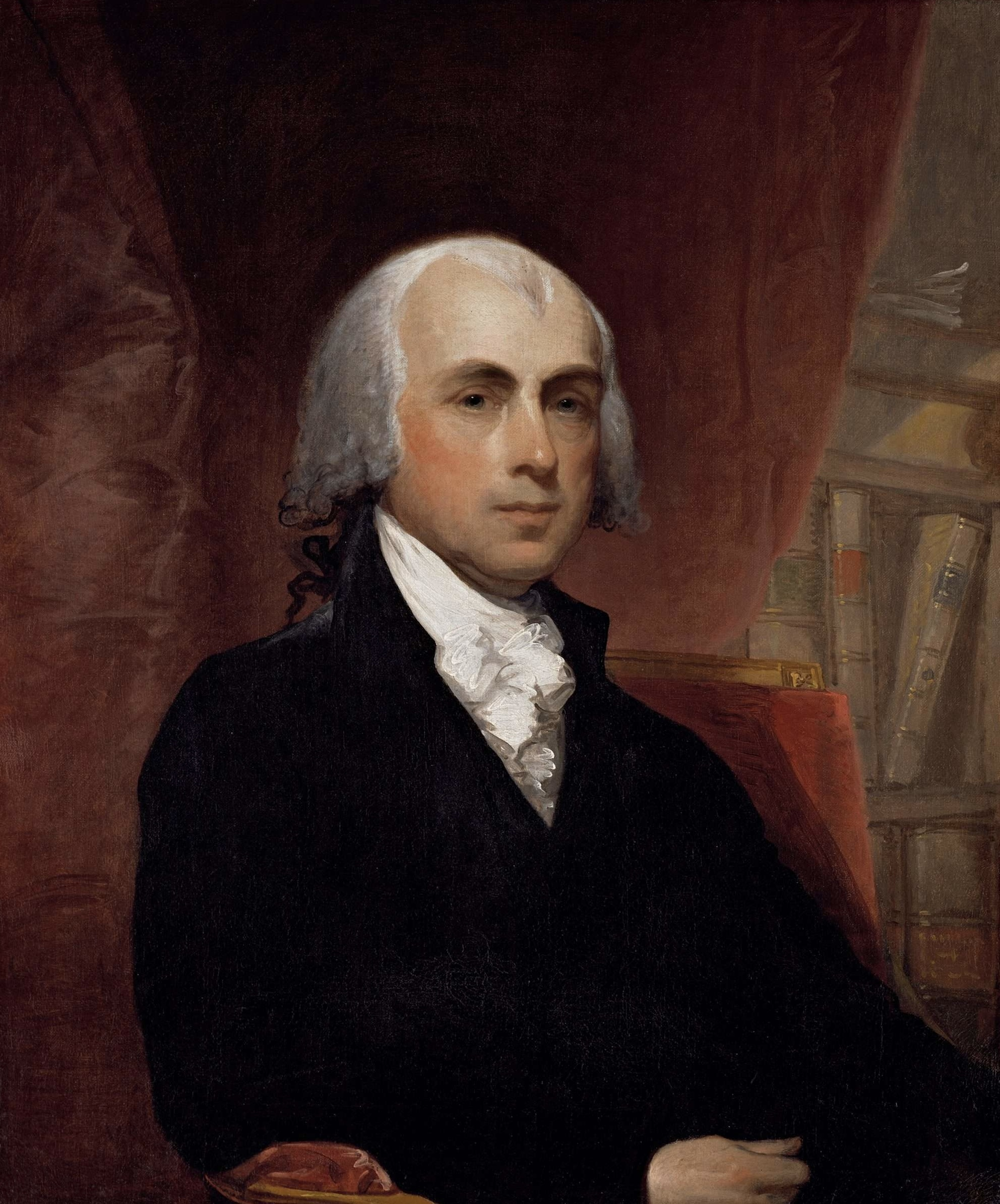
James Madison

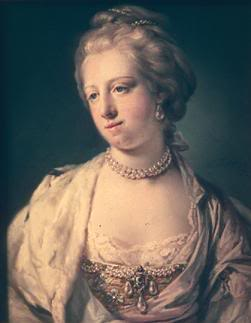
Caroline Matilda

- January 12 – Ferdinand I of the Two Sicilies (d. 1825)
- February 15 – Johann Heinrich Wilhelm Tischbein, German painter (d. 1829)
- February 20 – Johann Heinrich Voss, German poet (d. 1826)
- March 1 – Armand-Marie-Jacques de Chastenet, Marquis of Puységur, French mesmerist (d. 1825)
- March 9 – Maria Antonia Fernandez, Spanish flamenco singer, dancer (d. 1787)
- March 16 – James Madison, fourth President of the United States (d. 1836)
- April 5 – Marie-Aimée Lullin, Swiss entomologist (d. 1822)
- May 7 – Stephen Badlam, American artisan and military officer (d. 1815)
- May 24 – Charles Emmanuel IV of Savoy, King of Sardinia (d. 1819)
- June 4 – John Scott, 1st Earl of Eldon, Lord Chancellor of Great Britain (d. 1838)
- June 17 – Joshua Humphreys, American naval architect (d. 1838)
- June 23 – Gregoria Apaza, Bolivian indigenous leader (d. 1782)
- July 11 – Caroline Matilda, British princess, queen consort of Denmark (d. 1775)
- July 29 – Elisabetta Caminèr Turra, Venetian writer (d. 1796)
- July 30 – Maria Anna Mozart ("Nannerl"), Austrian musician and composer, sister of Wolfgang Amadeus Mozart (d. 1829)
- September 1 – Emanuel Schikaneder, German dramatist, actor and singer (d. 1812)
- September 5 – François Joseph Westermann, French Revolutionary leader, general (d. 1794)
- October 30 – Richard Brinsley Sheridan, Irish dramatist, politician (d. 1816)
- date unknown
  - Charlotta Richardy, Swedish industrialist (d. 1831)
  - Thomas Sheraton, English furniture designer (d. 1806)

== Deaths ==
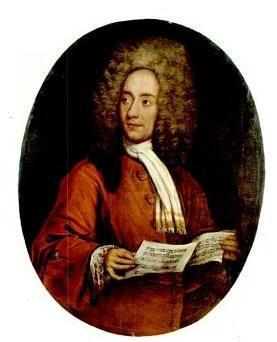
Tomaso Albinoni

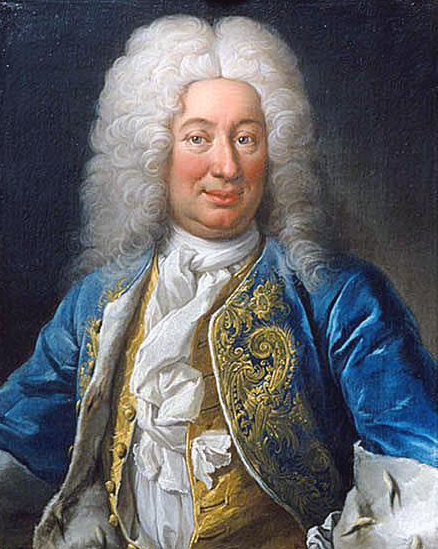
King Frederick I of Sweden

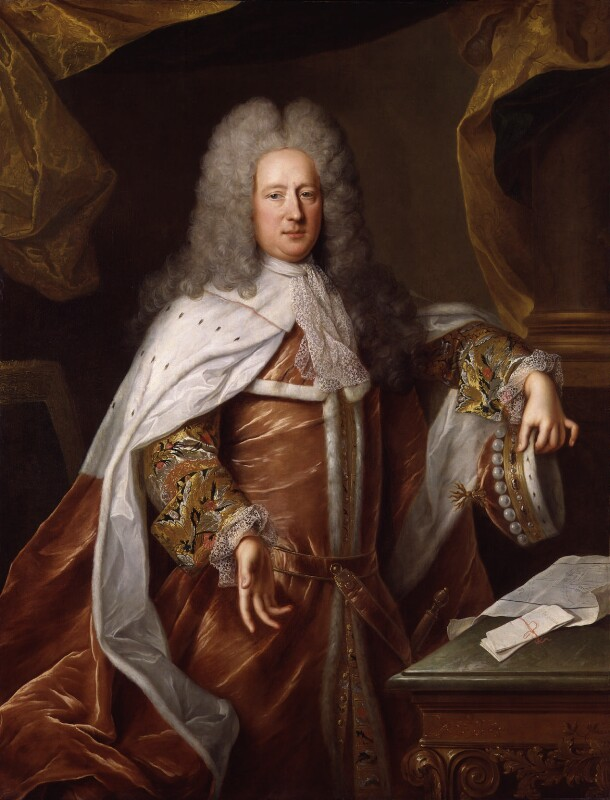
Henry St John, 1st Viscount Bolingbroke

- January 17 – Tomaso Albinoni, Italian composer (b. 1671)
- January 20 – John Hervey, 1st Earl of Bristol, English politician (b. 1665)
- January 25 – Paul Dudley, Massachusetts Attorney-General (b. 1675)
- January 29 – Martin Knutzen, German philosopher (b. 1713)
- February 5 – Henri François d'Aguesseau, Chancellor of France (b. 1668)
- February 7 – Albert Borgard, Danish artillery and engineer officer (b. 1659)
- March 21 – Johann Heinrich Zedler, German publisher (b. 1706)
- March 24 – János Pálffy, Hungarian field marshal, Palatine (b. 1664)
- March 25 – King Frederick I of Sweden (b. 1676)
- March 29 – Thomas Coram, English sea captain, philanthropist (b. c. 1668)
- March 31 – Frederick, Prince of Wales, Hanoverian-born heir to the British throne (b. 1707)
- April 19 – Peter Lacy, Irish-born Russian field marshal (b. 1678)
- April 20 – Gisela Agnes of Anhalt-Köthen, Princess of Anhalt-Köthen by birth and by marriage Princess of Anhalt-Dessau (b. 1722)
- May 20 – Domènec Terradellas, Spanish opera composer (b. 1713)
- June 9 – John Machin, English mathematician (b. c.1686)
- June 20 – Adriaan Valckenier, Dutch Governor-General of the Dutch East Indies (1737–1741) (b. 1695)
- August 18 – Samuel von Schmettau, Prussian field marshal (b. 1684)
- August 22 – Andrew Gordon, British physicist (b. 1712)
- August 30 – Christopher Polhem, Swedish scientist (b. 1661)
- October 22 – William IV, Prince of Orange, Stadtholder of the Dutch Republic (b. 1711)
- October 26 – Philip Doddridge, English nonconformist religious leader (b. 1702)
- November 18 – Abraham Vater, German anatomist (b. 1684)
- December 12 – Henry St John, 1st Viscount Bolingbroke, English statesman, philosopher (b. 1678)
- December 16 – Leopold II, Prince of Anhalt-Dessau, Prussian general (b. 1700)
- December 19 – Louise of Great Britain, queen of Frederick V of Denmark (b. 1724)
- December 29 – Charles, Count of Armagnac, French noble (b. 1684)
