= Of the Balance of Trade =

1752 economic text by David Hume

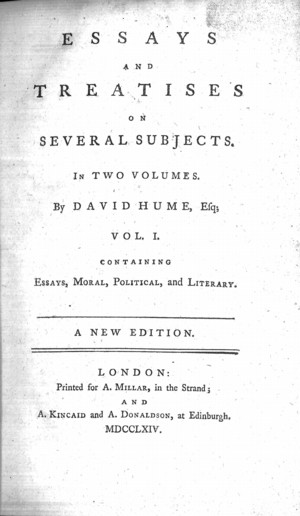
- Author: David Hume
- Language: English
- Genre: Economics, Philosophy
- Publication date: 1752
- Publication place: Scotland

Of the Balance of Trade is an economic text on monetary economics that was written by David Hume and published in 1752. In the book, Hume examines various mistakes committed by nations regarding trade and suggests better alternatives. The thought experiments that Hume uses in the book are sometimes argued by modern economists to be the first formal economic models.

== Argument ==
Hume starts out with an important point that touches upon a key fact of economics that many fail to recognize even in the 21st century: allowing the sale or export of a good actually increases its production. Economic activity in trade is not a fixed-slice pie but one in which freedom to trade can create more, rather than less:

It is very usual, in nations ignorant of the nature of commerce, to prohibit the exportation of commodities, and to preserve among themselves whatever they think valuable and useful. They do not consider, that, in this prohibition, they act directly contrary to their intention; and that the more is exported of any commodity, the more will be raised at home, of which they themselves will always have the first offer.

He uses, as example, the "ridiculous" behaviour of the ancient Athenian government in banning the export of a certain kind of fig deemed too delicious for mere foreigners, but he goes on to cite similar errors in contemporary England and France, as well.

In modern economic terms, that is equilibration through the price-specie flow mechanism. In other words, money moves around where it is needed and forever seeks a balance.

That means that a country does not need to limit exports or even imports because the money flowing out of the economy creates more demand for money, which helps to bring it back in.

== Impact ==
Hume's essay is the first known establishment of the concept of the Price-Specie Flow Mechanism. Perhaps still the best, it was cited by Paul Krugman and John Maynard Keynes on one end of the political spectrum and by Austrian economists on the other.
