= Alberto Marghieri =

Italian jurist (1852–1937)

Alberto Marghieri (1852–1937) was an Italian jurist and author of a biography about Ferdinando Galiani. He was born in Naples, where he made his career in law and politics. In 1924, he was nominated to the Senate of Italy.

== Bibliography ==
- L'Abate Galiani (1878)
