= Isaac Gervaise =

English merchant and economist

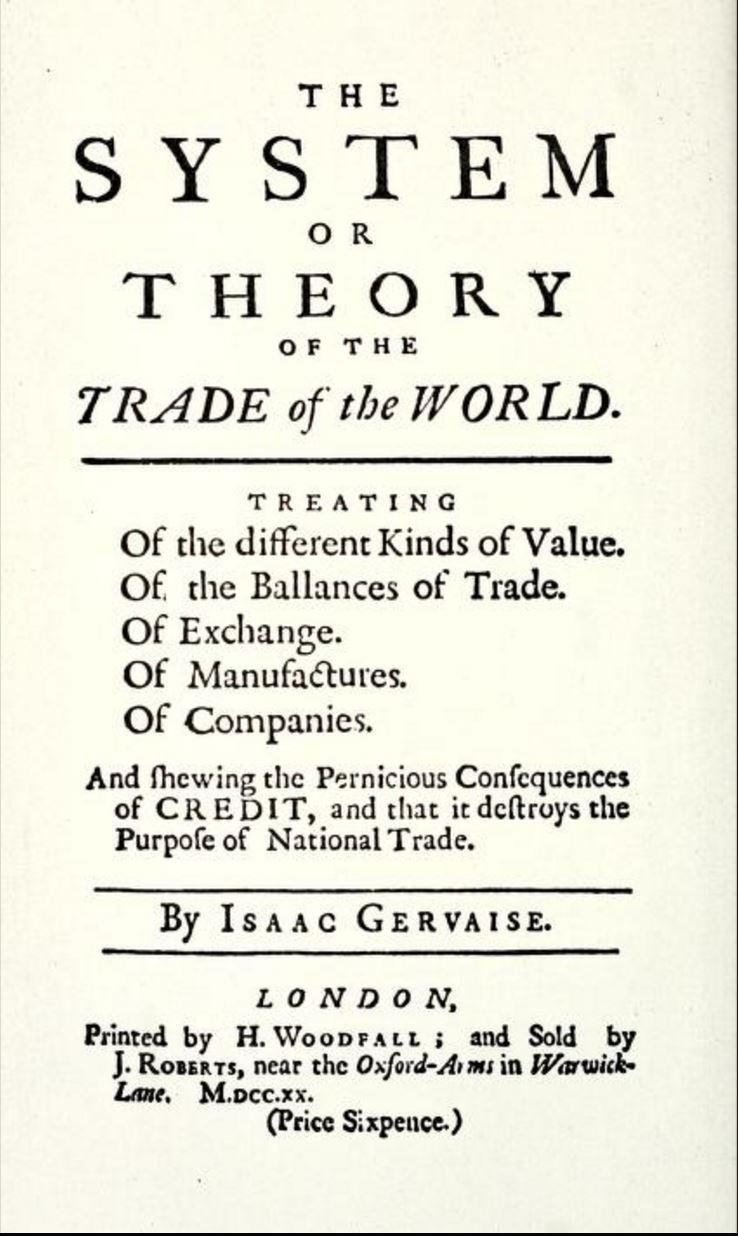
Gervaise wrote a prototypical examination of monetary theory in 1720

Isaac Gervaise (born ca. 1680 in Paris, died 1739) was an English merchant and economist.

Gervaise was of a Huguenot family which fled to England in 1681. He was granted naturalization in 1698, and in 1699 became Elder and Secretary of Consistoire in Church of Leicester Fields. In 1720 he published The System or Theory of the Trade of the World, one of the first treatises on political economy.
