= Jaime de la Té y Sagau =

Spanish composer

Jaime de la Té y Sagau (1684 in Barcelona – 1735 in Lisbon) was a Spanish composer active at the court of King João V in Lisbon.

== Works, editions and recordings ==
- Cantata "Tiorba Cristalina"
- Cantata a Santa Maria
