= 1750 =

1750 in various calendars
- Gregorian calendar: 1750; MDCCL
- Ab urbe condita: 2503
- Armenian calendar: 1199; ԹՎ ՌՃՂԹ
- Assyrian calendar: 6500
- Balinese saka calendar: 1671–1672
- Bengali calendar: 1156–1157
- Berber calendar: 2700
- British Regnal year: 23 Geo. 2 – 24 Geo. 2
- Buddhist calendar: 2294
- Burmese calendar: 1112
- Byzantine calendar: 7258–7259
- Chinese calendar: 己巳年 (Earth Snake); 4447 or 4240 — to — 庚午年 (Metal Horse); 4448 or 4241
- Coptic calendar: 1466–1467
- Discordian calendar: 2916
- Ethiopian calendar: 1742–1743
- Hebrew calendar: 5510–5511
- Hindu calendars
- Vikram Samvat: 1806–1807
- Shaka Samvat: 1671–1672
- Kali Yuga: 4850–4851
- Holocene calendar: 11750
- Igbo calendar: 750–751
- Iranian calendar: 1128–1129
- Islamic calendar: 1163–1164
- Japanese calendar: Kan'en 3 (寛延３年)
- Javanese calendar: 1674–1675
- Julian calendar: Gregorian minus 11 days
- Korean calendar: 4083
- Minguo calendar: 162 before ROC 民前162年
- Nanakshahi calendar: 282
- Thai solar calendar: 2292–2293
- Tibetan calendar: ས་མོ་སྦྲུལ་ལོ་ (female Earth-Snake); 1876 or 1495 or 723 — to — ལྕགས་ཕོ་རྟ་ལོ་ (male Iron-Horse); 1877 or 1496 or 724

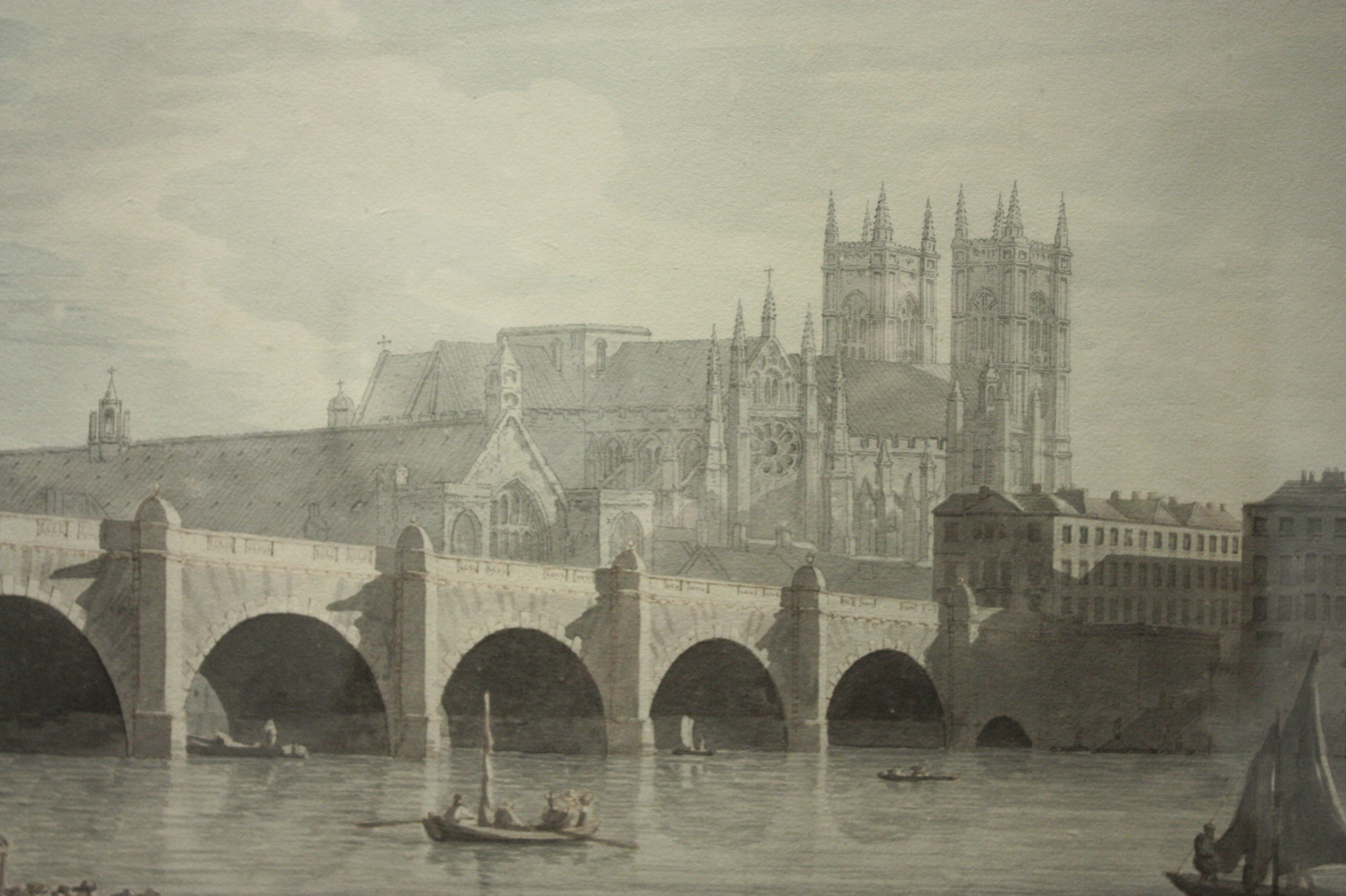
November 18: Westminster Bridge is dedicated in London.

1750 (MDCCL) was a common year starting on Thursday of the Gregorian calendar and a common year starting on Monday of the Julian calendar, the 1750th year of the Common Era (CE) and Anno Domini (AD) designations, the 750th year of the 2nd millennium, the 50th year of the 18th century, and the 1st year of the 1750s decade. As of the start of 1750, the Gregorian calendar was 11 days ahead of the Julian calendar, which remained in localized use until 1923.

Various sources, including the Intergovernmental Panel on Climate Change, use the year 1750 as a baseline year for the end of the pre-industrial era.

1750 is commemorated as the year that started the Industrial Revolution, although the underpinnings of the Industrial Revolution could have started earlier.

== Events ==
=== January–March ===
- January 13 – The Treaty of Madrid between Spain and Portugal authorizes a larger Brazil than had the Treaty of Tordesillas of 1494, which originally established the boundaries of the Portuguese and Spanish territories in South America.
- January 24 – A fire in Istanbul destroys 10,000 homes.
- February 15 – After Spain and Portugal agree that the Uruguay River will be the boundary line between the two kingdoms' territory in South America, the Spanish Governor orders the Jesuits to vacate seven Indian missions along the river (San Angel, San Nicolas, San Luis, San Lorenzo, San Miguel, San Juan and San Borja).
- March 5 – The Murray-Kean Company, a troupe of actors from Philadelphia, gives the first performance of a play announced in advance in a newspaper, presenting Richard III at New York City's Nassau Street Theatre.
- March 20 – The first number of Samuel Johnson's The Rambler appears.

=== April–June ===
- April 7 – Maveeran Alagumuthu Kone, a polygar in Tamil Nadu, raises slogans and launches a rebellion against Company rule in India due to his opposition to the East India Company's tax collection policies.
- April 13 – Dr. Thomas Walker and five other men (Ambrose Powell, Colby Chew, William Tomlinson, Henry Lawless and John Hughes) cross through the Cumberland Gap, a mountain pass through the Appalachian Mountains, to become the first white people to venture into territories that had been inhabited exclusively by various Native American tribes. On April 17, Walker's party continues through what is now Kentucky and locates the Cumberland River, which Walker names in honor of Prince William, Duke of Cumberland.
- April 14
  - A group of enslaved West African, bound for the Americas, successfully overpowers the crew of the British slaver ship Snow Ann, imprisons the survivors, and then navigates the vessel back to Cape Lopez in Gabon. Upon regaining their freedom, the rebels leave the survivors on the Gabonese coast.
  - The Viceroy of New Spain, Juan Francisco de Güemes, issues a notice to the missionaries in Nuevo Santander (which includes parts of what are now the U.S. state of Texas, including San Antonio, and the Mexican state of Tamaulipas) to work peacefully to convert the indigenous Karankawa people to Roman Catholicism.
- April 25 – The Acadian settlement in Beaubassin, Nova Scotia, is burnt by the French army, and the population is forcibly relocated, after France and Great Britain agree that the Missaguash River should be the new boundary between peninsular British Nova Scotia and the mainland remnant of French Acadia (now New Brunswick).
- May 16 – Two weeks after police in Paris arrest six teenagers for gambling in the suburb of Saint-Laurent, rioting breaks out when a rumor spreads that plainclothes policemen are hauling off small children between the ages of five and ten years old, in order to provide blood to an ailing aristocrat. Over the next two weeks, rioting breaks out in other sections of Paris. Police are attacked, including one who is beaten to death by the mob, until order is restored and police reforms are announced.
- June 19 – At a time when mountain climbing is still relatively uncommon, Eggert Ólafsson and Bjarni Pálsson scale their first peak, the 4,892 foot (1,491 m) high Icelandic volcano, Hekla.
- June 24 – Parliament passes Britain's Iron Act, designed to restrict American manufactured goods by prohibiting additional ironworking businesses from producing finished goods. At the same time, import taxes on raw iron from America are lifted in order to give British manufacturers additional material for production. By 1775, the North American colonies have surpassed England and Wales in iron production and have become the world's third largest producer of iron.
- June 29 – An attempt in Lima to begin a native uprising against Spanish colonial authorities in the Viceroyalty of Peru is discovered and thwarted. One of the conspirators, Francisco Garcia Jimenez, escapes to Huarochirí and kills dozens of Spaniards on July 25.

=== July–September ===
- July 9 – Traveller Jonas Hanway leaves St. Petersburg to return home, via Germany and the Netherlands. Later the same year, Hanway reputedly becomes the first Englishman to use an umbrella (a French fashion).
- July 11 – Halifax, Nova Scotia is almost completely destroyed by fire.
- July 31 – José I takes over the throne of Portugal from his deceased father, João V. King José Manuel appoints the Marquis of Pombal as his Chief Minister, who then strips the Inquisition of its power.
- August 8 – In advance of the Province of Georgia changing in status from a corporate-owned American settlement to a British colony, Royal Assent is given to an act that lifts the province's ban on slavery; effective January 1, "it shall and may be lawful to import or bring Black Slaves or Negroes in to the Province of Georgia of America and to keep and to use the same therein".
- August 20 – French astronomer Nicolas-Louis de Lacaille, by way of the Foreign Minister, the Marquis de Puisieulx and Netherlands ambassador to Paris Mattheus Lestevenon, sends a letter that ultimately persuades the States-General of the Dutch Republic to allow and partially finance Lacaille's stellar trigonometry mission to the Cape of Good Hope. The expedition departs Lorient on October 21.
- September 30 – Crispus Attucks, an enslaved African-American who will later become the first person killed in the Boston Massacre of 1770, escapes from the Framingham, Massachusetts estate of slaveowner William Brown. In an unsuccessful attempt to recapture the fugitive, Brown runs an advertisement on October 2 in the Boston Gazette, but Attucks eludes recapture.

=== October–December ===
- October 5 – Treaty of Madrid: Spain and Great Britain sign a treaty temporarily eliminating their hostility over their colonies in North and South America. In addition to both sides dropping their claims for damages against each other, Spain agrees to pay the South Sea Company £100,000 for damage claims.
- October 14 – The Louvre Museum is created in Paris four years after art critic Lafond de Saint-Yenne calls on the King to allow the display of the royal art collection to the general public. Abel-François Poisson, the Marquis de Marigny, arranges for the display of 110 of the Crown's paintings at the Palais du Luxembourg.
- November 11 – A riot breaks out in Lhasa after the murder of the regent of Tibet.
- November 18 – Westminster Bridge is officially opened in London.
- December 3 – What is described later as "The first documented presentation of a musical in New York" takes place one block east of Broadway, at the Nassau Street Theatre, when a resident company of actors stages The Beggar's Opera.
- December 25 – Prussia and Russia break off diplomatic relations after the Russians refuse to stop assisting the Electorate of Saxony. Five years later, the two Empires fight the Seven Years' War.
- December 29 – Two physicians in Jamaica, Dr. John Williams and Dr. Parker Bennet, fight a duel "with swords and pistols" after having had an argument the day before about the treatment of bilious fever. Both are mortally wounded during the fight.

=== Date unknown ===
- Hannah Snell reveals her sex to her Royal Marines compatriots.
- The King of Dahomey has income of 250,000 pounds from the overseas export of enslaved people.
- Maruyama Okyo paints The Ghost of Oyuki.
- Britain produces c. 2% of the entire world's output of industrial goods, before the Industrial Revolution begins.
- Galley slavery is abolished in Europe.
- World population: 791,000,000
  - Africa: 106,000,000
  - Asia: 502,000,000
  - Europe: 163,000,000
  - Latin-America: 16,000,000
  - Northern America: 2,000,000
  - Oceania: 2,000,000

== Births ==
- January 24 – Nicolas Bergasse, French lawyer (d. 1832)
- January 24 – Helen Gloag, Scottish-born enslaved Empress of Morocco (d. 1790)
- March 16 – Caroline Herschel, German astronomer (d. 1848)
- April – Joanna Southcott, British religious fanatic (d. 1814)
- April 17 – François de Neufchâteau, French statesman, intellectual figure (d. 1828)
- May 2 – John André, British Army officer of the American Revolutionary War (d. 1780)
- May 20 – Stephen Girard, French-American banker, fourth richest American of all time (d. 1831)
- May 23 – Adamson Tannehill, American general and politician (d. 1820)
- May 28 – Diogo de Carvalho e Sampayo, Portuguese diplomat, scientist (d. 1807)
- May 31 – Karl August von Hardenberg, Prussian politician (d. 1822)
- June 6 – William Morgan, British statistician, actuary (d. 1833)
- July 5 – Aimé Argand, Swiss physicist, inventor (d. 1803)
- July 9 – Louise Marie Thérèse Bathilde d'Orléans, last princess of Condé (d.1822)
- July 25 – Henry Knox, military officer of the Continental Army and later the United States Army, 1st United States Secretary of War (d. 1806)

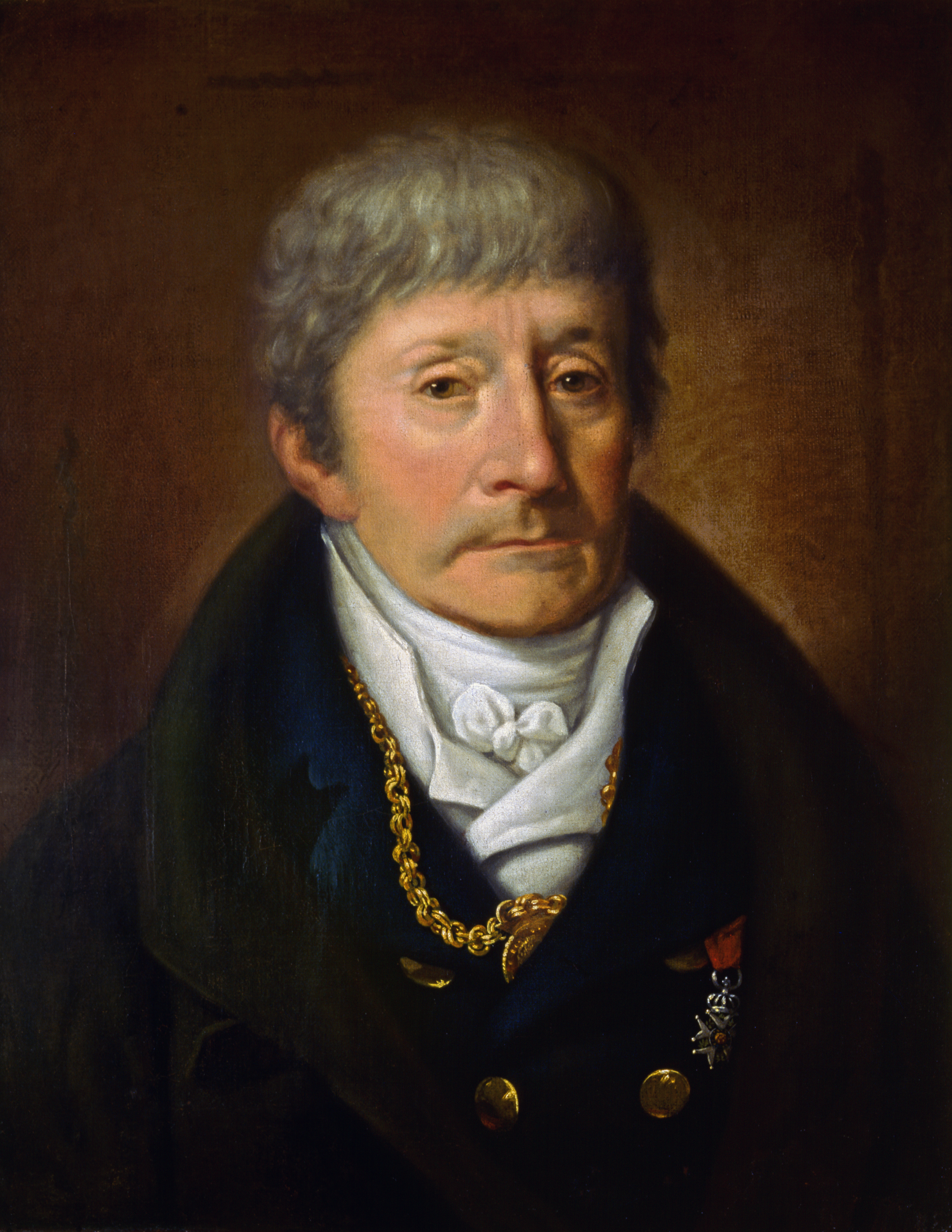
Antonio Salieri

- August 18 – Antonio Salieri, Italian composer (d. 1825)
- September 26 – Cuthbert Collingwood, 1st Baron Collingwood, British admiral (d. 1810)
- October 7 – Abraham Woodhull, Patriot spy during the American Revolutionary War (d. 1826)
- October 25 – Marie Le Masson Le Golft, French naturalist (b. 1826)
- October 31 – Leonor de Almeida Portugal, 4th Marquise of Alorna, Portuguese painter and poet (d. 1839)
- November 6 – Carlo Aurelio Widmann, Venetian nobleman and admiral (d. 1798)
- November 7 – Friedrich Leopold zu Stolberg-Stolberg, German poet (d. 1819)

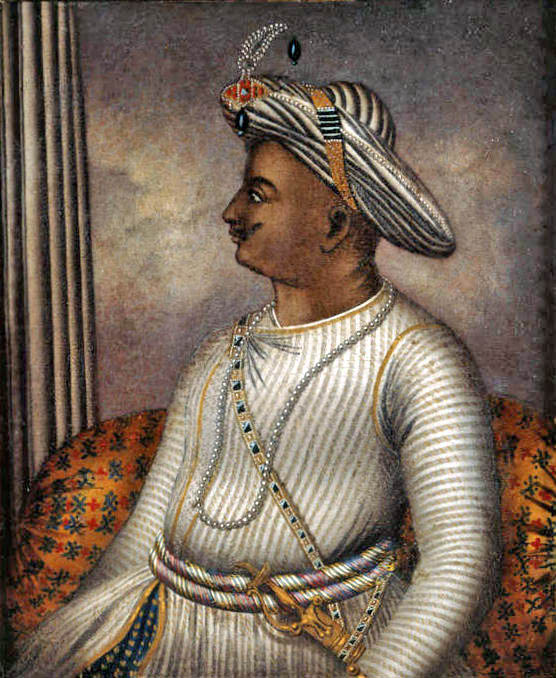
Tipu Sultan

- November 10 – Tipu Sultan, Sultan of Mysore (d. 1799)
- December 23 – Frederick Augustus I of Saxony (d. 1827)
- date unknown
  - Toypurina, Medicine woman of the Tongva nation and rebel leader (d. 1799)
  - Adwaita, Oldest tortoise (d. 2006) (alleged birth year; awaiting C-14 verification)
  - Urszula Zamoyska, Polish noblewoman and socialite (d. 1808)
  - Elizabeth Ryves, Irish writer and translator (d. 1797)
  - Moulvi Syed Qudratullah, Bengali judge (d. 1839)
  - Sengai Gibon, Japanese monk (d. 1837)

== Deaths ==
- January 16 – Ivan Trubetskoy, Russian field marshal (b. 1667)
- January 22 – Franz Xaver Josef von Unertl, Bavarian politician (b. 1675)
- January 23 – Ludovico Antonio Muratori, Italian historian and scholar (b. 1672)
- January 26 – Albert Schultens, Dutch philologist (b. 1686)
- January 29 – Sophia Schröder, Swedish soprano (b. 1712)
- February 7 – Algernon Seymour, 7th Duke of Somerset (b. 1684)
- February 8 – Aaron Hill, English writer (b. 1685)
- February 19 – Jan Frans van Bredael, Flemish painter (b. 1686)
- March 6 – Domenico Montagnana, Italian luthier (b. 1686)
- March 29 – James Jurin, British mathematician, doctor (b. 1684)
- April 7 – George Byng, 3rd Viscount Torrington, British Army general (b. 1701)
- May 3 – John Willison, Scottish minister, writer (b. 1680)
- May 17 – Georg Engelhard Schröder, Swedish artist (b. 1684)
- May 28 – Emperor Sakuramachi of Japan (b. 1720)
- June 15 – Marguerite de Launay, baronne de Staal, French author (b. 1684)
- July 15 – Vasily Tatishchev, Russian statesman, ethnographer (b. 1686)

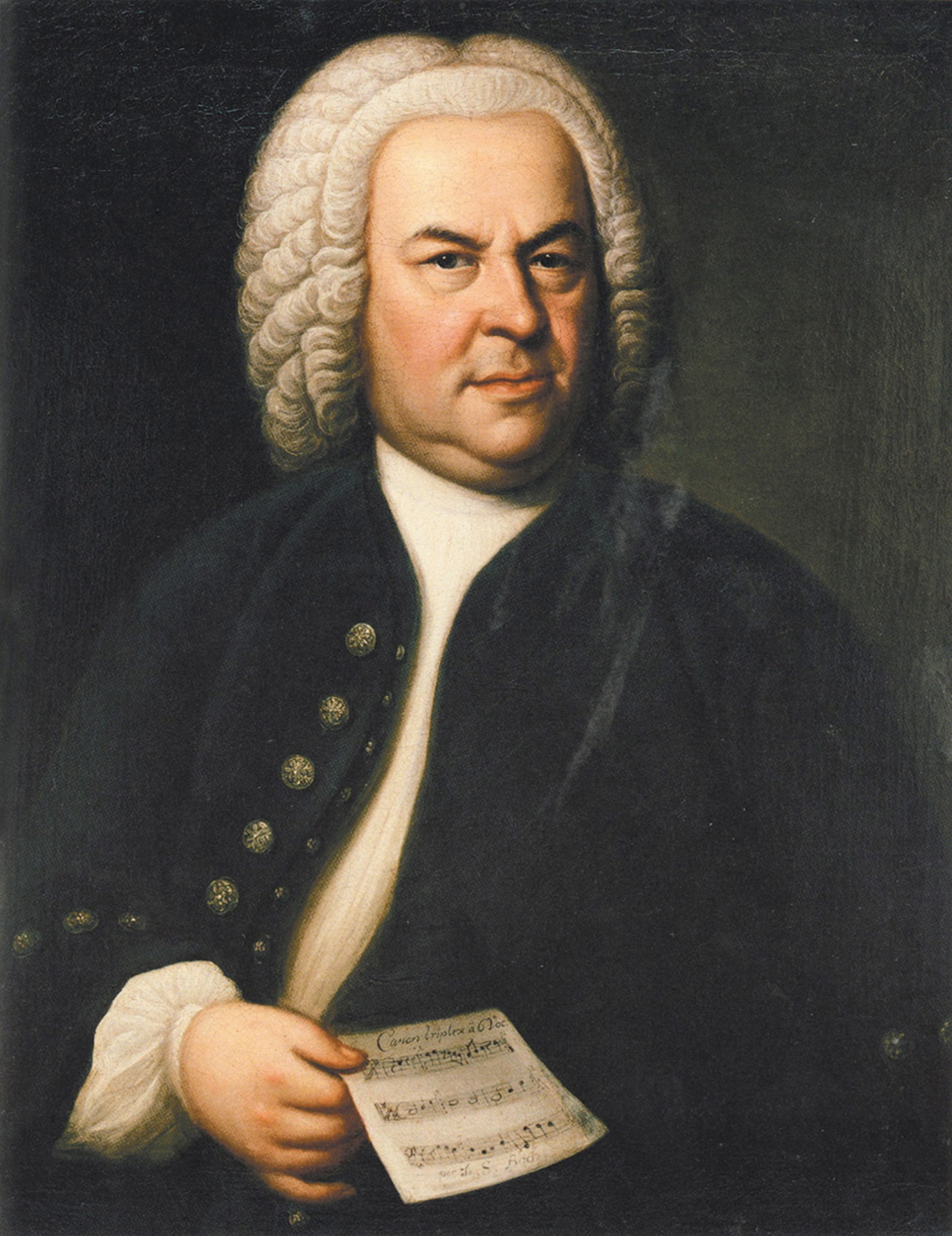
Johann Sebastian Bach

- July 28
  - Johann Sebastian Bach, German composer (b. 1685)
  - Conyers Middleton, English minister (b. 1683)
- July 31 – King John V of Portugal (b. 1689)
- August 8 – Charles Lennox, 2nd Duke of Richmond, English aristocrat, philanthropist and cricket patron (b. 1701)
- August 12 – Rachel Ruysch, Dutch painter (b. 1664)
- September 15 – Charles Theodore Pachelbel, German composer (b. 1690)
- October 3
  - Georg Matthias Monn, Austrian composer (b. 1717)
  - James MacLaine, Irish highwayman (b. 1724)
- October 16 – Sylvius Leopold Weiss, German composer, lutenist (b. 1687)
- November 1 – Gustaaf Willem van Imhoff, Dutch Governor-General of the Dutch East Indies (b. 1705)
- December 1 – Johann Gabriel Doppelmayr, German mathematician, astronomer, and cartographer (b. 1671)
- December 13 – Philemon Ewer, English shipbuilder (b. 1702)
- December 16
  - Nasir Jang Mir Ahmad, son of Turkic noble Nizam-ul-Mulk (b. 1712)
  - Nasir Jung, Head of Hyderabad State (b. 1712)
