= Price–specie flow mechanism =

Economic model of trade balance

The price–specie flow mechanism is a model developed by Scottish economist David Hume (1711–1776) to illustrate how trade imbalances can self-correct and adjust under the gold standard. Hume expounded his argument in Of the Balance of Trade, which he wrote to counter the Mercantilist idea that a nation should strive for a positive balance of trade (i.e., greater exports than imports). In short, the "increase in domestic prices due to the gold inflow would discourage exports and encourage imports, thus automatically limiting the amount by which exports would exceed imports".

Hume first elaborated on the mechanism in a 1749 letter to Montesquieu.

== Argument ==
Hume argued that when a country with a gold standard had a positive balance of trade, gold would flow into the country in the amount that the value of exports exceeds the value of imports. Conversely, when such a country had a negative balance of trade, gold would flow out of the country in the amount that the value of imports exceeds the value of exports. Consequently, in the absence of any offsetting actions by the central bank on the quantity of money in circulation (called sterilization), the money supply would rise in a country with a positive balance of trade and fall in a country with a negative balance of trade. Using a theory called the quantity theory of money, Hume argued that countries with an increasing money supply would see inflation as the prices of goods and services rose while countries with a decreasing money supply would experience deflation as the prices of goods and services fell.

The higher prices would, in the countries with a positive balance of trade, cause exports to decrease and imports to increase, which will alter the balance of trade downwards towards a neutral balance. Inversely, in countries with a negative balance of trade, the lower prices would cause exports to increase and imports to decrease, which will heighten the balance of trade towards a neutral balance. These adjustments in the balance of trade will continue until the balance of trade equals zero in all countries involved in the exchange.

The price–specie flow mechanism can also be applied to a state's entire balance of payments, which accounts not only for the value of net exports and similar transactions (i.e., the current account), but also the financial account, which accounts for flows of financial assets across countries, and the capital account, which accounts for non-market and other international transactions. But under a gold standard, transactions in the financial account would be conducted in gold—or currency convertible into gold—which would also affect the quantity of money in circulation.

== Contrary evidence ==
In practice, however, specie flows during the classical gold standard era failed to exhibit the self-corrective behavior described above. Gold finding its way back from surplus to deficit countries to exploit price differences was a painfully slow process, and central banks found it far more effective to raise or lower domestic price levels by lowering or raising domestic interest rates. High price level countries may raise interest rates to lower domestic demand and prices, but it may also trigger gold inflows from investors – contradicting the premise that gold will flow out of countries with high price levels. Developed economies deciding to buy or sell domestic assets to international investors also turned out to be more effective in influencing gold flows than the self-correcting mechanism predicted by Hume.
