= Peter Walkden =

English Presbyterian minister and diarist

Peter Walkden (16 October 1684 – 5 November 1769) was an English Presbyterian minister and diarist.

== Life ==
Walkden, born in Flixton, near Urmston, Lancashire, on 16 October 1684, was educated at a village school, then at the academy of James Coningham, minister of the Presbyterian chapel at Manchester, and finally at some Scottish university, where he graduated M.A.

He entered his first ministerial charge on 1 May 1709 at Garsdale, Yorkshire, which he quit at the end of 1711 to become minister of two small congregations at Newton-in-Bowland and Hesketh Lane, near Chipping, in a poor and sparsely inhabited agricultural part of Lancashire. There he remained until 1738, when he removed to Holcombe, near Bury in the same county.

In 1744 he was appointed to the pastorate of the tabernacle, Stockport, Cheshire, and remained there until his death on 5 November 1769. He was buried in his own chapel, and his son Henry wrote a Latin epitaph for his gravestone.

== Works ==
His diary for the years 1725, 1729, and 1730, the only portion which has survived, was published in 1866 by William Dobson of Preston. A new edition, along with his baptism register, was published by the Lancashire Family History & Heraldry Society in 1996. It presents a picture of the hard life of a poor country minister of the period, and suggested to Hall Caine some features of the character of Parson Christian in A Son of Hagar. Passages from his correspondence and commonplace books were also printed by James Bromley in the Transactions of the Historic Society of Lancashire and Cheshire (vols. xxxii. xxxvi. xxxvii.)

== Family ==
He was twice married: first, to Margaret Woodworth, who died in December 1715; his second wife's name is not known. He had eight children, of whom one, Henry, was a minister at Clitheroe, and died there on 2 April 1795.
