= Della Moneta =

First specific treatises on economics, especially monetary theory

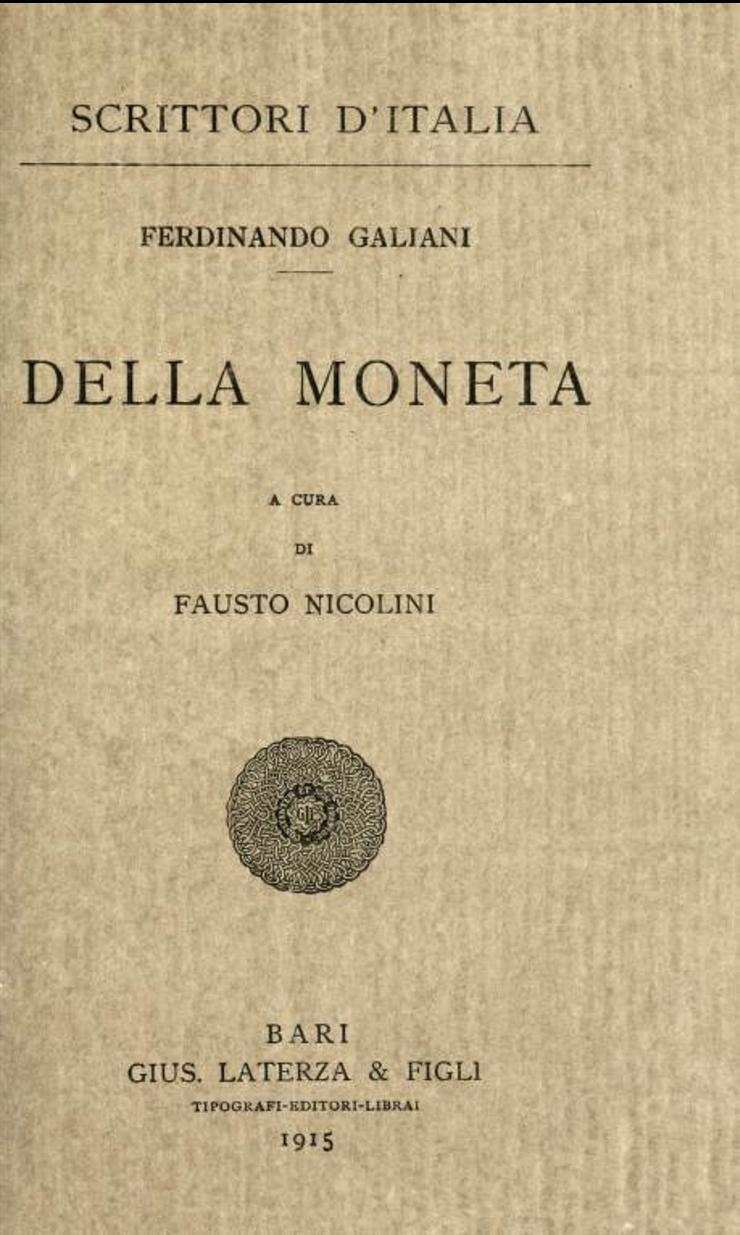
- Author: Ferdinando Galiani
- Language: Italian
- Genre: Economics, philosophy
- Publisher: Nella Stamperia Simoniana
- Publication date: 1751
- Publication place: Naples, Italy

Della Moneta (On Money) is a 1751 book written by Ferdinando Galiani, and is one of the first specific European treatises on economics, especially monetary theory, preceding Adam Smith's The Wealth of Nations by twenty-five years.

== Summary ==
Della Moneta is divided into five sections, covering what are still seen today as the standard aspects of monetary theory. These include the origin of money, its value (including inflation and deflation), interest, and monetary policy.

== The Origin of Money ==
The author started with the history of Italian coinage, going back to the Greeks and Romans. Discarding the contemporary view of the origin of money through centrally planned contracts, Galiani proposes that money tends to arise spontaneously, through the need for trade, anticipating the Austrian school of economics by well over a century. He describes a sort of thought experiment, in which a government would attempt to trade or confiscate through taxing a portion of all goods in the kingdom, until it finds that the plunder is too diverse and complex to manage, and would then turn to demanding only the trade equivalent in some simple commodities that happen to have the traits seen as useful for money at the time, like compactness, ease of distribution and ease of storage.

== The Value of Money ==
Interwoven into the other themes throughout the book is a second premise, that money, and material goods in general, have value based on their utility to people: a premise that was only rediscovered with examination of marginal utility 120 years later. He even touches upon a modern idea that would not be deeply examined again until the mid 20th century: that the value of money and goods may reach an equilibrium in price, based on supply and demand. This may also be the first modern examination of supply and demand as an economic driver.

== Methodology ==
In Della Moneta, Galiani attempts to use philosophical methodology in the presentation and organization of his book. He also criticizes other early economic texts as failing to do so. For example, he mentions Montesquieu, whose book he argues was harmful to France, because it commits the is-ought fallacy, contains wishful thinking, and lacks scientific rigour.

== Influences ==
Galiani appears to have been well-versed in the complex debates about how and why money had such an impact on Europe in the previous two centuries, brought on by incidents like the price revolution in Spain in the 16th century, where an influx of gold plundered from the New World caused dramatic inflation in first Spain, then all of Europe, a crisis that continued to varying degrees until around the time of Galiani's book.

He makes mention, in the book, of previous thoughts on topics of political economy by others, including John Locke and Ludovico Antonio Muratori.

== Impact ==
This book has been widely cited by economists from different schools of economic thought from Adam Smith's time on, from Karl Marx through Joseph Schumpeter.

== Translations ==
- On money : a translation of Della moneta (translated into English by Peter R Toscano), 1977, Ann Arbor, Michigan, University Microfilms International for University of Chicago
