= Ferdinando Galiani =

Italian economist (1728–1787)

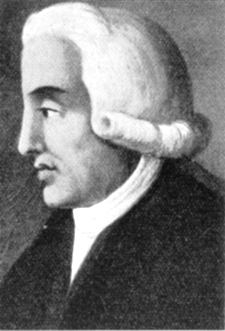
Galiani

Ferdinando Galiani (2 December 1728, Chieti, Kingdom of Naples – 30 October 1787, Naples, Kingdom of Naples), known in French contexts as Abbé Galiani, was an Italian economist, a leading Italian figure of the Enlightenment. Friedrich Nietzsche referred to him as "a most fastidious and refined intelligence" and "the most profound, discerning, and perhaps also the filthiest man of his century."

== Biography ==
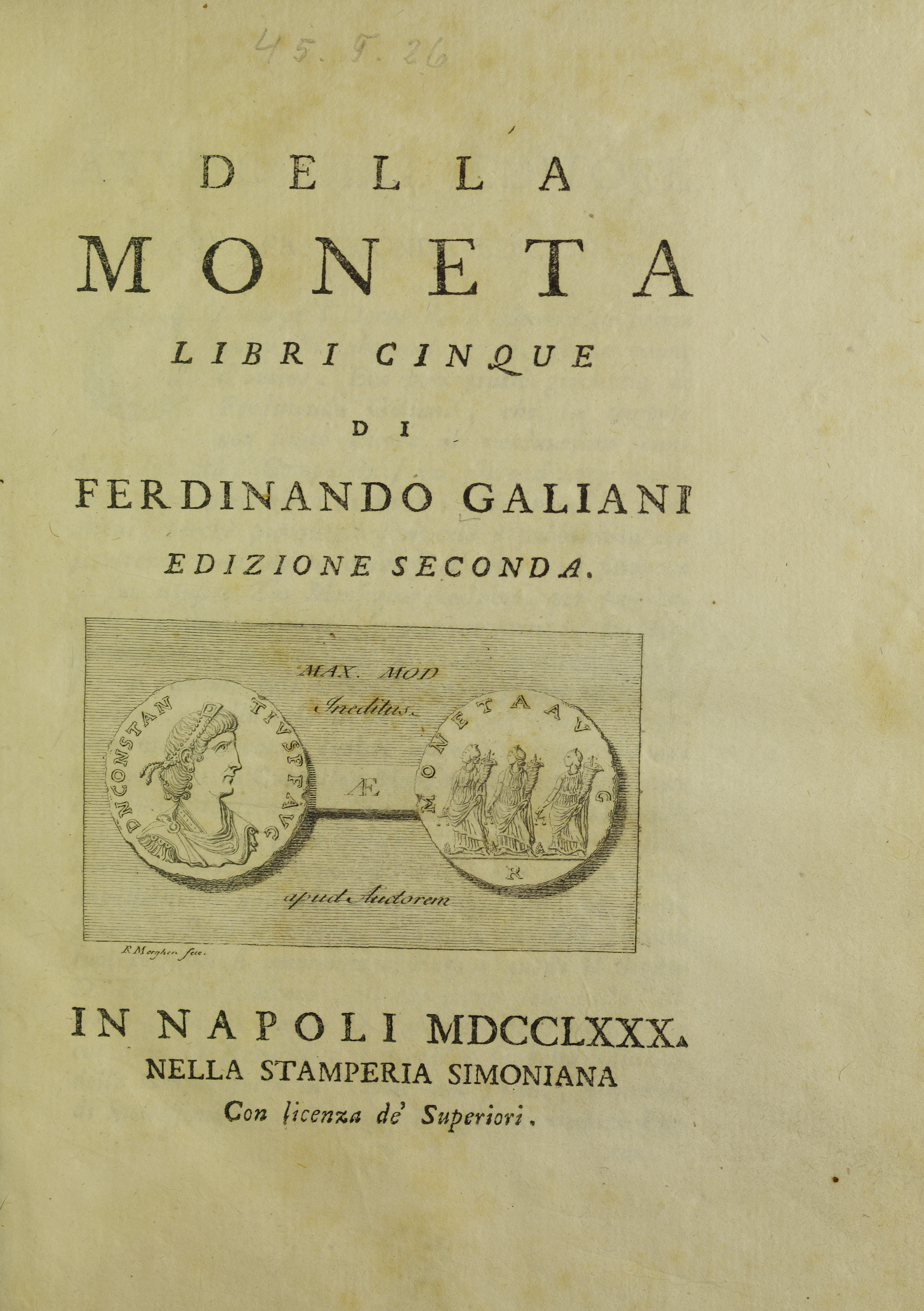
Della moneta, 1780

Born in Chieti, he was carefully educated by his uncle, Monsignor Celestino Galiani, in Naples and Rome with a view to entering the church. Galiani showed early promise as an economist, and even more as a wit. By the age of twenty-two, after he took orders, he had produced two works by which his name became widely known far beyond the bounds of Naples. The first, Della Moneta, a disquisition on coinage in which he shows himself a strong supporter of mercantilism, deals with many aspects of the question of exchange, but always with a special reference to the state of confusion then presented by the monetary system of the Neapolitan government.

The other, Raccolta in Morte del Boia, established his fame as a humorist, and was highly popular in Italian literary circles at the end of the 18th century. In this volume Galiani parodied, in a series of discourses on the death of the public hangman, the styles of Neapolitan writers of the day. Galiani's political knowledge and social qualities brought him to the attention of King Charles of Naples and Sicily (afterwards Charles III of Spain) and his liberal minister Bernardo Tanucci, and in 1759 Galiani was appointed secretary to the Neapolitan embassy in Paris. He held this post for ten years, when he returned to Naples and was made a councillor of the tribunal of commerce, and in 1777 administrator of the royal domains.

Galiani's published works focus on the area of humanities as well as social sciences. He left a large number of letters which are not only of biographical interest but are also important for the light they cast on the social, economic, and political characteristics of eighteenth-century Europe. His economic reputation was mainly due to his book written in French and published 1769 in Paris, namely, his Dialogues sur le commerce des bleds, "Dialogues on the commerce in wheat". This work, by its light and pleasing style, and its vivacious wit, delighted Voltaire, who described it as a cross between Plato and Molière. The author, says Giuseppe Pecchio, treated his arid subject as Fontenelle did the vortices of Descartes, or Algarotti the Newtonian system of the world. The question at issue was that of the freedom of the corn trade, then much agitated, and, in particular, the policy of the royal edict of 1764, which permitted the exportation of grain so long as the price had not reached a certain level. The general principle he maintains is that the best system in regard to this trade is to have no system — countries in different circumstances requiring, according to him, different modes of treatment. Similarly to Voltaire and even Pietro Verri, he held that one country cannot gain without another losing, and in his earlier treatise defended the action of governments in debasing the currency. Until his death in Naples, Galiani kept up a correspondence with his old Parisian friends, notably Louise d'Épinay; this was published in 1818.

See L'abate Galiani, by Alberto Marghieri (1878), and his correspondence with Tanucci in Giovan Pietro Vieusseux's L'Archivio storico (Florence, 1878).

== Published works ==
=== Della moneta ===
In 1751, while still a student, Galiani wrote a book entitled Della moneta which intervened in the Neapolitan debate on economic reform. In this book, he discussed financial politics and gave opinions on how to develop the Neapolitan economy. At the same time, he proposed a theory of value based on utility and scarcity; this depth of thinking on economic value would not be seen again until discussions of marginal utility developed in the 1870s. In addition, Galiani's tract exhibited conventional Mercantilist ideas and some of his recommendations were adopted by the Neapolitan government.

Chapter 1 of Book I introduces the history of money as well as the rise and fall of states in antiquity and modern times. By using historical examples, Galiani illustrated his idea that commerce was neglected by political rulers throughout the whole history of humankind. States could become rich and grew through the conquest; however, they could not enhance their power, territory and wealth without commerce.

In the core chapter of the book, Galiani explained that the value of money at any point in time derived from principles that were part of human nature itself; money was definitely not a human invention by which people deliberately changed the societies they lived in. Money generated naturally from the gradual modification of people's loves into social ideas of value that inspired commercial interaction. Money exists without relying on promises, trust, or another moral capacity of self-restraint and money is not created by an agreement. If this situation was changed, commerce could not be the centre of modern societies.

In Della moneta, Galiani constantly described the effects of human actions in terms of providential rewards and punishments. He used the term "providence" to reconcile the historical dynamic of commercial progress with a set of fixed moral rules that lay at the core of successful human interaction. Galiani presented any moralistic dismissals of natural price formation and self-interested profit-seeking as reproaches to the way God intended human societies to function. Providential mechanisms were also involved in the history of money, the rise and fall of states in both antiquity and modernity and regulated the development of cultural characteristics of the dominant societies in the course of time. Throughout history man constantly reshaped the fictional moral beliefs, thereby creating the mental preconditions for commercial society.

=== Dialogues sur le commerce des bleds ===
During the period of being a diplomat in Paris, Galiani wrote Dialogues sur le commerce des bleds, which emphasized the importance for the regulation of commerce — an argument that opposed the physiocrats, who advocated complete freedom. This book was published in 1770 and Galiani indicated in this book that there are increasing returns to manufacturing, and diminishing returns to agriculture and the wealth of a nation depends on manufacturing and trade. Although approving of the edict of 1764 liberalizing the grain trade, Galiani rejected much of the physiocratic analysis, notably its "land theory of value". His 1770 piece also provided a quite modern analysis of the balance of payments.

In the Dialogues, Galiani described that wheat can be seen in two different aspects. The distinctions between two different aspects are important: as a product of the earth, wheat can be considered both commerce and economic legislation. As a product of first necessity, wheat is a symbol of social order and belongs to administration. As Galiani put it in an illuminating way, ‘As soon as supplying [wheat] is the concern of administration, it is no longer an object of commerce’. Correspondingly, ‘It is certain that what is sensible and useful from one standpoint, becomes absurd and harmful from another’.

Galiani believed that there are many shocks to the economy, which can cause disequilibrium and it takes long time for the restoration of equilibrium. He thought that something instead of the natural law needed to face the challenge and shocks. Administration dealt with the ‘sudden movements’ of the economy, such as shortages in the wheat supply. In other words, the legislator could not but consider the down-to-earth constraints of subsistence. In this respect, the physiocratic enlightened despot consistently and independently ruling economic matters according to natural laws was not enough to maintain social order.

== Attitude to physiocrats ==
Galiani not only had theoretical brilliance with his idea of "natural" laws in economics, but also was a practical man, skeptical about the reach of abstract theory, particularly when action was necessary and urgent. He was repelled by the wide-eyed policies called for by the physiocrats, which he believed were unrealistic, impractical and, in times of crisis, downright dangerous.

Galiani disagreed with the physiocratic argument which said that in order to provide a sufficient supply of grain, it suffices to establish a completely free trade. In fact, the foreign trade agreed with the physiocrats that internal free trade can benefit the economy. However, Galiani used the case of exportation to challenge the physiocrats. At one point in the Dialogues, he even stated: ‘Here I am not talking about the internal liberty of trade… Let us talk foreign trade’ (Galiani 1770, 224-5). Whereas the physiocrats advocated total liberty both domestically and internationally, Galiani believed internal liberty was the first priority. Even though he was not totally opposed to grain exportation, Galiani often condemned the physiocratic liberty to export grain. Precisely, he argued that the foreign trade can threaten domestic liberty, for the frontier provinces of the kingdom may find foreign markets more attractive than domestic ones. Therefore, as long as there is no certainty as to the existence of a permanent surplus, Galiani claimed, the nation must concentrate its efforts on the internal circulation of grain.

For him, the physiocrats were a dangerous group of impractical men with wrong ideas. In 1768, as France collapsed in a near-famine, the physiocrats still called for "non-action", muttering on their ordre naturel and the glorious wisdom of Quesnay, which galvanized of making their own remarkable contributions in opposition.

== Works ==
- Della moneta, 1750
- Dialogues sur le commerce des bleds, 1770
- Doveri dei prìncipi neutrali, 1782
