= 太原 =

太原 may refer to:

- Taigen Sessai (died 1557), Japanese abbot
- Taiyuan in Shanxi Province, China
- Taewon, the Korean transliteration
  - Taewon Bang clan, Korean clans
  - Taewon Yi clan, Korean clans
- Thái Nguyên, the Vietnamese transliteration
  - Thái Nguyên in Vietnam
  - Thái Nguyên province in the Northeast region of Vietnam

== See also ==
- The dictionary definition of 太 at Wiktionary
- The dictionary definition of 原 at Wiktionary
