= Germain Brice =

French writer (1653-1727)

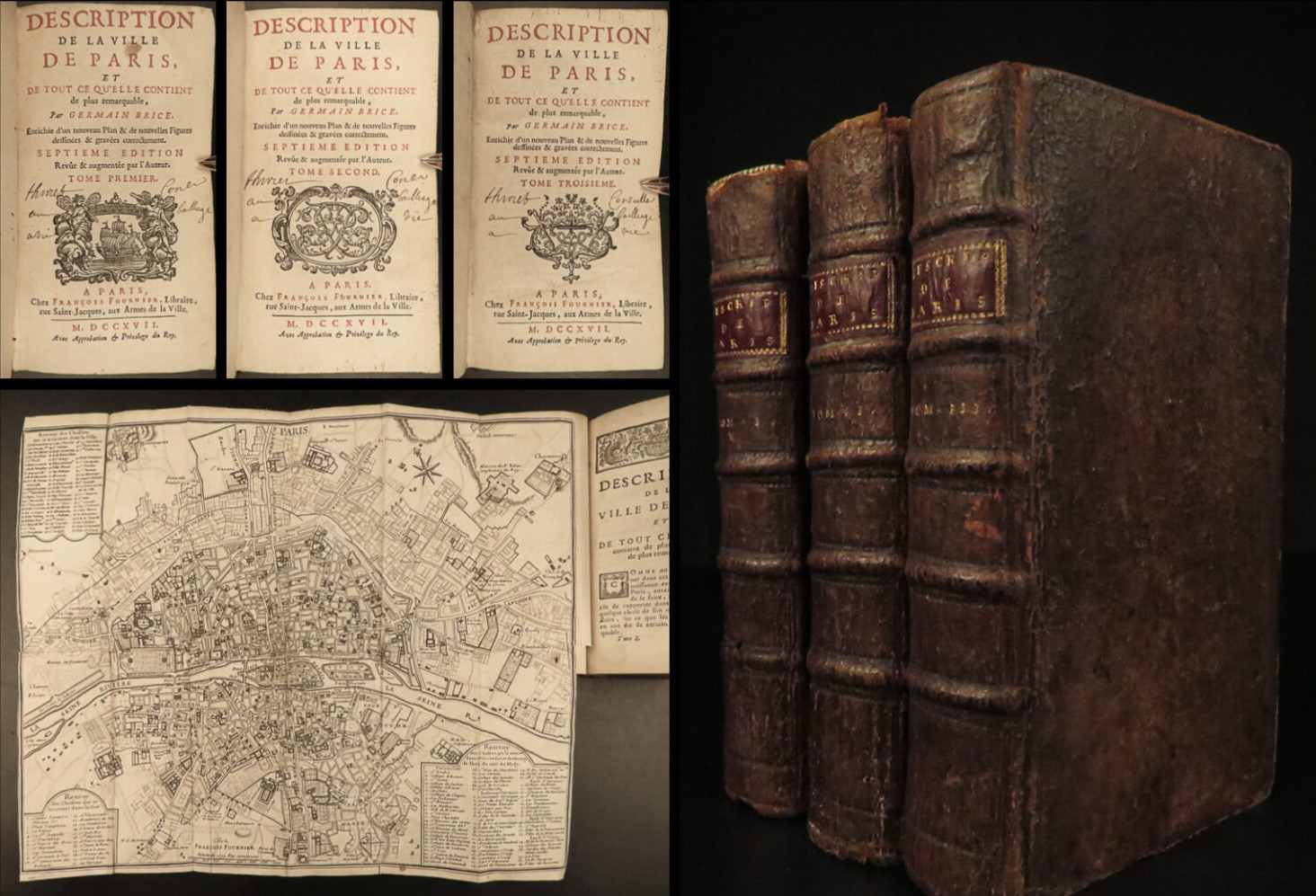
Germain Brice: Description de la ville de Paris et de tout ce qu'elle contient de plus remarquable, the three volumes of the seventh edition, published in 1717.

Germain Brice (1653–1727) was a French writer, best known for his book Description de la ville de Paris et de tout ce qu'elle contient de plus remarquable (Description of the city of Paris and all the most remarkable things that it contains). The work, which was published in several editions and continually expanded, was first published in 1684. In some of the later editions the addition Nouvelle was used in the title. This book was the most popular travel guide on the city of Paris in the 17th and 18th century.

== Biography ==
Little is known about Germain Brice's life. There are few sources and the information is sparse. What is known about him comes mostly from the Avertissement (preface pages) of his own publications.

=== Man of the Church ===
Germain Brice was born in Paris into modest circumstances. Nevertheless, his parents were able to provide him with a sound education, which also included studying. It can be assumed that he studied theology, as contemporary sources say that he wore the ecclesiastical habit throughout his life. However, it is also said that he never joined a religious order.

=== Teacher, travel guide and author ===
Brice had a fondness for the French language as well as for the fine arts. The cosmopolitan Brice soon came into contact with foreign visitors to Paris, to whom he not only taught the French language, but also introduced them to the city's architectural and artistic sights through walks. This is how, in addition to his job as a language teacher, he also became a tour guide. Through self-study, he acquired in-depth knowledge of his hometown and the artists, architects, writers and public figures who made up the greatness of the city of Paris. However, in order to further deepen his general knowledge of art history, he also went on a study trip to Italy.

== Brice's travel guide – and the others ==
In 1684, Brice put the knowledge he had acquired into practice and published his first travel guide on his hometown: Description de la ville de Paris et de tout ce qu'elle contient de plus remarquable. The book immediately became a bestseller and is considered one of the first travel guides ever. Part of the success was certainly the beautiful copperplate engravings that Brice incorporated into his travel guide from the fifth edition (1706) to illustrate the text. For this Brice hired the best engravers and draftsmen of his time such as: Jean Chaufourier, Antoine Hérisset (1685–1769), Ferdinand Delamonce (1678–1753), Claude Lucas (1685–1765), Antoine Aveline, Gérard Jean-Baptiste Scotin (1671–1716) and his son Gérard Jean-Baptiste Scotin le jeune (1698–1755). These engravings were often later removed from the books to be hung on the wall as framed pictures. The last edition of 1752 includes forty-one engravings, including the folding plan of Paris.

=== Thiéry, du Breul and Le Maire ===
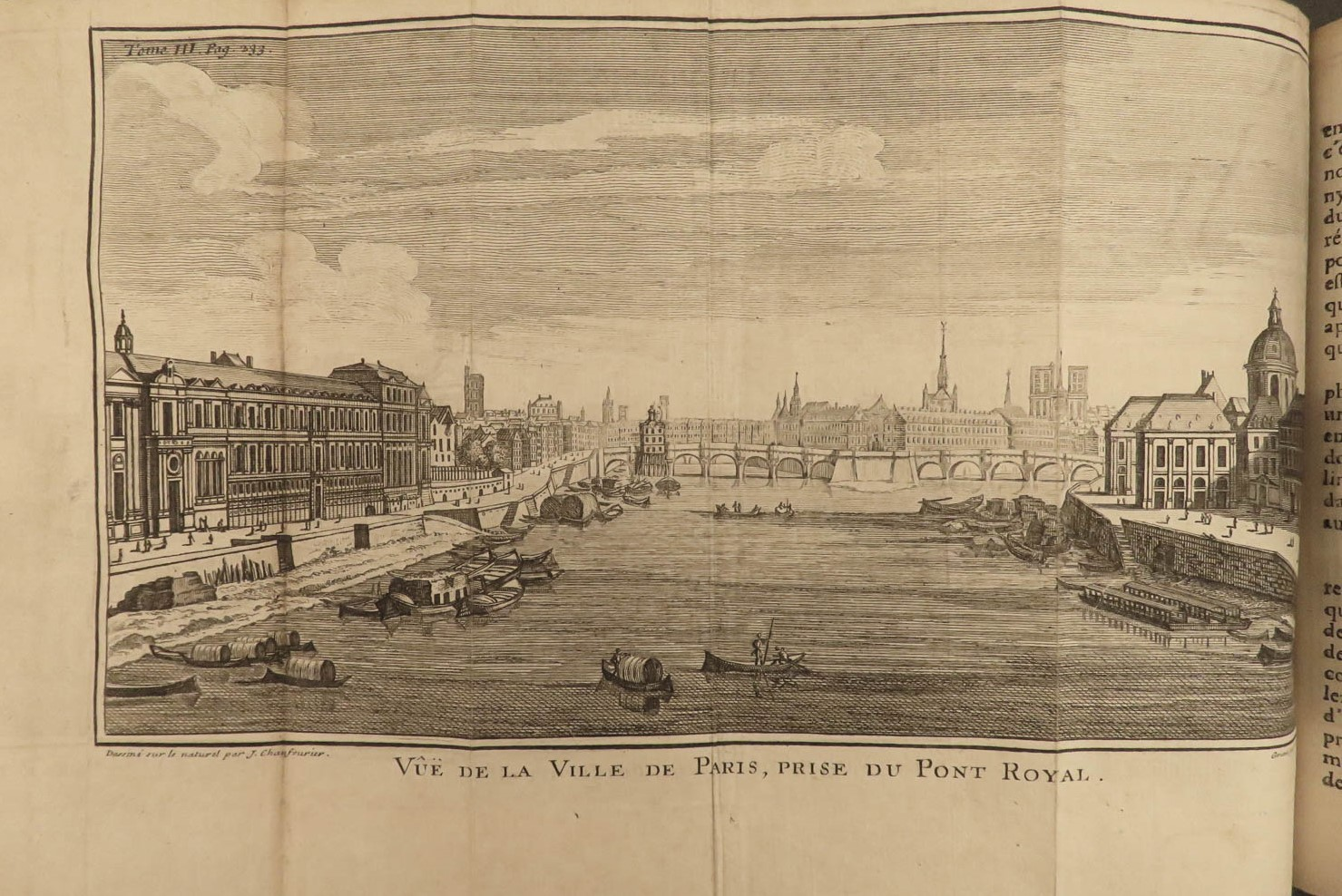
View of Paris from the Pont Royal with the Seine and the Cathédrale Notre-Dame de Paris in the distance in Germain Brice's travel guide, seventh edition, published in 1717.

However, even before Brice published his travel guide, Jacques du Breul (1528–1614), a French Benedictine monk from the Abbaye de Saint-Germain-des-Prés, had already published a book in the same sense, titled Théâtre des antiquités de Paris, où est traité de la fondation des églises et chapelles de la cité, Université, ville et diocèse de Paris, comme aussi de l'institution du Parlement, fondation de l'Université et collèges, et autres choses remarquables in 1612. And also after Brice's first publication, it was Charles Le Maire with his book Paris ancient et nouveau – Ouvrage très curieux ou l'on voit la fondation, les accroissemens, le nombre des habitants, & des Maisons de cette grand Ville, published in 1685, who wrote a book in a similar style.

Another author who wrote about Paris and its prestigious buildings was Luc-Vincent Thiéry. He was the author of the Guide des amateurs et des étrangers voyageurs à Paris, ou Description raisonnée de cette Ville, de sa Banlieue, et de tout ce qu'elles contiennent de remarquable, published in 1787. However, in addition to the sights, Thiéry focused on the hôtels particuliers with a particular focus on their interiors and collections. Thiéry's described tours in these private houses amount to guided tours. His reports are like an inventory. He meticulously describes where which picture hangs or which piece of furniture is in which room, who made it or what its provenance is, as he did when he visited the Hôtel Chanac de Pompadour in the time of Pierre Victor, Baron de Besenval de Brunstatt. In comparison to Brice, Thiéry does not mention the external architectural features of the Baron de Besenval's residence at all. His focus is exclusively on the baron's valuable furniture as well as his porcelain and art collection.

=== The splendour of Paris ===
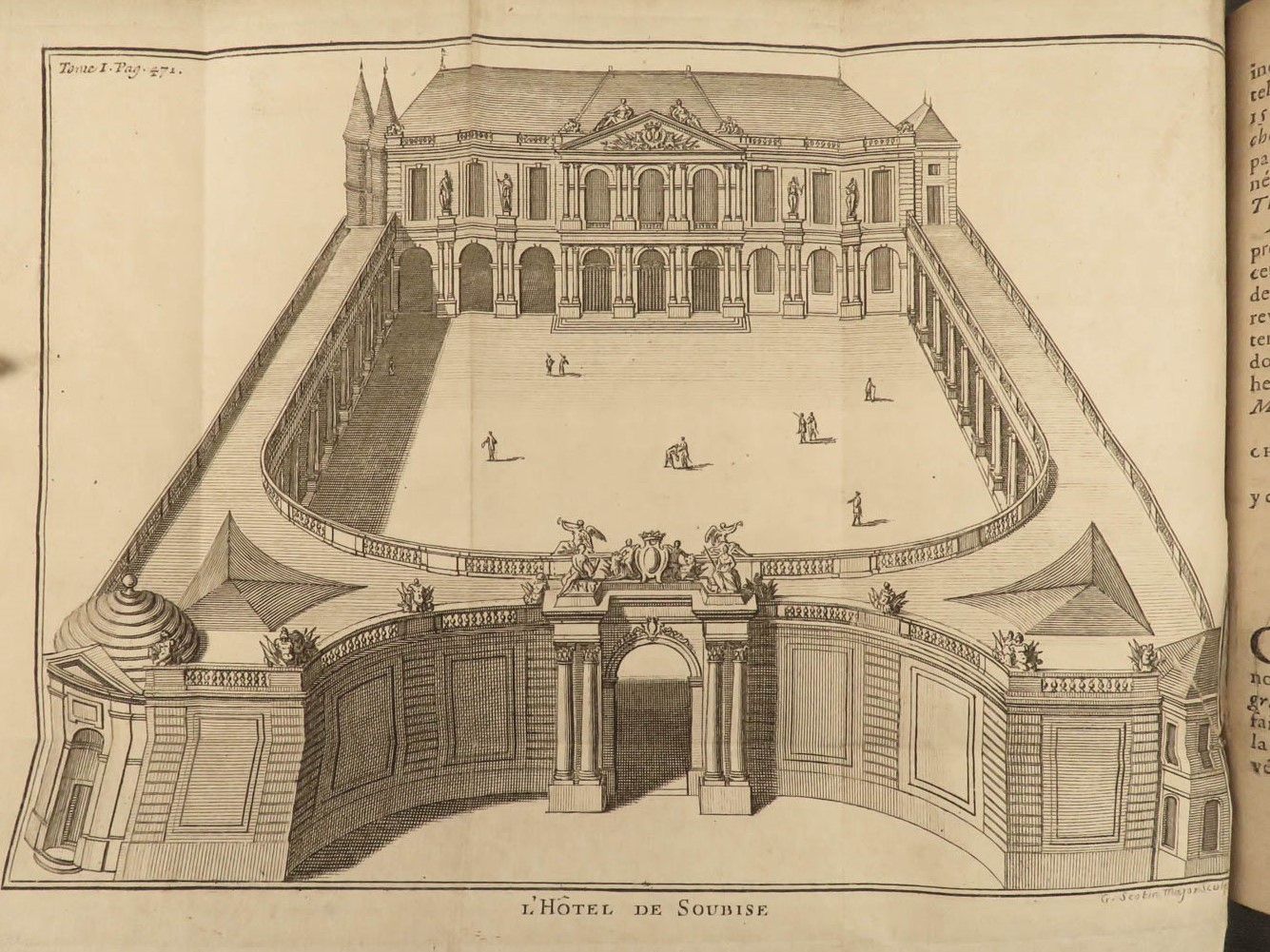
The Hôtel de Soubise in Germain Brice's travel guide, seventh edition, published in 1717. The new entrance portal for the Hôtel Chanac de Pompadour was designed by the architects Moreillon & Taillens in 1939, based on the design of the entrance portal of the Hôtel de Soubise.

By comparing the three similar publications by Germain Brice, Jacques du Breul and Charles Le Maire, the writer Michel Félibien, author of the five-volume Histoire de la Ville de Paris, points out: "Germain Brice is more brilliant and active than the other two." And Félibien goes on: "Germain Brice brings new splendour to the capital of the kingdom every day with his often reprinted descriptions."

Brice was constantly wandering around the city, visiting the most iconic locations, but also observing construction sites and talking to architects and building contractors. This meant he was always up to date on what was happening in the city. That's how he learned about the construction work on the Hôtel de Soubise and the Hôtel Chanac de Pompadour, which were both remodelled and newly built respectively by the celebrated architect Pierre-Alexis Delamair in 1704. Brice included both of these remarkable and still existing hôtels particuliers in the seventh edition of his travel guide, published in 1717.

From the very beginning, Brice knew how to include in his publication those sights and inside stories that aroused great interest among his readers. This also explains the great success of the publication, which was published in nine editions over a period of over 100 years.

The travel guide featured amongst others: Royal palaces, churches, places, public buildings and hôtels particuliers such as: The Louvre, the Palais des Tuileries, the Palais-Royal, the Palais du Luxembourg, the Cathédrale Notre-Dame de Paris, the Église Saint-Gervais-Saint-Protais de Paris, the Place Royale, the Place de Louis le Grand, the Sorbonne-Université, the Hôtel de ville de Paris, the Hôtel Royale des Invalides, the Hôtel de Soubise, the Hôtel de Nevers and the Hôtel Chanac de Pompadour.

=== The final edition ===
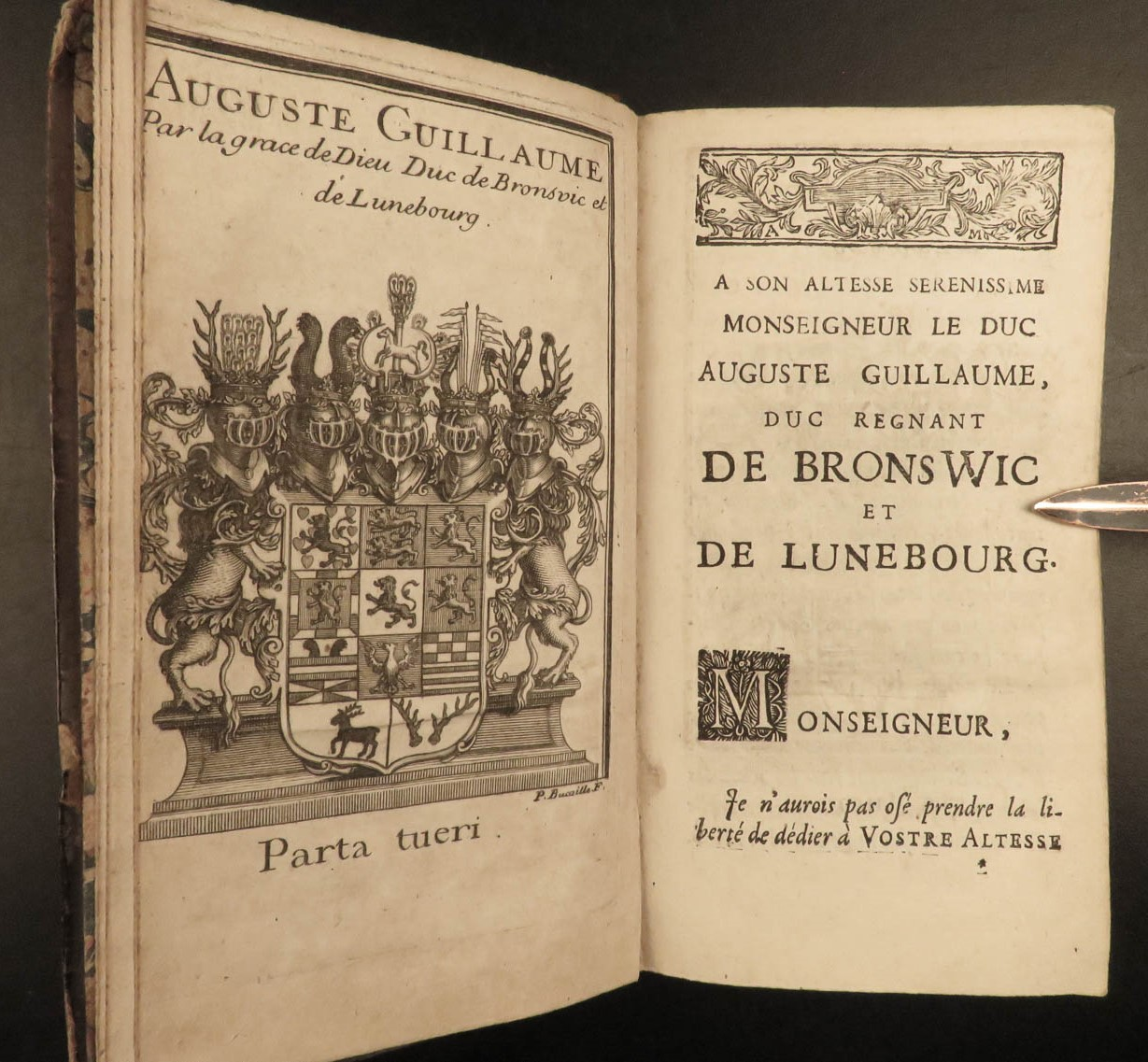
The page after the frontispiece of the seventh edition of Germain Brice's travel guide, published in 1717. This is a special print of this edition. It is dedicated to August Wilhelm, Herzog von Braunschweig-Wolfenbüttel and shows the coat of arms of the ducal house of the Herzogtum Braunschweig-Lüneburg.

It was not difficult for Germain Brice to find a publisher for his publication. The travel guide sold extremely well and the publishers also made good money from it. While the first edition consisted of 565 pages, the number rose to over 2000 pages in the final edition (1752).

The final edition moved away from the original intention of being a travel guide to Paris and became a guide for art lovers, detailing the artistic wealth of Paris. It was the age of the Grand Tour and in particular the British Jeunesse dorée, the children of the aristocracy and the landed gentry, were stocking up on art knowledge in continental Europe, but also on works of art for their town mansions and country houses. Brice's travel guide provided the background information.

=== Year of publication and publisher of Brice's travel guide ===
- 1684: Nicolas Le Gras
- 1687: Nicolas Le Gras or Jean Pohier
- 1698: Nicolas Le Gras, Nicolas Le Clerc, Barthelemy Girin
- 1701: Nicolas Le Gras, Nicolas Le Clerc, Barthelemy Girin
- 1706: Nicolas Le Gras, Michel & Augustin Brunet
- 1713: François Fournier
- 1717: François Fournier
- 1725: François Fournier, Julien-Marie Gandouin
- 1752: Jean-Thomas Hérissant, P.-G. Le Mercier Desaint & Saillant, Durand, Le Prieur

== Gallery of engravings in Germain Brice's travel guide, seventh edition, published in 1717 ==
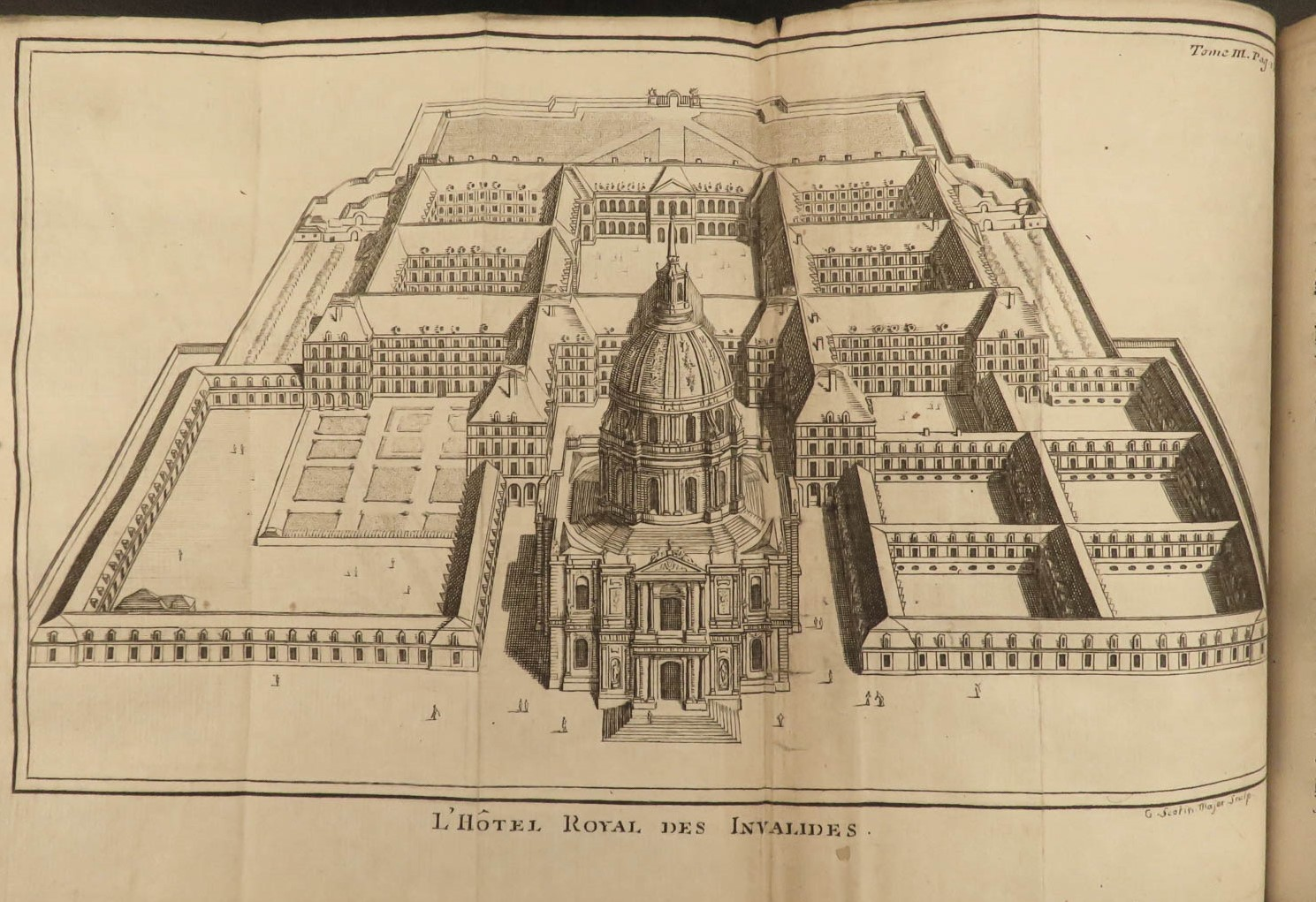
The Hôtel Royale des Invalides in Paris.

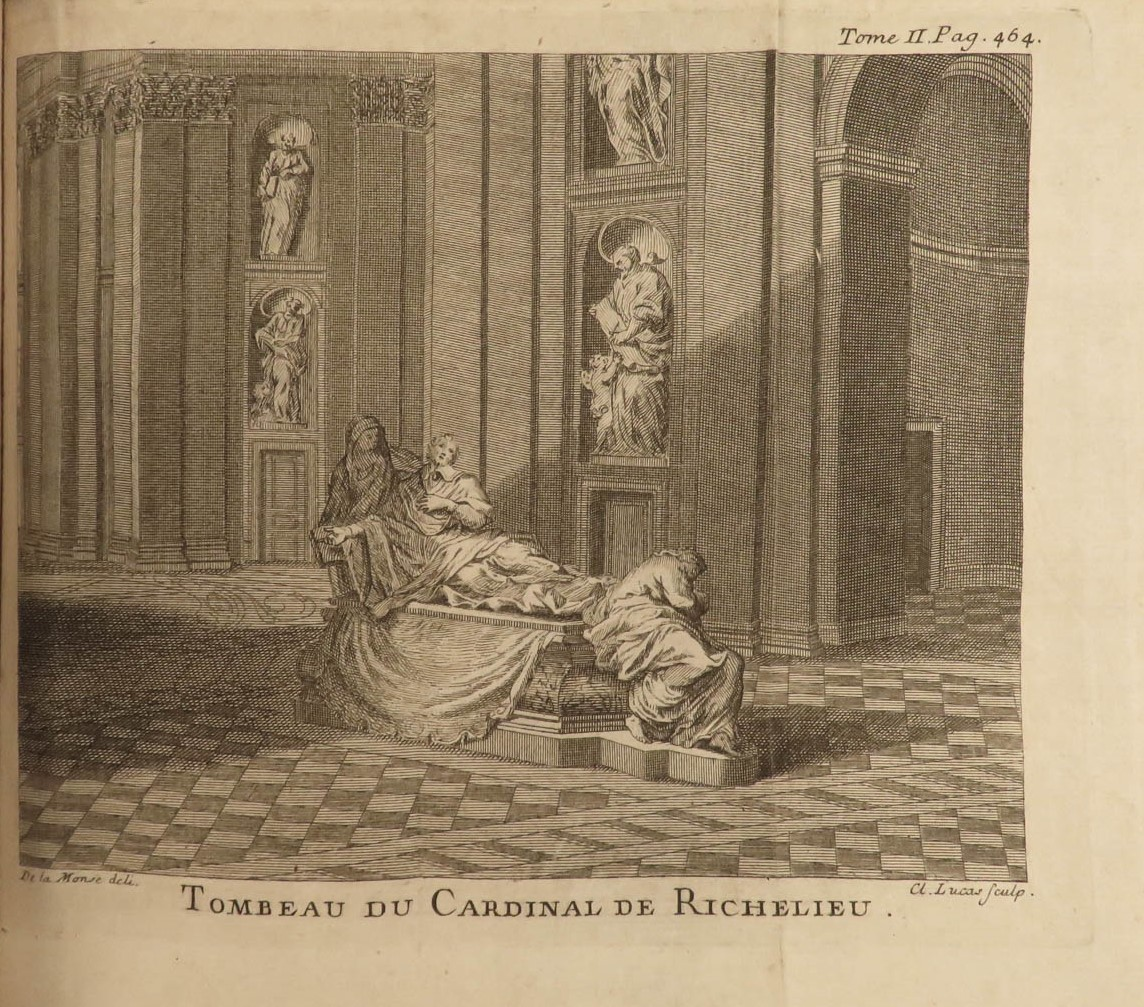
The tomb of Cardinal de Richelieu in the Sorbonne Chapel in Paris.

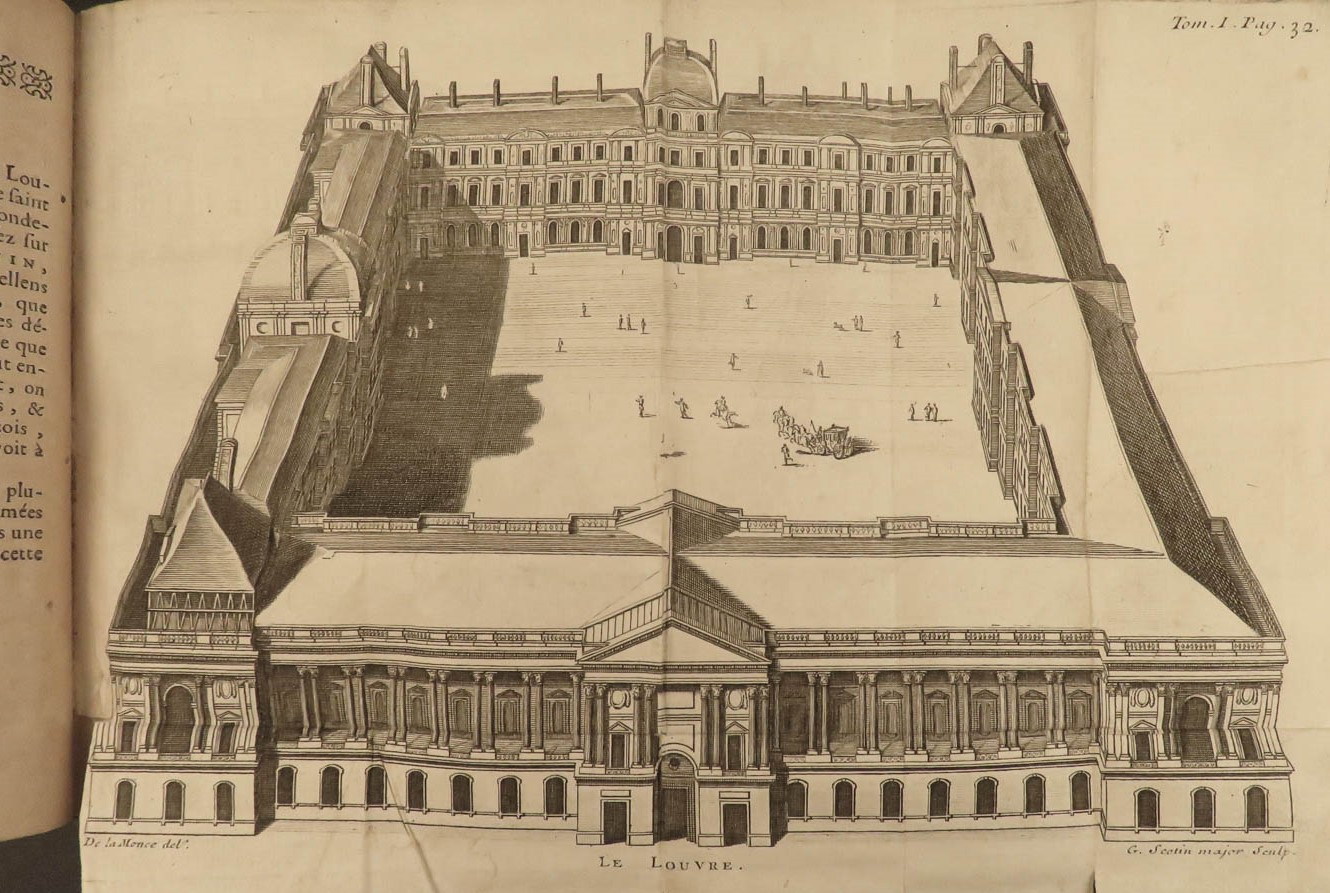
The Louvre in Paris.

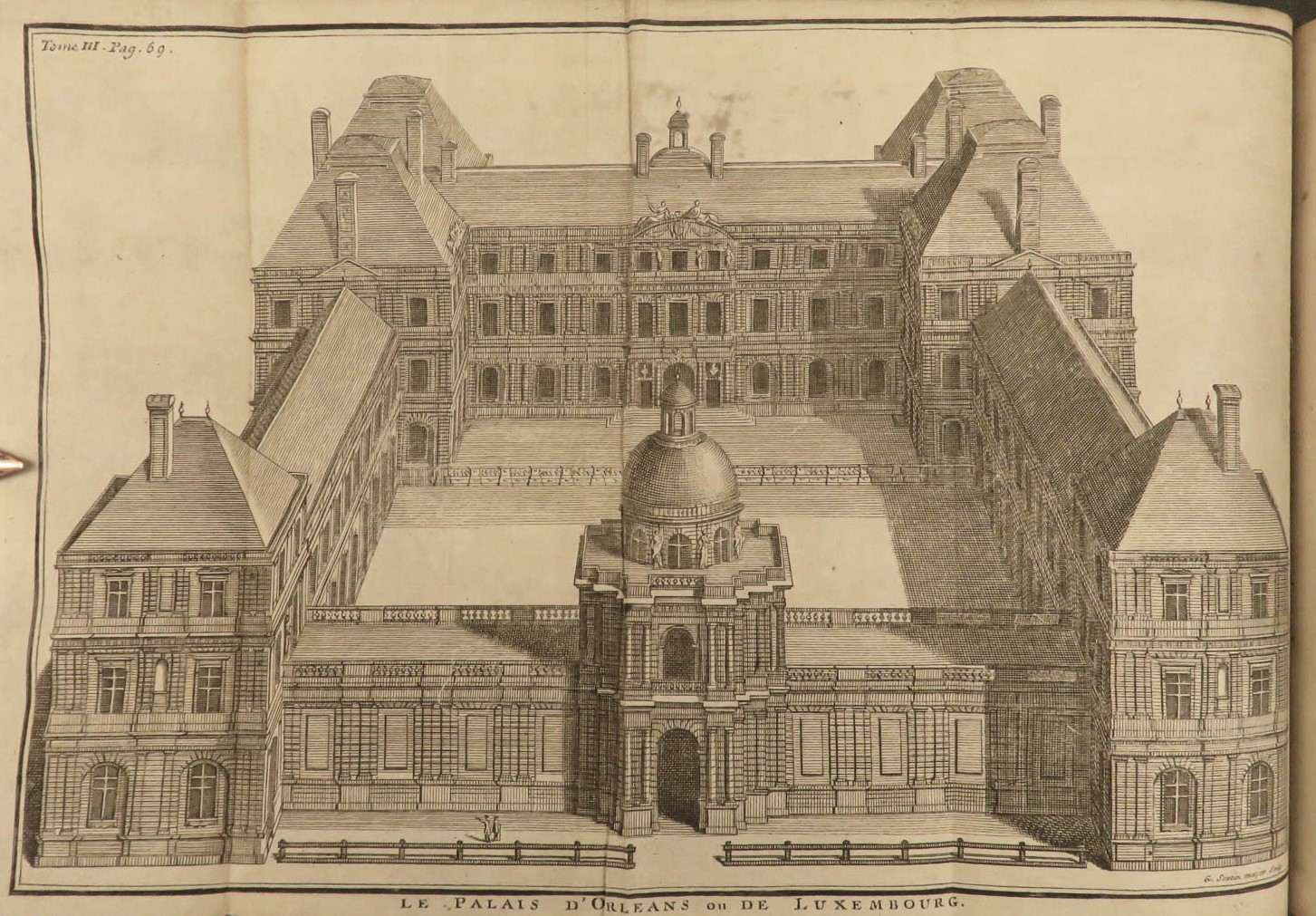
The Palais du Luxembourg in Paris.
