= Myriem Foncin =

French geographer and librarian (1893–1976)

- Born: Marie Joséphine Lucie Foncin; 2 May 1893; Paris, France
- Died: 5 January 1976 (aged 82); Toulon, France
- Education: University of Paris
- Occupations: Geographer, librarian
- Spouse: none
- Father: Pierre François Charles Foncin (1841–1916)

Myriem Foncin (2 May 1893 – 5 January 1976) was a French geographer and librarian, primarily in the cartographic sections of the French national library (BnF) where she held positions of increasing responsibility for 44 years.

== Biography ==
Foncin was born as Marie Joséphine Lucie Foncin to the prominent geographer Pierre François Charles Foncin (1841–1916) and his second wife, Jeanne Marie de Pozzi.

Myriem Foncin idealized her father and vowed to follow his career choices. She graduated in history and geography from the Sorbonne during the First World War and was a pioneer of women's involvement in French academic geography. She was the first woman to publish in the journal Annales de Géographie. She was subsequently honorary chief curator of the Department of Maps and Plans at the Bibliothèque Nationale de France (BnF) in Paris. She spent her entire career at that library, including 26 years as head of the Department of Maps and Plans.

=== First female manager ===
Foncin joined the Maps and Plans section of the BnF Printed Materials Department in June 1920 as a trainee librarian, hired on the "warm recommendation" of her father's friend and eminent historian of cartography, Lucien Gallois. She quickly made her mark by revitalizing the modern collections despite her colleague Charles Du Bus, who was more interested in art history and ancient cartography. From 1926 to 1938, there was a long period of vacancy for the position of head of the Maps and Plans section. After the departure of Albert Isnard, the administrators and successive directors could not bring themselves to appoint Charles Du Bus, who was an eccentric and even dandy librarian, or Myriem Foncin, a young associate and holder of the technical diploma of librarian, but above all a woman, nor could they create a third executive position. Eventually, Foncin became the obvious choice and was named interim manager.

Finally, in 1939, through her work and having reached an age considered respectable, she was given the position of section chief. In 1942, she was appointed director of the Department of Maps and Plans and remained in charge until 16 March 1963. She set up a network of libraries and archives and was responsible for managing the department. She went on to establish a network of female librarians in institutions with a geographic or cartographic dimension.

Tracing of a map of the surroundings of Thái Nguyên, Vietnam, by Myriem Foncin. (BnF collection)

From 1946 to 1954, she worked with the chief architect Michel Roux-Spitz on a project to renovate and expand the space in the Hôtel Tubeuf that was dedicated to cartographic collections. She collaborated with architects to design layouts adapted to the Department of Maps and Plans, and these innovations were closely followed by French and foreign professionals. In June 1954, the Department of Maps and Plans reopened in its new location in the Richelieu complex, after its collections had been divided between the Institut de Géographie and the Salle Mortreuil of the BnF since 1938.

=== Woman of learning ===
She devoted her first works to Provence and started a thesis on the development of the Parisian agglomeration during the last centuries, under the direction of the geographer Albert Demangeon, a thesis that she did not complete. A geographer, bibliographer, librarian, and historian of cartography, from the 1930s onwards she directed her writings towards the publication of bibliographies, then toward the publication of rules for cataloguing and conserving cartographic documents (1951), and finally toward short articles on heritage acquisitions. With Marcel Destombes and Monique de La Roncière, she wrote the Catalogue of Nautical Charts on vellum preserved in the Department of Maps and Plans (1963).

Her knowledge of biblio-economic matters enabled her to hold important positions within the International Geographical Union; knowledge acquired through the drafting and publication of new rules for cataloguing cartographic collections accepted according to international standards.

=== Activist ===
At the same time, she was an activist for popular education and reading. In 1923 she founded the women's branch of the "Social Teams" founded in 1920 by Robert Garric, where she led reading and study circles. From 1938 onwards, she was active in the Association of French Librarians, where she organized basic training for those in charge of leisure libraries. In 1940 and 1941, she led training courses for those in charge of libraries created for refugees and in youth centers. In 1938, Foncin formed an informal group of popular educators, publishers and professional librarians, who worked together on criteria for the selection of books for mass libraries. Involved with scientists and users of the BnF, but also with library professionals, she nevertheless kept time for public reading throughout her career.

She retired in 1964 and died in Toulon in 1976.

=== Memberships ===
- First woman president of the Association of French Librarians twice, from 1945 to 1947 and from 1958 to 1961.
- Member emeritus of the Committee of Historical and Scientific Works, Geographic Sciences and Environment, of which she was made the secretary of the geography section in 1956.

=== Legacy ===
- First woman librarian employed the BnF Maps and Plans section (1920)
- First to direct a collections department at the BnF (1942)
- First to preside over a professional association, ABF (1945 and again 1958)
- Laureate of the British Royal Geographical Society, receiving the Gill Prize (1961)
- Officer of the Legion of Honour

== Selected publications ==
- Davis, William Morris, and Myriem Foncin. "Les falaises et les récifs coralliens de Tahiti." Annales de Géographie. Vol. 27. No. 148/149. Armand Colin, 1918.
- Foncin, Myriem. "Versailles: étude de géographie historique." Annales de géographie. Vol. 28. No. 155. Armand Colin, 1919.
- Foncin, Myriem. "La Cité." Annales de géographie. Vol. 40. No. 227. Armand Colin, 1931.
- Foncin, Myriem. "Bibliographie des cartes anciennes." Annales de géographie. Vol. 70. No. 381. Persée-Portail des revues scientifiques en SHS, 1961.
