= Vietnamese tea =

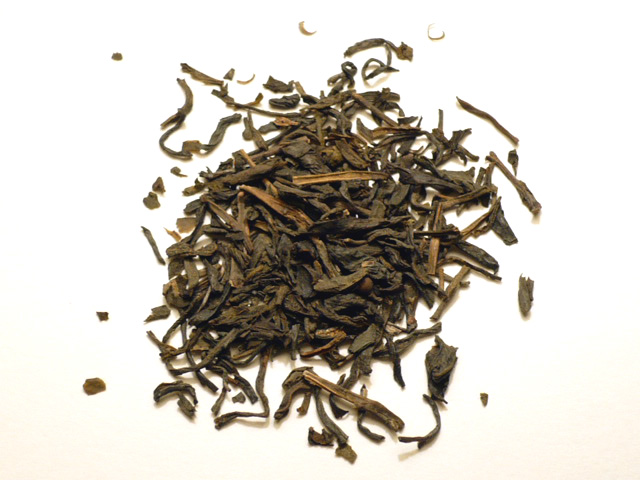
Dry leaves for Vietnamese lotus tea

Traditionally, Vietnamese tea drinking is considered a hobby of the older, more learned members in households and in society in general, although currently it has been becoming more popular in younger demographics as well. Tea drinking would accompany aristocratic activities such as composing poems, tending flowers, or simply appreciating nature. Vietnamese people generally favor lighter teas with flower fragrance, such as green tea or floral-scented white tea. Vietnam has amongst the world's oldest tea trees, dating back to 1000 years.

Green tea is the most popular amongst Vietnamese people. In 2011, it accounted for over 63% of overall retail volume sales. Vietnamese green teas have been largely unknown outside mainland Asia until the present day. Vietnamese green teas have a lower content of caffeine compared to Chinese green teas but higher caffeine levels than Japanese green teas. Recent free-enterprise initiatives are introducing these green teas to outside countries through new export activities.

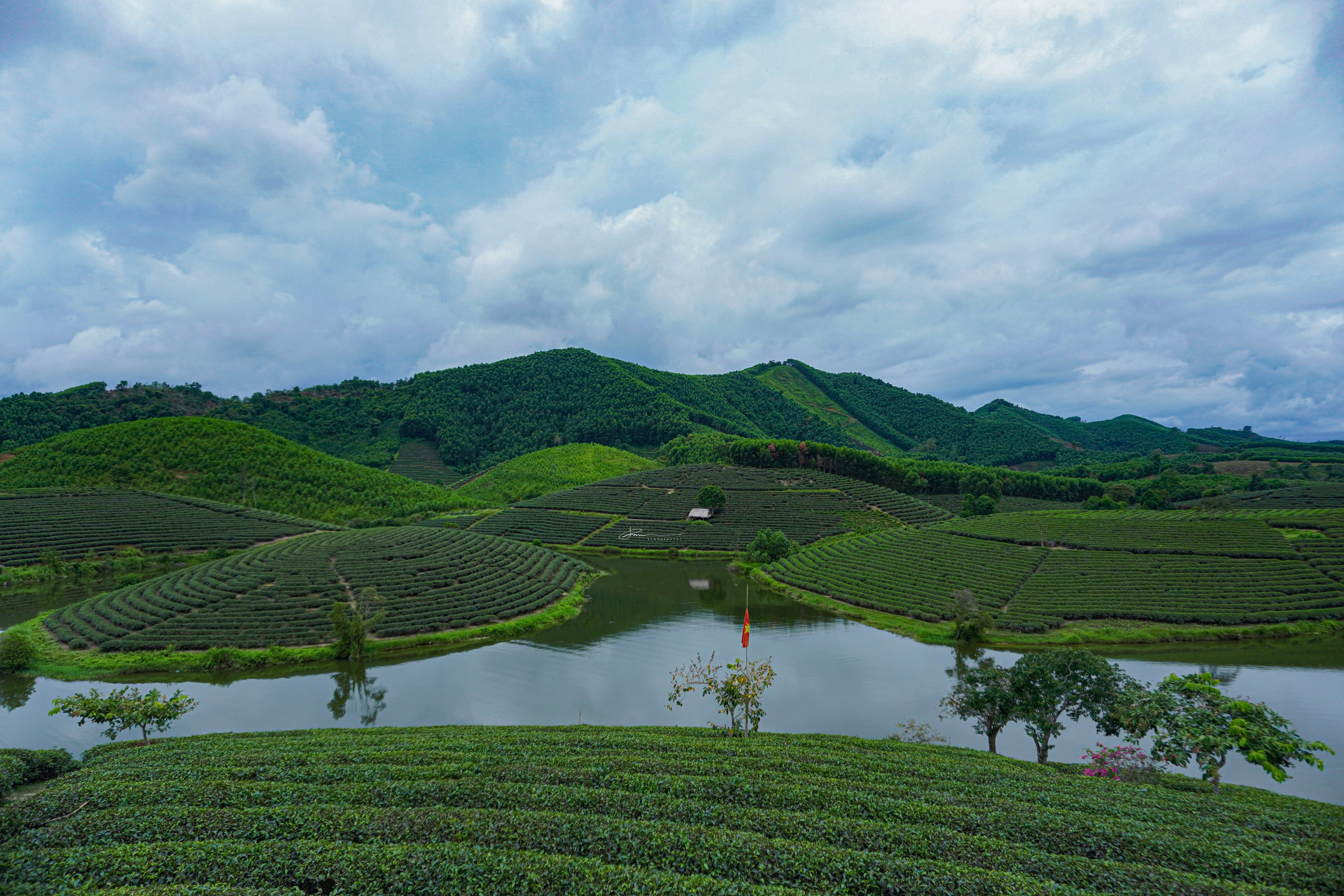
Thanh Chương Tea Hills, Nghệ An

The Vietnam Tea Association (VITA) was founded on 19 July 1998, and their goal is to protect and inform growers, consumers, and business owners of Vietnamese teas. Of the different growing regions (mostly Northern and Central highlands), Thái Nguyên is considered to have the finest quality tea throughout Vietnam (and throughout Indochina by the French during colonization).

== Tea growing regions ==
- Hà Cối, Quảng Ninh
- Tân Cương, Đồng Hỷ, La Bằng of Thái Nguyên
- Tân Sơn, Phú Thọ
- Tây Côn Lĩnh, Hà Giang
- Tà Xùa, Sơn La
- Suối Giàng, Yên Bái
- Bảo Lộc, Cầu Đất of Lâm Đồng
- Cao Bo, Hà Giang

== Types ==
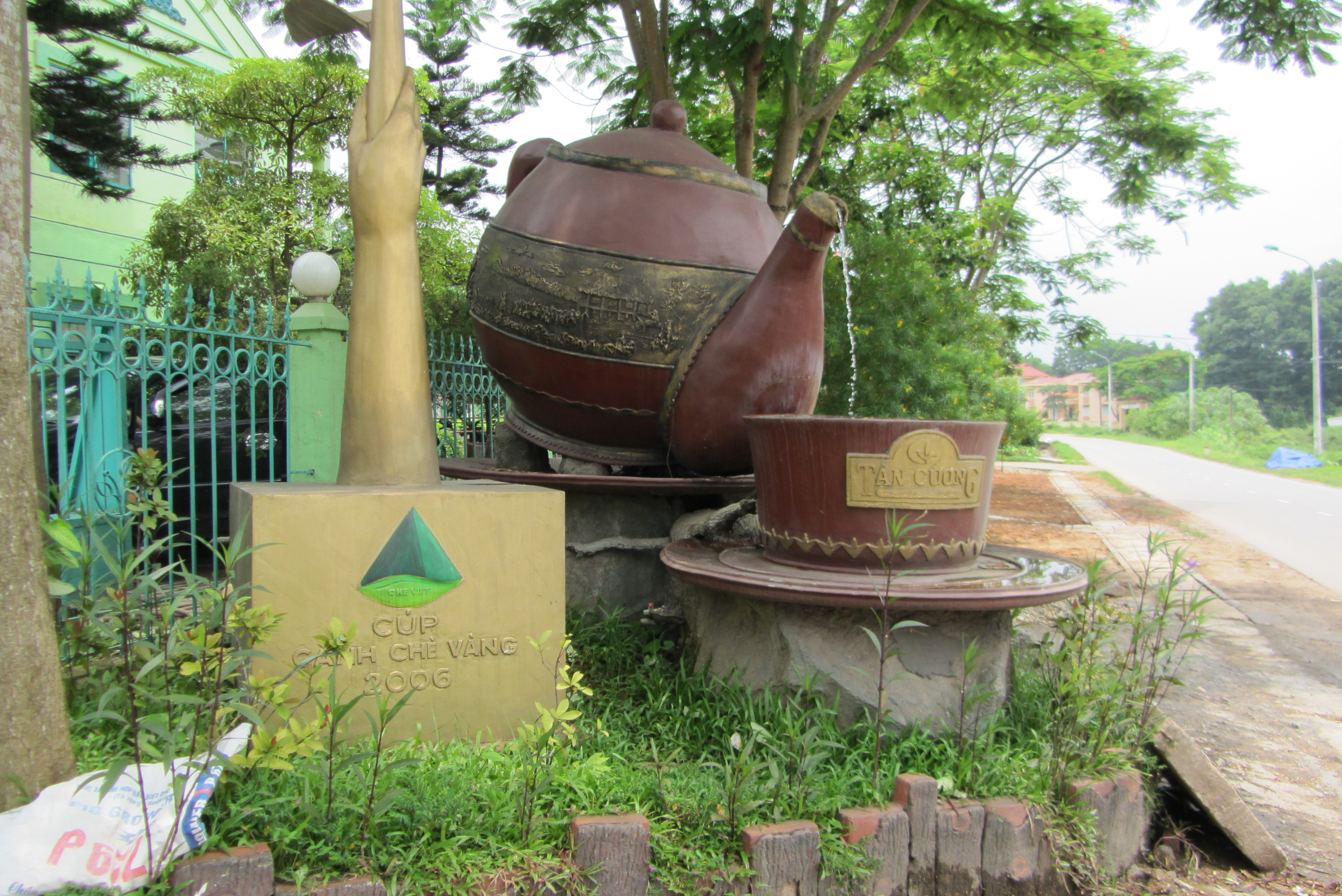
Statue of a teapot at Tân Cương commune in Thái Nguyên, a famed growing region

- Pure green tea is the standard tea in Vietnam. A high-grade Vietnamese green tea from the Tân Cương commune of Thái Nguyên has a strong bitter taste on the tip of the tongue, but later transforms to deep, lingering sweetness. Tân Cương tea has different grades such as đinh nõn, tôm nõn, móc câu.
- Lotus tea (trà sen) is a specialty product of the Vietnamese tea industry. Generally, high-quality green tea leaves are placed within lotus flowers for a day to acquire the scent, then the tea leaves are removed and packaged. A higher grade of lotus tea is made with lotus petals mixed in with high-quality green tea leaves. Green tea style of Vietnam is to roll the leaves gently into crescents, and minimal handling. Vietnamese green teas are typically very potent. They are best brewed for most tastes for under 2 minutes using water temperature of 70 °C (160 °F). Beyond this time the tea will acquire a bitter taste that is nevertheless preferred by many tea lovers, as it reflects the potency of the tea leaves. Some tea lovers will brew 3-4 times from one set of leaves, preferring the narrower flavor range of the later brewings.
- Jasmine tea (trà lài) is produced in two grades similar to lotus tea. Jasmine tea has a more profound aroma than lotus tea, and lotus tea has a sweeter taste. While lotus tea is considered a specialty and is reserved for events or special meals, jasmine tea is popular as a "chaser" for Vietnamese iced coffee, and is poured into the glass after the coffee is consumed, allowed to chill, and then enjoyed as a follow-up to the iced coffee in coffee shop cafes, particularly in the night life of major cities, where coffee shops are a popular social rendezvous on hot evenings.
- Trà shan tuyết are made from ancient tea trees in Lào Cai, Yên Bái and Ha Giang province.
- Trà sâm dứa is a Central Vietnam delicacy, made from a herbal mix of green tea, jasmine, Aglaia duperreana flower, basil and pandan leaves.
- Trà atiso (artichoke tea) this is a herbal tea made from the leaves, root, stalk, and flower of the artichoke plant. The tea is a specialty of the Lam-Dong highland region, where an abundance of artichokes is grown.
- Trà đắng (kuding tea), called bitter tea because of its taste. Due to its antioxidant activities, this bitter tea is prescribed to patients that suffer headaches, high blood pressure, cold fever and diabetes.
- Trà hoa vàng made from the leaves of Camellia chrysantha plant.
- Chè nụ (Bud tea): made only from the bud of the tea flower.
- Chè vối: made from the buds and leaves of cleistocalyx operculatus tree.

Other common types of Vietnamese flower-infused tea are chrysanthemum tea (trà cúc), Aglaia tea (trà ngâu, tea infused with the flower from the Aglaia duperreana plant), giảo cổ lam, hà thủ ô and trà sói, tea infused with the flower from the Chloranthaceae family.
