= Hôtel Tubeuf =

Hôtel particulier in Paris, France

Coordinates: 48.86678°N 2.33857°E

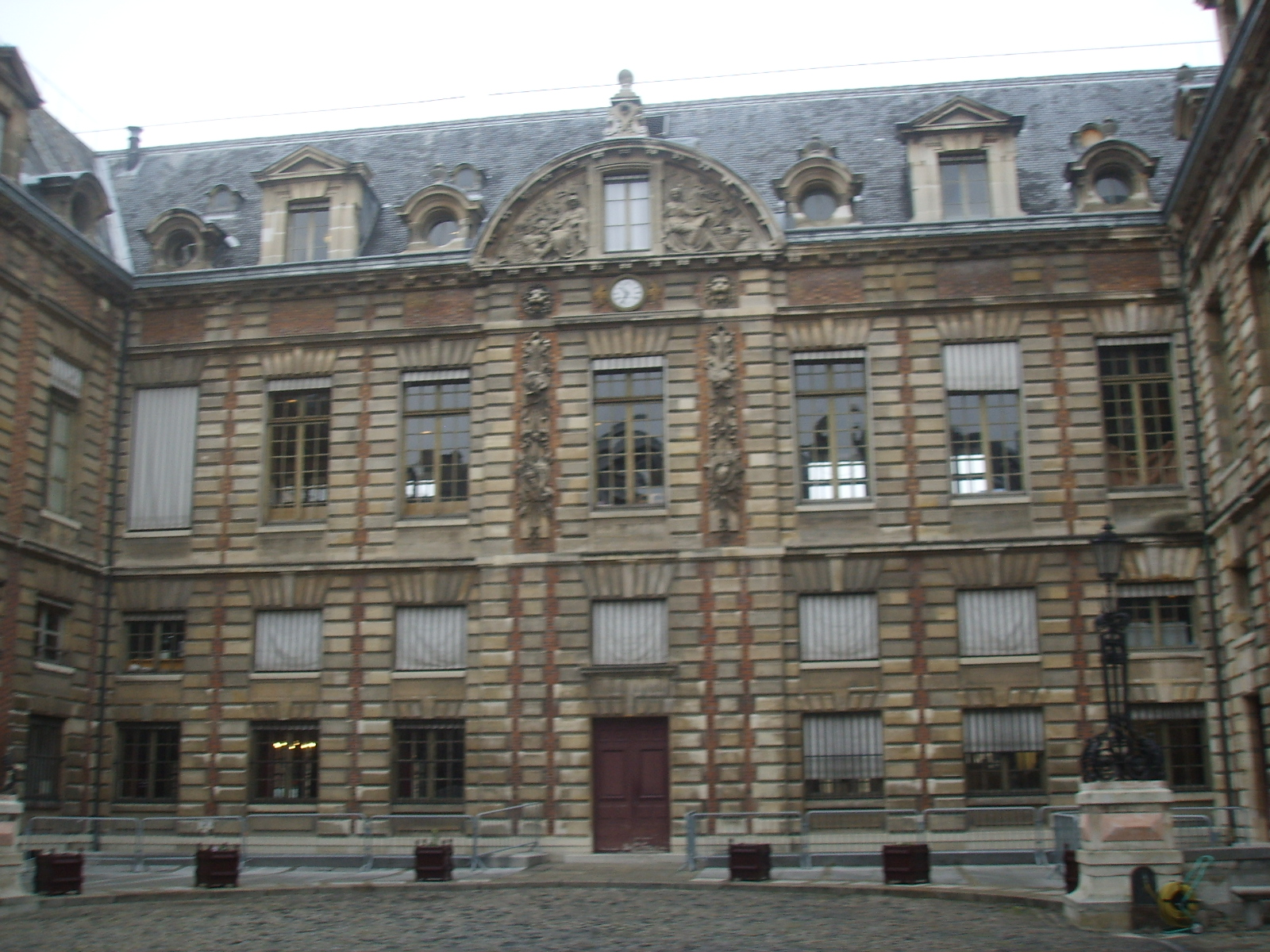
- South façade of the corps de logis, facing the entrance courtyard
- Interactive map of the Hôtel Tubeuf area

General information
- Architectural style: French Baroque
- Location: 8 Rue des Petits Champs, Paris, France
- Construction started: 1635

Design and construction
- Architects: Jean Thiriot; François Mansart

The Hôtel Tubeuf (French pronunciation: [otɛl tybœf]) is the generally used name for a hôtel particulier at 8, rue des Petits-Champs in Paris, France, now part of the Site Richelieu of the Bibliothèque nationale de France (French National Library). It was successively known as the Hôtel Duret de Chevry (1635-1641), Hôtel Tubeuf from 1641 to 1649, Palais Mazarin from 1649 to 1720, when it became the seat of John Law's Company. The latter was reorganized in 1723 as the French Indies Company and remained there until its demise in 1769. The building then became the seat of the French Treasury until 1826, when it was absorbed by the National Library.

== History ==
=== Hôtel Duret de Chevry ===
The current building was originally erected in 1635 to the designs of the French architect Jean Thiriot for Charles Duret de Chevry, president of the Chambre des Comptes. It was still unfinished when Duret de Chevry died in September 1636, and his son sold it in 1641.

=== Hôtel Tubeuf ===
Financier Jacques Tubeuf purchased the property in 1641. In 1642, he erected three buildings immediately to the west, extending to the corner of the rue des Petits-Champs with the rue de Richelieu, which came to be known as the Petit Hôtel Tubeuf.

=== Palais Mazarin ===
In 1643, Tubeuf rented the combined property to Cardinal Mazarin. In the mid-1640s, Mazarin directed the property's expansion northwards on a design by François Mansart. The long street-level room thus created became known as the Galerie Mansart, and the upper level as the Galerie Mazarin. Both are still extant.

In 1649, Mazarin purchase the whole compound from Tubeuf and started extending it northwards along the rue de Richelieu. This extension, which took the form of a long gallery, was intended for Mazarin's massive book collection, the origin of the Bibliothèque Mazarine. Following Mazarin's death in 1661, the part of the Palais Mazarin bordering the rue de Richelieu went to the late cardinal's nephew, Philippe Jules Mancini, Duke of Nevers, and was subsequently known as the Hôtel de Nevers. The rest of the Palais Mazarin went to another nephew, Armand Charles de La Porte, 2nd Duke of La Meilleraye. In 1665, the visiting Gian Lorenzo Bernini while working on his project for the Louvre Palace. After La Meilleraye's death in 1713, it was inherited by his son Paul Jules de La Porte, Duke Mazarin and of La Meilleraye.

=== Hôtel de la Compagnie des Indes ===
In 1720, John Law acquired the Palais Mazarin (namely, the Hôtel Tubeuf and Petit Hôtel Tubeuf) by swapping it against his Hôtel Langlée (a few blocks further west on current address 46-50 rue des Petits-Champs, demolished in 1827), which Law however kept as his Parisian home until his flight from France in December 1720. Law repurposed the Hôtel Tubeuf as the seat of his Indies Company, and the Galerie Mansart as the new venue of the Paris Bourse.

=== Hôtel du Trésor ===
In 1769, the Indies Company was liquidated and the building was repurposed for France's finance ministry of Trésor Royal. The Louisiana Purchase Treaty was signed there on 30 April 1803.

=== National Library ===
In 1826, the Treasury moved to a new building on rue de Rivoli (burnt by arson during the Paris Commune and replaced by the Hôtel Continental, later Westin Paris Vendôme). The former Hôtel Tubeuf was absorbed by the National Library, which had been located in the adjacent Hôtel de Nevers since 1724. Part of it hosted the Cabinet des Médailles, now the BnF Museum which includes the Galerie Mansart and Galerie Mazarin among its exhibition spaces.

Other parts became the location of the Library's departments of prints and photographs (Département des estampes et de la photographie) and of maps and plans (Département des cartes et plans). A renovation and expansion of the space for Maps and Plans was conducted from 1946 to 1954 by the Library's cartography chief Myriem Foncin and the chief architect Michel Roux-Spitz.

The Hôtel Tubeuf was declared a monument historique in 1983.

== Description ==
The Hôtel Tubeuf is a typical hôtel particulier with a central corps de logis set between an entrance courtyard and a garden. The entrance courtyard is on the south side and was formerly enclosed on all sides. The street entrance seen today was constructed in the 18th century. The street facade as it existed in the 17th century can be seen in an engraving by Jean Marot.

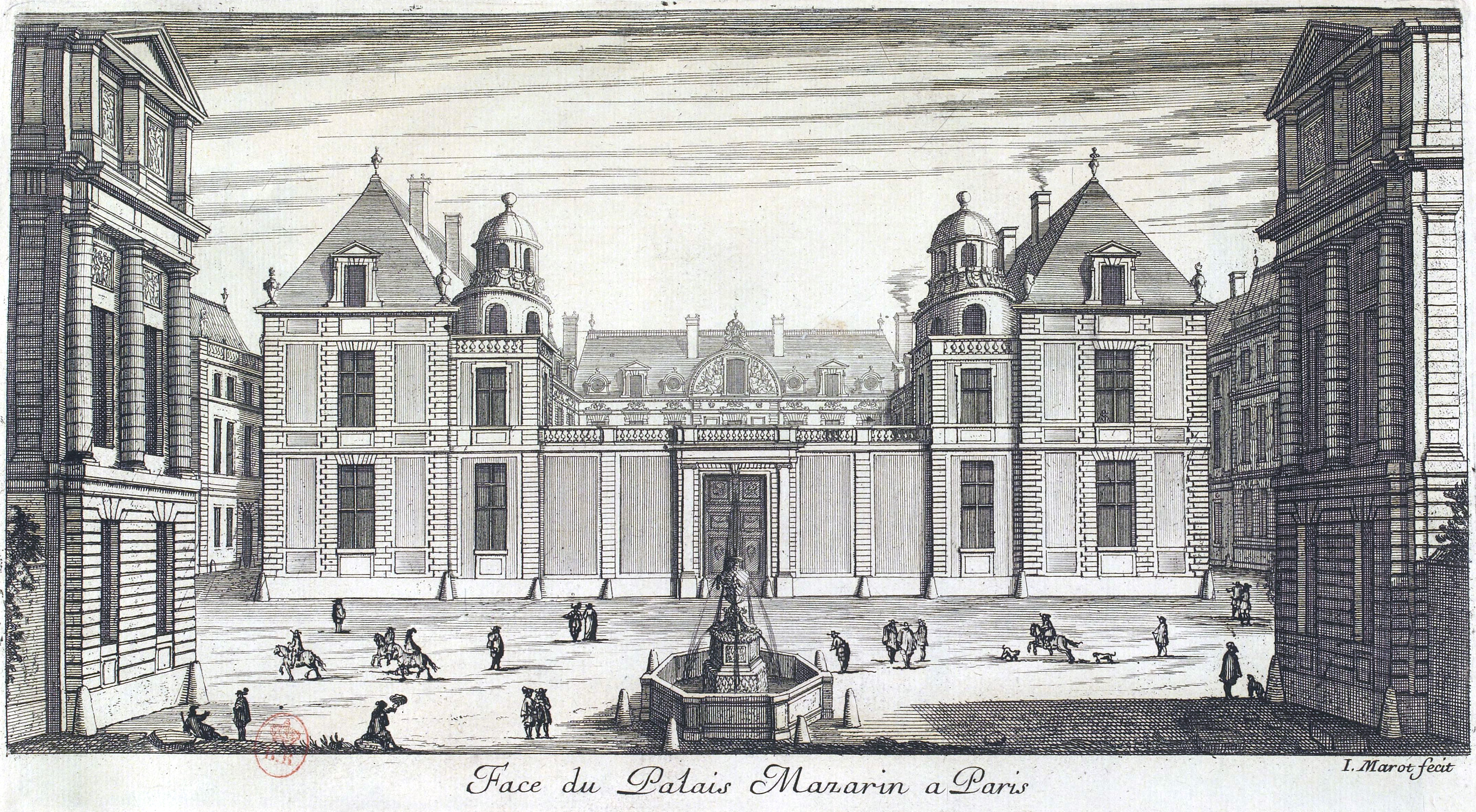
Street front of the Hôtel Tubeuf in the 17th century, engraved by Jean Marot

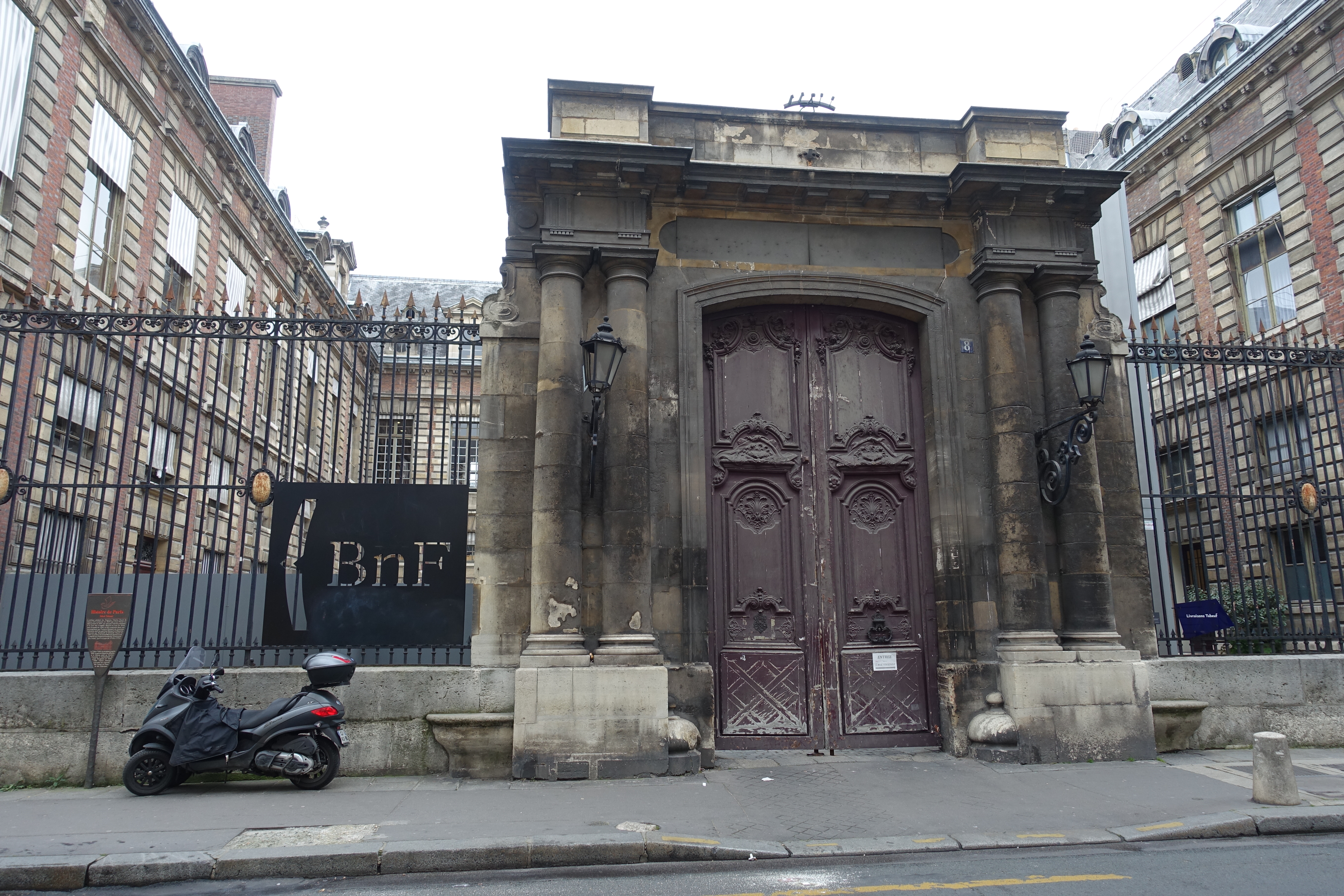
Street front in 2016

The Hôtel Tubeuf is one of the last and most splendid examples in Paris of brick-and-stone architecture (popular in France in the early 17th century). Brick-and-stone had already gone out of style at the time this hôtel was built, but was used at the request of Duret. The building reflects the architect's fondness for elaborate rustication, stone chaines and quoins, and uncommonly shaped pediments decorated in low-relief.

A garden gallery, designed by François Mansart ca. 1644–45, was later added to the Hôtel Tubeuf. Of Mansart's designs only the exterior, and not the interior, of the garden gallery survives in somewhat altered form, with crossed quivers and garlands typical of Mansart visible above the upper windows.

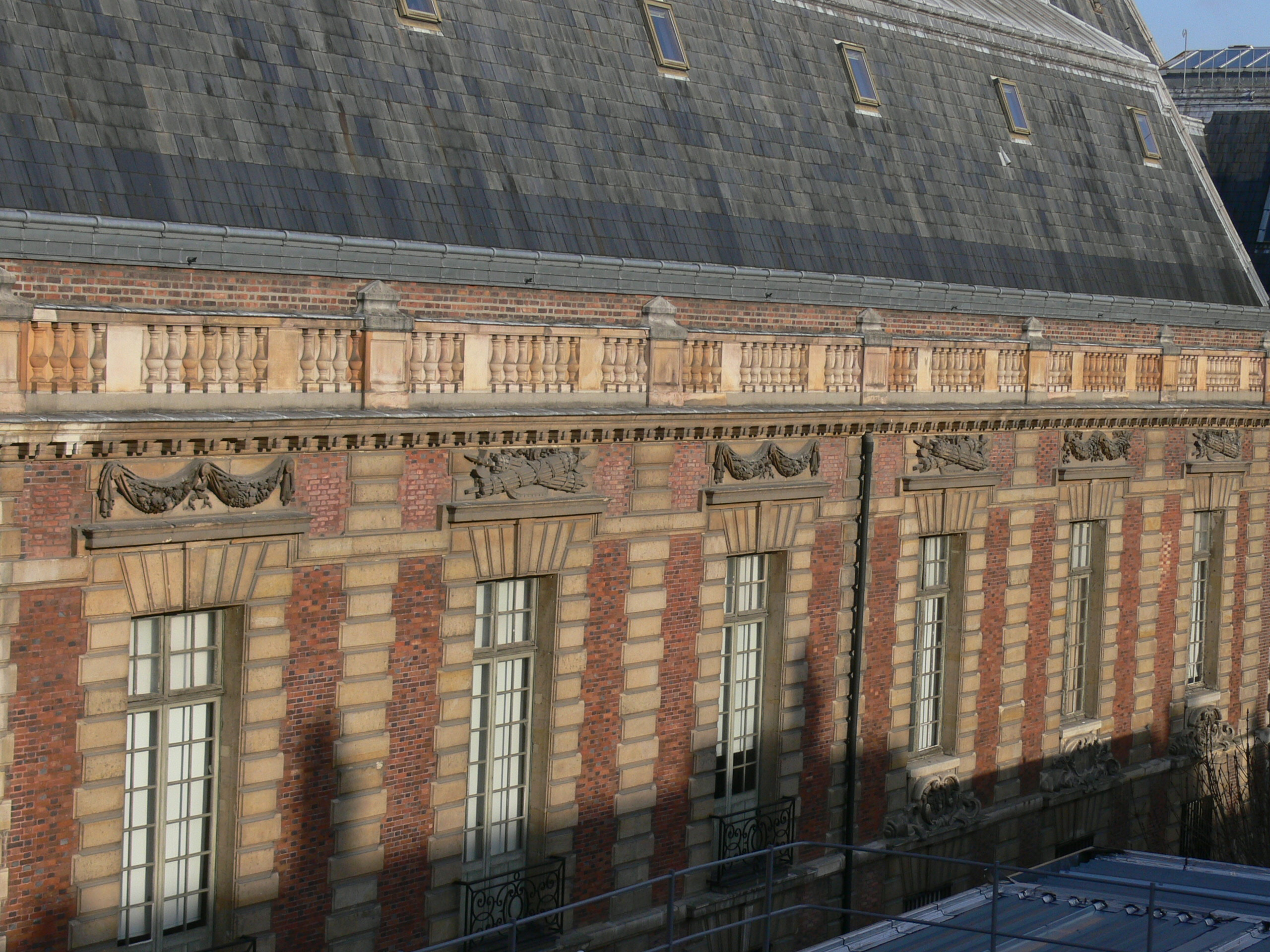
Garden gallery of the Hôtel Tubeuf

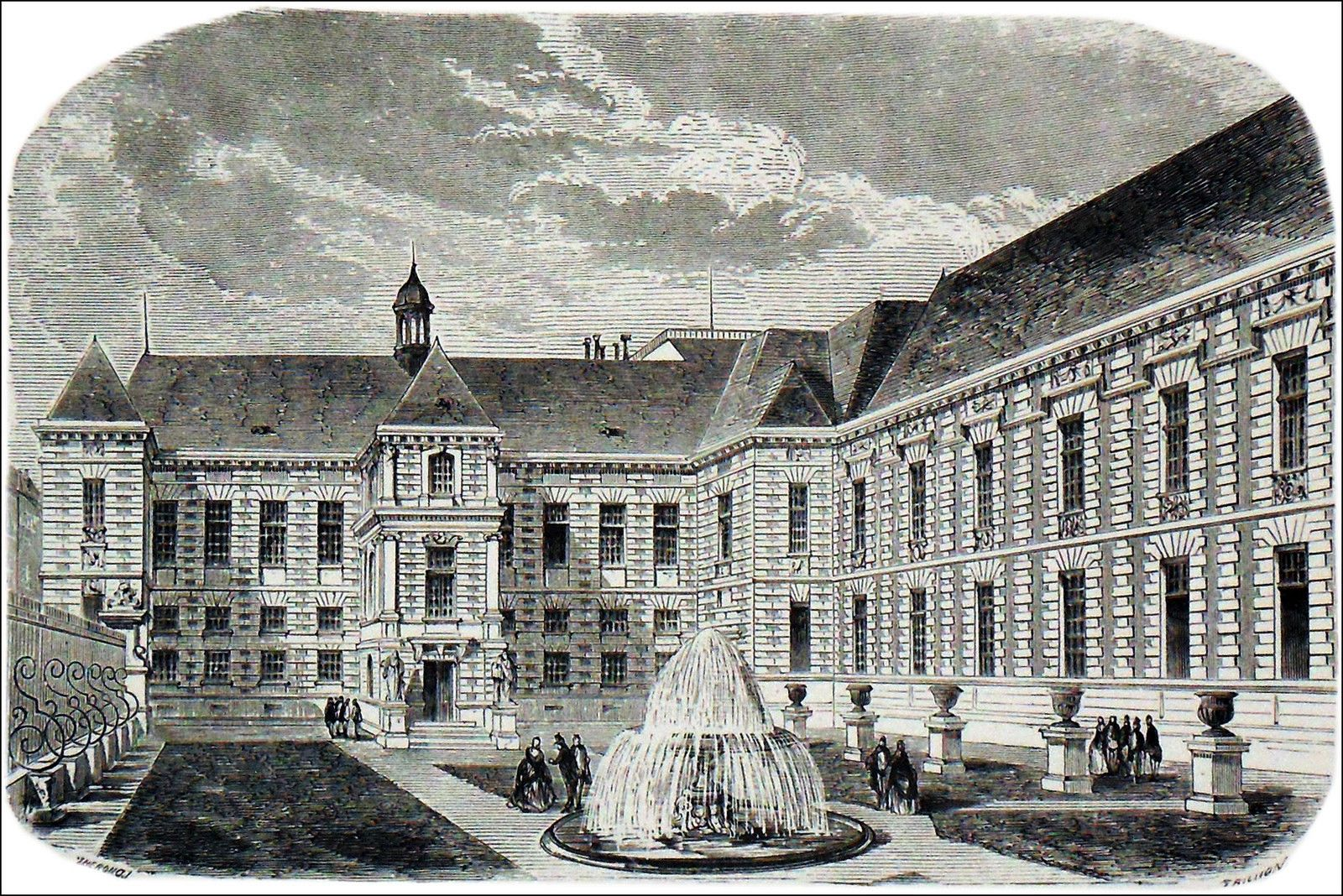
View of the garden side c. 1890

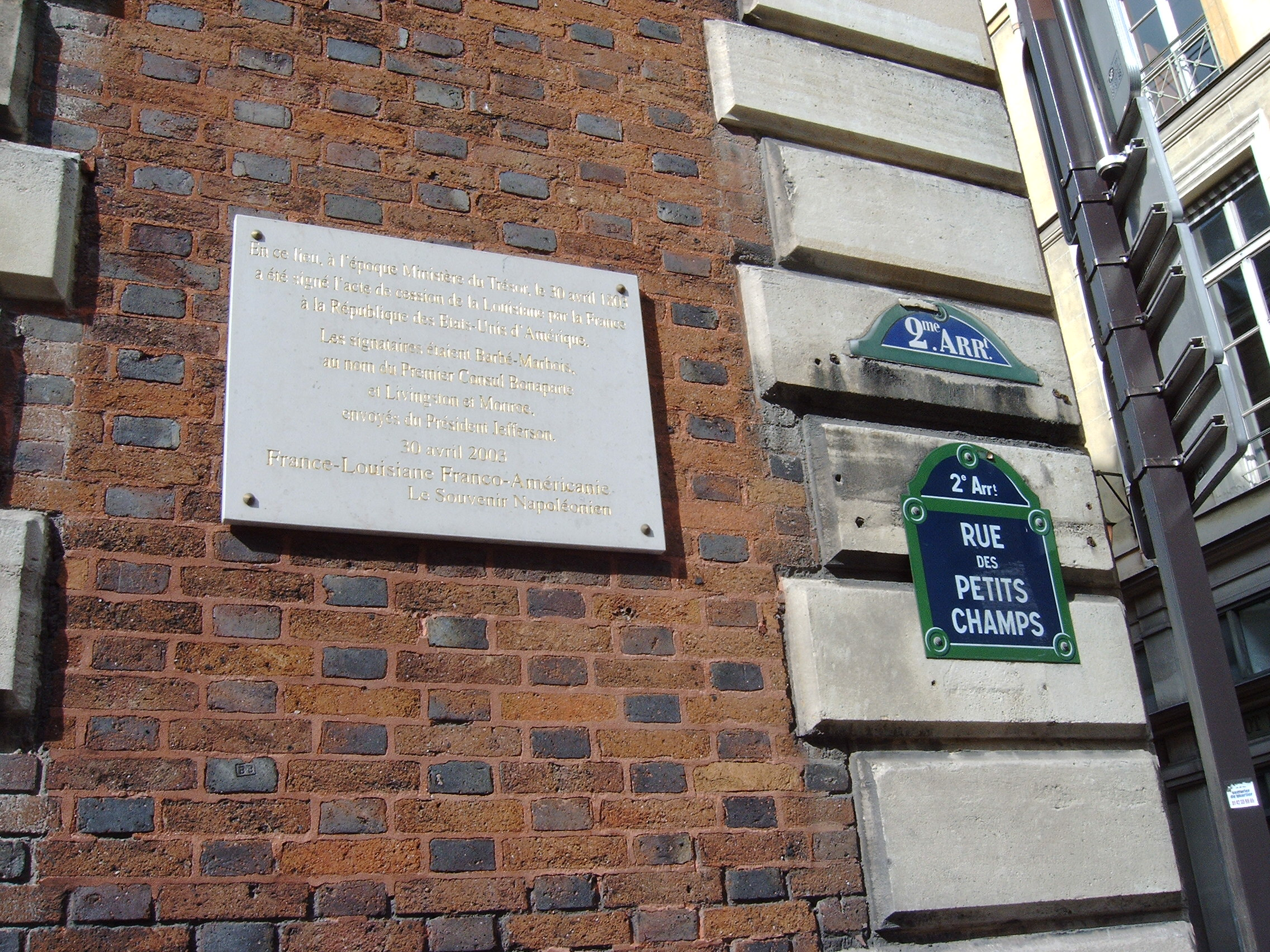
Plaque on the Hôtel Tubeuf commemorating the signing of the Louisiana Purchase Treaty

== See also ==
- Hôtel de Nevers (rue de Richelieu)
- Hôtel de Nevers (left bank)
- Hôtel Duret de Chevry, rue de Parc-Royal
- Place Dauphine

== Bibliography ==
- Ayers, Andrew (2004). The Architecture of Paris. Stuttgart; London: Edition Axel Menges. ISBN 9783930698967.
- Babelon, Jean-Pierre (1996). "Thiriot, Jean", vol. 30, p. 734–735, in The Dictionary of Art (34 vols.), edited by Jane Turner. New York: Grove. ISBN 9781884446009.
- Blunt, Anthony; Beresford, Richard (1999). Art and Architecture in France, 1500–1700, 5th edition. New Haven, Connecticut: Yale University Press. ISBN 9780300077483.
- Braham, Allan; Smith, Peter (1973). François Mansart, 2 volumes. London: A. Zwemmer. ISBN 9780302022511.
- Chappet, Alain; Martin, Roger; Pigeard, Alain (2005). Le guide de Napoleon: 4000 lieux de mémoire pour revivre l'épopée. Paris: Tallandier. ISBN 9782847342468.
- Deutsch, Kristina (2015). Jean Marot : Un graveur d'architecture à l'époque de Louis XIV. Berlin: De Gruyter. ISBN 9783110375954.
