= Vignot =

- Commune
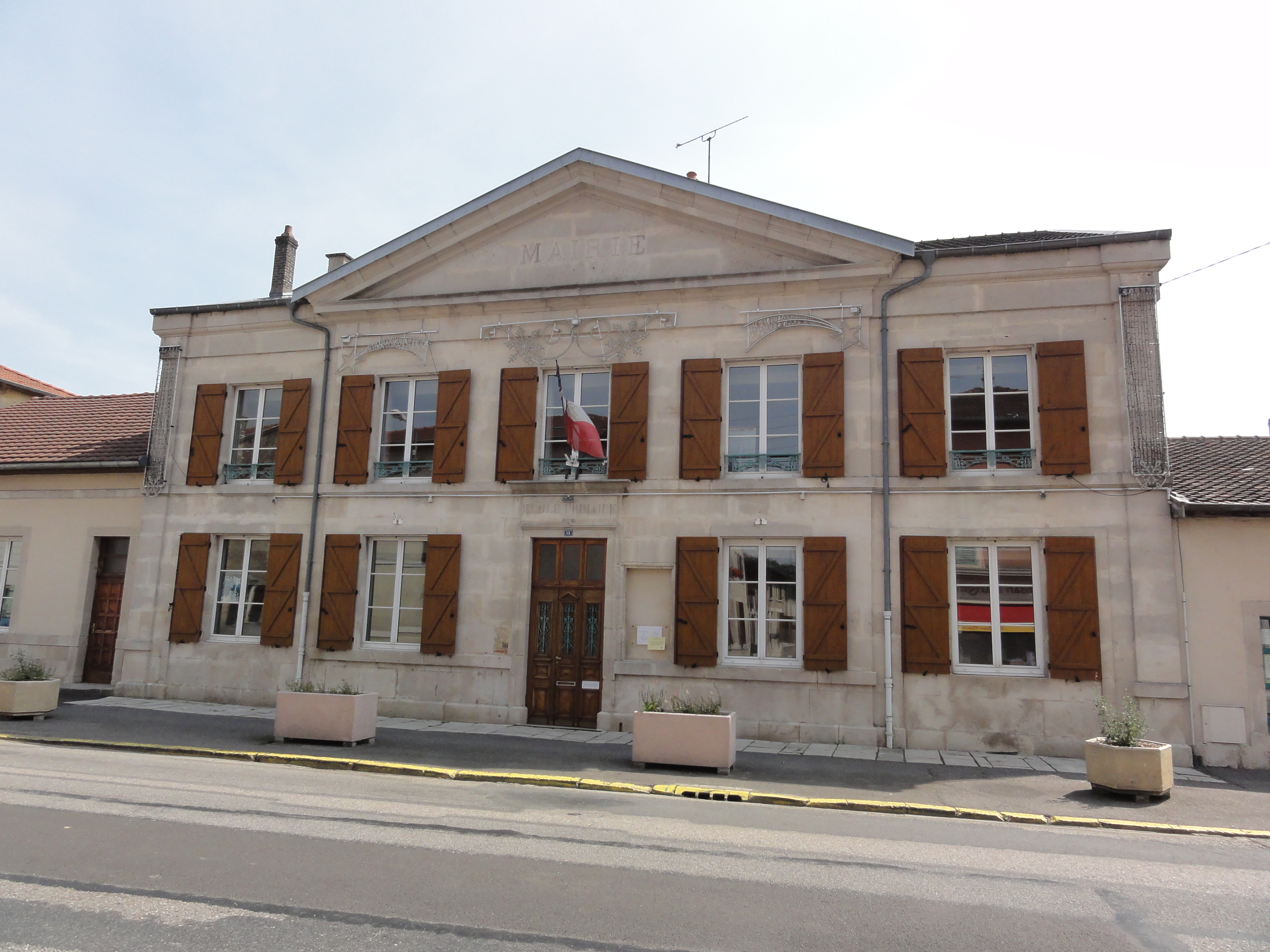
- The town hall in Vignot

- Coat of arms
- Location of Vignot
- Location within France Location within Grand Est
- Coordinates: 48°46′29″N 5°36′34″E
- Country: France
- Region: Grand Est
- Department: Meuse
- Arrondissement: Commercy
- Canton: Commercy

Government
  - Mayor (2020–2026): Nicolas Millot
- Area^{1}: 16.02 km^{2} (6.19 sq mi)
- Elevation: 232 m (761 ft)
- Highest elevation: 377 m (1,237 ft)
- Lowest elevation: 225 m (738 ft)
- Population (2023): 1,269
  - Density: 79.21/km^{2} (205.2/sq mi)
- Time zone: UTC+01:00 (CET)
  - Summer (DST): UTC+02:00 (CEST)
- INSEE/Postal code: 55553 /55200
- ^{1} French Land Register data, which excludes lakes, ponds, glaciers > 1 km^{2} (0.386 sq mi or 247 acres) and river estuaries.

Vignot (French pronunciation: [viɲo]) is a commune in the Meuse department in Grand Est in north-eastern France. The 17th-century Renaissance architect Jean Thiriot was born in Vignot in 1590.

== See also ==
- Communes of the Meuse department
- Parc naturel régional de Lorraine
