= Jean Chaufourier =

French landscape painter and engraver

Jean Chaufourier (1675–1757) was a French landscape painter and engraver. He was born in Paris. He married a daughter of Gerard Edelinck, who was also an engraver. Chaufourier taught drawing to Pierre-Jean Mariette. He was received into the Royal Academy of Painting and Sculpture in 1735, and died at St. Germain-en-Laye in 1757. There are three of his drawings in the Louvre, and a set of eight landscapes engraved by him has survived.
