= Taewon Bang clan =

Korean clan

- Country: Korea
- Current region: Taiyuan
- Founder: Bang Bal

Taewon Bang clan (Korean: 태원 방씨; Hanja: 太原 龐氏) was one of the Korean clans. Their Bon-gwan was in Taiyuan, Shanxi, China. According to the research in 2000, the number of Taewon Bang clan was 52. Their founder was Bang Bal who was a general in Ming dynasty, China and was naturalized in Joseon.

== See also ==
- Korean clan names of foreign origin
