= Jean Thiriot =

French architect

Jean Thiriot (1590 – 24 January 1649) was a 17th-century French architect active under the order of Louis XIII.

== Youth ==
Jean Thiriot was born at Vignot in Lorraine. He worked with his father, as a stonemason in the quarries of Euville, a neighbouring village. In 1616, at the age of 26, he had to face the death of his father and left for Paris, feeling in him special aptitudes for construction.

== Arrival in Paris ==
His beginnings were difficult, and he was forced to work for an entrepreneur as a stonemason. What he had once learned from his father was very useful to him and he took advantage of it to perfect himself.

In 1611, Queen Marie de' Medici had bought the Luxembourg hotel wishing to build a palace there according to the plans of the one her father lived in at Florence. She entrusted the work to her architect, Salomon de Brosse. The latter then called on all construction workers likely to be able to help him in his task. Jean Thiriot saw in it a formidable opportunity to extricate himself from his condition. A highly motivated and deserving worker, he paid particular attention to his masters, always following their advice in order to perfect his art. That is why de Brosse decided to offer him the direction of a large stonemasons' workshop.

== Career ==
Born in Vignot, Jean Thiriot was not subject to royal authority; indeed, Lorraine at that time was not included in the kingdom of France. He decided however to give up this advantage and remain in Paris, convinced that his destiny was here, and that he would realize his dreams there. Moreover, he informed his brother of this decision through numerous letters, which they exchanged for years.

It is the political context of the time that decided his future. Indeed, the queen had taken Concino Concini under her wing, even naming him Marshal of France when he had never carried arms. His son, Louis XIII - then newly married to a Spanish woman - subsequently returned to Paris and had Marshal Concini murdered; the queen, for her part, was forced into exile in Blois.

The queen's relatives and sympathizers were frowned upon, and the unfortunate architect was removed from his post to be replaced as quickly by Clément II Métezeau, to whom de Brosse had promised to recommend his best workers. Thiriot was one of them, and it is thus that in 1617, he was found working on the construction of the portal of the chapel of the Sorbonne, which did not prevent him from thinking of his master whose absence made him very sad.

His brother came to visit him in Paris. They toured the city and its monuments together, constantly comparing them to his own work to give his brother an idea.

From 1617 to 1624, the epistolary correspondence between Jean and his brother was interrupted. Yet it was during this period that the Queen Mother was recalled, along with her faithful architect. Thus, Brosse was able to finish the Luxembourg, or the hall of the lost steps of the courthouse.

One then finds traces of Jean Thiriot in May 1624 for the construction of the aqueduc of Arcueil, at his master's side. He did not fail to compare it to the Roman aqueduct that he saw between Pont-à-Mousson and Metz to report to his brother on the scope of the work. He then lived in Gentilly, more quiet than in Paris. The place reminded him of Vignot, his native village, where he had sworn to return when he could. Indeed, it was not through negligence for his family that he had left Lorraine but only because he was convinced that he had talent.

The work on the aqueduct was completed on 28 September 1624, and Jean Thiriot invited his brother to the inauguration during which de Brosse praised the merits of his main helper to Cardinal de Richelieu whose reaction was rather mitigated.

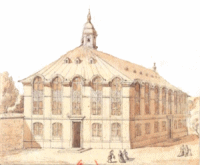
Temple Protestant de Charenton.

The following winter was then the opportunity to return to Lorraine. He returned in 1625 to undertake, alongside Salomon de Brosse, the construction of a Protestant temple at Charenton. He was not happy about the prospect of this project; he did not know how to position himself in front of this building intended for the "false gods". But his confessor assured him that there was nothing wrong with building it, because he could, at the same time, continue his struggle against Protestants.

Note: after the Edict of Fontainebleau, said temple was destroyed.

In 1626, Messire de Brosse died, to the great displeasure of his assistant who he nevertheless recommended before dying to the king's architect, Clément Métézeau. The latter appreciated him and even entrusted him with the works of the Tuileries and the Louvre. The king often came to visit the works, accompanied by the cardinal who deigned to remember the young stonemason presented by de Brosse, having promised him his protection.

The following year, Jean Thiriot, then master mason, was to be met at La Rochelle on a building site which will soon make his fame.

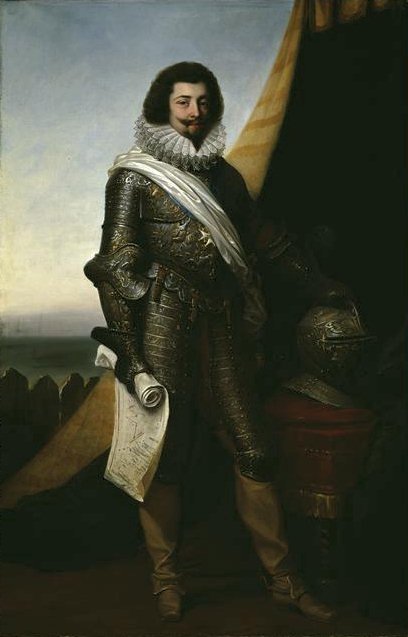
François de Bassompierre

== The dike of La Rochelle ==
Note: it was to reduce to its last extremity Protestantism of which it was the principal seat that the cardinal had taken this city. The country was then involved in the Thirty Years' War.

This construction was, for Métézeau and himself, the occasion to redeem himself from the past construction of the Protestant temple of Charenton. In fact, the construction of the dike was intended to prevent maritime intrusions, particularly by the English, and thus protect the city from the so feared Huguenots. The cardinal, very favourable to this project, recommended them to François de Bassompierre. The latter was also seduced and ordered that they be housed in his quarters while awaiting the final agreement of the cardinal which soon arrived and thus marked the beginning of the work. Métézeau worked on the North bank, Thiriot - headed by M. de Schomberg, Marshal of France - on the South bank. During this undertaking, Jean Thiriot discovered a phenomenon still unknown for him: the tide. This phenomenon complicated his work, as he told to his brother in a letter dated late 1627. At that time, mail transport was not as easy as it is today and it was necessary to wait for a favourable opportunity to correspond over long distances. This letter was therefore entrusted to a young man from Saint Mihiel, from the Vaubécourt regiment who, wounded at La Rochelle, was to return to Lorraine.

Note: in January 1627, a sergeant-major in the Rambure regiment named Fabert (real name Abraham de Fabert d'Esternay) was intimately bound to Jean Thiriot. The intelligence and bravery of this Messin seduced him. Fabert then entrusted him with his idea as to the most convenient way to move the "enormous burdens that one sank at sea". Thiriot could only approve of an idea that seemed ingenious to him, unlike most of his peers who remained very critical of a man who was not of the trade. The facts proved Fabert's insight, silencing the jealous. This success delighted Thiriot, convinced that the Messin deserved it.

The works of La Rochelle attracted scholars who admired the scale of the project. Among them, was Jacques Callot, also from Lorraine (Nancy).

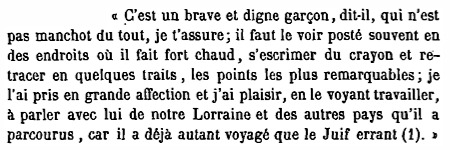
Quote from a letter by Jean Thiriot.

The sea was becoming deeper and deeper, and it was no longer possible to throw stones at sight. The idea was then to load vessels attached together with cemented masonry and to go and ground them on the dike, to then cover them with stones and rubble. These ships, before reaching their destination, were the target of fires perpetrated by the besieged who never failed to compromise the work that was particularly hostile to them.

== Fall of the Protestants at La Rochelle ==
After struggling for many months, the Protestants had to surrender on 28 October 1628. The population was decimated and the survivors very weakened by famine and epidemics. The Catholic religion was restored, for the greater happiness of the cardinal. Jean Thiriot having largely participated in the success of this undertaking, he then received "the title and the emoluments of engineer-architect of the buildings of the king, the nickname of captain, with letters of nobility and coat of arms consisting of a mallet whose handle is engaged between the branches of a compass; for stamp, an open helmet beside, and for support, two naked geniuses".

His coat of arms was engraved on the pediment of his father's house in Vignot; they were rediscovered in 1856 on a stone from the mayor's house (then, a certain M. Delignière).

== Death ==
Thiriot died on 24 January 1649, and he was buried in the Rosary chapel of the church Saint Honest of Yerres, where he had a country house built. This epitaph can be read on his grave:

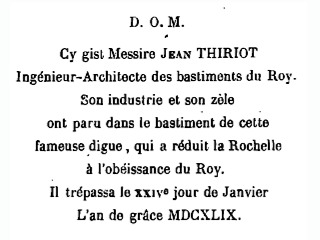
Tomb of Jean Thiriot.

== Controversies ==
The history and career of the above-mentioned Jean Thiriot were the subject of many versions which all differ on the facts, and especially on the importance of his role in the construction of the La Rochelle dike. This raises the question of the authenticity of a story dating back several decades.
