= Taewon Yi clan =

Korean clan from Shaanxi, China

- Country: Korea
- Current region: Taiyuan
- Founder: Lee Gwi ji

The Taewon Yi clan (Korean: 태원 이씨; Hanja: 太原 李氏) is a Korean clans. Their Bon-gwan is in Taiyuan, Shanxi, China. According to the census held in 2000, the number of Taiyuan Lee clan was 670. Their founder was Yi Gwi ji. He was originally from Taiyuan during the Song dynasty in China, and he worked as government officer during Chungnyeol of Goryeo period. His successor supported Taejo of Joseon, and the successor was appointed as Gongsin (功臣) in Joseon.

== See also ==
- Korean clan names of foreign origin
