= Hôtel de Nevers (rue de Richelieu) =

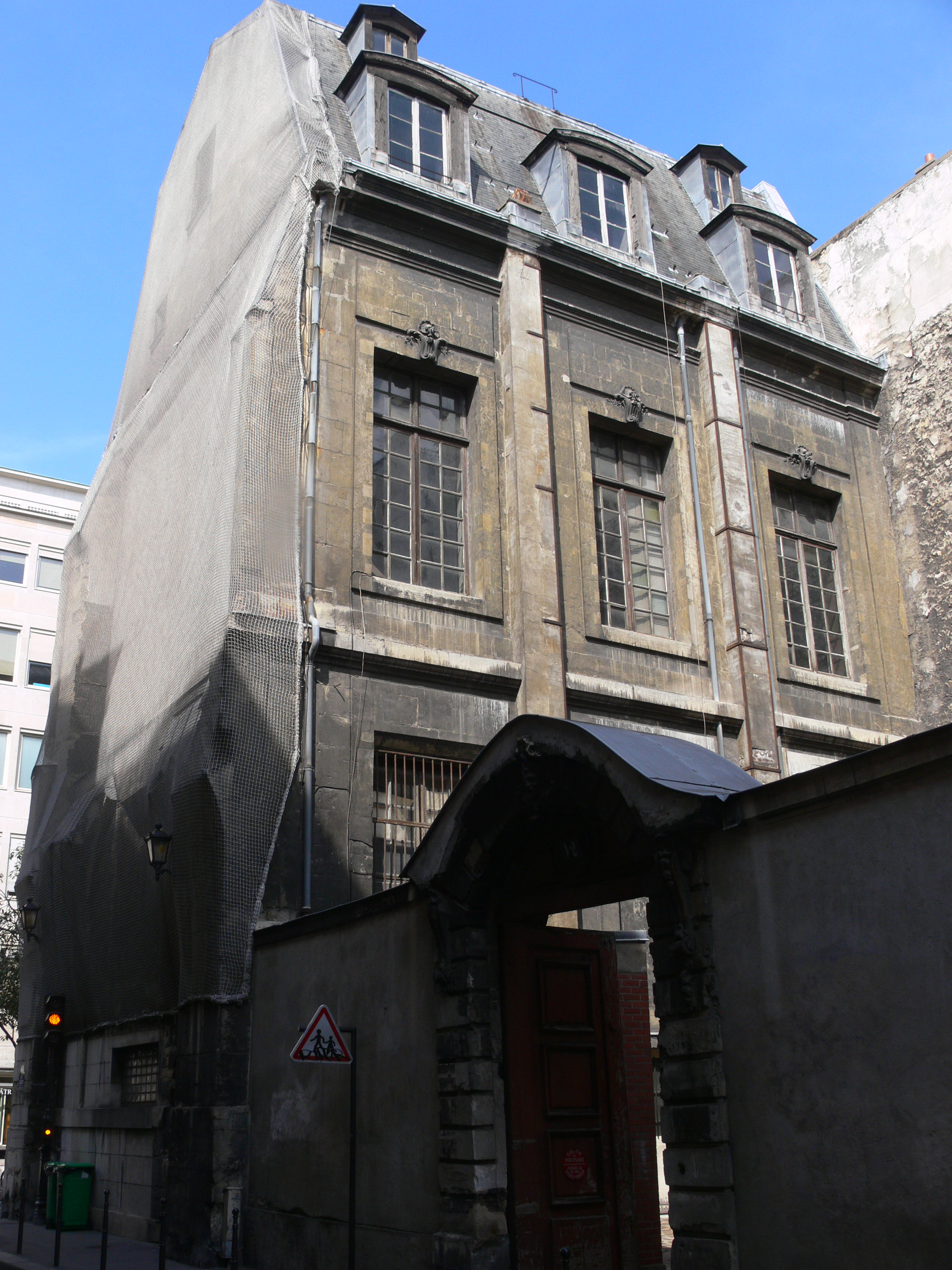
- Remaining fragment of the Hôtel de Nevers on the rue de Richelieu, viewed from the back
- Interactive map of Hôtel de Nevers
- Location: 12 rue Colbert and 58bis rue de Richelieu, Paris
- Coordinates: 48°52′06″N 2°20′18″E
- Designer: Pierre Le Muet
- Type: Hôtel particulier
- Beginning date: 1646
- Completion date: 1648
- Dismantled date: 1859 (mostly)

The Hôtel de Nevers (French pronunciation: [otɛl də nəvɛʁ]) was an aristocratic townhouse (hôtel particulier) in Paris, which was located on the right bank on the east side of the rue de Richelieu. It was previously part of Jules Mazarin's Palais Mazarin, but upon his death in 1661, the palace was divided among his heirs, and the western section along the rue de Richelieu became the Hôtel de Nevers. In 1721 it was incorporated into the Bibliothèque du Roi (Royal Library). With the growth of the library collections, the Hôtel de Nevers became inadequate for its purpose. Most of the original Hôtel de Nevers was obliterated in 1859, after Napoleon III asked the architect Henri Labrouste to remodel and extensively rebuild the entire site (now the Site Richelieu of the Bibliothèque Nationale de France). Only a remnant of the Hôtel de Nevers remains. It was declared a monument historique in 1975.

== See also ==
- Hôtel Tubeuf

== Sources ==
- Ayers, Andrew (2004). The Architecture of Paris. Stuttgart; London: Edition Axel Menges. ISBN 9783930698967.
