= Thái Nguyên =

Thái Nguyên may refer to:

- Thái Nguyên province, a province in northeastern Vietnam
- Thái Nguyên (city), former provincial city of Thái Nguyên province
- Thai Nguyen (born 1980), fashion designer
