= Two Overtures Humbly Offered to His Grace John Duke of Argyll, Her Majesties High Commissioner, and the Right Honourable the Estates of Parliament =

Economics book

Two Overtures Humbly Offered to his Grace John Duke of Argyll, Her Majesties High Commissioner, and the right Honourable the Estates of Parliament
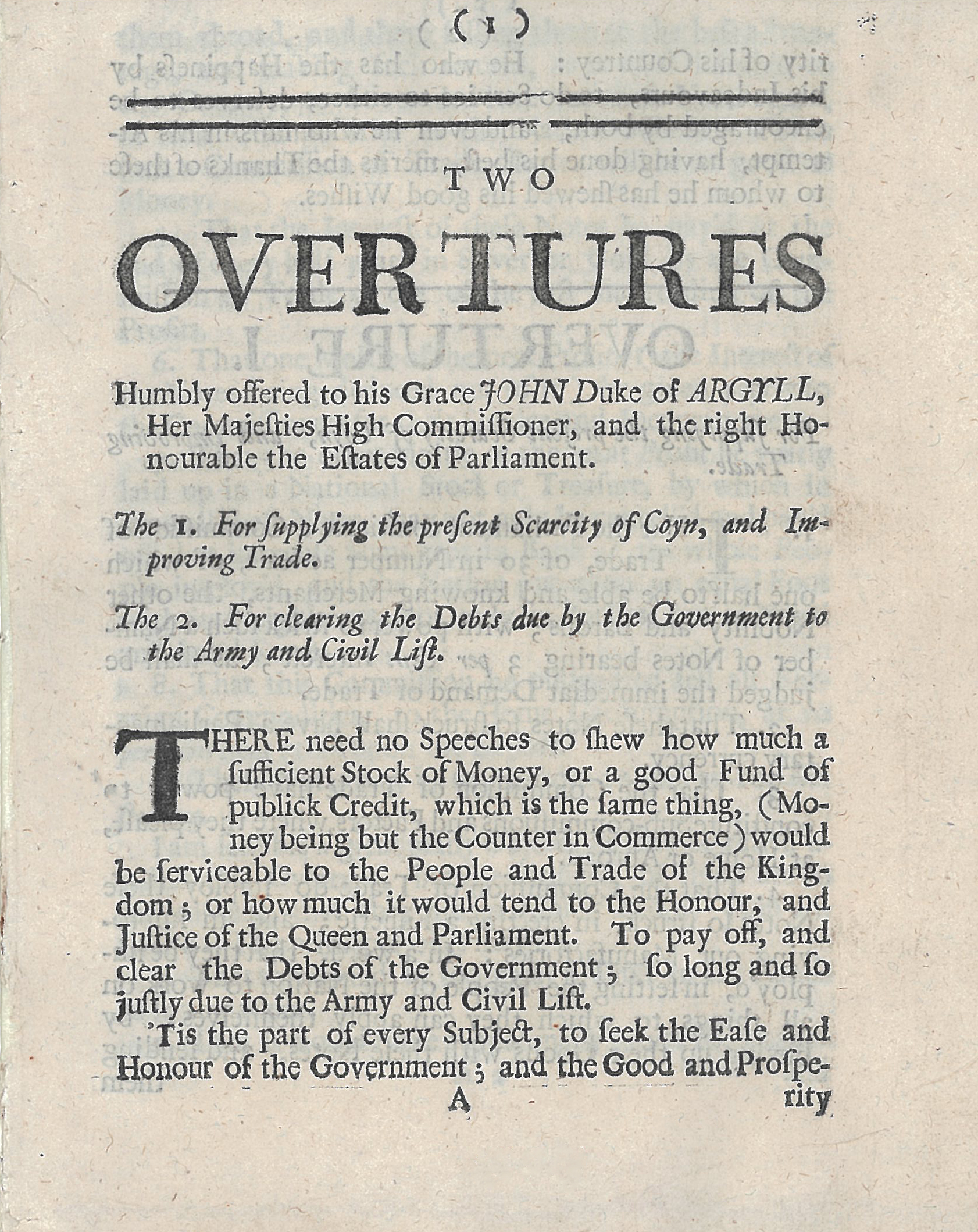
- Author: John Law
- Language: English
- Genre: Economics, Philosophy
- Publisher: Unknown
- Publication date: 1705
- Publication place: Edinburgh, Scotland

Two Overtures Humbly Offered to his Grace John Duke of Argyll, Her Majesties High Commissioner, and the right Honourable the Estates of Parliament is a pamphlet of economic proposals written by the early eighteenth-century economist John Law of Lauriston which was published in 1705.

== Background ==
Law wrote the pamphlet for consideration by the Parliament of Scotland. Its purpose was to propose ways in which Scotland could stimulate its economy by increasing the amount of available currency which would have the consequence of improving trade, and also by enabling the Scottish Government to pay off its national debt. Law addressed the pamphlet to The High Commissioner, His Grace John Duke of Argyll, who then represented Queen Anne in Scotland. Argyll was related to Law by his mother, also a Campbell, and Argyll, together with his brother Lord Islay, warmly supported the suggestions contained in it.

== Significance ==
The pamphlet is significant as it sets out Law's embryonic and revolutionary ideas for establishing new systems of finance, paper money and refinancing the national debt. Law would later expand on those ideas in his seminal work Money and Trade Considered: with a Proposal for Supplying the Nation with Money (1705). The pamphlet offered substantially the same system of finance which system was carried out in the Mississippi Scheme, fifteen years later. It was both considered and replied to by the Scottish trader and banker William Paterson, the founder of the Bank of England.

Despite the support of Argyll and Islay, Law's proposals contained in Two Overtures, and subsequently those contained in Money and Trade Considered, were ultimately rejected by the Scottish Parliament.

== Rarity ==
The pamphlet is extremely rare. Only seven copies of the original are known to have survived. Six are held in libraries and one in a private collection.
