= John Law (economist) =

Scottish-French economist and financier (1671–1729)

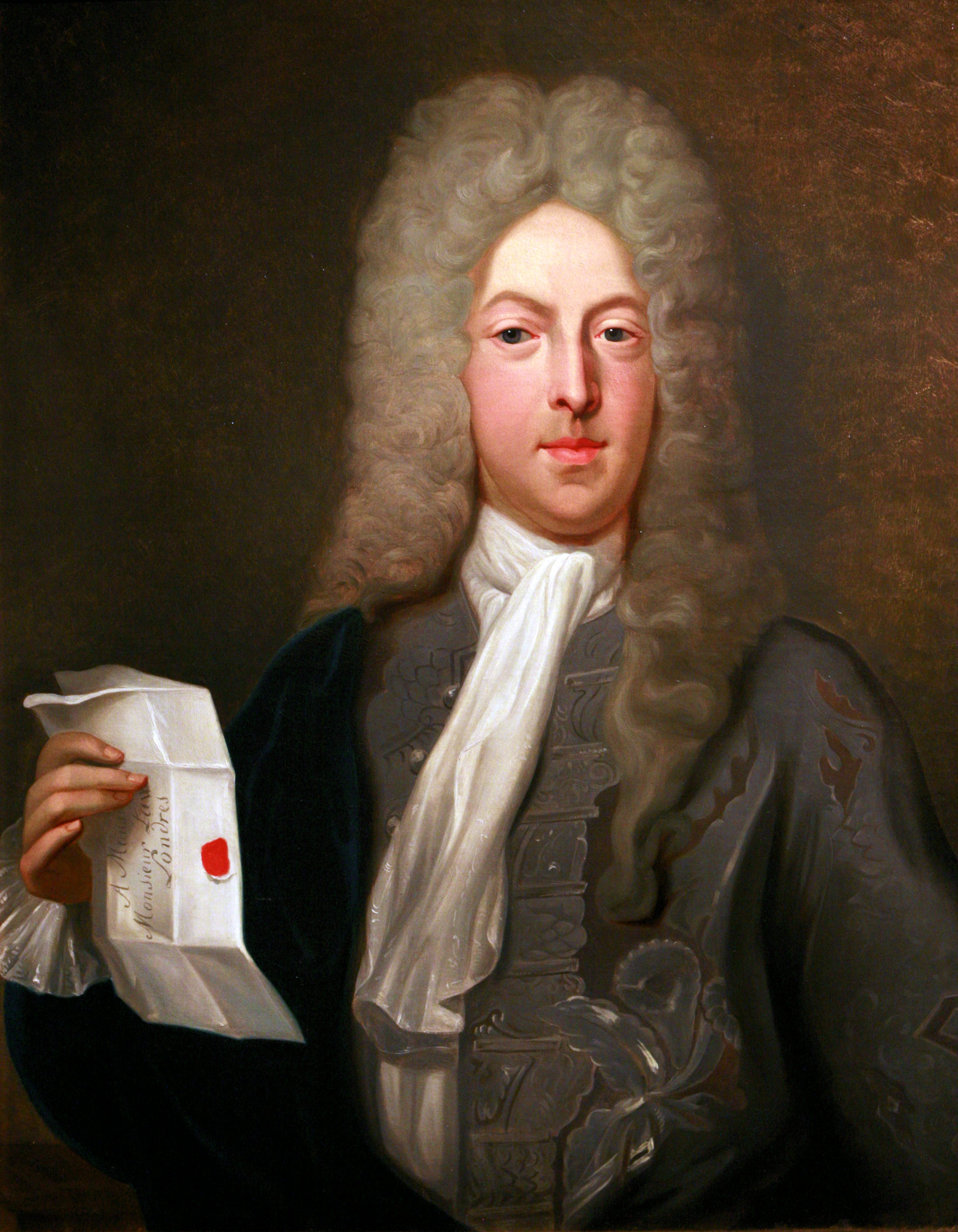
- John Law, by Casimir Balthazar
- Born: 21 April 1671; Edinburgh, Kingdom of Scotland
- Died: 21 March 1729 (aged 57); Venice, Republic of Venice
- Occupations: Economist, banker, financier, author, controller-general of finances
- Spouse: Lady Katherine Knollys
- Children: 2
- Relatives: Jean Law de Lauriston (Nephew); Jacques Lauriston (Grand nephew)

John Law (pronounced [lɑs] in French in the traditional approximation of Laws, the colloquial Scottish form of the name; 21 April 1671 – 21 March 1729) was a Scottish-French economist and financier. He rose to power in France where he created a novel financial scheme for French public finances known as Law's System (French: le système de Law) with two institutions at its core, John Law's Bank and John Law's Company (also known as the Mississippi company), ending in the devastating boom and bust "Mississippi Bubble" of 1720.

Born in Scotland, Law was an accomplished gambler with an interest in the rules of probability. After killing a man in a duel and being sentenced to death, he fled to mainland Europe. He read economics and made the acquaintance of Philippe II, Duke of Orléans, who became regent for the juvenile Louis XV in 1715. In 1716 Philippe approved Law's plan to create a private bank which would take gold deposits in return for bank notes, loaning out the gold. It was structured as a joint-stock company and was bought by the French government in 1718, becoming the Banque royale. In 1717 Law founded another joint-stock company, the Mississippi company, whose purpose was the economic exploitation of Louisiana as well as other French colonies. Law became Controller General of Finances in 1720 and was the richest man in Europe. He had to leave France that same year, as a stock boom turned into a bust. He then lived in various European cities and died in Venice, impoverished.

Whereas Law's System unquestionably ended in failure as a monetary framework, it had lasting influence as an early experiment in fiat money. Its soundness remains debated, with some analysts maintaining that it was not fundamentally flawed. Whereas the Mississippi company ended in bankruptcy, whether the collapse of Law's System represented an episode of sovereign default is ambiguous, given that France's debt situation was largely unchanged.

== Early years ==
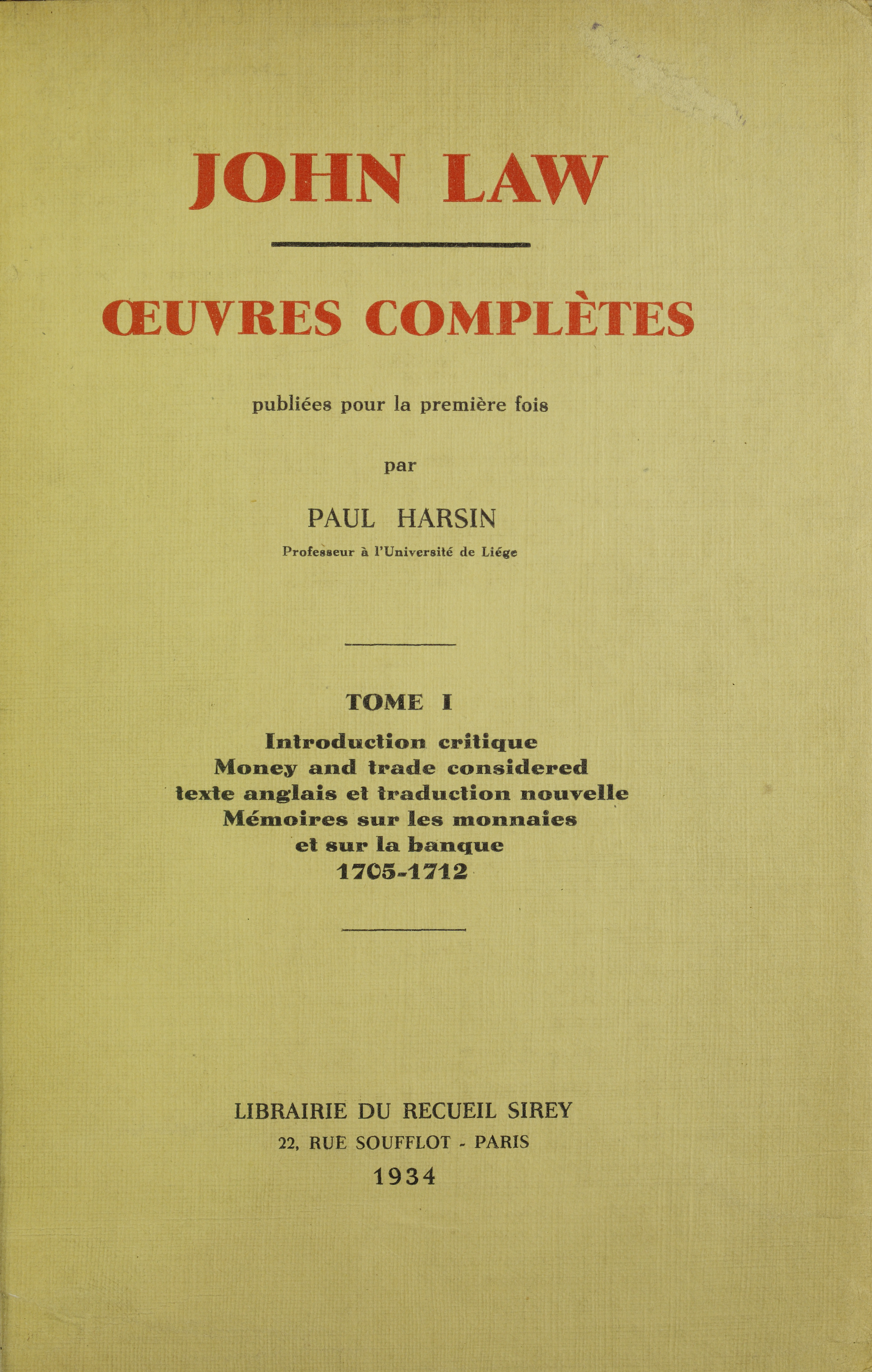
Money and trade considered, with a proposal for supplying the Nation with money, 1934 French translation of 1712 English edition

Law was born into a family of Lowland Scots bankers and goldsmiths from Fife; his father, William, had purchased Lauriston Castle, a landed estate at Cramond on the Firth of Forth and was known as Law of Lauriston. On leaving the High School of Edinburgh, Law joined the family business at the age of 14 and studied the banking business until his father died in 1688. He subsequently neglected the firm in favour of extravagant pursuits and travelled to London, where he lost large sums by gambling.

On 9 April 1694, John Law fought a duel with another British dandy, Edward "Beau" Wilson, in Bloomsbury Square, London. Wilson had challenged Law over the affections of Elizabeth Villiers. Law killed Wilson with a single pass and thrust of his sword. He was arrested and charged with murder and stood trial at the Old Bailey. He appeared before the infamously sadistic "hanging judge" Salathiel Lovell and was found guilty of murder and sentenced to death. He was initially incarcerated in Newgate Prison to await execution. His sentence was later commuted to a fine, on the grounds that the killing only amounted to manslaughter. Wilson's brother appealed and had Law imprisoned, but he managed to escape to Amsterdam.

== Economic theoretician ==
Law urged the establishment of a national bank to create and increase instruments of credit and the issue of banknotes backed by land, gold, or silver. The first manifestation of Law's System came when he had returned to Scotland and contributed to the debates leading to the Treaty of Union 1707. He wrote a pamphlet entitled Two Overtures Humbly Offered to His Grace John Duke of Argyll, Her Majesties High Commissioner, and the Right Honourable the Estates of Parliament (1705) which foreshadowed the ideas he would propose for establishing new systems of finance, paper money and refinancing the national debt in a subsequent tract entitled Money and Trade Considered: with a Proposal for Supplying the Nation with Money (1705). Law's propositions of creating a national bank in Scotland were ultimately rejected, and he left to pursue his ambitions abroad.

By 1710, Law had married Lady Katherine Knollys (1671-1747), daughter of Nicholas Knollys, 3rd Earl of Banbury (1630-1674). They had a daughter, Mary Katherine Law (1711-1790), who went on to marry her cousin, William Knollys (1694-1740) Banbury MP). His father was the 4th Earl of Banbury.

Law spent ten years moving between France and the Netherlands, dealing in financial speculations. He had the idea of abolishing minor monopolies and private farming of taxes. He would create a bank for national finance and a state company for commerce, ultimately to exclude all private revenue. This would create a huge monopoly of finance and trade run by the state, and its profits would pay off the national debt.

== Law's System ==
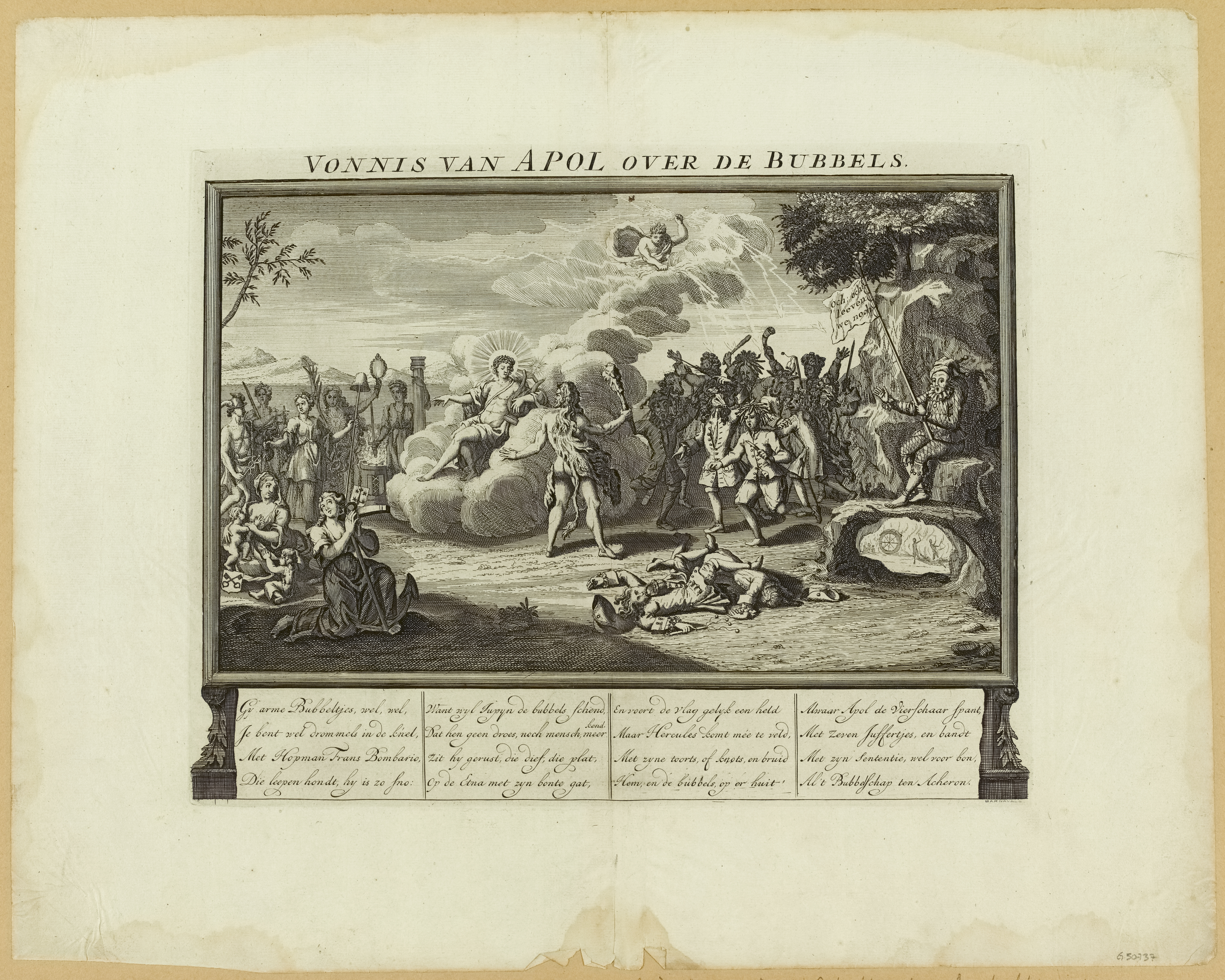
Judgment of Apollo over the Bubbles, satirical Dutch pamphlet published in 1720 about that year’s near-simultaneous speculative bubbles in Paris, London, Amsterdam and other European financial centers

John Law's system, first endorsed by the Regent Philippe d'Orléans in May 1716 and developed from then in increasing ambitious stages until 1720, rested on the expansion of monetary supply through the creation of fiat money and a complete overhaul of the French state's revenue collection, coinage and borrowing, all of which were centralized in Law's Company. Along the way, Law's Company absorbed all French colonial trading companies which had developed in fits and starts over the previous century, and started an unprecedented colonization of its own in Louisiana with the foundation of New Orleans in 1718. It was renamed the Compagnie des Indes (Indies Company) in 1719, and in February 1720 absorbed the bank that Law had initially established in May 1716.

Law's social standing rose with his financial heft. On 17 September 1719, he converted to Catholicism in the low-profile convent of the Recollects in Melun. On 2 December 1719, he was elected an honorary member of the Royal Academy of Sciences. The Regent then appointed Law as Controller-General of Finances on 5 January 1720, effectively giving him control over external and internal commerce. As Controller-General, Law instituted many reforms, some of which had lasting effects, while others were soon abolished. He tried to break up large land-holdings to benefit the peasants; he abolished internal road and canal tolls; he encouraged the building of new roads, the starting of new industries (even importing artisans but mostly by offering low-interest loans), and the revival of overseas commerce — and indeed industry increased by 60 per cent in two years, and the number of French ships engaged in export went from 16 to 300.

The system started to unravel in 1720 as price inflation started to surge. Law sought to hold the Indies Company's share price at 9,000 livres in March 1720, and then on 21 May 1720 to engineer a controlled reduction in the value of both notes and the shares, a measure that was itself reversed six days later. As the public rushed to convert banknotes to coin, Law was forced to close the Banque Générale for ten days, then limit the transaction size once the bank reopened. On 29 May 1720, Law was dismissed as Comptroller-General of Finances. The queues grew longer, the Indies Company's stock price continued to fall, and food prices soared by as much as 60 per cent. At the end of 1720, the Regent eventually dismissed Law as Controller General and as head of the Indies Company.

== Properties and titles ==
When arriving in Paris in 1714 Law made his home in Place Louis-le-Grand, now place Vendôme, in the Hôtel de Gramont where he hosted and entertained various Parisian nobles. On 30 June 1718 he purchased the Hôtel Langlée on 19 rue Neuve-des-Petits-Champs, now 46-54 rue des Petits-Champs in Paris, and moved there after due renovations. In July 1718, he started buying lots with entrances on the Place Vendôme, and ended up owning most of that square before his downfall. The Hôtel Langlée was later demolished, and the lots on Place Vendôme sold by the French state in the restructuring following Law's flight from the country.

Law also acquired a number of suburban estates and properties in Normandy and farther away from Paris, amassing a significant land and real estate portfolio. On 30 April 1718, he purchased the Château de la Marche from Nicolas Desmarets. On 30 June 1718, the same day as his acquisition of the Parisian Hôtel Langlée, he bought the Château de Tancarville from Louis Henri de La Tour d'Auvergne, comte d'Évreux. Law then acquired the estates of Toucy, Valençay and Roissy in the second half of 1719, and Orcher, Effiat, Guermantes and Yville in the course of 1720.

On 10 May 1719 Law purchased the western part of the former Palais Mazarin known as the Hôtel de Nevers. In September 1719, he negotiated with Paul Jules de La Porte to purchase the rest of the Palais Mazarin, and bought six houses bordering rue Vivienne on the western side, then went on to acquire the entire city block including the Hôtel Tubeuf. In 1720, Law relocated the Indies Company there. In late October of that year, the site also became the official location for the Paris stock exchange, following the closure of the market's previous incarnation at rue Quincampoix on 22 March 1720 (even though unregulated trading lingered there) and subsequent short-lived venues on place Vendôme and in the garden of the Hôtel de Soissons. Law commissioned Venetian painter Giovanni Antonio Pellegrini to redecorate the first-floor gallery of the Hôtel de Nevers for the purpose of hosting the company's shareholders meetings. After Law's downfall, the restructured French Indies Company remained in the Hôtel Tubeuf and the stock market in that building's rear garden bordering rue Vivienne, while the Hôtel de Nevers was granted in 1725 to the Royal Library which later became the Bibliothèque nationale de France (now its Site Richelieu).

Some of the acquisitions gave Law the right to use nobility titles, such as Marquess of Toucy. Law appears not to have taken advantage of that option, however, except in isolated cases of notarized documents that refer to him as Count of Tancarville. He has been occasionally said to have claimed or aimed at the title of "Duke of Arkansas" for his company's endeavors in the Mississippi valley, but this assertion, generally made in the United States, has no documentary basis.

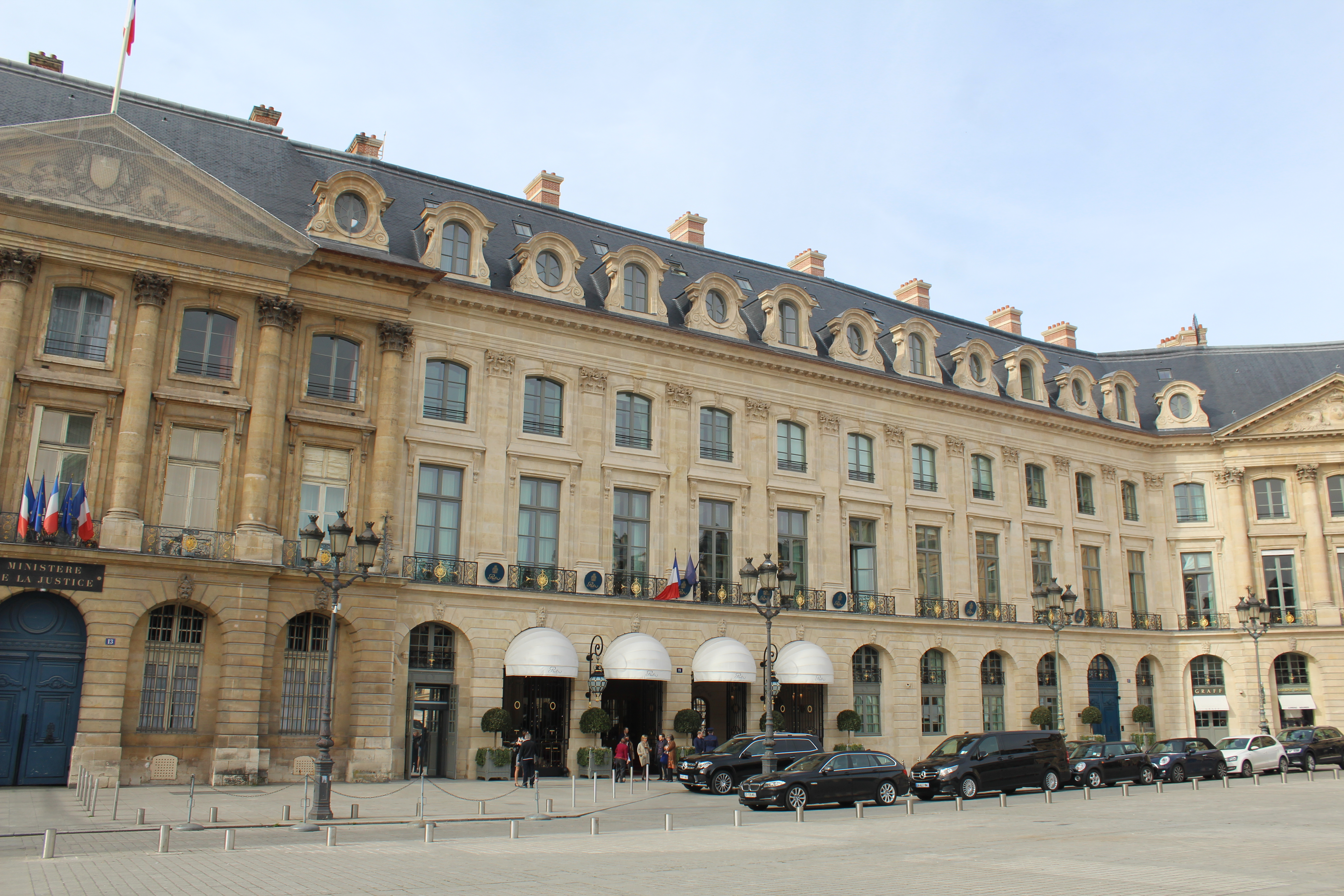
John Law's rented home from 1714 to 1718 on Place Vendôme, now Hôtel Ritz Paris

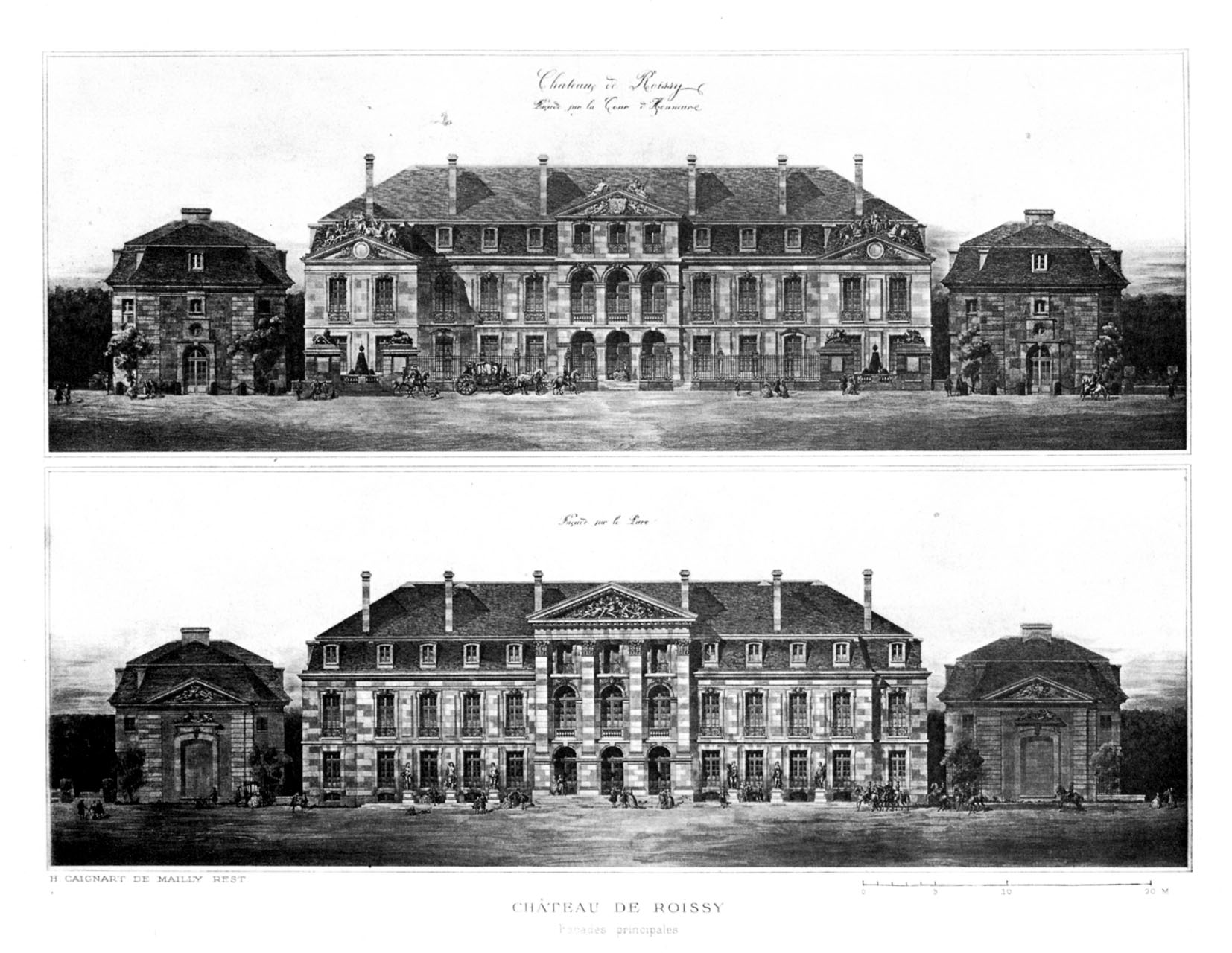
Château de Roissy, demolished in 1794

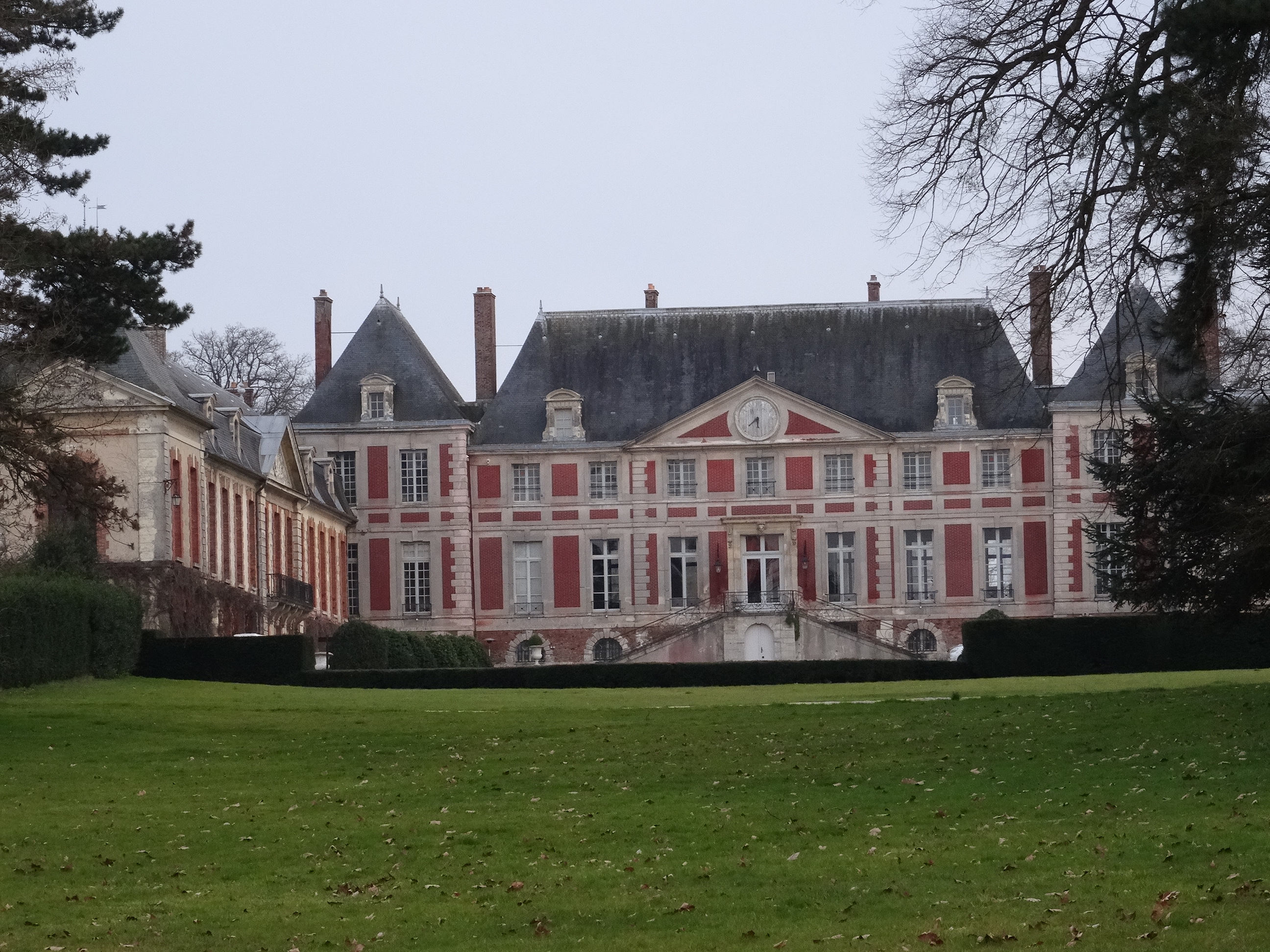
Château de Guermantes

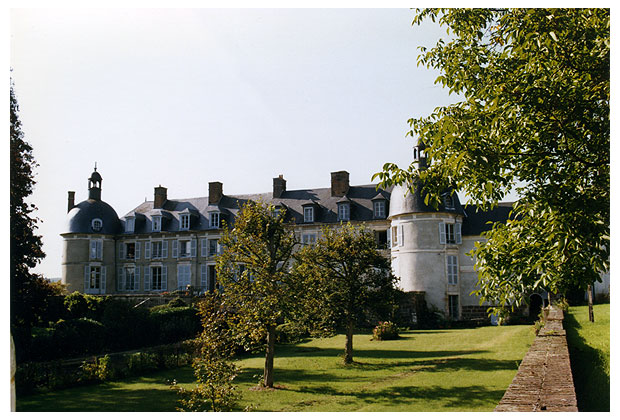
Château de Toucy

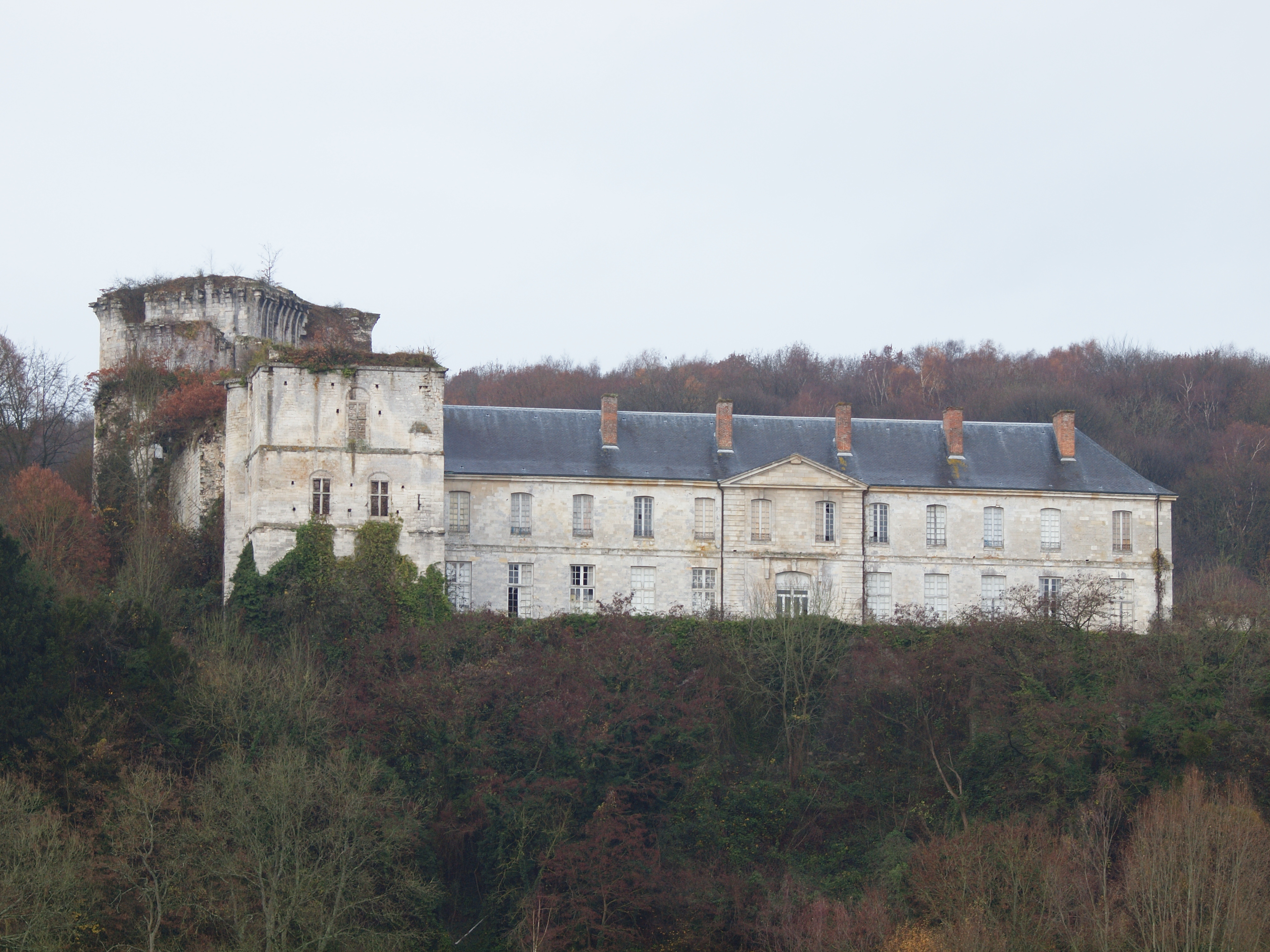
Château de Tancarville

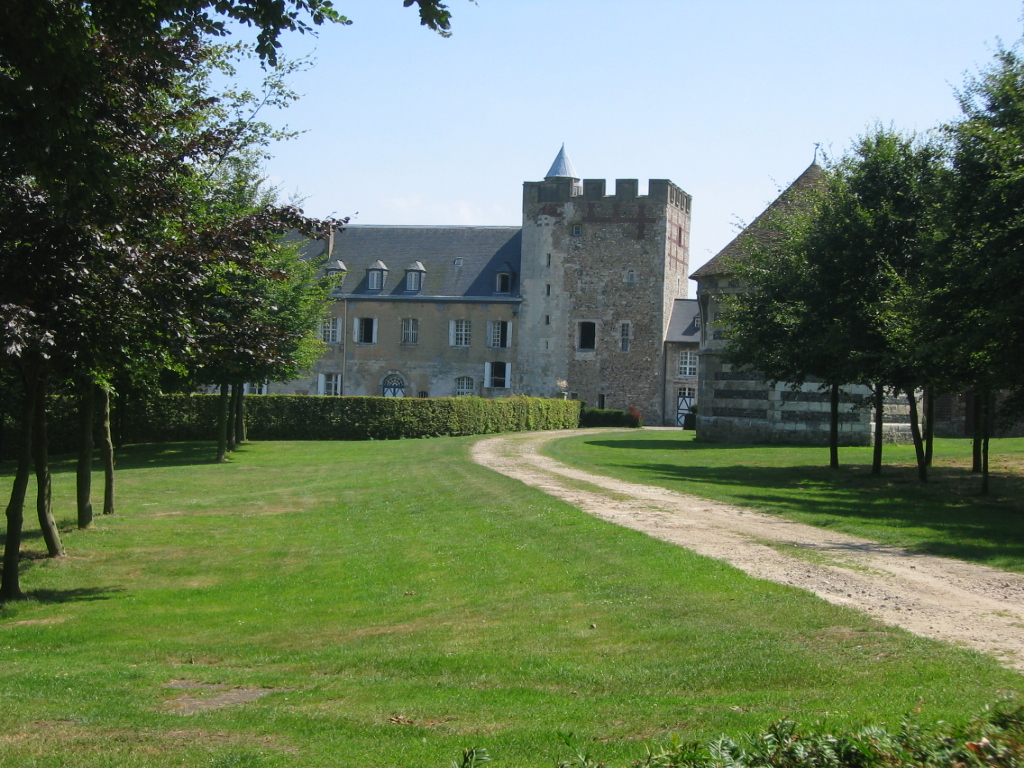
Château d'Orcher

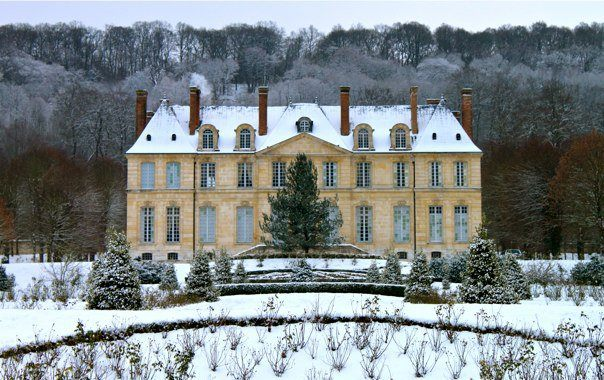
Château d'Yville

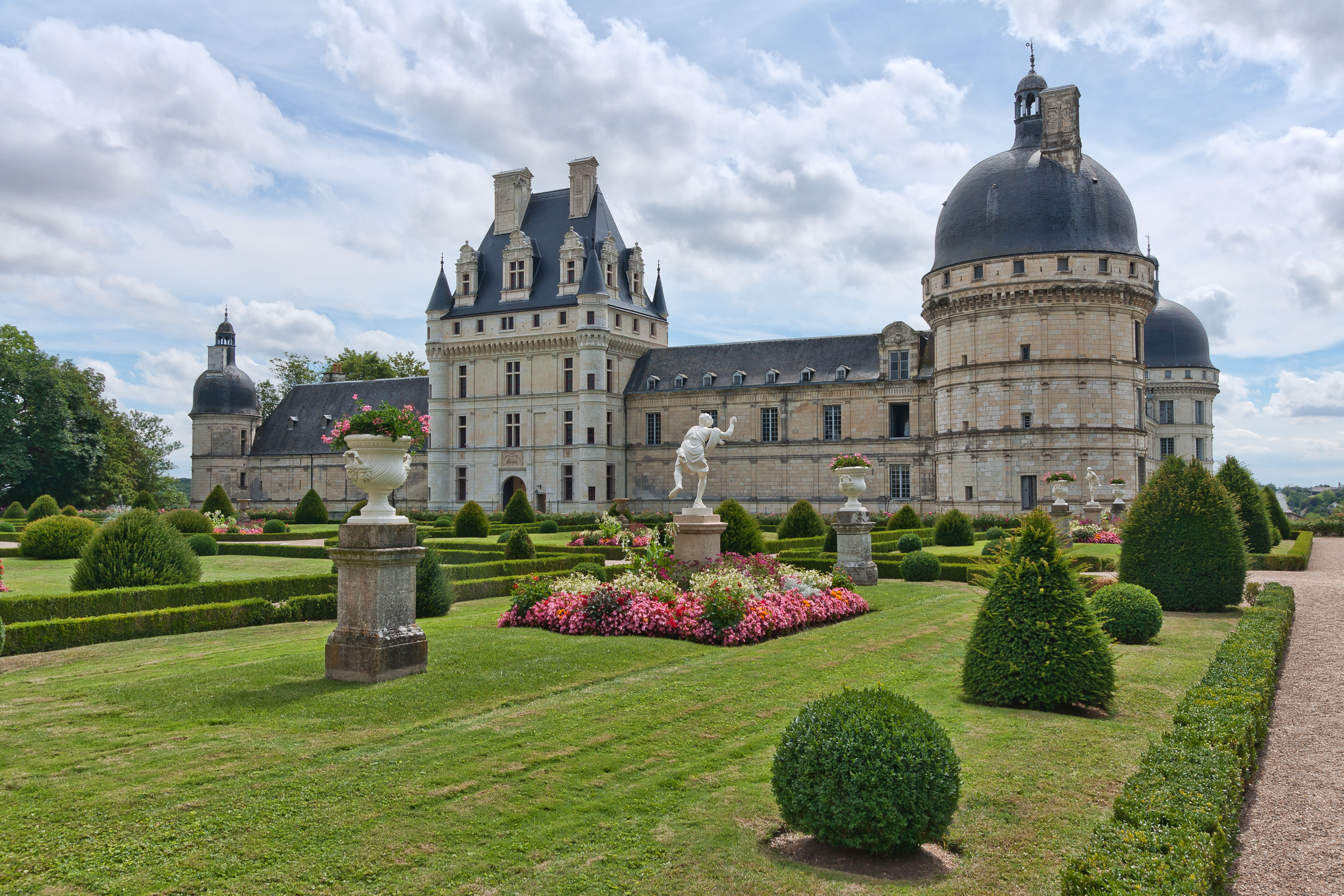
Château de Valençay

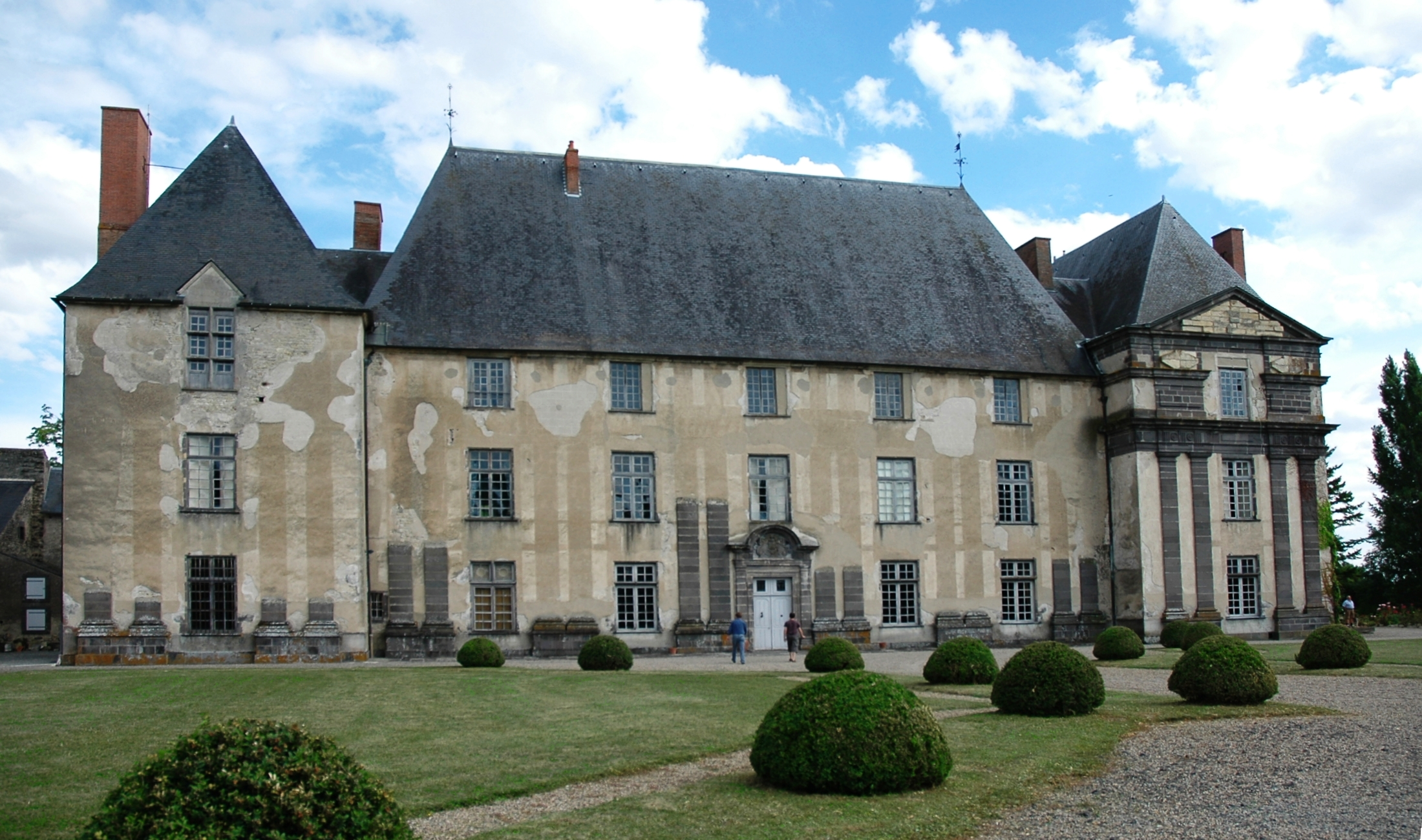
Château d'Effiat

== Later years and death ==
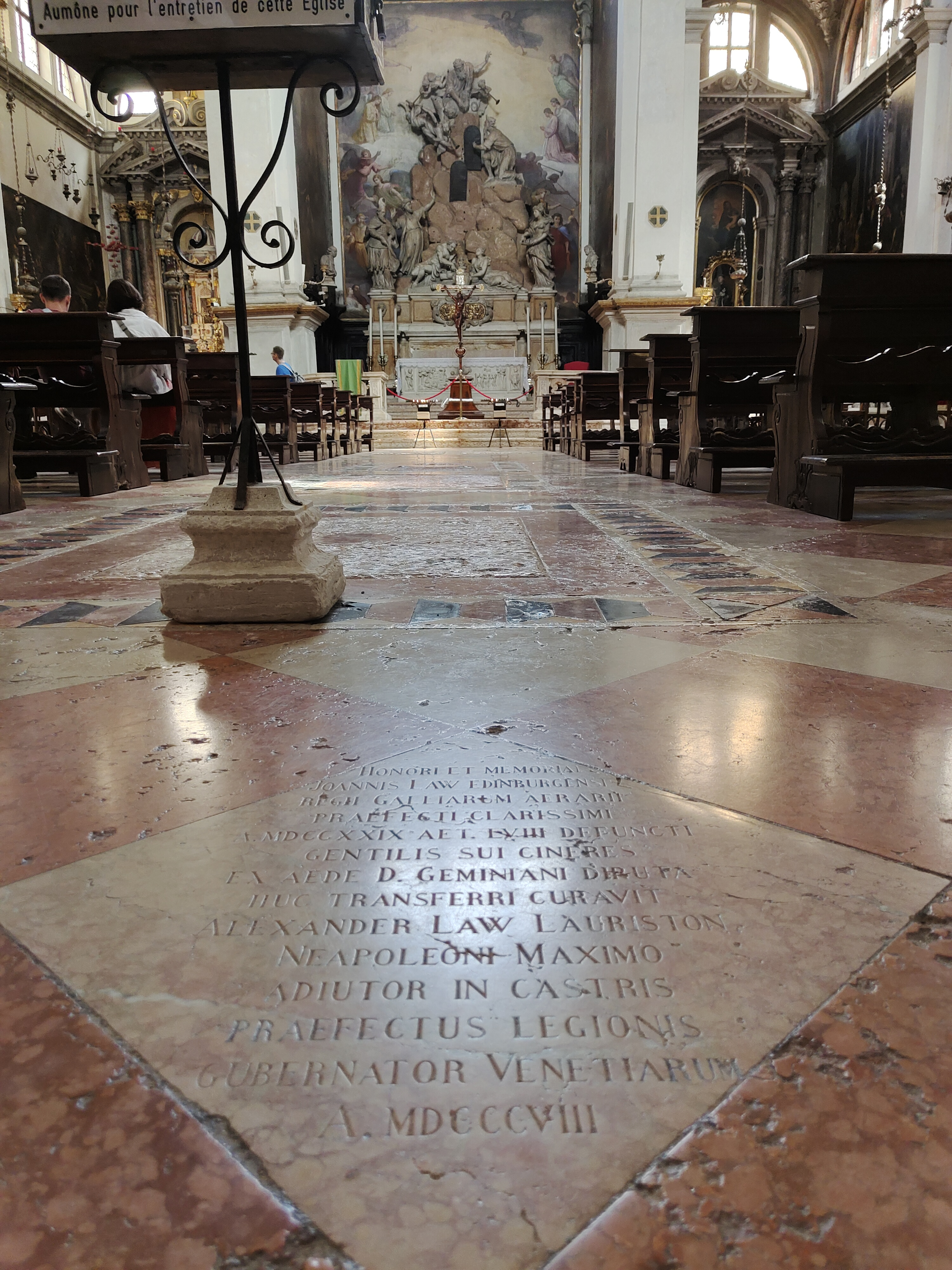
Gravestone of John Law and Alexander Law in the church of San Moisè, Venice

Law moved to Brussels on 22 December 1720 in impoverished circumstances when his properties in France were voluntarily confiscated. He spent the next few years gambling in Rome, Copenhagen and Venice but never regained his former prosperity. Law realised he would never return to France when Orléans died suddenly in 1723 and Law was granted permission to return to London, having been pardoned in 1719. He lived in London for four years and then moved to Venice, where he contracted pneumonia and died poor in 1729. His gravestone is in the San Moisè, Venice.

== Legacy and assessment ==
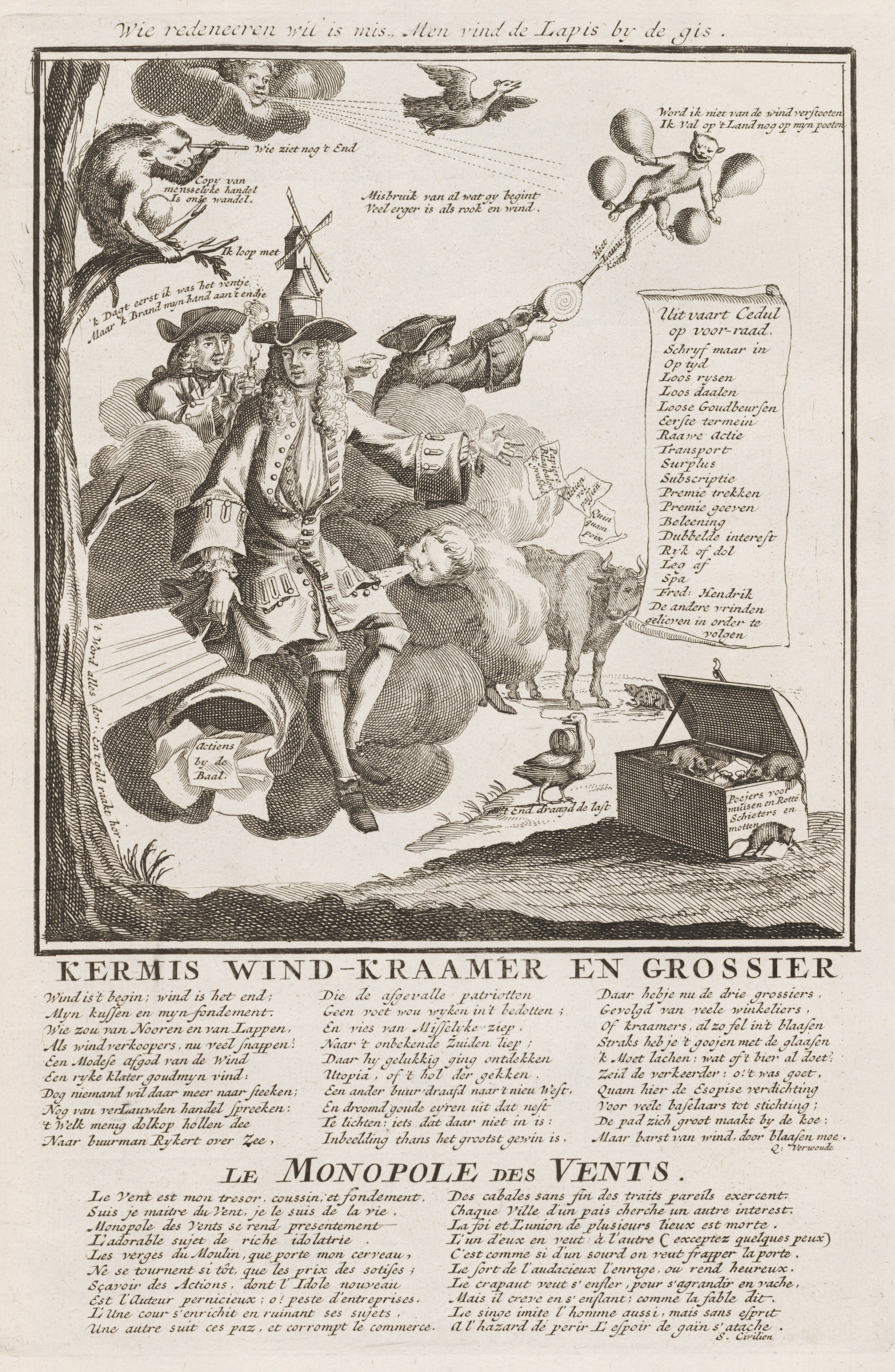
Political cartoon from Het Groote Tafereel der Dwaasheid (1720). Excerpt from the poem at bottom: "The wind is my treasure, cushion, and foundation. Master of the wind, I am master of life, and my wind monopoly becomes straightway the object of idolatry"

Law had lasting influence as a monetary theorist. He held that money creation stimulated an economy, paper money was preferable to metal, and dividend-paying shares a superior form of money. He propounded ideas such as the scarcity theory of value and the real bills doctrine.

The chaotic collapse of Law's System has been compared to the 17th-century tulip mania parable in Holland. The Mississippi bubble coincided with the South Sea bubble in England, which allegedly took ideas from it.

Henry Thornton explained why Law's scheme failed: "He forgot that there might be no bounds to the demand for paper; that the increasing quantity would contribute to the rise of commodities: and the price of commodities require, and seem to justify, a still further increase."

Law's nephew, Jean Law de Lauriston, was later Governor-General of Pondicherry.

The term "millionaire" was coined for beneficiaries of Law's scheme.

While most of Law's system was directed at domestic financial reform, its overseas impact was also notable, including the founding of New Orleans on behalf of the Compagnie d'Occident in 1718. More broadly, it has been assessed that "Law's was the most determined French colonial enterprise until the capture of Algiers in 1830".

== Cultural references ==
Sharon Condie and Richard Condie's 1978 National Film Board of Canada (NFB) animated short John Law and the Mississippi Bubble is a humorous interpretation. The film was produced by the NFB at its newly opened Winnipeg studio. It opened in Canadian cinemas starting in September 1979 and was sold to international broadcasters. The film received an award at the Tampere Film Festival.

In 1864 William Harrison Ainsworth published the novel John Law based on his career.

John Law is referenced in Voltaire's 'Dictionnaire Philosophique', as part of the entry on reason.

John Law is the subject of the section entitled "Fragment d'un ancien mythologiste" in "Lettre CXLII" of Montesquieu's epistolary novel "Lettres Persanes" published in 1721.

John Law is the focus of Rafael Sabatini's 1949 novel The Gamester.

The 2003 novel The Cryptographer by Tobias Hill contains an eponymous major character and plot referencing his life. So does the 2006 novel Das Grosse Spiel (The great gambler, 2014) by Claude Cueni.

== See also ==
- Johan Palmstruch
- William Paterson (banker)
- Assignat, bank note system during the French Revolution
