= Money and Trade Considered =

Economics book

- Author: John Law
- Language: English
- Genre: Economics, Philosophy
- Publisher: The Heirs and Successors of Andrew Anderson
- Publication date: 1705
- Publication place: Edinburgh, Scotland

Money and Trade Considered: With a Proposal for Supplying the Nation with Money is an early economics text written by John Law of Lauriston, published in 1705. In it, he attempts to compare the prosperity of other countries with that of Scotland, and advocates a "land bank" system of paper money backed by real estate as a commodity, instead of gold or silver.

== The Book ==
In this book, which was published in 1705, Law proposes the creation of a new paper currency in Scotland based on land values as an alternative to the prevailing use of silver coinage at the time. He did so in the context of an acute shortage of such silver currency in Scotland in the aftermath of the 1690s famine followed by the disastrous Darian scheme which reached its nadir in about 1699 and in which the Scottish nation is estimated to have lost in the range of 15-40% of its capital. Having failed to convince his compatriots, Law travelled to France where he had a much more favourable reception, setting up the Banque Royale, promoting the Mississippi Company and inflating a massive monetary bubble which in due course popped. In 1707 the Scottish nation solved its capital deficit when as one of the conditions of its union with England it received the sum of £398,085 which was equivalent to the amount lost in the Darian scheme.

John Law examines what he finds to be problems with monetary theory in Scotland. This topic had been growing in attractiveness for the previous 150 years, as Europe had suffered an increasing crisis known as the price revolution, where the value of gold had been fluctuating wildly, and falling overall, in large part because of the influx of additional silver plundered from the New World.

Law describes the scarcity of money as being essential for its value, a lesson learned by that crisis of the previous two centuries.

He describes the evolution of money this way:

He who had more goods than he had use for, would choose to barter them for silver, tho' he had no use for it; because, silver was certain in its quality: It was easy of delivery: it could be kept without loss or expense, and with it he could purchase other goods as he had occasion, in whole or part, at home or abroad, silver being divisible without loss, and of the same value in different places.

Because silver, the common money in Scotland at the time, is falling in value, he proposes land, whose value is more stable, as a replacement backing for currency.

Regarding the Price Revolution, Law says:

The Spainiards bring as great Quantities into Europe as they can get wrought out of the Mines

Thus, he says, the value of metal currency has been diluted.

Remarkable in his work is the assertion that money is not something invented by government authority, which was the popular view of government authorities at the time. But he cedes, as was probably legally required of him, that government (the King) owns all money, as he owns all roads and land. He also points out that money is not actually traded for its own value, but as a tool for obtaining goods themselves.

== Impact ==
Gavin John Adams described the impact and legacy of Money and Trade Considered as follows:

Money and Trade Considered, With a Proposal for Supplying the Nation with Money was so much more than a mere proposal for a note-issuing bank. It was a staggeringly original work of genius which not only included proposals for new systems of banking, and the issuing of paper money as a means to stimulate the economy, but also revealed, for the first time, several of the most significant economic concepts ever devised; concepts which would later be espoused by economists such as Adam Smith and John Maynard Keynes without acknowledgement. It was meant for the consideration of the Scottish Parliament, but the ideas it contained fundamentally altered economics, politics, finance, and, consequently, the modern world. John Law’s Money and Trade Considered is the most influential but least acknowledged work in the history of economics.

The book failed to convince the Scottish government to implement a paper money system, but "contained the germ ... of the System" which Law subsequent progressed in France. Unfortunately, this system was flawed, suffering first extreme speculation and then rampant inflation, until failing some years later. Thornton explained why Law's scheme failed: "He forgot that there might be no bounds to the demand for paper; that the increasing quantity would contribute to the rise of commodities: and the price of commodities require, and seem to justify, a still further increase."

Friedrich Hayek saw "great perspicacity" in three aspects of Law's work: (1) the substantial qualities of a money, (2) commodity value, "anticipating many elements of the modern theory of subjective value", and (3) a historical account of money and its supply. In summary, Hayek suggested that "The individual components of Law's proposal were nothing new... But these ideas had never been presented with equal brilliance and persuasiveness."
