= Morison & Co. =

Morison & Co. were cabinet-makers and upholsterers established by Mathew Morison in Ayr, Scotland c.1808. It ceased to exist as a separate entity in 1902 when the business was sold to W. Turner Lord & Co. of London, who continued to use it as a trading name.

== History ==
James Morison took over the business from his father. By the time of his death, 2 June 1862, the cabinet maker was based in Edinburgh and trading as Morison & Co. William Reid worked for the company and took over the business on James' death.

William Reid's eldest son William Robert Reid (1854–1919), was made partner in the business in 1884 as his father had become blind. William Reid senior died in 1895 leaving the business to W. R. Reid and his brother John Reid. The company expanded to become one of the leading cabinet makers in Scotland, and branches were opened in Glasgow and Manchester. W. R. Reid ran the company until he sold it in 1902, at the same time that he bought Lauriston Castle in Edinburgh.

The company was purchased by W. Turner Lord & Co. of London who continued to use the Morison & Co. name for some time. W. Turner Lord & Co. received an order to fit out most of the first-class accommodation of the Mauretania.

'The company was one of the first to undertake architectural restoration as part of everyday business and the first in Scotland to construct the interiors of trains-de-luxe, for which it became renowned' (City of Edinburgh Council, 1999).

Examples of Morison & Co. furniture can be seen at Lauriston Castle, and at Sambourne House in London.
