= Johan Palmstruch =

17th-century Latvian-Dutch entrepreneur and financier

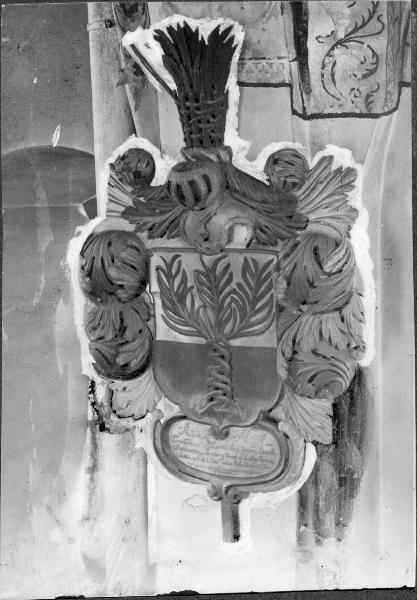
Arms of Johan Palmstruch, Täby Church, 1671

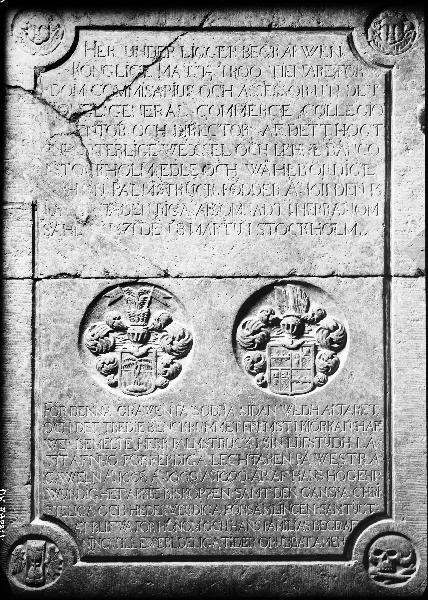
Tombstone of Johan Palmstruch, Täby Church, 1671

Johan Palmstruch born Wittmacher (June 13, 1611 – March 8, 1671) was a Swedish-born entrepreneur, financier, and financial innovator. He is credited with the introduction of paper money to Europe.

== Biography ==
Johan (Hans) Wittmacher was born in Riga (then in Livonia) where his father Reinholt was a merchant and his mother Anna Bielska. His ancestors probably came from the county of Holstein. Around 1634, he moved to Amsterdam. Johan married Margrieta van der Bosch (1617-1677) in February 1644. In the same year a daughter was baptized in Oude Kerk, Amsterdam.

He became a commissioner in the National Board of Trade after his arrival in Sweden in 1647. He began submitting proposals for banking institutions to King Charles X Gustav after 1654. The first two such proposals were rejected but the third, which promised half the bank's profits to the crown, was accepted. He was made a Swedish nobleman in 1651 and he took the surname Palmstruch and become a commissioner at the National College of Commerce.

Stockholms Banco was thus founded in Stockholm during 1657 with Palmstruch appointed as bank director and general manager. The bank itself was nothing new as it was simply an imitation of the successful public deposit banks of Amsterdam and Hamburg, however Palmstruch himself added two important innovations.

The first of these was to use money deposited into accounts at the bank to finance loans, however this soon became a problem as the deposits were usually short-term and the loans long-term, meaning that deposited money was unavailable to be withdrawn by account holders.

Palmstruch's second innovation, and his solution to this problem, was the introduction in 1661 of credit paper (Kreditivsedlar), the first European banknotes, which would be exchangeable at any time for the gold and silver coins they were replacing. These were very successful, but the bank began lending more than it could afford and printed too many banknotes without the necessary collateral, leading to the bank's collapse in 1668. This led to the founding of the Sveriges Riksbank.

Palmstruch was charged with irresponsible book-keeping and with not having the cash to repay these credit notes due to miscalculation and omissions in his book-keeping. He was unable to make up this shortage and in 1668 was sentenced to loss of his title, loss of his banking privilege, and eternal exile or death. The government reprieved the death penalty and Palmstruch was instead imprisoned. He remained in prison until 1670 and died the following year at the age of 60.
