= Château d'Orcher =

Castle in Gonfreville-l'Orcher, France

Coordinates: 49°29′49″N 0°14′47″E

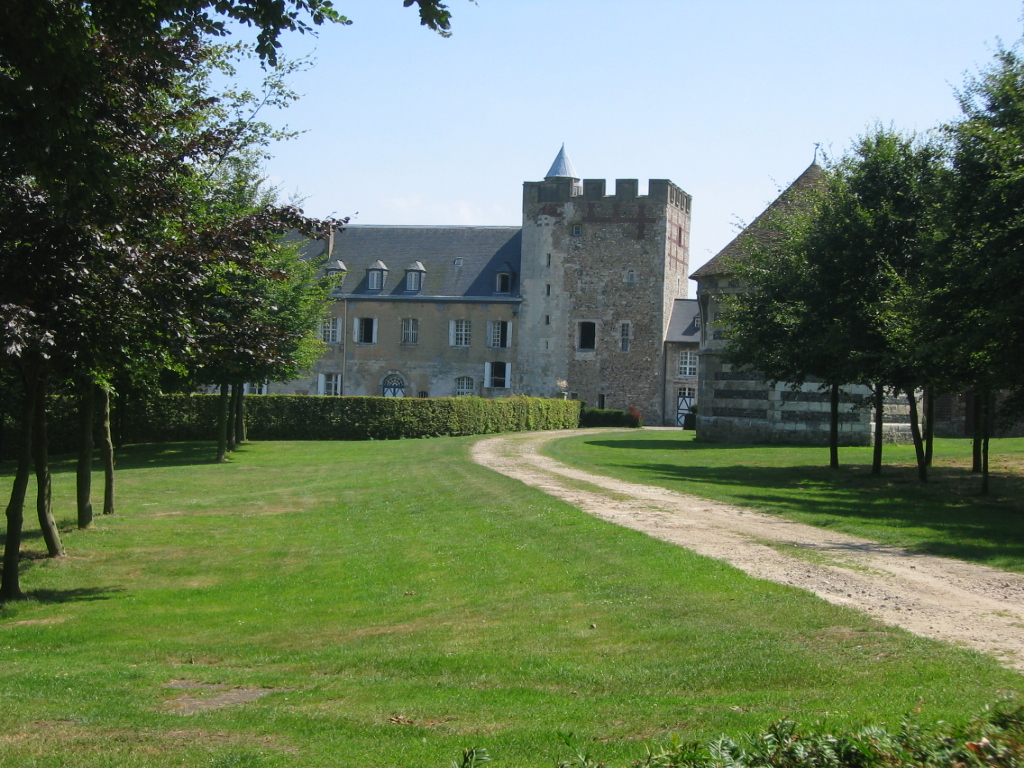
Château d'Orcher

The Château d'Orcher is a castle in the commune of Gonfreville-l'Orcher in the Seine-Maritime département of France.

Built to protect the mouth of the River Seine, it includes an imposing square crenellated tower. In the 18th century it was transformed into a residence.

== History ==
The Auricher fiefdom was created by the Duke of Normandy for a family who got the name Aurichier from a place down in the Seine Valley and built the castle with a chapel (Sainte-Honorine) on top of a cliff overlooking the Seine. The square keep was surrounded by a trapezoidal enceinte, defended in the 13th century by three square towers. In 1360 it was partly destroyed on the orders of officials from Harfleur. Rebuilt later, it was taken by the English in 1415 at the same time as Harfleur.

The Crespin family was dispossessed by Henry V. Some French sources state that Henry gave the castle to John Falstaff, the fictional Shakespearean character, but this is almost certainly meant to be Sir John Fastolf. In 1434, the castle and its associated possessions and privileges were given to the Duke of Bedford. In 1449, the estates reverted to the Crespins and later, by legacy, went to the Brézé family in 1488 and finally to the O family in 1539. In 1604, the Orcher land was decreed to be the property of Georges Laillet seigneur of Auricher, and consisted of castle, fortress and house covered with slate. In 1632 the estates became the property of the Potier family.

Thomas Planterose took possession in 1735 and over the next ten years set about transforming the castle. He employed master masons François de la Motte and Jacques Lesueur, both from Picardy, and a master plasterer from Caudebec-en-Caux, Courtel]. The elegant woodwork was created by a carpenter from Le Havre, Le Roux. The two north towers and the ruins of the great keep in the north-west were demolished, along with the curtain walls.

In 1795, following the division of the estate with the death of Madame de Melmont, the property was described as a "dwelling house castle and accessories and a farm of 145 acres". In the 19th century, the estate became the property of the Rochechouart family, who had the castle, notably the tower, restored in 1857 by the architect P. Philippon.

The castle grounds are open to the public all year. The Château d'Orcher is listed as a monument historique by the French Ministry of Culture.

== See also ==
- List of castles in France
