= Stockholms Banco =

Historic bank in Sweden (1661–67)

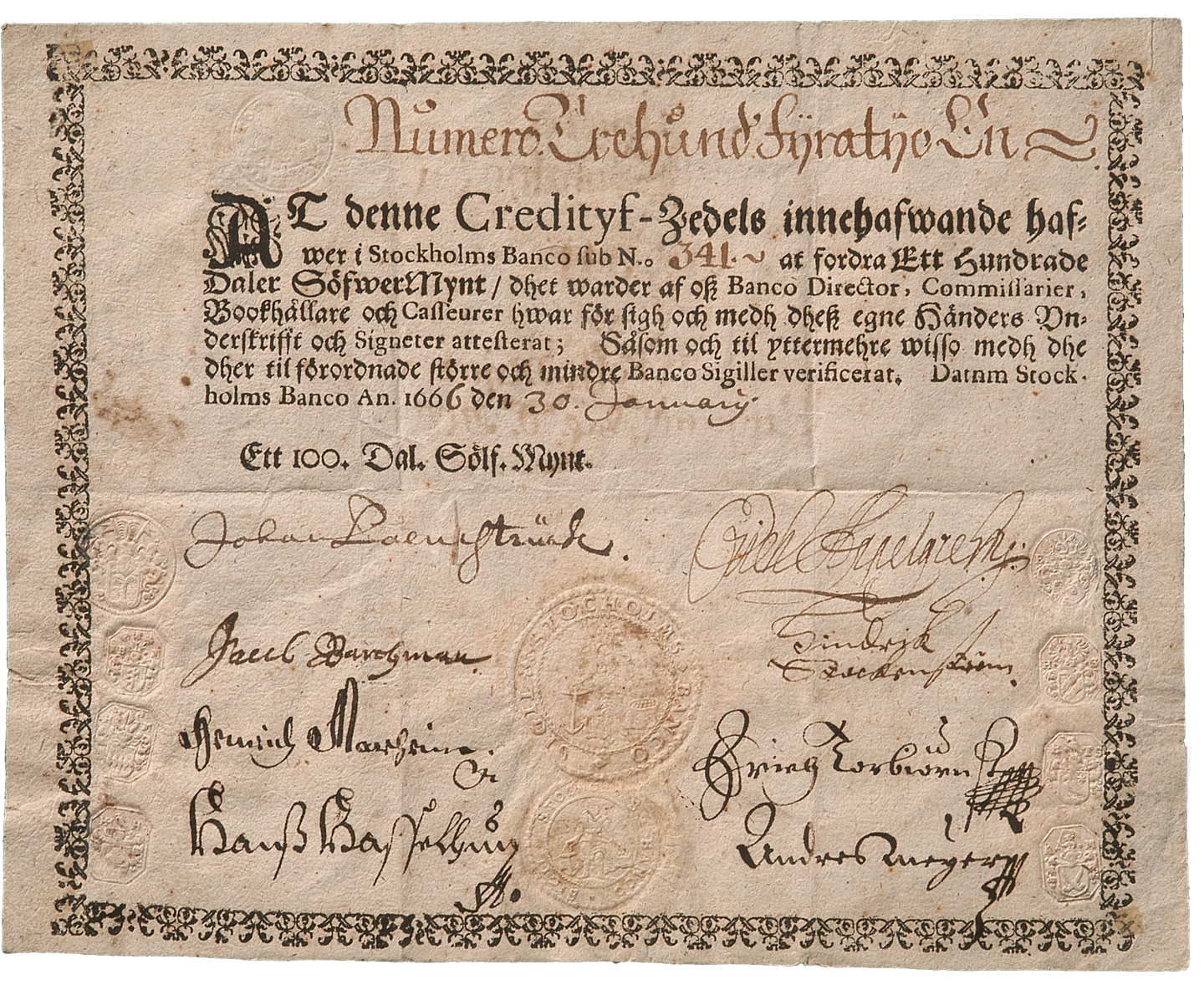
Banknote of one hundred daler issued by Stockholms Banco and signed by Johan Palmstruch, 1666

Stockholms Banco (also known as the Palmstruch's Bank, Swedish: Palmstruchska banken) was the first European bank to print banknotes. It was founded in 1657 by Johan Palmstruch in Stockholm, began printing banknotes in 1661, but ran into financial difficulties and was liquidated in 1667. Stockholms Banco was the immediate precursor to the central bank of Sweden, founded in 1668 as Riksens Ständers Bank and renamed in 1866 as Sveriges Riksbank, which is the world's oldest surviving central bank.

== The founding of Stockholms Banco ==
Johan Palmstruch had made two failed proposals for the creation of a banking institution in the 1650s before his third proposal, with the addition of a promise to pay half of the bank's profits to the crown, was accepted. King Charles X Gustav thus signed two charters on November 30, 1656 to create an exchange bank and a loans bank. The first of these (which opened in July 1657) took deposits for a fee (and accruing no interest) with the account owner later able to withdraw the money as cash or to write cheques. The second (which opened at the beginning of 1659) provided loans, financed by the bank owners and secured against property. These two departments were combined into Stockholms Banco with Palmstruch as general manager.

The bank itself was no great innovation, as it was a botched imitation of the large and successful banks in Amsterdam and Hamburg that had been founded earlier in the 17th century, but it was hoped that the bank would help to stabilise Sweden's currency. Sweden at that time did not have a single currency, rather there was one daler minted in copper (kopparmynt) and another minted in silver (silvermynt). As the metal content of a copper daler had to be worth as much as that of a silver one, this meant that copper daler were large and heavy plate-sized coins. In practice, however, the silver daler was worth more and these were often hoarded, so generally only these large kopparmynt daler were commonly available.

Palmstruch's first major innovation in combining these two banks was to use the money deposited by account holders to finance the loans rather than requiring capital to be provided by himself or the other bank owners. This soon became a problem, however, as deposits were usually short-term and the loans long-term, meaning that deposited money was unavailable to be withdrawn by account holders. This problem was rendered more acute when the copper content of the coins was lowered 17% in 1660 as account holders demanded the return of the copper daler they had deposited since they were now worth more as metal than as coins. It was impossible for the bank to fulfil these requests as the money had been paid out as loans.

== Kreditivsedlar – Europe's first modern banknotes ==
Palmstruch's second major innovation was the introduction of paper banknotes as a solution to the bank's problems balancing deposits and loans. To cover the amounts requested by the account holders, in 1661 he began to make out credit notes (Kreditivsedlar) in round denominations which were freely transferable and backed by the promise of future payment in metal. These were the first European banknotes.

These banknotes became very popular very quickly simply because they were much easier to carry than the large copper daler, especially for making large payments (a note could be sent in an envelope – previously the large coins had to be transported by horse and cart). A further reason was that when the amount of copper in the coins was reduced the old coins were taken out of circulation faster than new ones could be minted, meaning that there was a shortage of money which could only be solved by replacing the coins with banknotes.

The first banknotes, issued in 1661, were all signed by Palmstruch himself as well as by the other clerks of the bank. These were issued in denominations of 5, 25, 100 and 1000 copper daler (kopparmynt).

A second series of these banknotes, known as Palmstruchare, was issued in 1666 in denominations of 10, 25, 50 and 100 silver daler (silvermynt).

== Failure and legacy ==
The invention of banknotes by Palmstruch eventually caused more problems than it solved. The bank was able to print banknotes on a seemingly unlimited scale and as lending rose rapidly in 1663, the bank's loans ceased to be dependent on the deposits of other account holders. By autumn of that year loans and note issues had reached such levels that the value of the banknotes began to fall.

When people returned to the bank to have their credit notes honoured, the bank did not have enough metal reserved to fulfil all these requests and from October onwards the bank was increasingly obliged to refuse, with operations ceasing entirely in 1664. The government and Riksdag (Swedish Parliament) were forced to take over, reducing the outstanding loans and exchanging the notes for coins. The liquidation of the bank was completed in 1667 and Palmstruch was imprisoned, blamed with the bank's losses.

On September 17, 1668, Palmstruch's privilege to operate a bank was transferred to the Riksens Ständers Bank, operated by the parliament. Due to the failure of Stockholms Banco, this new bank was not permitted to issue banknotes until the 18th century. The Riksens Ständers Bank was later renamed Sveriges Riksbank and remains the central bank of Sweden to this day.

== See also ==
- Taula de canvi de Barcelona
- Banco del Giro
- Hamburger Bank
- Bank of Amsterdam
- List of banks in Sweden
