= Lauriston Castle =

16th century tower house in Edinburgh, Scotland

Coordinates: 55.9711986°N 3.2784641°W

- Edinburgh, Scotland; NT2021676093
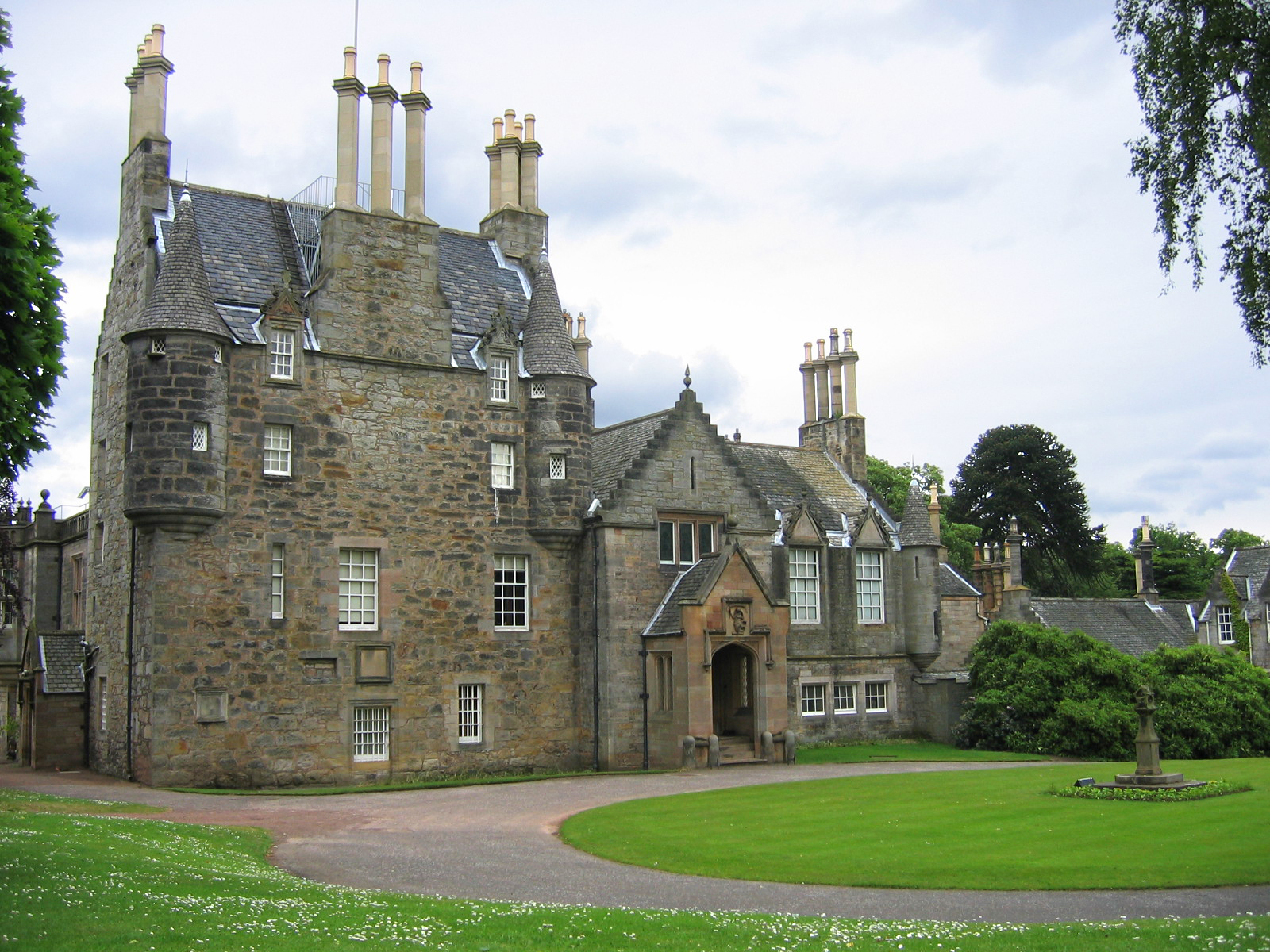
- Lauriston Castle from the south

Site information
- Type: L-plan tower house with a Jacobean range
- Owner: City of Edinburgh Council
- Open to the public: Yes

Location
- Location within the City of Edinburgh council area

Site history
- Built: c. 1590
- Built by: probably Archibald Napier, 7th Laird of Merchiston
- In use: 16th century to 21st century
- Materials: Stone

Designations

Inventory of Gardens and Designed Landscapes in Scotland
- Official name: Lauriston Castle
- Designated: 30 June 1987
- Reference no.: GDL00255

Lauriston Castle is a 16th-century tower house with 19th-century extensions overlooking the Firth of Forth, in Edinburgh, Scotland. It lies on Cramond Road South, between Cramond, Davidson's Mains, and Silverknowes. The substantial grounds, Lauriston Castle Gardens, operate as a local park. The castle was bequeathed to the Edinburgh Corporation (post 1975 known as Edinburgh City Council) and hosts the Lord Provost's annual Garden Party. The house is a Category A listed building and the grounds are included in the Inventory of Gardens and Designed Landscapes in Scotland.

== History ==
A Lauriston Castle which stood on the site in medieval times was almost totally destroyed in the raids on Edinburgh in 1544 by the Earl of Hertford's troops.

A tower house was rebuilt around 1590 by Sir Archibald Napier of Merchiston, father of the mathematician John Napier, for his first son by his second marriage, also named Archibald (1575–1600), known as Napier of Woolmet. After Laurieston died in 1629 his widow and three young children lived there.

In 1683 the estate was purchased by Edinburgh goldsmith and financier William Law, father of economist John Law, shortly before his death. John Law then inherited the estate and it stayed in his family until 1823 when sold to banker and mineralogist Thomas Allan. In 1827 Allan commissioned William Burn (1789–1870) to extend the house. Subsequent owners were the Right Hon. Andrew Lord Rutherfurd (1791–1854), and Thomas Macknight Crawfurd of Cartsburn and Lauriston Castle, 8th Baron of Cartsburn from 1871 to 1902.

On 3 December 1827 Sir Walter Scott wrote in his journal:

Went with Tom Allan to see his building at Lauriston where he has displayed good taste—supporting instead of tearing down or destroying the old Chateau which once belonged to the famous Mississippi Law. The additions are in very good taste and will make a most comfortable house."

William Robert Reid, proprietor of Morison & Co., and his wife Margaret, acquired Lauriston Castle in 1902, and left their home to Scotland on the condition that it should be preserved unchanged. The City of Edinburgh Council has administered the house since her death in 1926, when it was bequeathed to the nation of Scotland.

In 2013 it was suggested that the castle could be renovated and turned into an official residence for the Lord Provost of Edinburgh. The proposal did not go ahead due to costs and other reasons.

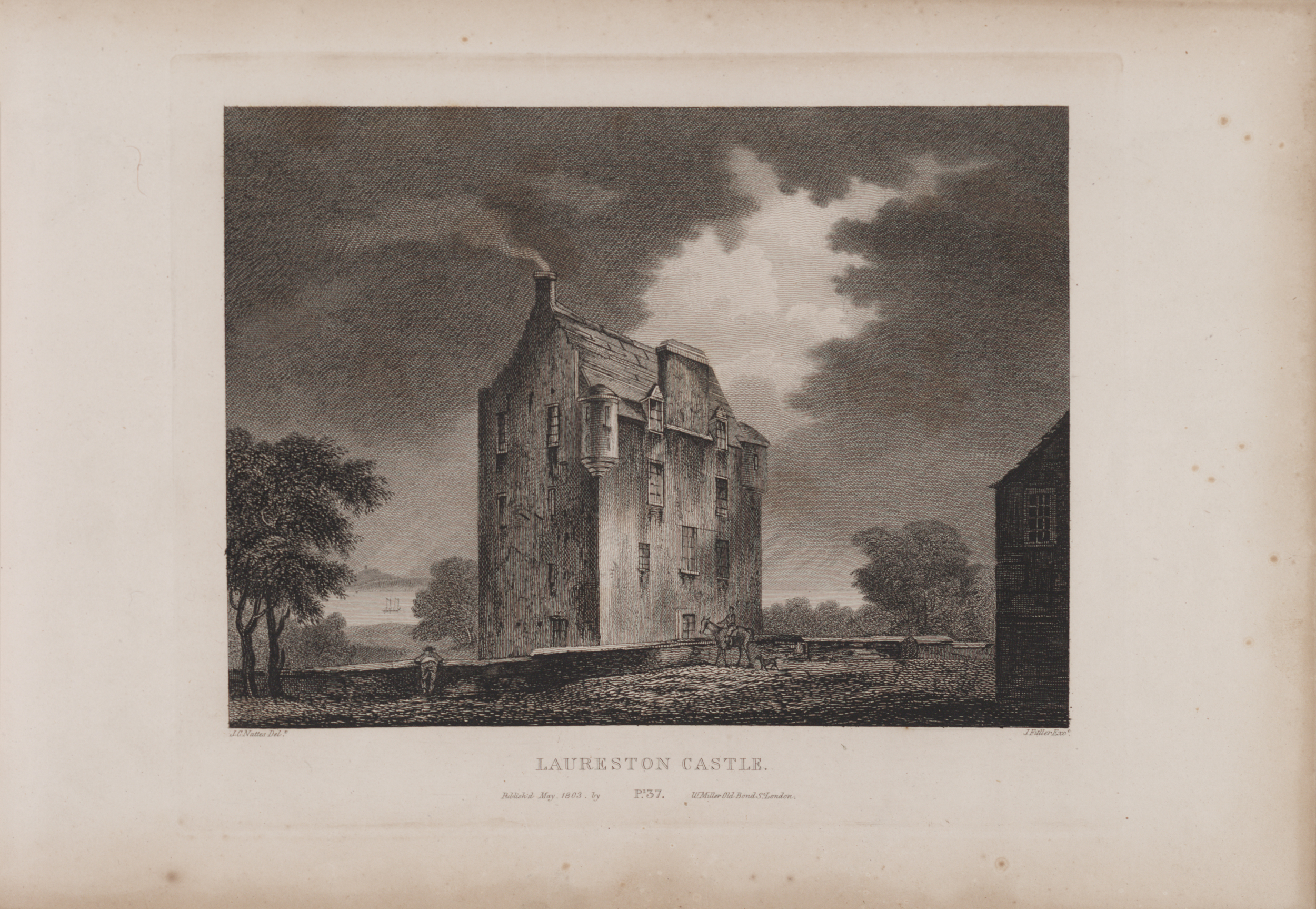
Engraving of the castle by James Fittler, 1804

== Design ==
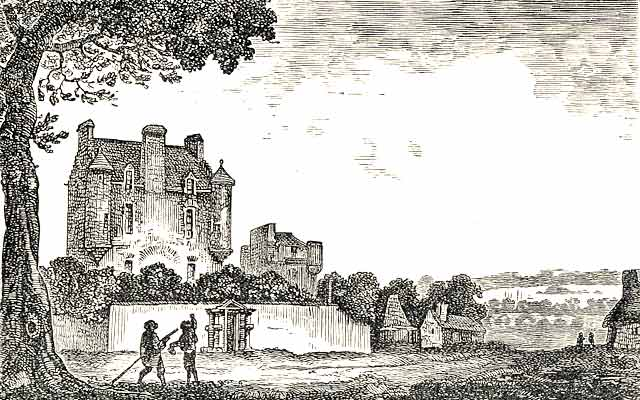
Lauriston Castle as it appeared in 1775, before the 1827 addition by William Burn.

Lauriston Castle was originally a four-storey, stone L plan tower house, with a circular stair tower, with two-storey angle turrets complete with gun loops. A Jacobean range was added in 1827, to convert it to a country manor. This was designed by the prominent architect William Burn.

The majority of the interior is Edwardian.

== Gardens ==
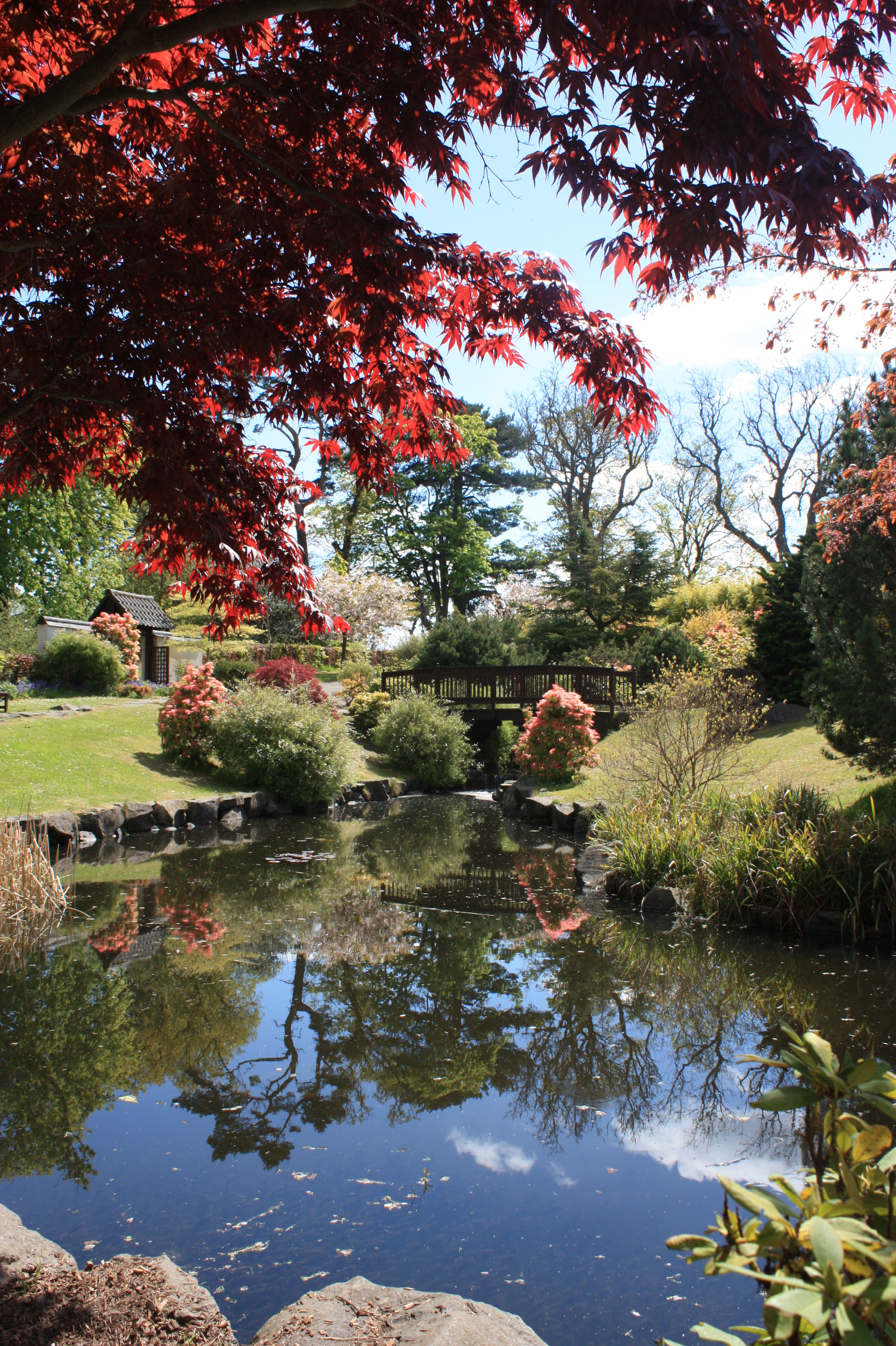
Japanese Garden at Lauriston Castle, Edinburgh

The extensive gardens at Lauriston are open to the public at no charge and include a number of different styles and forms. A Japanese garden of one hectare built by Takashi Sawano as the Edinburgh–Kyoto Friendship Garden, opened in August 2002.
