= Compagnie des Indes =

Compagnie des Indes (lit. 'Company of the Indies') or India Company, refer to several European chartered companies involved in long-distance trading. The Indian Company, a general term, was a company that dealt with trade between a European capital and its colonies. The word India was used, until the 19th century, to refer to various lands, because the world had not yet been mapped accurately.

== Great Britain ==
- East India Company
- Company of Scotland

== Netherlands ==
- Dutch West India Company

== Portugal ==
- Portuguese East India Company

== Sweden ==
- Swedish East India Company

== In France ==
- First French East Indies Company, in existence from 1604 to 1614
- French West India Company, active in the Western Hemisphere from 1664 to 1674
- Louis XIV's East India Company also established in 1664, merged into Law's Company in 1719
- John Law's Company, established in 1717 as Compagnie d'Occident and rebranded as Compagnie des Indes in 1719, placed into government receivership in April 1721
- French Indies Company, created in 1723 from the reorganization of the non-monetary operations of Law's Company, liquidated in 1770
- Compagnie de Calonne, established in 1785 and liquidated in 1794

== See also ==
- Compagnie de Chine
- List of French colonial trading companies
