= Compagnie de Chine =

Compagnie de Chine or Compagnie de la Chine may refer to two French ventures in the early modern period:

- Compagnie de Chine (1660-1664), a failed religious endeavor
- Compagnie de la Chine (1698-1719), a commercial enterprise

== See also ==
- Compagnie des Indes
- List of French colonial trading companies
