= Marcara Avanchintz =

17th-century Armenian trader in service of the French

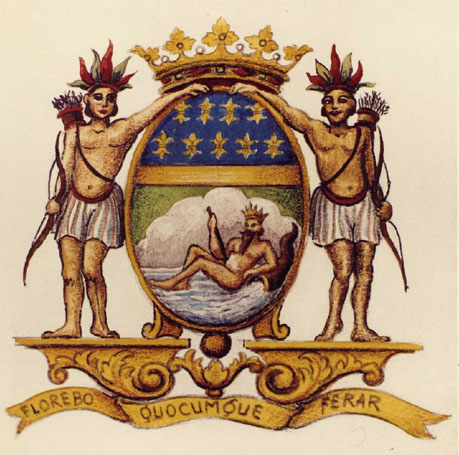
The French East India Company's coat of arms, with its motto: "Florebo quocumque ferar" (I will flourish wherever I will be brought.")

Marcara Avanchintz was a powerful 17th-century Armenian trader from Isfahan, Persia, who went into the service of Louis XIV. He became a Director of the newly founded French East Indian Company, together with François Caron, who was his direct superior, and Jean-François Leriget de La Faye.

Marcara arrived in India, at the kingdom of Golconda where he had great connections, in May 1669, and was successful in obtaining a trade agreement (a farmân) for the French.

Marcara however entered into a dispute with Caron, after Caron offered him to take personal bribes in the French East Indian Company trade. Maracara was imprisoned on accusations that he was favouring Armenian trade, and returned to France. Upon his return, Marcara initiated a trial against the French East Indian Company, which he won.

On this assignment François Martin wrote:

"It was a mistake to choose an Armenian, whose nation is well known in India, as Director for the Company of such a prestigious nation as ours. It had been surprising and had not served our reputation."

— François Martin.
