= John Law (novel) =

1864 novel by William Harrison Ainsworth

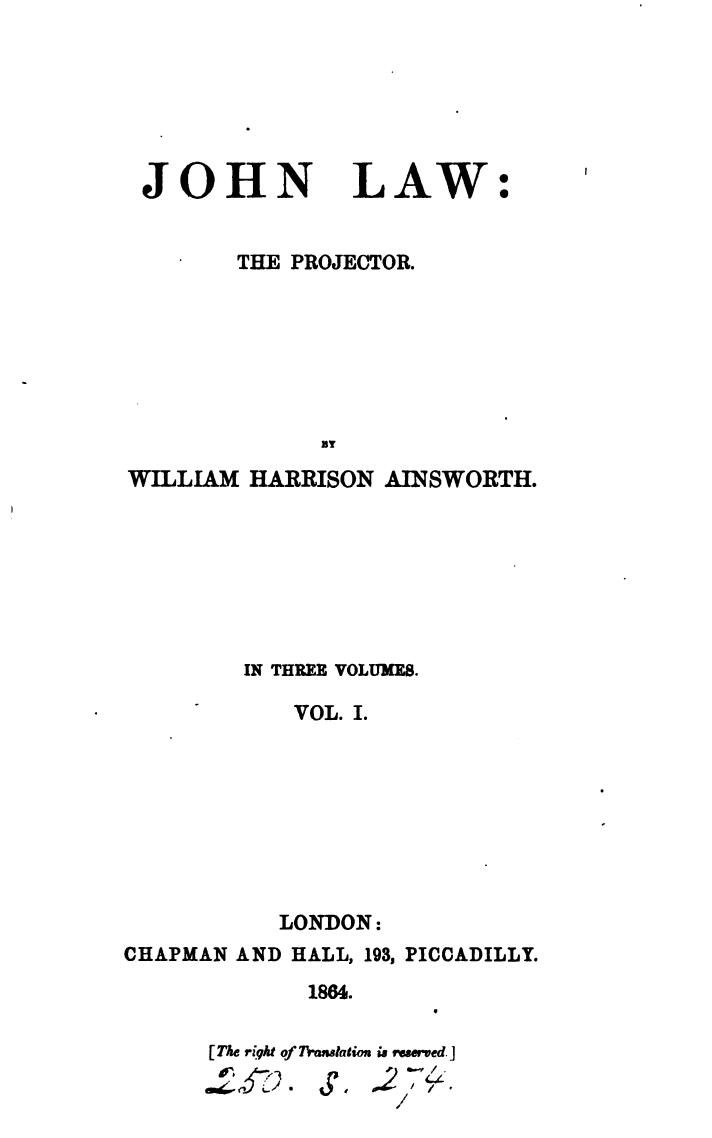
- Author: William Harrison Ainsworth
- Language: English
- Genre: Historical
- Publisher: Chapman and Hall
- Publication date: 1864
- Publication place: United Kingdom
- Media type: Print

John Law: The Projector is an 1864 historical novel by the British writer William Harrison Ainsworth. It was released in three volumes by the London publishing house Chapman and Hall. It focuses on the early eighteenth century Scottish financier John Law and his efforts to establish the Mississippi Company in Paris which ultimately went bankrupt after a speculative bubble.

In 1871 Ainsworth wrote a serialised novel The South Sea Bubble focusing on the near-contemporary collapse of the British South Sea Bubble.

== Bibliography ==
- Carver, Stephen James. The Life and Works of the Lancashire Novelist William Harrison Ainsworth, 1850–1882. Edwin Mellen Press, 2003.
- Michie, Ranald C. Guilty Money: The City of London in Victorian and Edwardian Culture, 1815–1914. Routledge, 2015.
- Sutherland, J.A. Victorian Novelists and Publishers. A&C Black, 2014.
