= Florebo quocumque ferar =

Latin phrase

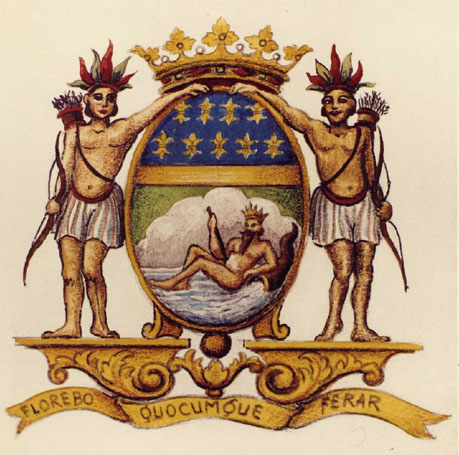
Blazon of the French East India Company

Flōrēbō quōcumque ferar is a Latin phrase which can be translated in English as "I will flourish wherever I am brought", i.e. "I will flourish wherever I go".

During the 17th and 18th century it was designated as the motto of the French East India Company by Louis XIV, and is written on its blazon.

The phrase is the motto of Réunion island, a French overseas department and an outermost region of the European Union in the South West Indian Ocean. It is also on the blazon created by the former governor Emile Merwart during the colonial exhibition held in Petite-Île in 1925.

Florebo quocumque ferar is also the motto of the Vergriete family (the "House of Griete"), a family of Flemish nobles attached to the seigneury of Cassel. The family name, from the Dutch word for daisy has been associated with this motto since the 16th century.
