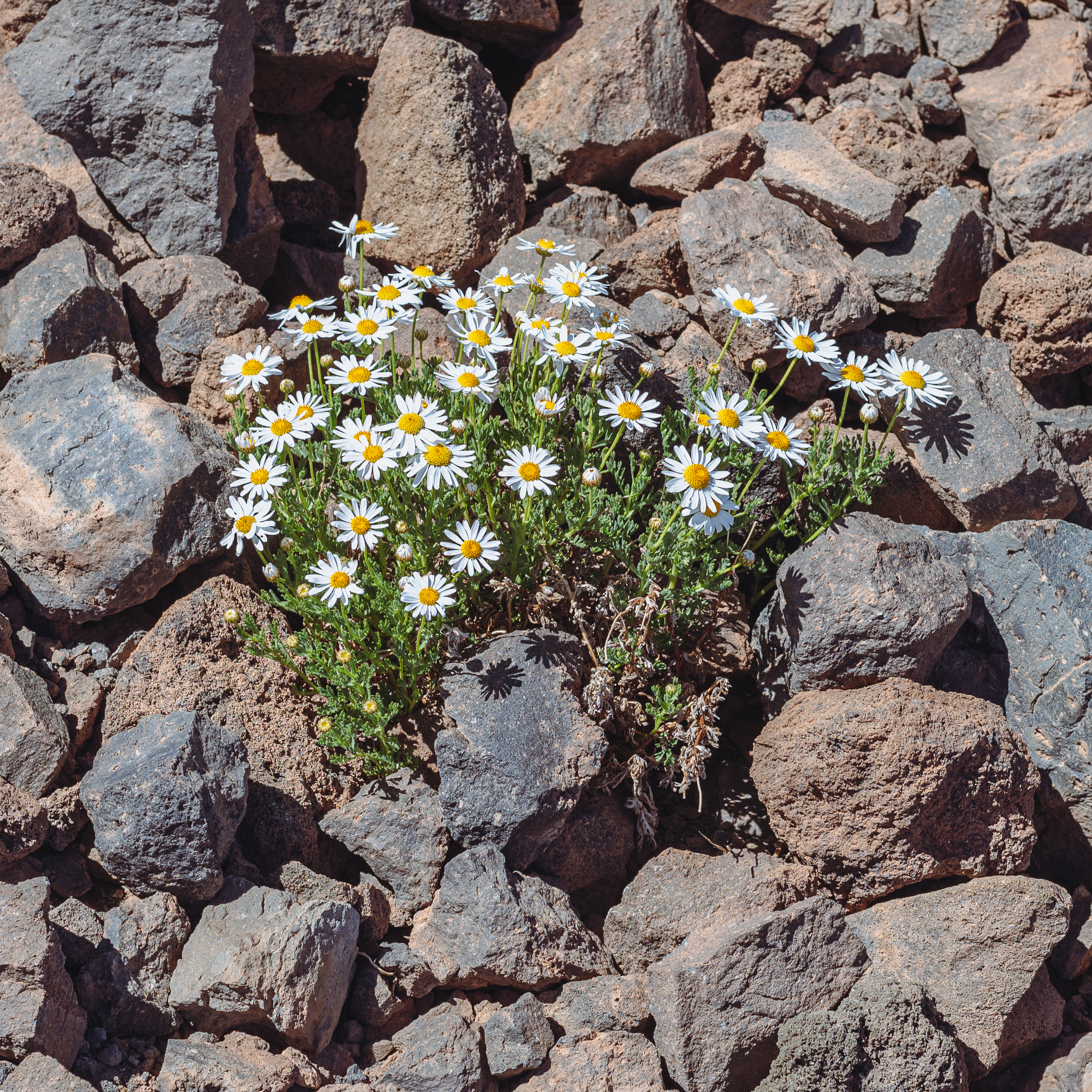

Scientific classification
- Kingdom: Plantae
- Clade: Tracheophytes
- Clade: Angiosperms
- Clade: Eudicots
- Clade: Asterids
- Order: Asterales
- Family: Asteraceae
- Genus: Argyranthemum
- Species: A. tenerifae

Binomial name
- Argyranthemum tenerifae Humphries

Synonyms
- Argyranthemum anethifolium Webb; Chrysanthemum anethifolium sensu Masferer

= Argyranthemum tenerifae =

Species of plant

Argyranthemum tenerifae, the Tenerife daisy or Teide dill daisy, is a subtropical subshrub in the family Asteraceae.

== Description ==
The glabrous to scabrous and upward growing stems of the plant grow 30–50 cm and are branched from the base. The outline of its leaves are obovate to oblong. The leaves are furthermore pinnatisect to bipinnatisect, glabrous to scabrous and grow 2-6x0.3-1.6 cm in size. The inflorescence is a corymb with 2-12 flower heads with peduncles of up to 30 cm in length. The petals of its flowers are white, while the flower discs are yellow. Its flowering period is from March to October and the fruiting period from April to October.

Its chromomsome count is 2n = 2x = 18 like in all other taxa of the genus Argyranthemum. They consist of 14 meta- to submetacentric and 4 subtelocentric and satellited chromosomes.

== Distribution ==
The alpine plant can only be found in the Caldera las Cañadas of the Canary Island of Tenerife. It grows in altitudes of 1900 to 2300m, with some individual plants growing in altitudes of up to 3700m. The area they're growing stretches El Portillo in the north-east to Llana de Ucanca and Boca de Tauce in the south. It is less common on the north-western slopes of the Teide and in the areas of Llano de Maja, Izaña and Siete Fuentes.

== Habitat ==
The species grows on volcanic rock fields, in small fractures filled with soil, on the top of pumice substrate and nitrophilous habitats like the margin of roads.

== Ecology ==
A. tenerifae is one of the three preferred food plant species in both the high mountain open shrub and the Canary pine forest for Ovis ammon musimon, that were released on Tenerife in 1971. Argyranthemum gammacytorhabdovirus, a novel plant virus from the family of Rhabdoviridae, was identified from plant RNA-seq data available.
