= List of French colonial trading companies =

This is a list of French colonial trading companies established under a royal charter to conduct trade between France and its colonies. Although more limited trading companies were established in the 16th century, they expanded greatly in the 17th century following on the models established by the British East India Company and the Dutch East India Company. Beginning in 1626, Cardinal Richelieu, acting as Grandmaster of Navigation and Commerce, authorized a range of companies to monopolize trade around the world in line with French interests, as well as expand French colonies and convert local populations to Catholicism. These ambitions were further expanded under Jean-Baptiste Colbert with the founding of the French East and West Indies companies in 1664.

The company charters were usually limited to a specific commodity or region, but over time and through mergers the reach of these companies could change dramatically. Their charter could also include oversight and control of colonies, including ensuring security, issuing currency, and imposing local taxes. They also often engaged in military conflicts to protect their trade monopolies.

== List of French chartered companies ==
founded	dissolved	name	also known as	area of operation	notes
1601	1604	Compagnie française des mers orientales		East Indies	failed
1604	1615	Compagnie Le Roy et Godefroy		East Indies	succeeded by the Compagnie des Moluques
1611	?	Compagnie de Montmorency pour les Indes Orientales		East Indies	failed
1614	1627	Compagnie des marchands de Rouen et de Saint-Malo	Compagnie de Rouen	Canada	merged into the Compagnie de la Nouvelle-France
1615	1627	Compagnie des Moluques		East Indies	failed
1621	1627	Compagnie de Montmorency		Canada	merged into the Compagnie de la Nouvelle-France
1624	1634	Compagnie du Sénégal et de Gambie		West Africa	renamed Compagnie du Cap Vert
1626	1628	Compagnie de la Nacelle de Saint Pierre fleurdelysée	Compagnie du Saint Esprit	Atlantic fisheries	failed
1626	1635	Compagnie de Saint-Christophe		Saint Kitts and Nevis	succeeded by Compagnie des îles d'Amérique
1626	1659	Compagnie normande	Compagnie Rozée	West Africa	merged into the Compagnie du Cap-Vert et du Sénégal
1627	1663	Compagnie de la Nouvelle-France	Compagnie des Cent-Associés	Canada	became a royal province then succeeded by Compagnie française des Indes Occidentales
1633	1652	Compagnie de Rouen		French Guiana	acquired by the second Compagnie de la France équinoxiale
1634	1658	Compagnie du Cap Vert		West Africa	renamed Compagnie du Cap-Vert et du Sénégal
1635	1651	Compagnie des îles d'Amérique		Caribbean	merged into the Compagnie française des Indes Occidentales
1637	1664	Compagnie de Madagascar		Madagascar	merged into the Compagnie française des Indes Orientales
1642	1664	Compagnie d'Orient		Madagascar	merged into the Compagnie française des Indes Orientales
1644	1669	Compagnie du Nord	Compagnie de la mer Baltique	Scandinavia/Baltic Sea	failed
1644	1663	Compagnie des Habitants	Communauté des Habitants	Canada	split off fur-trading activities of the Compagnie de la Nouvelle-France
1651	1653	Compagnie de la France équinoxiale		French Guiana	succeeded by the second Compagnie de la France équinoxiale
1658	1664	Compagnie du Cap-Vert et du Sénégal		West Africa	merged into the Compagnie française des Indes Occidentales
1660	1664	Compagnie de Chine		China	succeeded by the Compagnie française des Indes Orientales
1663	1664	Compagnie de la France équinoxiale	Compagnie de Cayenne	French Guiana	merged into the Compagnie française des Indes Occidentales
1664	1674	Compagnie française des Indes Occidentales		Canada, West Africa, Caribbean, French Guiana	liquidated
1664	1719	Compagnie française des Indes Orientales		East Africa, India, China, East Indies	merged into John Law's Compagnie des Indes
1670	1685	Compagnie du Levant		Middle East	succeeded by the Compagnie de la Méditerranée
1673	1681	Compagnie du Sénégal		West Africa	succeeded, in part, by the Compagnie de Guinée
1675	1675	Compagnie d'Occident		Canada & Caribbean	became the Ferme d'Occident
1675	1791	Ferme d'Occident	Ferme d'Ouest	Canada & Caribbean	
1682	1700	Compagnie de la Baie du Nord	Compagnie du Nord	Hudson Bay	merged into the Compagnie de la Colonie
1684	1720	Compagnie de Guinée		West Africa	merged with the Compagnie de l'Asiento and then into the Compagnie perpétuelle des Indes
1685	1693	Compagnie de la Méditerranée		Middle East	failed
1685		Compagnie David Gradis et fils	Société française pour le commerce avec l'Outre-mer	Caribbean	still in operation.
1694	1718	Compagnie d'Afrique		North Africa	merged into John Law's Compagnie des Indes
1696	1702	Compagnie royal du Sénégal		West Africa	merged with the Compagnie de l'Asiento
1698	1720	Compagnie royale de la mer du Sud	Compagnie royale de la mer Pacifique	South Pacific	merged into John Law's Compagnie des Indes
1698	1720	Compagnie royale de Saint-Domingue	Compagnie de Saint-Domingue	Saint-Domingue	merged into John Law's Compagnie des Indes
1698	1719	Compagnie de Chine		China	merged into John Law's Compagnie des Indes
1699	1706	Compagnie de la Colonie	Compagnie du castor	Canada	failed
1701	1713	Compagnie de l'Asiento		West Africa & Caribbean	existed to provide enslaved Africans to Spanish colonies under the Asiento de Negros; abandoned following the Treaty of Utrecht
1709	1718	Compagnie du Sénégal		West Africa	merged into John Law's Compagnie des Indes
1712	1719	Compagnie de Barbarie		North Africa	merged into John Law's Compagnie des Indes
1712	1717	Compagnie de la Louisiane		Louisiana	merged into John Law's Compagnie d'Occident
1717	1719	Compagnie d'Occident		Canada, Louisiana & Caribbean	merged into the Compagnie des Indes
1719	1770	French Indies Company		Worldwide	part of John Law's System, then reorganized in 1723; liquidated in 1770
1741	1793	Compagnie royale d'Afrique		North Africa	slave traders; slavery in France abolished in February 1794
1748	1793	Société d'Angola	Compagnie d'Angola	Angola	slave traders; slavery in France abolished in February 1794
1748	1793	Grou et Michel	Compagnie de Guinée	Gulf of Guinea	slave traders; slavery in France abolished in February 1794
1785	1794	Compagnie de Calonne		Asia	liquidated during French Revolution

== See also ==
- Chartered company
- List of chartered companies
