= John Law's Bank =

Defunct financial institution

Banque Royale
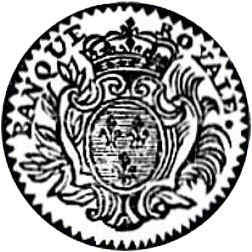
- Seal of the Banque Royale, 1720

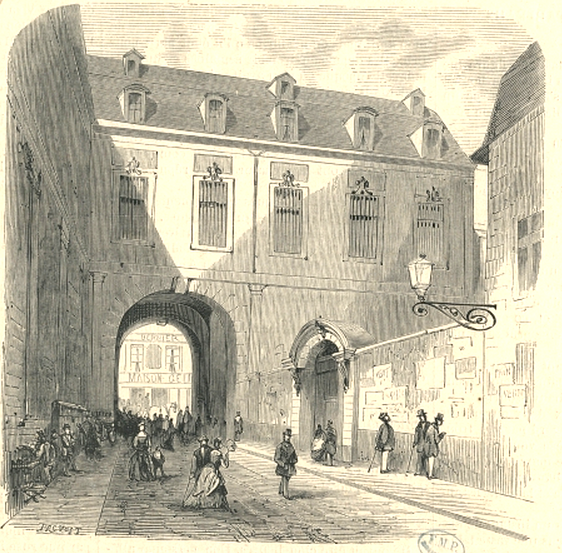
- Headquarters in Hôtel de Nevers in Paris
- Formerly: Banque générale (1716-1718)
- Type: Subsidiary
- Industry: Banking
- Founded: 1716
- Founder: John Law
- Defunct: 1723
- Parent: Mississippi Company (1720-1721)

John Law's Bank (French: banque de John Law) was a short-lived but highly consequential financial institution in the Kingdom of France, started by John Law in May 1716 as a private-sector joint-stock company, nationalized in December 1718, and acquired by his Company of the Indies in February 1720. It was France's first bank of issue, and has also been referred to as the country's first central bank.

== Name ==
The bank was formally known as the Banque générale (English: General Bank) upon establishment in 1716, and renamed to Banque royale (English: Royal Bank) upon nationalization in late 1718. It was commonly associated with its founder and thus widely referred to as John Law's Bank.

== Background ==
Various projects of institutions that could be viewed as central banks were conceived in early modern France, but none came to fruition before Law's venture. The oldest documented endeavors failed in 1548 and 1566 despite tentative royal support. A third documented project, under Henry IV, adopted the name "Banque de France" and was approved by the Conseil Royal on 20 December 1608, but was not implemented. A state bank inspired by the Venetian Banco del Giro was proposed in 1644. The sequence accelerated after the successful start of the Bank of England in 1694 and given the sorry state of French finances in the late years of Louis XIV's reign, with several projects promoted from 1701 onwards.

John Law had worked for years on various concepts of national banks, in part inspired by the Bank of England, and had come close to persuading the French kingdom to endorse his proposals when Louis XIV died on 1 September 1715. Louis XIV's long reign and wars had bankrupted the French monarchy. The regent Philippe II, Duke of Orléans first declined to embrace Law's ideas, which had no support from France's established financiers. Instead, the Regent appointed Adrien Maurice de Noailles, 3rd Duke of Noailles to address the kingdom's financial emergency, which Noailles did through a combination of forced debt restructuring, fiscal austerity, and shake-downs of the financiers. Noailles's policies did not succeed at restoring confidence and credit, however, and the Regent eventually turned back to Law and his bank project.

== Banque Générale ==
Banknote signed by Law for the Banque Générale. The text reads, using modern French spelling: "La Banque promet payer au porteur à vue cinquante écus d'espèces, du poids et titre de ce jour, valeur reçue à Paris le 10 juin 1718"

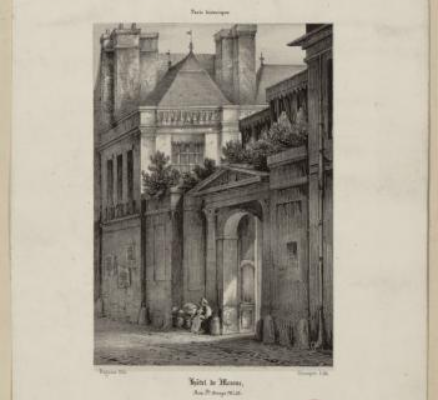
Hôtel de Mesmes on rue Sainte-Avoye (now rue du Temple), seat of Law's Bank in 1716-1719; demolished in the late 1820s

On 2 May 1716, the Regency Council approved a motion presented by Noailles to "give Mr Law the power to establish a bank", albeit on a less ambitious scheme than that suggested by Law to comptroller-general Nicolas Desmarets in Louis XIV's dying days. That same day, letters patent were issued giving Law's General Bank an issuance privilege for 20 years, with the right to issue banknotes denominated in écus de banque set at 5 French livres per écu. On 20 May 1715, a further set of letters patent allowed Law to capitalize his bank by issuing 1,200 shares at 5,000 livres face value. The Banque Générale was thus a private bank, with capacity to finance France's debt but no role in its fiscal revenue collection, whereas Law's proposal to Desmarets had envisioned a public bank endowed with tax-collecting authority.

The conditions for share subscription made it possible to pay mostly in government bills accepted at face value, which was highly advantageous to subscribers since these forms of state debt traded at a 60 percent market discount at the time. Law bought 25 percent of the shares, while by some accounts the king owned 380 shares.

The bank was initially established at Law's home on Place Louis-le-Grand (now 15 place Vendôme, part of the Hôtel Ritz) In the summer of 1716, it moved to the Hôtel de Mesmes on rue Sainte-Avoye, closer to what was then the commercial and financial hub of Paris around Les Halles. In April 1717, Law purchased the nearby Hôtel de Soissons from its then owner the Prince of Carignan with the intent to relocate the bank there, but that transaction was stalled by Carignan's creditors.

== Banque Royale ==
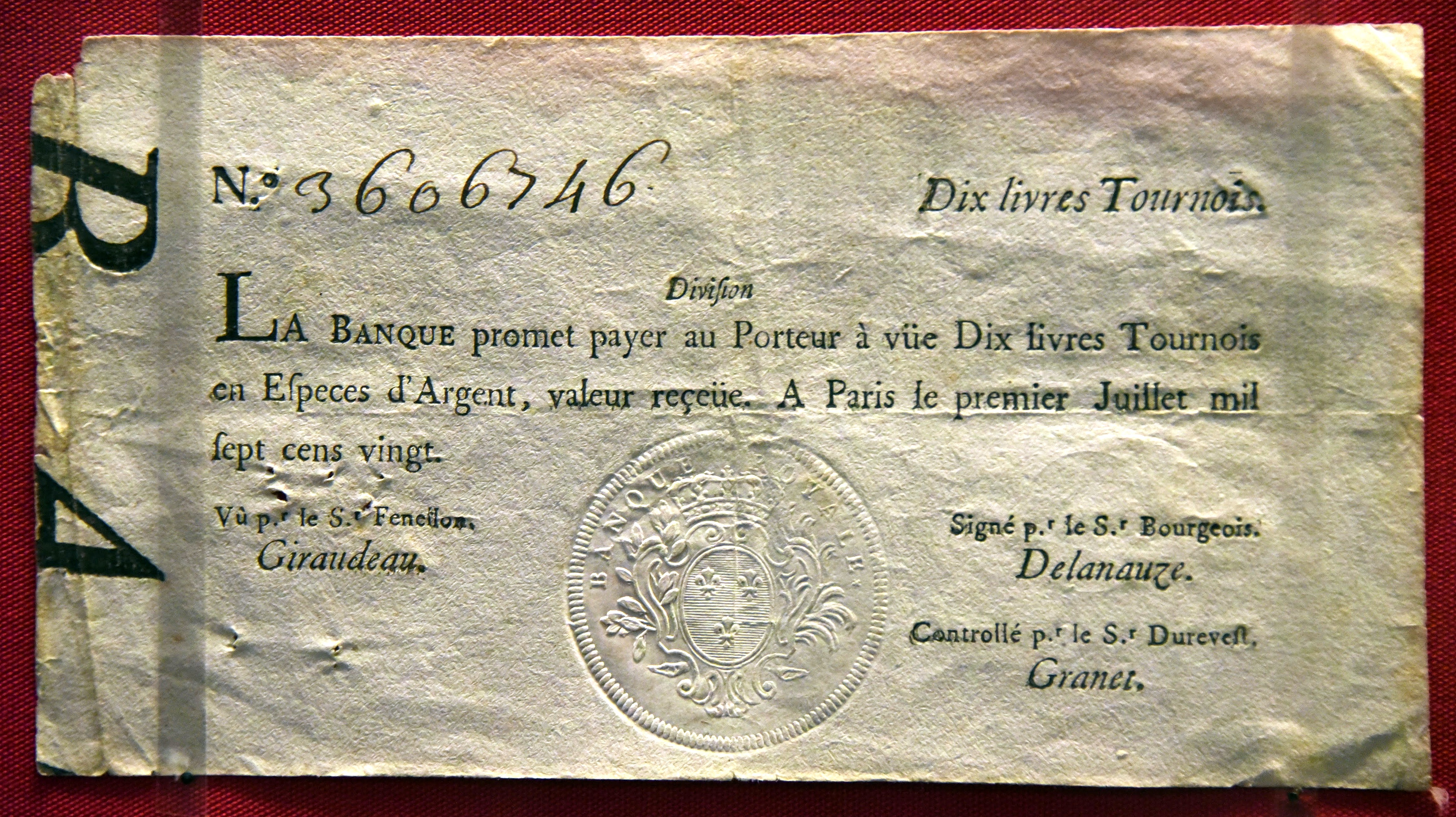
Banknote of the Banque Royale, July 1720, kept at the British Museum

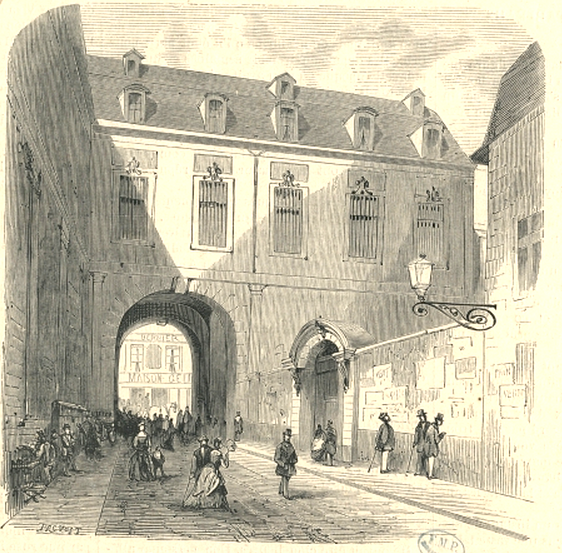
Hôtel de Nevers in Paris, seat of the Banque Royale in 1720

The decision to nationalize the bank, long advocated by Law, was made in a context of unveiling of the Cellamare conspiracy and diplomatic escalation in the War of the Quadruple Alliance, as it appeared that France may need to increase its military expenditure. An edict of 4 December 1718 announced the conversion of the Banque Générale into the Banque Royale, by which all private shareholders were reimbursed at face value, namely 5,000 livres per share. Given the discount at the time of subscription, this represented a typical annualized return of 64 percent. A separate decree on 27 December 1718 specified that all large transactions should be paid in banknotes in the bank's branches in Amiens, La Rochelle, Lyon, Orléans and Tours.

By the time of its nationalization, the bank had banknotes in circulation for a total 39.5 million livres, which were trusted and circulated at par. That circulation was comparable in volume to that of the Bank of England at the same time.

From then the bank remained managed by Law on behalf of the King, and all its profits were transferred to the Royal Treasury. From January 1719, it began issuing notes that were not backed by reserves of specie. As such, Law's bank was one of the first European financial institutions to develop the use of fiat money. That led to a considerable expansion in the amount of banknotes in circulation, estimated to have grown tenfold in the following year. In early 1720, it moved to the Hôtel de Nevers, part of the former Palais Mazarin in Paris.

== Merger with Law's Company and aftermath ==
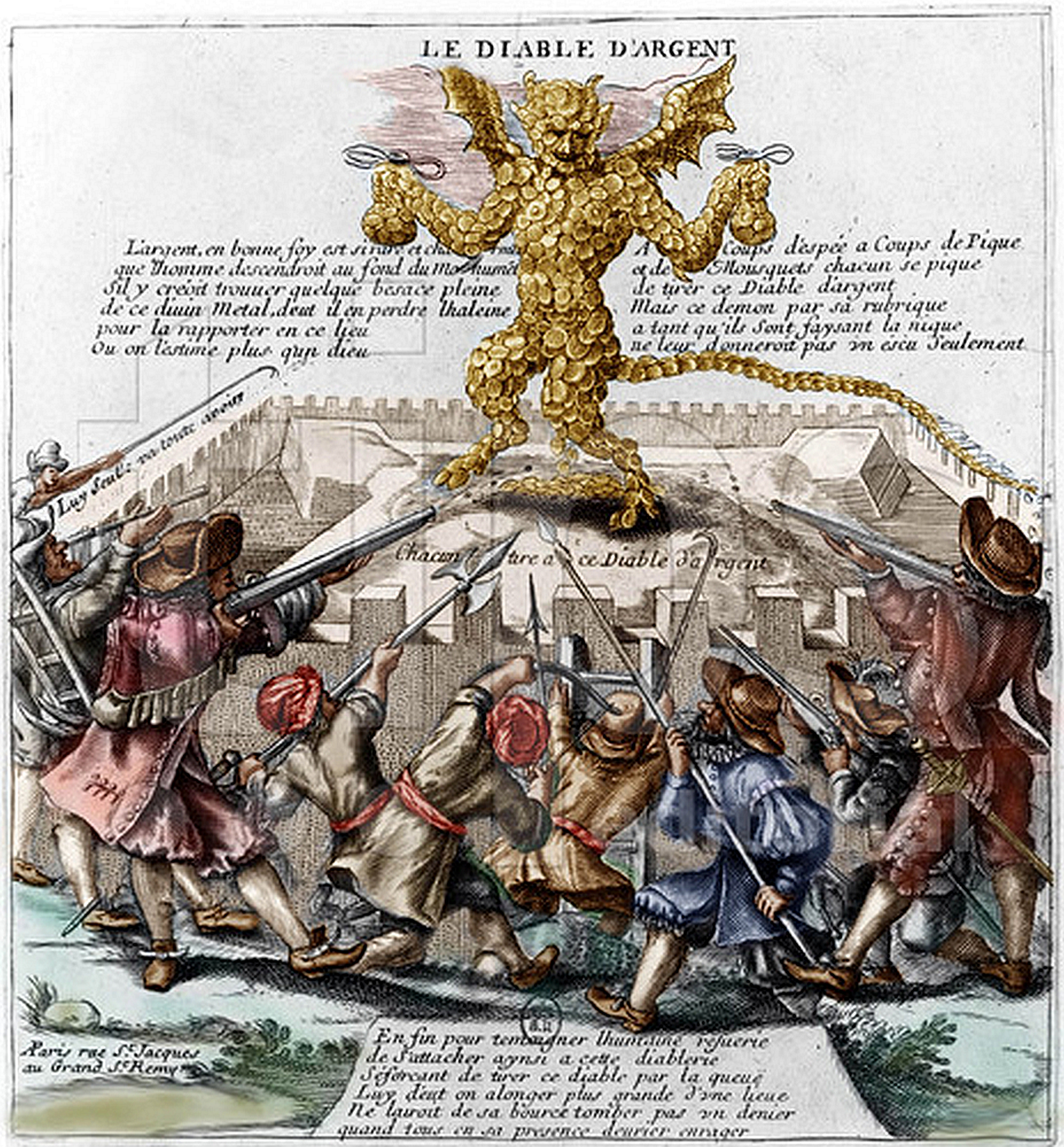
Le diable d'argent, satirical print of 1720

In February 1720, the bank was subsumed into John Law's Company, after which the company owned it and managed its operations. Later on, a bank run ensued when the value of the new paper currency was halved. During the subsequent restructuring, the French authorities decided to assume the liabilities of the bankrupt bank while leaving the (parent) company in the ownership of its existing shareholders. The bank was eventually liquidated in November 1723.

== See also ==
- Money creation
- List of banks in France
