= Compagnie de la Chine (1698–1719) =

Former French trading company

The Compagnie de la Chine was the first French trading venture that conducted actual maritime trade directly with China, following earlier failed attempts. It started in 1698 with the successful expedition of the French ship Amphitrite, and ended in 1719 by being absorbed into John Law's Company.

== Overview ==
In the fall of 1697, shipowner Jean Jourdan de Groucé was supported by minister Jérôme Phélypeaux de Pontchartrain to outfit the Amphitrite, circumventing the theoretical mandate of the then-moribund French East India Company. He sailed on 6 March 1698 from La Rochelle, arrived in Canton on 2 November that year, and returned on 13 August 1700. That maiden voyage marked the inception of direct maritime trade between France and China. It was undertaken on behalf of the Société de Jourdan led by entrepreneur Jean Jourdan. This venture turned out to be extremely successful, and the Société de Jourdan took the more permanent name Compagnie de la Chine in 1700 or 1701.

The Compagnie de la Chine was relaunched in 1712, and eventually absorbed in 1719 by John Law's Compagnie d'Occident, together with the East India Company that had been originally chartered by Jean-Baptiste Colbert in 1664. On that occasion, Law's company had its name changed to the Compagnie des Indes, which in the vocabulary of the time included China.

== See also ==
- Compagnie de Chine (1660-1664)
- List of French colonial trading companies
