= Compagnie de Chine (1660-1664) =

French trading company

The Compagnie de Chine was a short-lived French trading company, established in 1660 by the Catholic society Compagnie du Saint-Sacrement and merged in 1664 into Louis XIV's East India Company.

== Overview ==
The Compagnie du Saint-Sacrement established the China Company in order to dispatch missionaries to Asia (initially Bishops François Pallu, Pierre Lambert de la Motte and Ignace Cotolendi of the newly founded Paris Foreign Missions Society). The company was modelled on the Dutch East India Company.

A ship was built in the Netherlands by the shipowner Fermanel, but the ship foundered soon after being launched. The only remaining solution for the missionaries was to travel on land, since Portuguese ships refused to embark non-Padroado missionaries, and Dutch and British ships refused to take Catholic missionaries at all.

In 1664, the China Company was merged by Jean-Baptiste Colbert with the Compagnie d'Orient and Compagnie de Madagascar into the Compagnie des Indes Orientales.

== See also ==
- Compagnie de la Chine (1698-1719)
- List of French colonial trading companies
