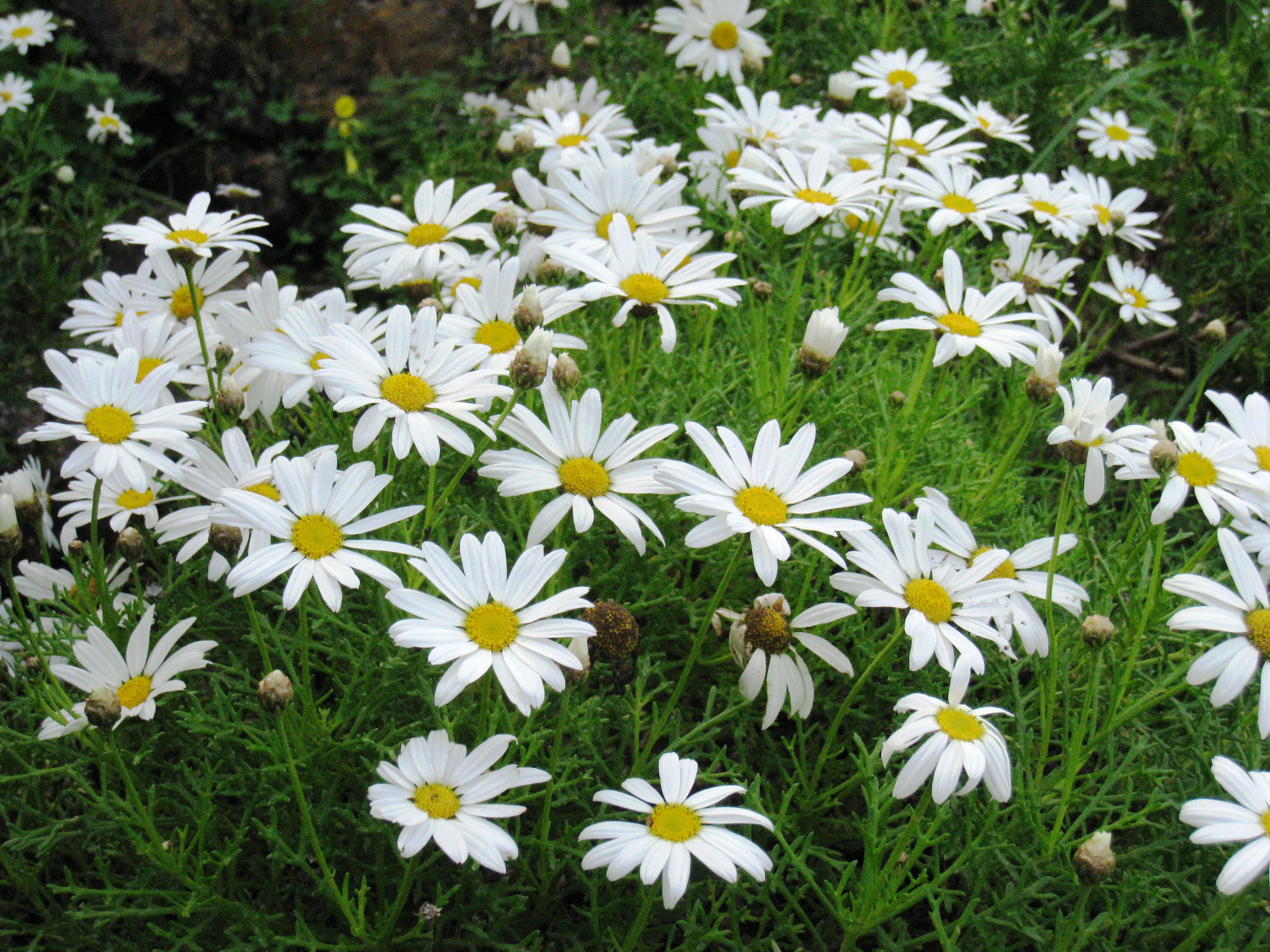
- Argyranthemum frutescens

Scientific classification
- Kingdom: Plantae
- Clade: Tracheophytes
- Clade: Angiosperms
- Clade: Eudicots
- Clade: Asterids
- Order: Asterales
- Family: Asteraceae
- Subfamily: Asteroideae
- Tribe: Anthemideae
- Genus: Argyranthemum; Webb ex Sch.Bip.

Type species
- Argyranthemum jacobaeifolium Webb

Synonyms
- Scyphopappus B.Nord.; Chrysanthemum sect. Argyranthemum (Webb. ex Sch.Bip.) Benth. & Hook.f.; Chrysanthemum sect. Magarsa DC.; Chrysanthemum subg. Argyranthemum Harling; Monoptera Sch.Bip.; Preauxia Sch.Bip.; Stigmatotheca Sch.Bip.

= Argyranthemum =

Genus of flowering plants in the daisy family

Argyranthemum (marguerite, marguerite daisy, dill daisy) is a genus of flowering plants belonging to the family Asteraceae. Members of this genus are sometimes also placed in the genus Chrysanthemum.

The genus is endemic to Macaronesia, occurring only on the Canary Islands, the Savage Islands, and Madeira.

Argyranthemum frutescens is recorded as a food plant of the leaf-mining larva of the moth Bucculatrix chrysanthemella.

== Species ==
As of February 2020, Plants of the World Online accepted the following species:

- Argyranthemum adauctum (Link) Humphries
- Argyranthemum broussonetii (Pers.) Humphries
- Argyranthemum callichrysum (Svent.) Humphries
- Argyranthemum coronopifolium (Willd.) Webb
- Argyranthemum dissectum (Lowe) Lowe
- Argyranthemum escarrei (Svent.) Humphries
- Argyranthemum filifolium (Sch.Bip.) Humphries
- Argyranthemum foeniculaceum (Willd.) Webb ex Sch.Bip.
- Argyranthemum frutescens (L.) Sch.Bip.
- Argyranthemum gracile Sch.Bip.
- Argyranthemum haematomma Lowe
- Argyranthemum haouarytheum Humphries & Bramwell
- Argyranthemum hierrense Humphries
- Argyranthemum lemsii Humphries
- Argyranthemum lidii Humphries
- Argyranthemum maderense (D.Don) Humphries
- Argyranthemum pinnatifidum (L.f.) Webb
- Argyranthemum sundingii L.Borgen
- Argyranthemum sventenii Humphries & Aldridge
- Argyranthemum tenerifae Humphries
- Argyranthemum thalassophilum (Svent.) Humphries
- Argyranthemum webbii Sch.Bip.
- Argyranthemum winteri (Svent.) Humphries

== Cultivation ==
Hybrids of Argyranthemum species, some involving species in related genera, are widely sold as ornamental plants for summer bedding or containers. These cultivars produce prolific single or double-flowered daisy-like flowers in shades of white, pink, yellow and purple throughout summer. In the UK climate, they are generally half-hardy, and can be grown from seed or cuttings, or purchased as young plants to be planted out after all danger of frost has passed.

== Gallery ==
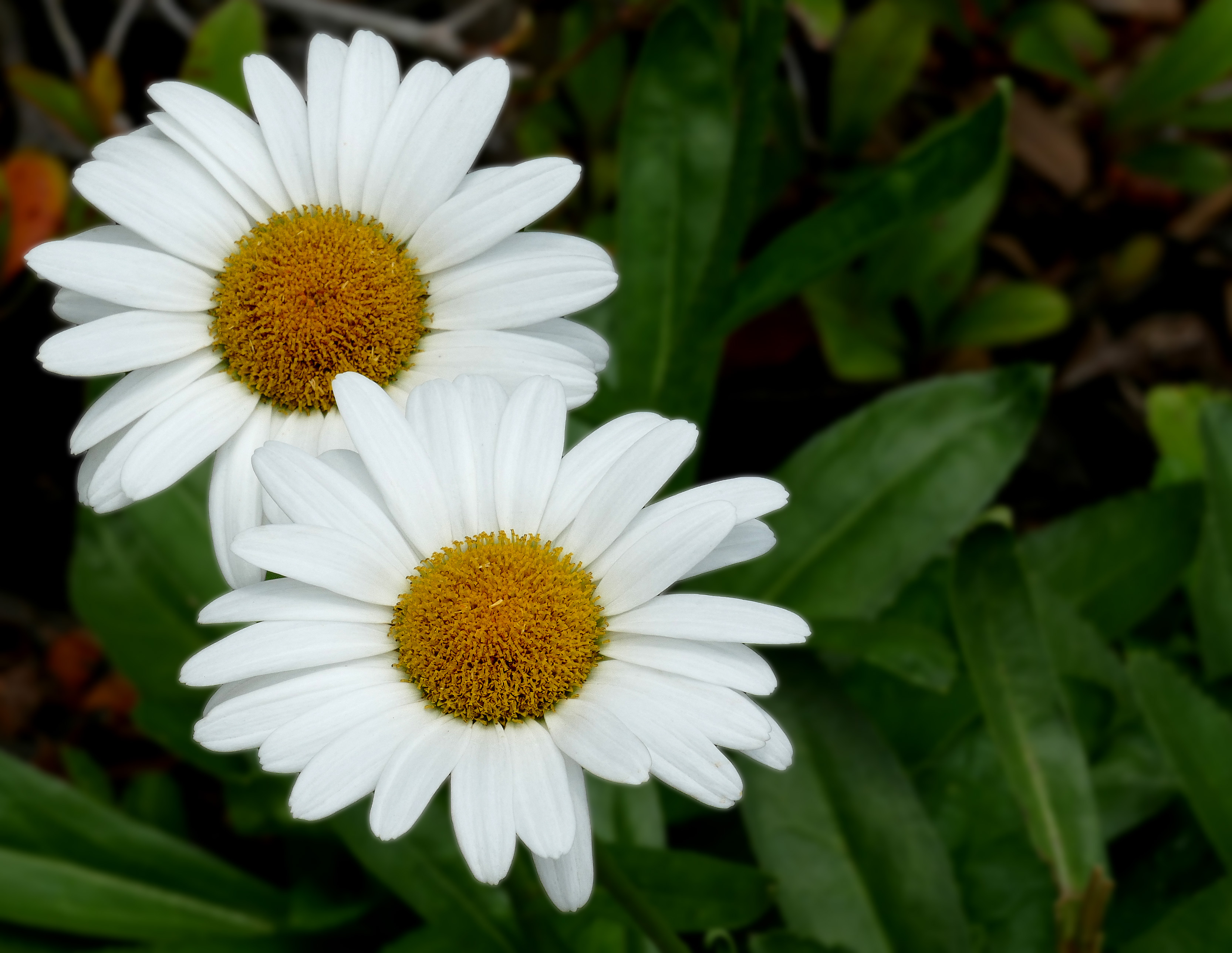
Daisy Marguerite -- Argyranthemum

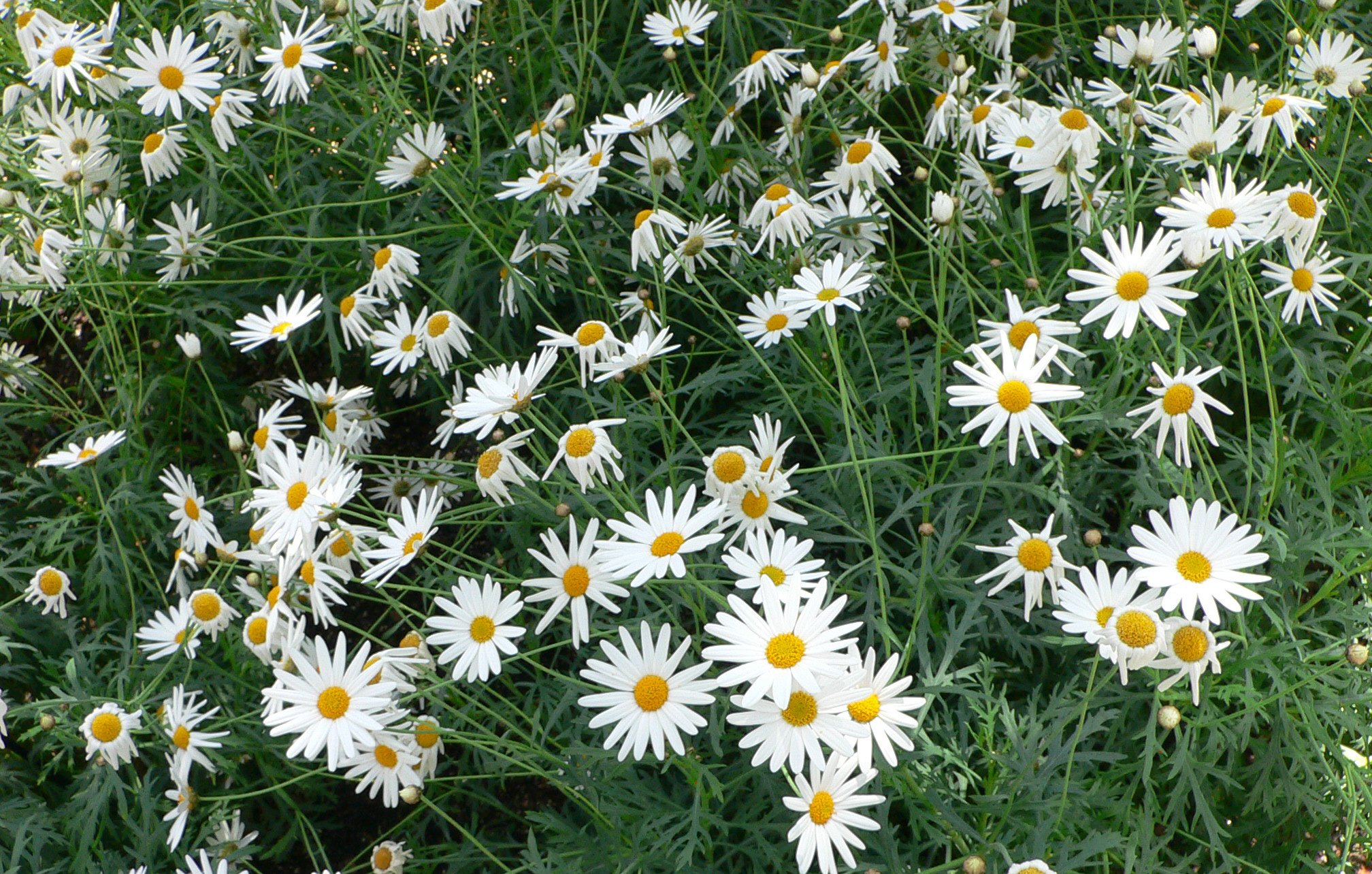

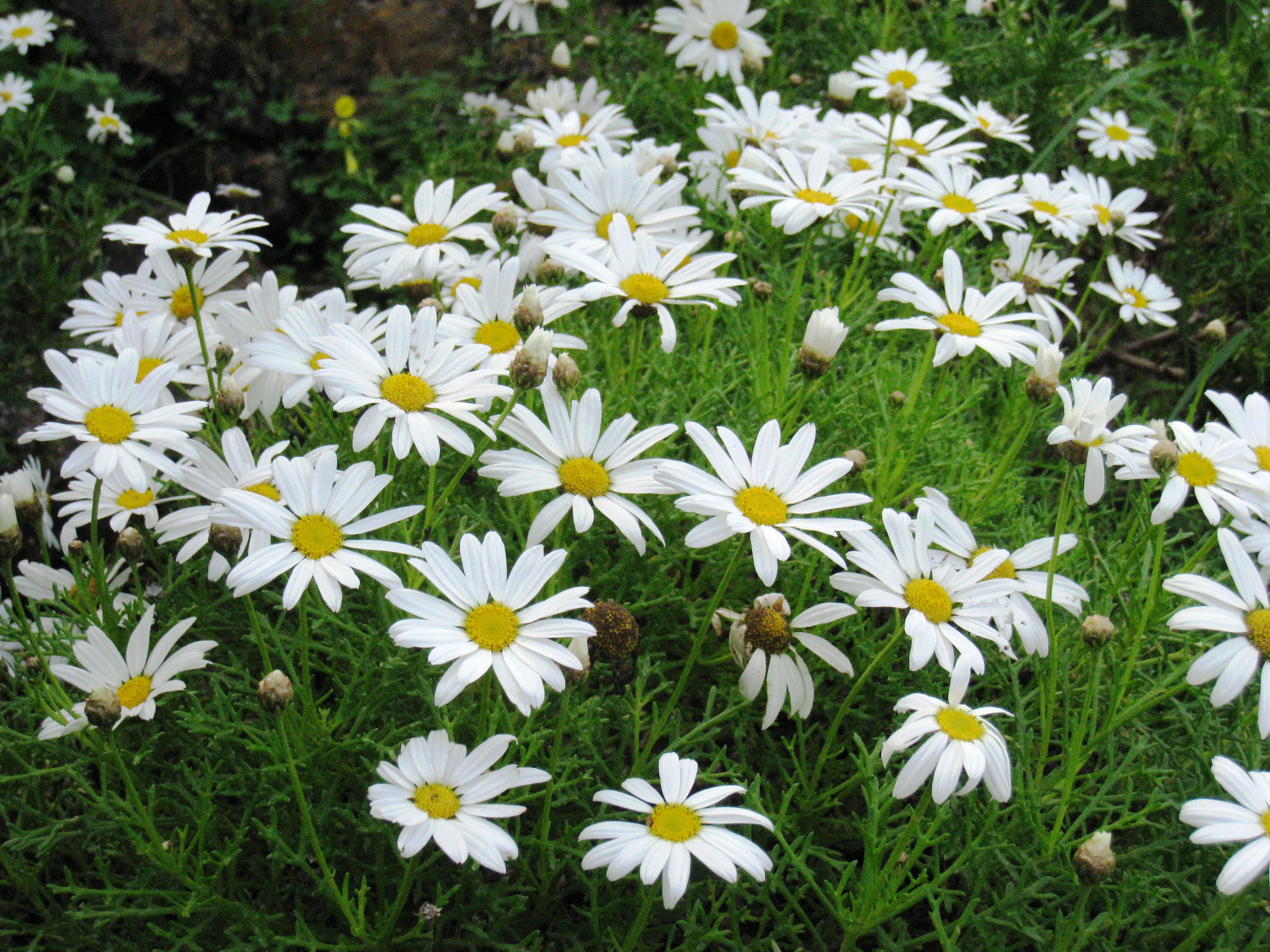

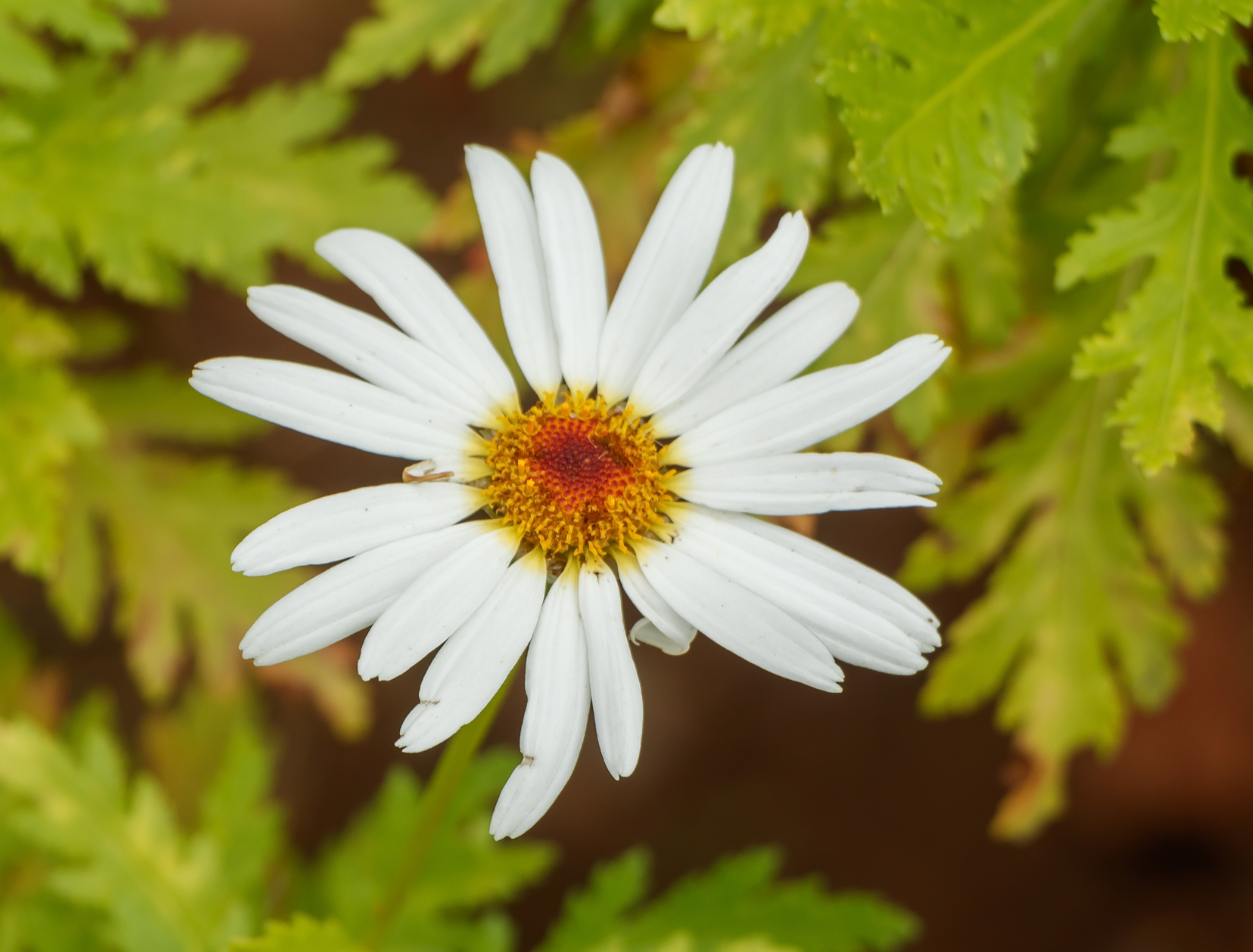
Argyranthemum haematomma

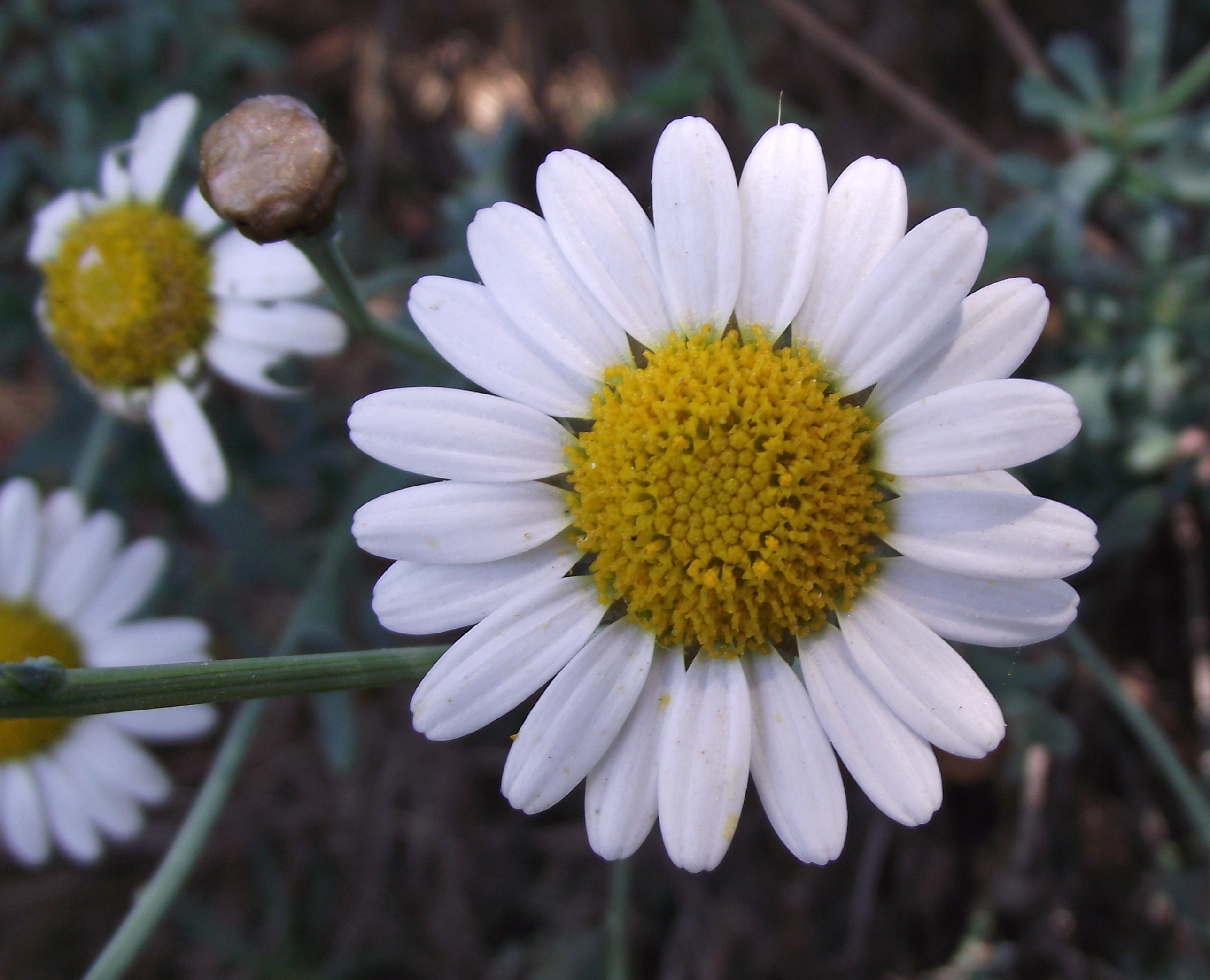

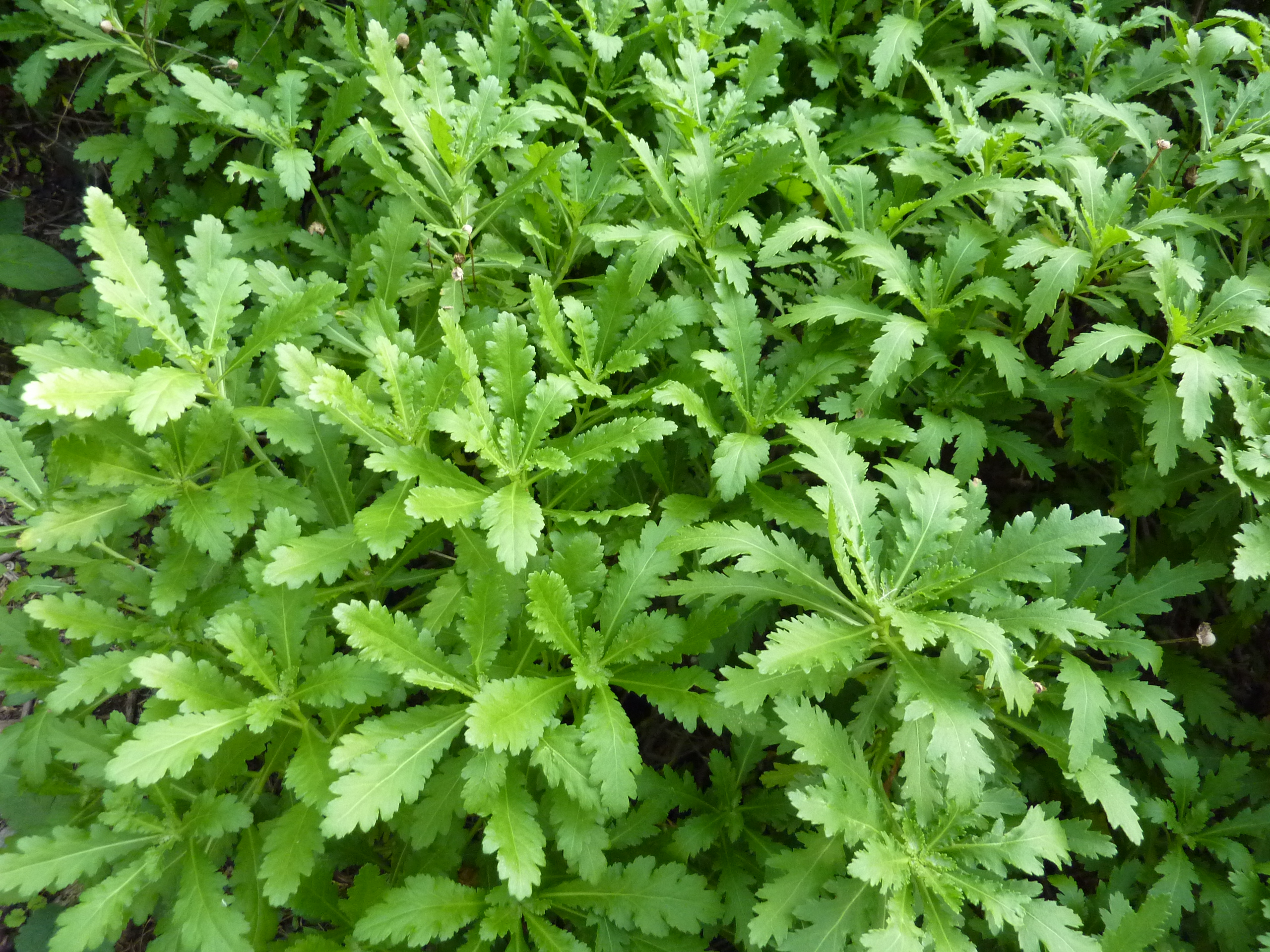
