= John Law's Company =

French joint-stock company

Mississippi Company
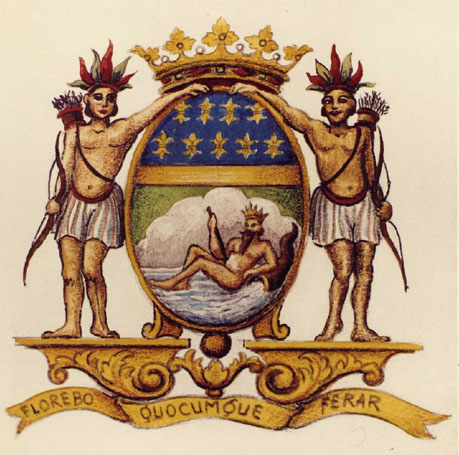
- Coat of arms of the Indies Company, with the reclining figure representing the Mississippi River taken from Law's Compagnie d'Occident, and the motto Florebo quocumque ferar taken from Louis XIV's East India Company
- Type: Public
- Industry: Conglomerate
- Predecessor: Louis XIV's East India Company
- Founded: 1717
- Founder: John Law
- Defunct: 1723
- Successor: French Indies Company
- Subsidiaries: John Law's Bank

John Law's Company, founded in 1717 by Scottish economist and financier John Law, was a joint-stock company that was briefly granted the entire revenue-raising capacity of the French state. It also absorbed all previous French chartered colonial companies and was popularly known as the Compagnie du Mississippi (Mississippi Company), even though under Law's leadership its overseas operations remained secondary to its domestic financial activity.

In February 1720, the company acquired John Law's Bank, which had been France's first central bank. The experiment was short-lived, and after a stock market collapse of the company's shares in the second half of 1720 (the Mississippi Bubble), the company was placed under government receivership in April 1721. It emerged from that process in 1723 as the French Indies Company, focused on what had been the overseas operations of Law's Company.

== Name ==
Law's Company was formally known, first, as the Compagnie d'Occident (lit. 'Company of the West') from August 1717 to May 1719, then as the Compagnie des Indes (lit. 'Company of the Indies'). It was also popularly referred to as the Compagnie du Mississippi (lit. 'Mississippi Company').

The company was at the center of the broader monetary and fiscal scheme known as Law's System (French: le système de Law). Initially the System's main entity was Law's Bank, but the System and the Company became practically synonymous after the Bank was merged into the Company in February 1720.

== Background ==
The territory of Louisiana was originally claimed for the Kingdom of France by René Cavelier de La Salle on 9 April 1682, then including all the drainage basin of the Mississippi River (which La Salle called the Colbert River, in honor of Jean-Baptiste Colbert). The first attempt to establish a joint-stock company to develop the territory was made in 1697, but did not succeed. Other attempts failed between 1708 and 1710.

Prominent Parisian financier Antoine Crozat, who already controlled the Compagnie de Guinée and the associated slave trade, eventually established a Company of Louisiana (French: Compagnie de la Louisiane) that was granted a 15-year trading monopoly in the territory by Louis XIV on 14 September 1712. Crozat had been persuaded to engage in this venture by adventurer Antoine de la Mothe Cadillac, whom he appointed to lead the company. The company's activity remained limited, however, and Crozat withdrew in early 1717 after being fined by the Chamber of Justice that had been established by Adrien Maurice de Noailles, 3rd Duke of Noailles to castigate financiers associated with the financial recklessness of Louis XIV's late years. By then, Louisiana remained almost entirely undeveloped, with a total population of French colonists numbering only about 500.

== Compagnie d'Occident ==
The Regency Council approved a proposal from Noailles to approve Law's company on 21 August 1717, and letters patent were issued the following week. They granted the Company all of Louisiana as a fief in perpetuity (i.e., the Company was the vassal of the King for Louisiana), and added a 25-year monopoly on trading between Louisiana and the French mainland as well as on the beaver fur trade in Canada. They allowed the Company to have its own military force, to make treaties with native Americans, and to benefit from French military assistance in conflicts with other European powers. At the end of the initial 25-year period, the Company would retain ownership of Louisiana but would sell any military assets to the King, including forts and equipment. The company was granted a coat of arms displaying a male allegory of the Mississippi River, leaning on a cornucopia.

After some nudging by the Regent, the Parlement of Paris registered the edict on 10 September 1717, and the King appointed Law as Director-General two days later. The shares were offered at 500 livres face value, payable entirely in government debt bills at par (which was highly advantageous, as with the initial subscription for Law's Bank). The subscription was open to the nobility but also to commoners and foreigners. The public offering started on 14 September 1717 and extended until the end of 1718, for a total 100 million French livres at face value. Depending on accounts, it appears that Law himself subscribed between 10 million and 13.3 million livres (or 10-13.3 percent of the total), and the French state (namely the Regent, the King and four favored servants) subscribed between 30 and 40 million.

The Company soon started building up its operations. It appointed Jean-Baptiste Le Moyne de Bienville as commandant-general of Louisiana's armed forces, who in the spring of 1718 started developing a new settlement which took the name New Orleans in honor of the Regent. By December 1718, it owned a dozen ships and had made several voyages to Louisiana. It soon engaged in a series of acquisitions of tax farming rights and other colonial companies. These included the right to run the Ferme du tabac, France's tobacco monopoly, on 1 August 1718, and the Compagnie du Sénégal, on 4 December 1718. The company held its first annual general meeting in the Hôtel de Mesmes, the seat of Law's Bank on rue Sainte-Avoye, on 27 March 1719 with the Regent as chair and 300 shareholders in attendance.

== Compagnie des Indes ==
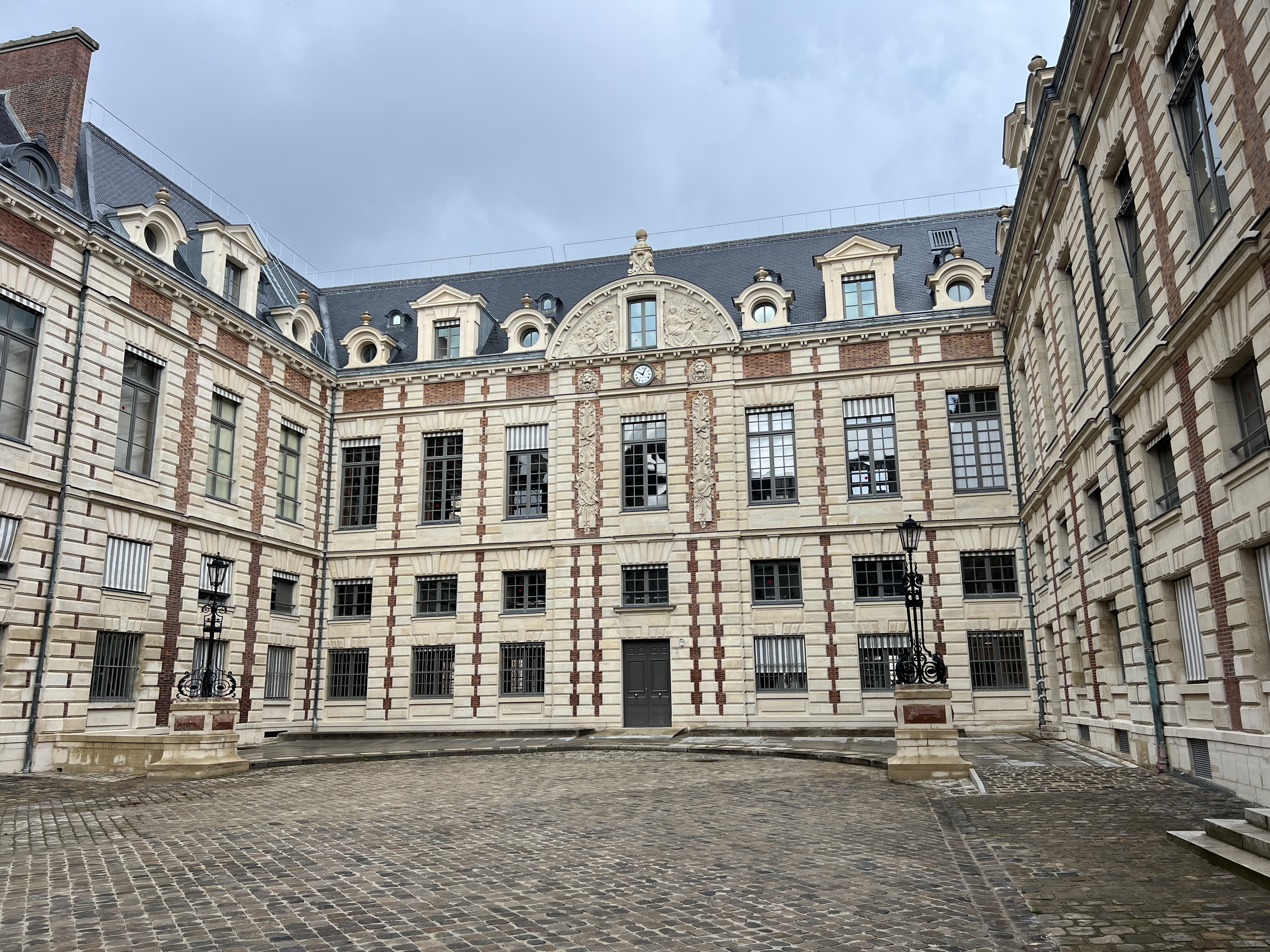
Hôtel Tubeuf in Paris, seat of the Indies Company from 1720

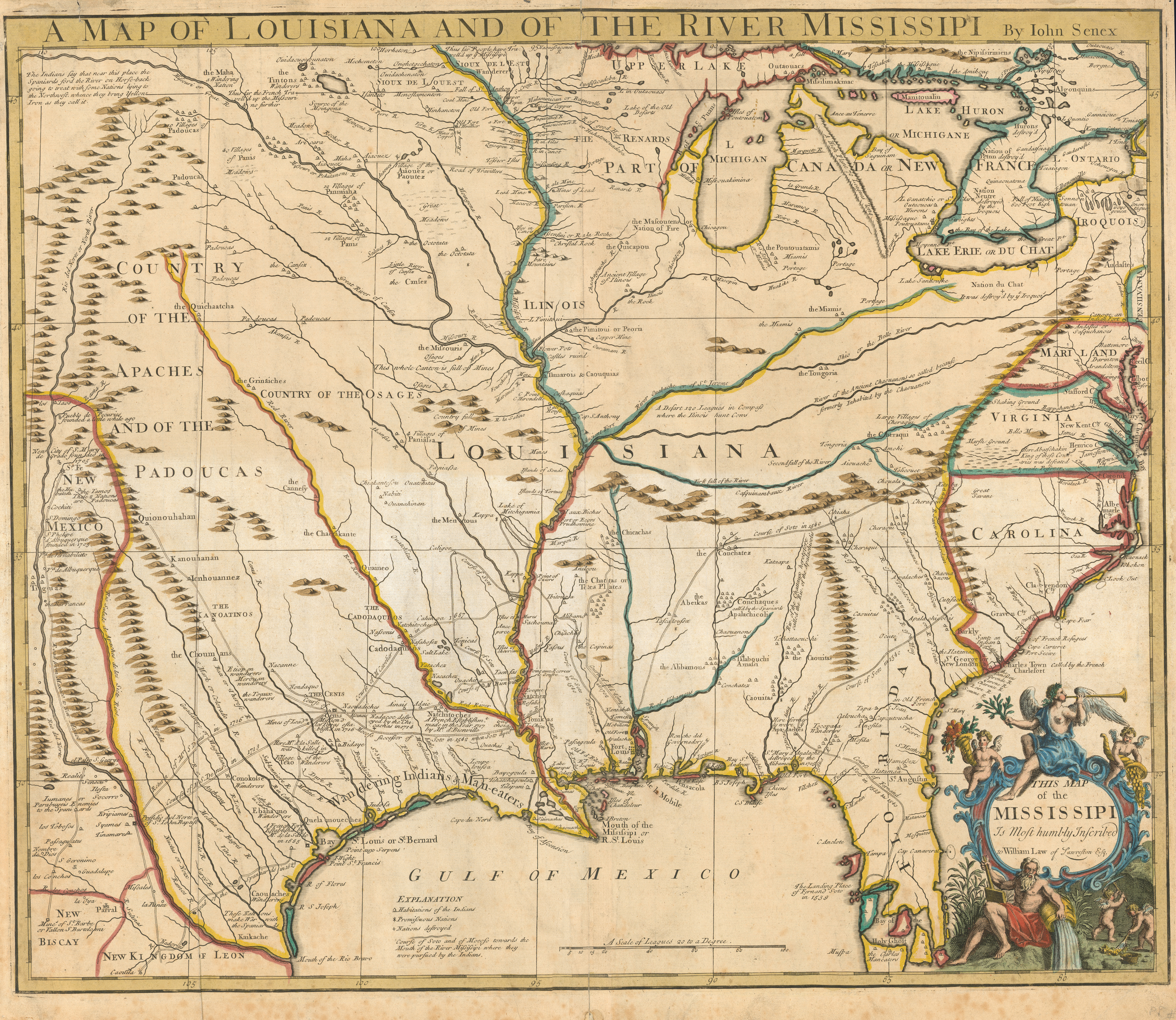
John Senex's map of Louisiana (1721) with a dedication to William Law, possibly John Law's brother

In May 1719, Law expanded his acquisition spree by purchasing the long-bankrupt East Indies Company, as well as the Compagnie de la Chine that had been relaunched in 1712. The Compagnie d'Occident reimbursed the two companies' debts and financed the acquisition by issuing new shares underwritten by Law 's Bank, illustrating the growing synergy between the two ventures. On 21 May 1719, a royal edict issued by the Regent endorsed the transaction and gave the name Compagnie des Indes to the merged entity. Among other things, this gave Law's company for the first time its own harbour, shipyard and arsenal in mainland France at Lorient, which had been developed by the East Indies Company since 1666. The company ambitiously developed the facilities at Lorient, which had stagnated in the previous few decades.

That expansion of the company's geographical scope, by triggering the issuance of new shares, also marked the start of a momentous rise in the value of the shares, which until then had stayed around their par level of 500 livres. The shares were traded in the open-air market in a section of rue Quincampoix in Paris, which had developed in the late years of Louis XIV's reign first as a trading venue for discounted state debt bills. The price reached 750 livres on 17 June, 1,000 livres on 21 July, 2,000 livres the following week, and 3,000 livres on 17 August. The full sequence of acquisitions during the heated summer of 1719 included:

- the privilege on trade with North Africa previously held by the Compagnie d'Afrique and Compagnie du Cap-Nègre, in June–July 1719
- the right to run all royal mints for nine years, on 25 July 1719
- the right to run the ferme générales for nine years, which collected most excise taxes, on 27 August 1719
- the rights to collect all direct taxes, also in late August 1719.

The latter two were part of a broader set of transactions that made Law's Company the collector of all taxes and owner of all debt owed to and by the French kingdom, while still being technically a joint-stock company. Simultaneously, its privileges were extended to last a full half-century to 1 January 1770.

The company remained profitable and solvent until the collapse of the bubble. Its value temporarily soared to the equivalent of $6.5 trillion today, which would make it the second most valuable company in history behind the Dutch East India Company. The popularity of company shares was such that they sparked a need for more paper bank notes, and when shares generated profits the investors were paid out in paper bank notes. On 30 December 1719, Law's Company held its second general meeting, still at the Hôtel de Mesmes with 1,200 shareholders attending as well as the Regent; his eldest son Louis; Louis Henri, Duke of Bourbon; and other grandees. In early 1720, the Company relocated to the Hôtel de Nevers, which Law had purchased in 1719 with the intent to donate it to the company.

== Operations in America ==
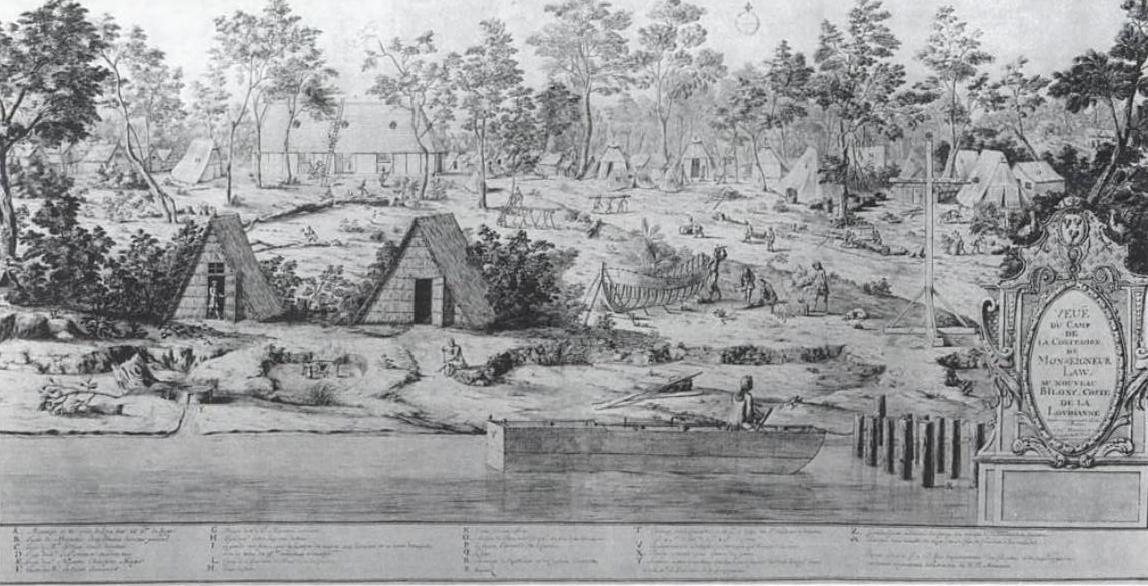
The Company's outpost at Biloxi, December 1720

Bénard de la Harpe and his party left New Orleans in 1719 to explore the Red River. In 1721, he explored the Arkansas River. At the Yazoo settlements in Mississippi he was joined by Jean Benjamin who became the scientist for the expedition. The Mississippi Company arranged ships to bring in 800 more settlers, who landed in Louisiana in 1718, doubling the European population. Law encouraged some German-speaking people, including Alsatians and Swiss, to emigrate. They gave their names to the German Coast and the Lac des Allemands in Louisiana.

Prisoners were deported from Paris to Mississippi beginning in September 1719, and encouraged by Law to marry young women recruited in hospitals. In May 1720, after complaints from the Mississippi Company and the concessioners about this class of French immigrants, the French government prohibited such deportations. However, there was a third shipment of prisoners in 1721.

The company was involved in the Atlantic slave trade, importing African slaves along the Mississippi River to points as far north as modern Illinois.

== Collapse and aftermath ==
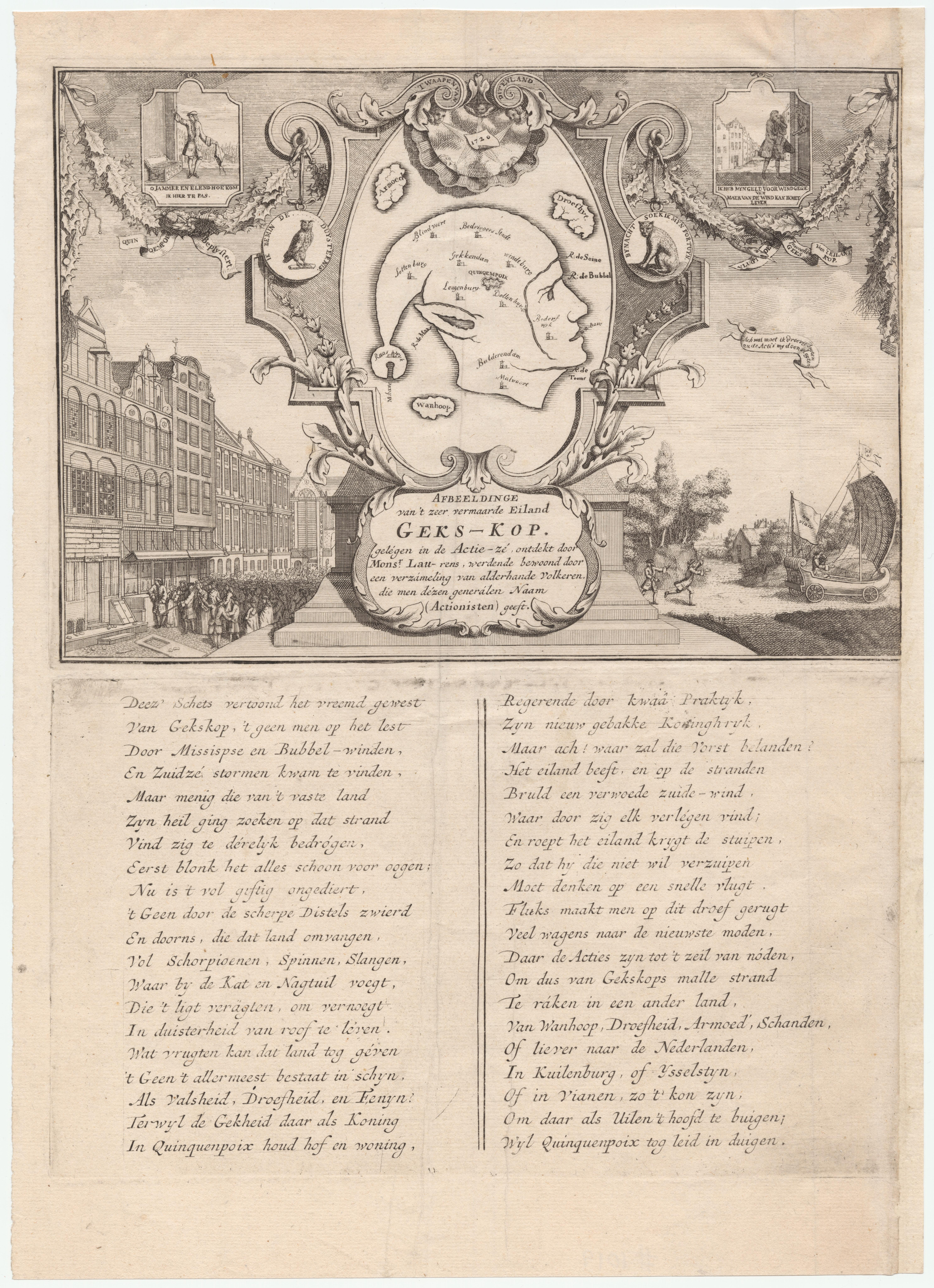
Satirical cartoon from 1720, the text in the centre reads: "Representation of the very famous island of Mad-head, lying in the sea of shares, discovered by Mr. Law-rens, and inhabited by a collection of all kinds of people, to whom are given the general name shareholders"

The market price of company shares eventually reached the peak of 10,000 livres. As the shareholders were selling their shares, the money supply in France suddenly doubled, and inflation burgeoned. Inflation reached a monthly rate of 23% in January 1720. The company further purchased the Banque Royale, in February 1720, and the Compagnie de Saint-Domingue and the monopoly on France's slave trade, in September 1720.

The "bubble" burst at the end of 1720. By September 1720 the price of shares in the company had fallen to 2,000 livres and to 1,000 by December. By September 1721 share prices had dropped to 500 livres, where they had been at the beginning.

By the end of 1720, Philippe d'Orléans had dismissed Law from his positions. Law then fled France for Brussels, eventually moving on to Venice, where his livelihood was gambling. He was buried in the church San Moisè in Venice.

The Company, together with the bank it owned and managed, was placed in receivership in April 1721. It emerged from that process in March 1723,, by which time all its operations were in Overseas trading and colonial development. As part of the restructuring, the French state paid the company an indemnity of 514 million livres to make it whole, and it kept its prior shareholders; its trading and navigation privileges were confirmed by a series of royal edicts in June 1725 which closed the restructuring. It kept operating as the French Indies Company until eventual liquidation in 1770.

== See also ==
- Richard Cantillon – banker who made an early profit from the company
- South Sea Bubble
- John Law (novel), a 1864 novel by William Henry Ainsworth depicting the rise and fall of the company
- List of French colonial trading companies
- List of chartered companies
