= French Indies Company =

Early modern colonial company

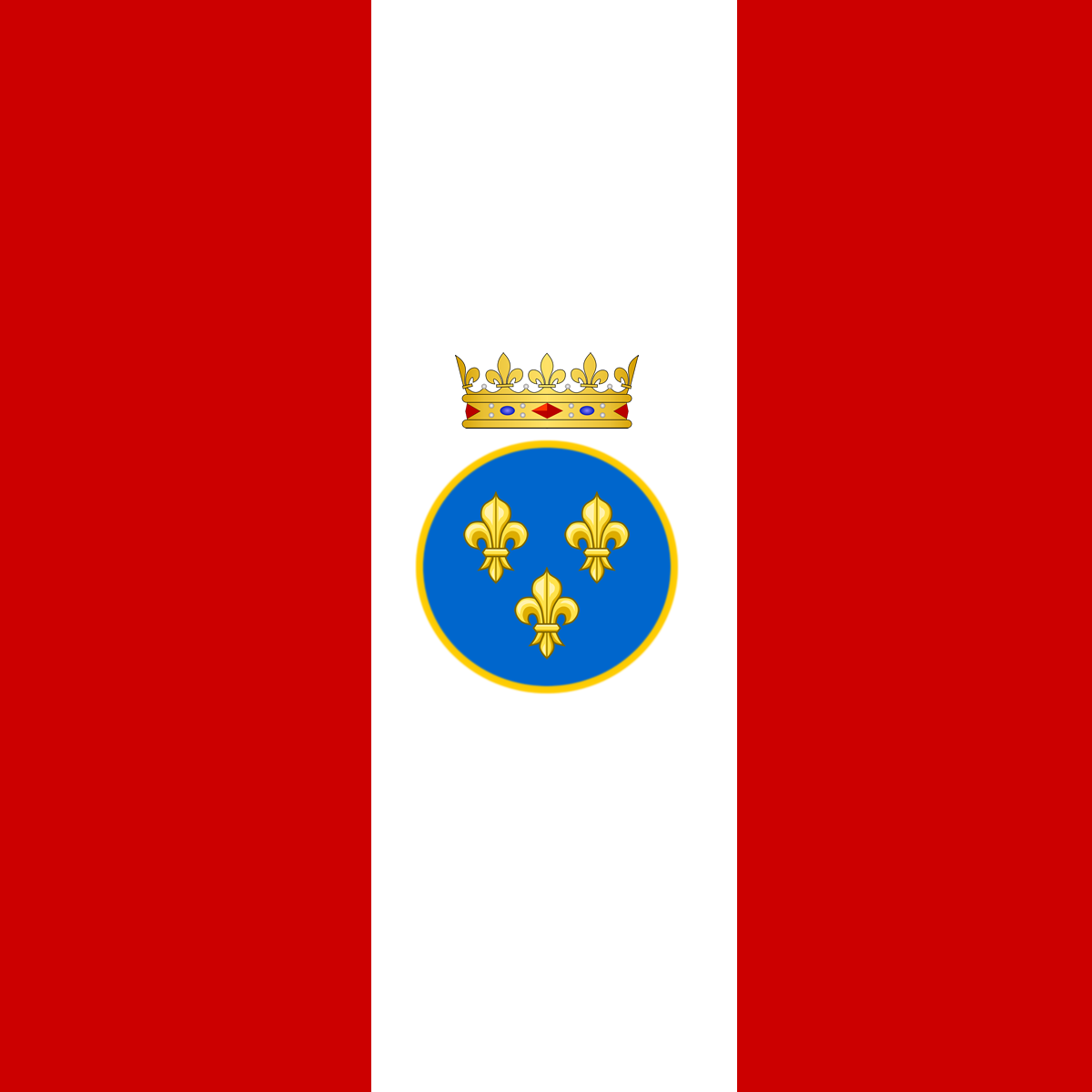
- Company flag

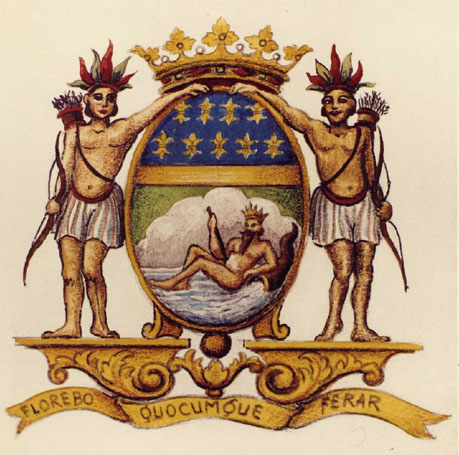
- Coat of arms Motto: Florebo quocumque ferar Latin for "I will flourish wherever I will be brought"
- Native name: Compagnie française des Indes
- Type: Public; State-owned enterprise
- Industry: Trade
- Predecessor: Mississippi Company
- Founded: 1723
- Fate: liquidated 1770
- Headquarters: Lorient

The French Indies Company or French East Indies Company (French: Compagnie française des Indes orientales) was the main French overseas trading company during most of Louis XV's long reign in the 18th century. It emerged in March 1723 from the reorganization of John Law's Company following the termination of John Law's giant monetary experiment which the company had channelled. The company represented the France's first and longest-standing international monopoly over colonial trade for almost two centuries. As a delayed consequence of the Seven Years' War, the company's privilege was eventually withdrawn in 1769, and the company was liquidated the next year.

== Overview ==
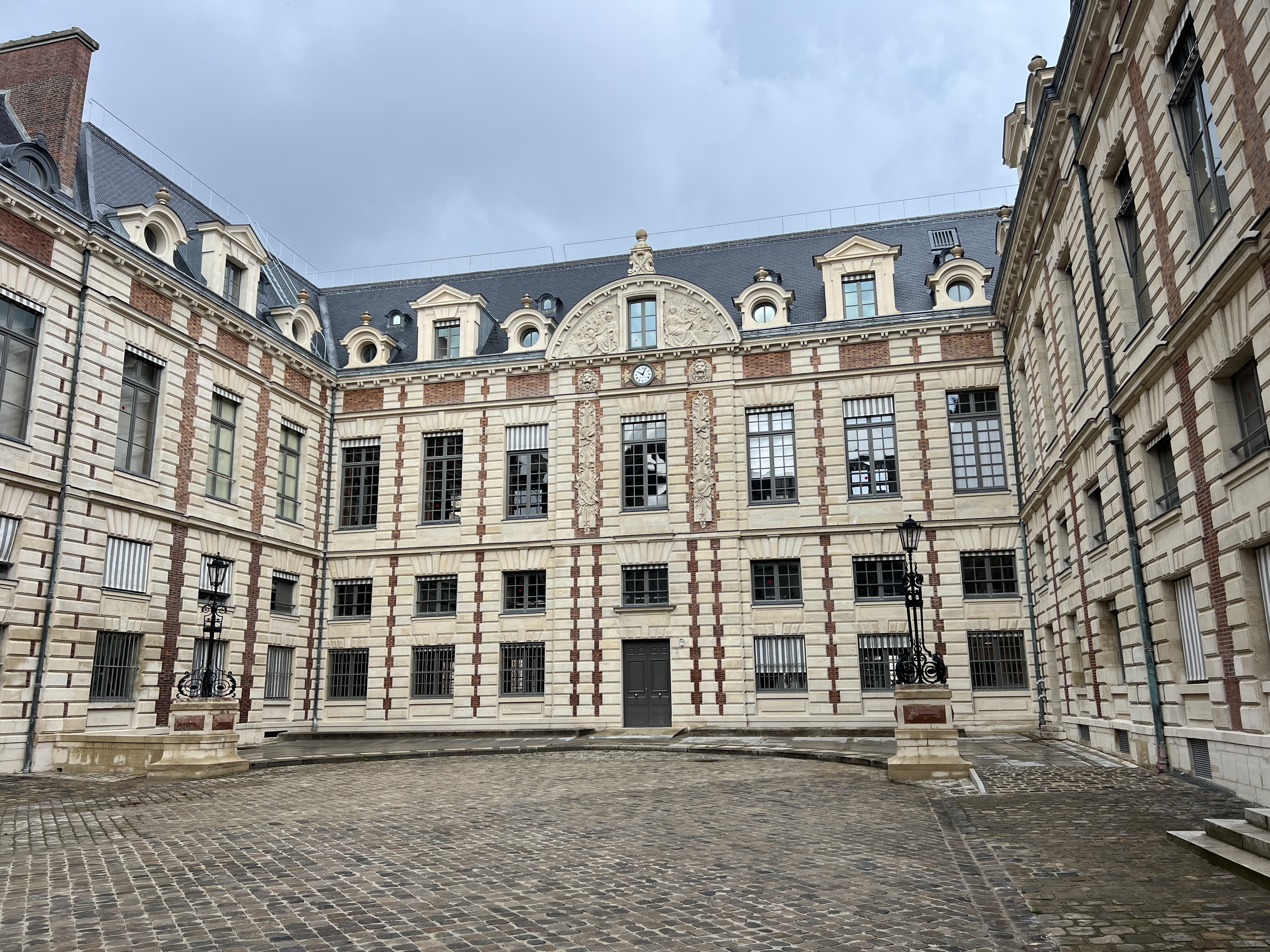
Former Parisian seat of the French Indies Company at Hôtel Tubeuf

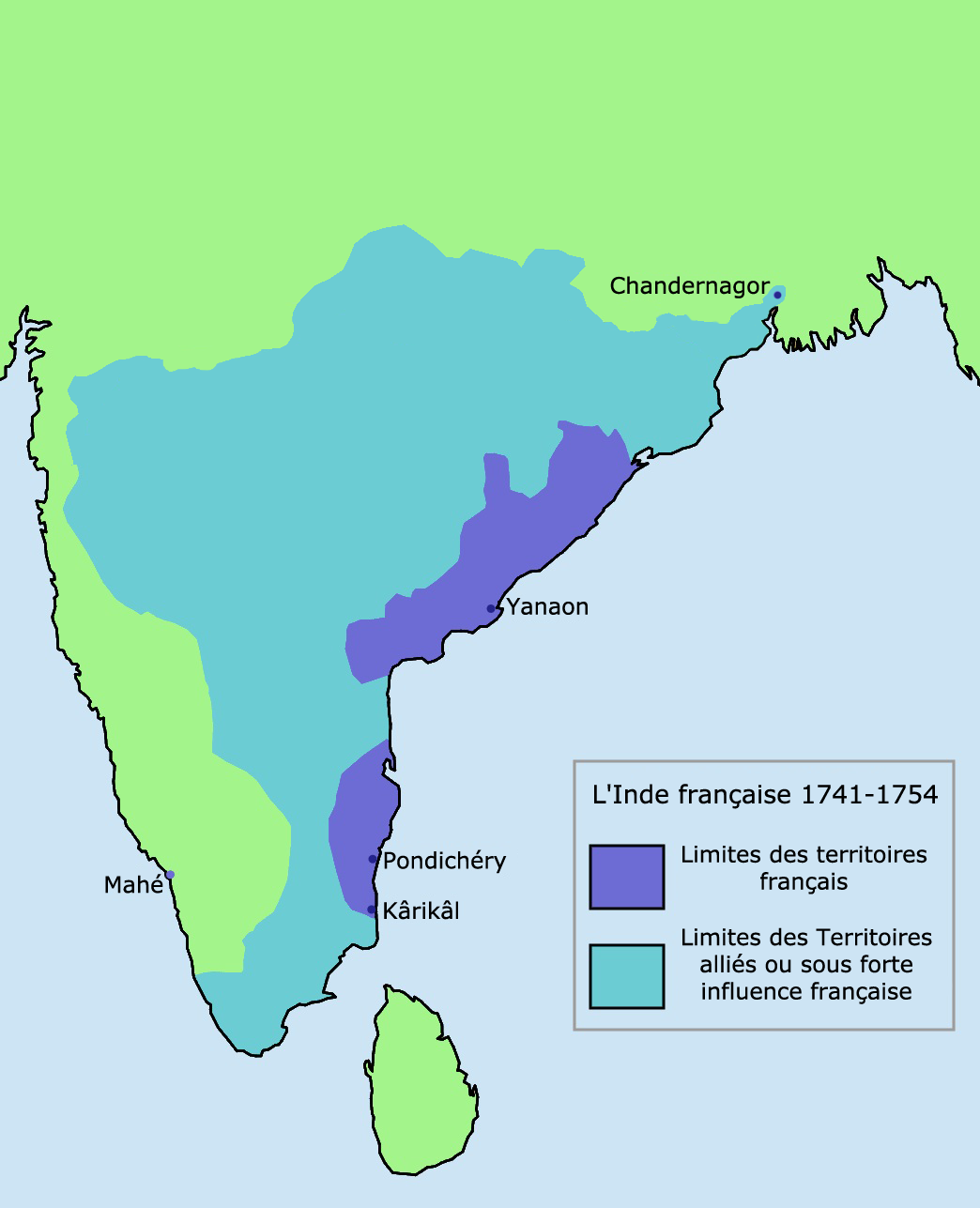
French presence in India 1741–1754

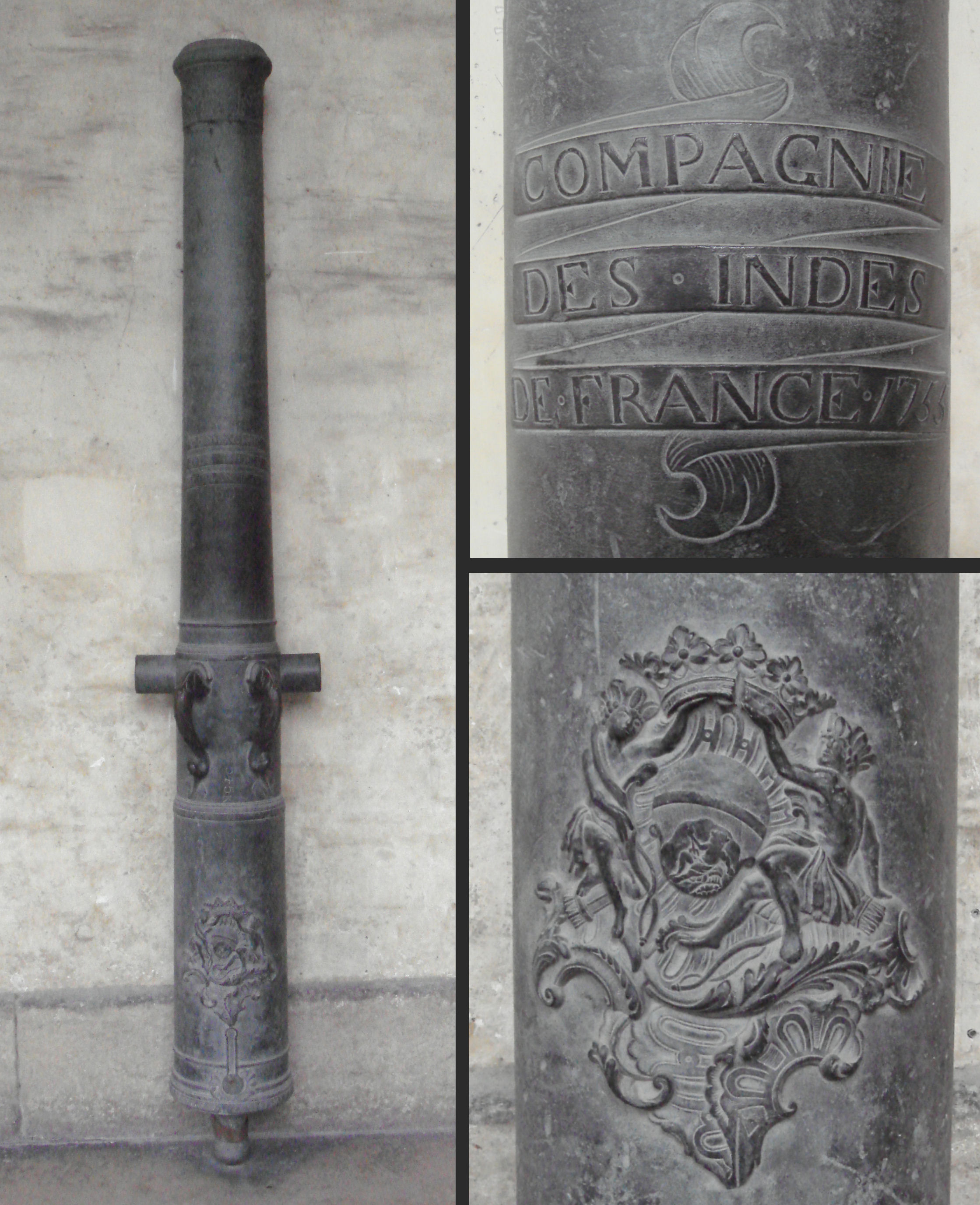
French Indies Company cannon ("Canon de 4"), 1755, kept in Douai

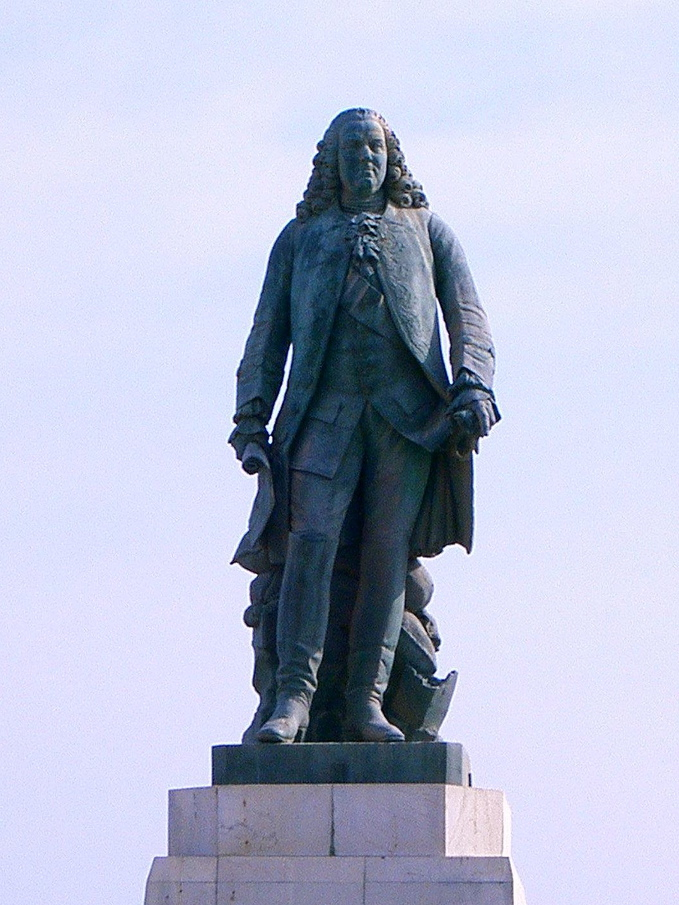
Dupleix Monument in Pondicherry

While born from John Law's Company, the Indies Company kept none of the former's monetary and fiscal role in mainland France. In June-July 1725, a series of royal edicts cleared it of any residual liability for Law's System and confirmed its overseas trading and colonial privileges, except for the Atlantic slave trade towards Saint-Domingue. The company's founding is attributed to the French finance minister, Jean-Baptiste Colbert, who established the company through the Royal Charter of 1664, as part of strategy to break Dutch and English dominance over Asian trade routes. In comparison with its English and Dutch counterpart, the Compagnie had a dual personality, which the historian Louis Dermigny referred to as "Versailles of trade". This duality involved the replication of the Dutch prototype and the expression of the French order of unity and authority.

The company's dynamic development, particularly after 1731, is credited to the initiative of comptroller-general Philibert Orry. He streamlined its ownership structure, governance and portfolio of operations, which focused on Asian trade. By then, the king was the company's main owner and appointed its leadership. As part of Orry's restructuring, the company lost its privileges and monopolies in the trade with North Africa (November 1730) and Louisiana (January 1731), but kept them for Canada, Senegal and Guinea. Its sales of tea, coffee, spices, cotton goods, and silks increased from 7 million pounds in 1725 to 14 million in 1735 and over 20 million in 1750. By then it had annual sales in the range 21-25 million French livres, similar as those of the British East India Company and not very far from the Dutch East India Company, its foremost rivals, since the latter's annual revenue was estimated around 30 million livres.

By 1738, the company owned 1,432 enslaved people, 630 of whom were on the colony of Isle de France. Many captives in the colony were imported by the company from the West African region of Senegambia; these included laptots, enslaved African sailors who served on board the company's ships.

With the decline of the Mughal Empire, the company decided to intervene in Indian political affairs to protect French interests, notably by forging alliances with local rulers in south India. From 1741, under Joseph François Dupleix, it pursued an aggressive policy against both the local rulers and its British rivals, until ultimately defeated by Robert Clive during the Seven Years' War. With the Treaty of Paris (1763), the territories were returned to France.

The company was not able to maintain itself financially. It lost its monopolies on the Canadian beaver fur trade and on trade with Senegal in February 1763, and on trade with Guinea in July 1767. Its Asian trade privilege was suspended on 13 August 1769, and king Louis XV required the company to transfer to the state all its properties, assets and rights, which were valued at 30 million livres. The King agreed to pay all of the company's debts and obligations, though holders of company stock and notes received only an estimated 15 percent of the face value of their investments by the end of the corporate liquidation process in 1790.

== Money issuance ==
The Indies Company was granted the right to issue currency in its Indian establishments.

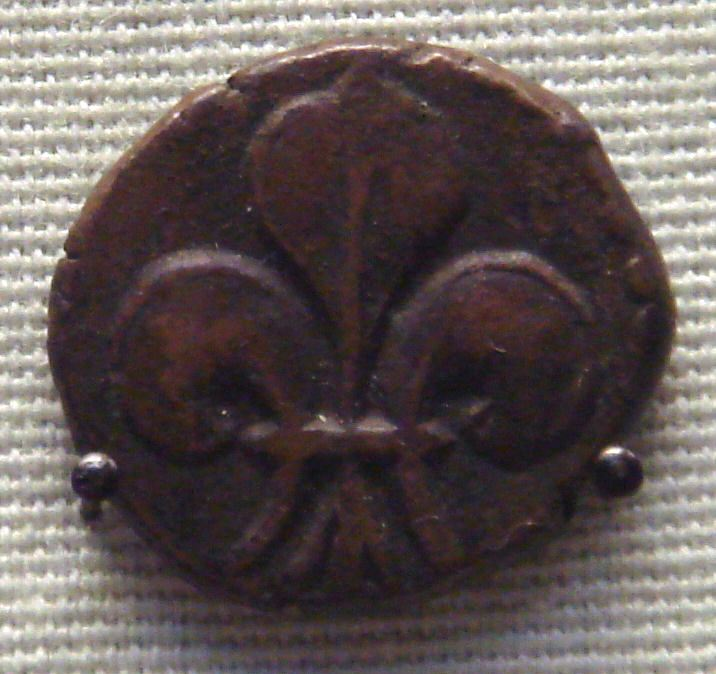
French-issued copper coin, minted in Pondichéry, used for internal Indian trade.

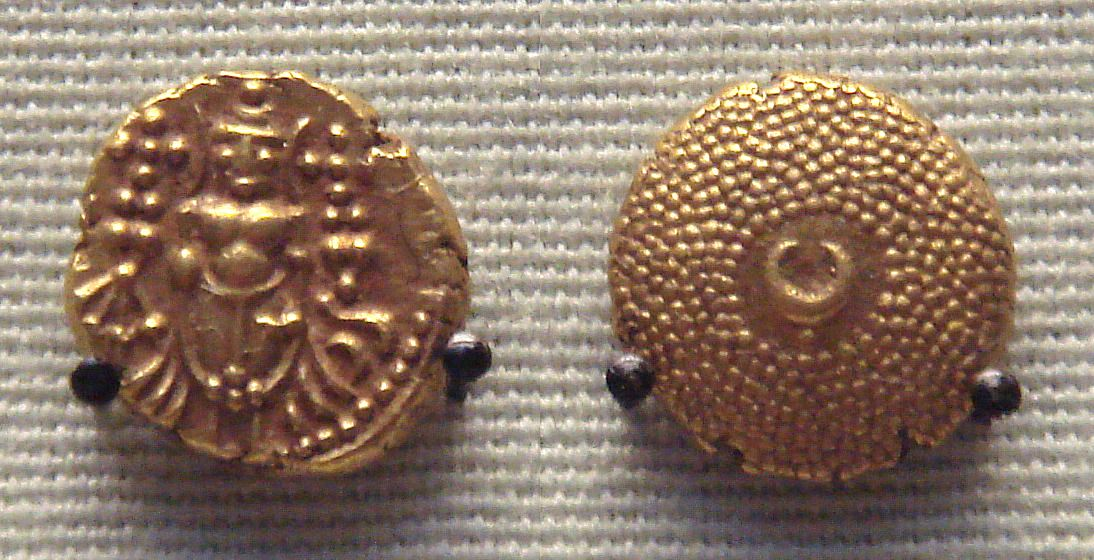
French-issued "Gold Pagoda" for Southern India trade, cast in Pondichéry 1705–1780.

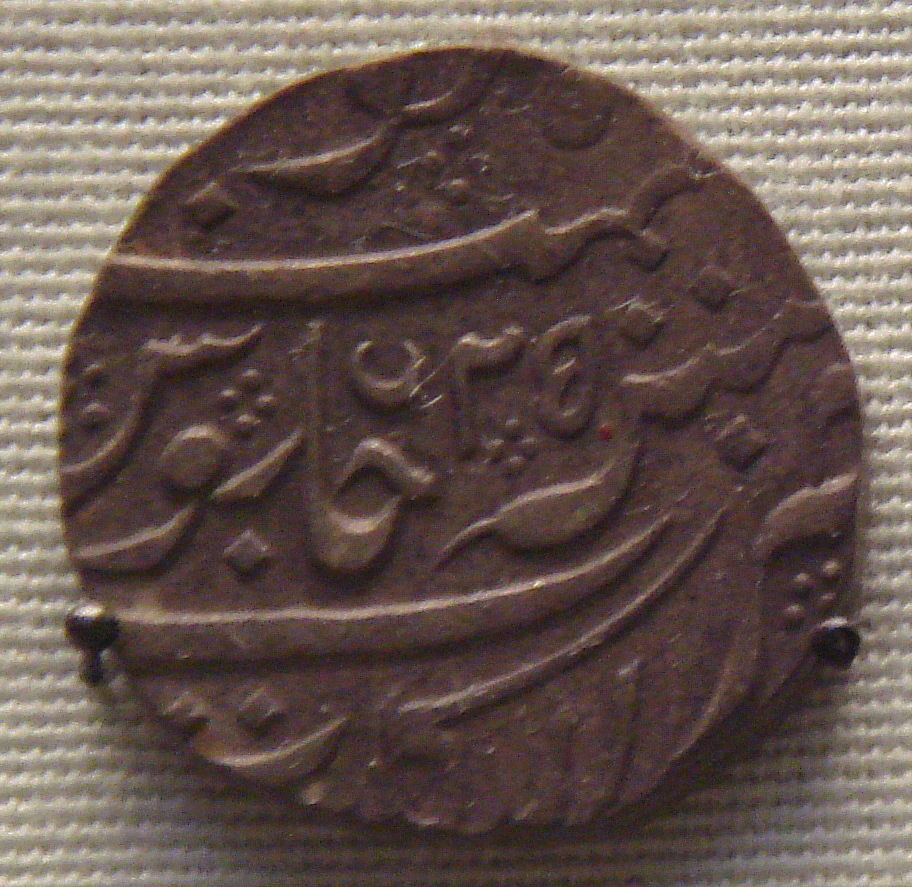
French-issued rupee in the name of Mohammed Shah (1719–1748) for Northern India trade, cast in Pondichéry.

== See also ==
- Carnatic Wars
- Chanda Sahib
- France-Asia relations
- French colonial empire
- French India
- Compagnie de Calonne
- List of chartered companies
