= First French East Indies Company =

Early modern colonial venture

The first French East Indies Company (French: Compagnie française des Indes orientales), sometimes referred to as the Company de Dieppe or Compagnie Le Roy et Godefroy, was the first of several attempts by the Kingdom of France to charter a trading company to compete with the English East India Company (est. 1600) and Dutch East India Company (est. 1602). It was in existence between 1604 and 1615, when it was replaced by a successor venture, the Company of the Moluccas (French: Compagnie des Moluques). None of these endeavors proved durably impactful.

== Compagnie Le Roy et Godefroy ==
In June 1604, King Henry IV of France authorized the establishment of the Compagnie française des Indes Orientales, granting the new firm a 15-year monopoly on French trade with the East Indies. Intended at one point to be based in Brest, the company was entrusted to traders from Dieppe assisted by a Flemish captain, Gérard Le Roy, and a financier, Antoine Godefroy, treasurer of France in Limoges.

The company did not succeed in undertaking the intended commercial activity, however, and not a single ship sailed for it. Following Henry's assassination in 1610, the charter was renewed in 1611 for a period of 12 years. The company remained inactive during the troubles of the regency of Marie de' Medici, and other cities such as Rouen manoeuvred to also obtain trading rights.

== Compagnie des Moluques ==
In July 1615, Marie de' Medici caused the different parties to be joined into the Company of the Moluccas. The company received trading privileges for the Far East for a period of 18 years.

In 1616, two expeditions were dispatched to Asia from Honfleur in Normandy: three ships left for India, and two ships for Bantam. One ship returned from Bantam in 1617 with a small cargo, and letters from the Dutch expressing their hostility towards French ships in the East Indies. Also in 1616, two ships were sent from Saint-Malo to Java. One was captured by the Dutch, but the other obtained an agreement from the ruler of Pondicherry to build a fortress and a factory there, and came back with a rich cargo.

One of the main enterprises of the Company of the Moluccas was the armed expedition of Augustin de Beaulieu in 1619–1622. This was composed of three ships (275 crew, 106 cannons) was sent from Honfleur, to fight the Dutch in the Far East. They encountered the Dutch fleet off Sumatra. One ship was captured, another remained in Asia for inter-country trade, and the third returned to Le Havre in 1622.

In 1624, the Treaty of Compiègne was negotiated by French Cardinal Richelieu and Dutch ambassadors. It agreed that French and Dutch forces would cease fighting in the Far East.

== Aftermath ==
In 1642, Richelieu created the Compagnie d'Orient, which created France's first small trading establishments in the Indian Ocean at Madagascar, Réunion, and Mauritius. Eventually, the baton of France's ambitions in the Indo-Pacific was granted in 1664 by Jean-Baptiste Colbert to a newly formed French East India Company, with much greater financial resources provided by the French state, but that effort also failed to establish French dominance of Europe's long-distance commerce.

== See also ==
- France-Asia relations
- List of French colonial trading companies
- List of chartered companies
