= Louis XIV's East India Company =

French trading company (1664–1794)

Louis XIV's East India Company (French: Compagnie des Indes orientales French pronunciation: [kɔ̃paɲi dez‿ɛ̃d ɔʁjɑ̃tal]) was a joint-stock company founded in the Kingdom of France in August 1664 to engage in trade in India and other Asian lands, complementing the French West India Company (French: Compagnie des Indes occidentales) created three months before. It was one of several successive enterprises with similar names, a sequence started with Henry IV's first French East Indies Company in 1604 and continued with Cardinal Richelieu's Compagnie d'Orient in 1642. Planned by Jean-Baptiste Colbert to compete with the English East India Company and Dutch East India Company, it was chartered by King Louis XIV for the purpose of trading in the Eastern Hemisphere.

Louis XIV's company became insolvent and was reorganized in 1685, and was again bankrupt in 1706. In 1719, what remained of it was acquired by John Law's Company, which in 1723 became the French Indies Company active during much of the 18th century.

== Background ==
The seventeenth century saw several French efforts to trade with the East Indies, starting with the first French East Indies Company (1604-1614). They were influenced by the successful business ventures of the Dutch East India Company. Between the 1630s and early 1660s, French efforts were smaller in scale, but they enjoyed some success. French merchant ships traversed the Persian Gulf, Red Sea, and the northwestern coast of the Indian subcontinent. These accomplishments, however, paled in comparison with those of England and the Dutch Republic. France's Atlantic ports competed with each other. The commercial and financial expertise concentrated around the coastal regions of Brittany and Normandy.

== History ==
At its foundation on 27 August 1664, the new company absorbed the earlier operations of the Compagnie d'Orient as well as those of the Compagnie de Chine (est. 1660) and Compagnie de Madagascar (est. mid-1650s in Port-Louis, Morbihan). Its initial capital of the East India Company was 15 million livres, divided into shares of 1000 livres apiece. Louis XIV funded the first 3 million livres of investment, against which losses in the first 10 years were to be charged. Additional state support was provided in the form of subsidies indexed to trading volume, 20-percent subsidization of the investment expenditure to create overseas ports, and free military protection. The company was led by a central board of 12 directors (French: chambre générale) based in Paris, complemented by four chambres particulières de province in Bordeaux, Lyon, Nantes, and Rouen.

The company was granted a 50-year monopoly on French navigation and trade in the Indian and Pacific Oceans, a region stretching from the Cape of Good Hope eastward all the way to the Strait of Magellan. In 1666, it was granted a base in Lorient, where it permanently relocated its operations previously in Le Havre in 1670.

Louis granted the company a concession in perpetuity for the island of Madagascar, as well as any other territories it might conquer. The underlying intent was to establish a French entrepôt in Madagascar to rival the Dutch colony of Batavia, but that plan was never realistic and the company gave up on it in 1668. Another motivation that interfered with the company's commercial activity was to promote the expansion of the Catholic faith, materialized in an early agreement made in 1665 by the company with the recently established Paris Foreign Missions Society by which the latter's missionaries were granted free travel on the company's ships.

After abandoning the Madagascar project, the company endeavored to establish a foothold in the Mughal Empire, which had long awarded facilities to the Portuguese Empire and other European ventures. Already on 4 September 1666, an embassy sent by Louis XIV had secured a mandate from Emperor Aurangzeb that granted the company rights to trade in the major Mughal port of Surat, with similar customs privileges as the Dutch and English. In 1673, the company established an outpost in Pondicherry, then in 1688 in Chandernagor.

The company's operations were heavily hampered by its bureaucratic governance and political interference. It was never able to send more than five ships a year, against 10 to 25 ships sent annually by its Dutch competitor. By the 1680s, the company went insolvent and they had little choice but to rent out its monopoly to a group of merchants. On 6 January 1682, a decree of Louis XIV allowed private merchants to trade in the East on board the company's ships. In 1685, the company was drastically restructured, and its governance further nationalized as the directors were henceforth chosen by the king among the shareholders instead of being elected, and the regional chambers were abolished. Its activity further declined in the late 17th century, as Louis XIV's wars drained the kingdom of resources for any long-term projects. During that period and after its renewed bankruptcy in 1706, French commerce in Asia was mostly undertaken by private entrepreneurs, many of them from Saint-Malo.

== Leadership ==
The first director general for the company was François de La Faye de La Martinie, who was adjoined by two directors belonging to the two most successful trading organizations at that time: François Caron, who had spent 30 years working for the Dutch East India Company including in Japan from 1619 to 1641, and Marcara Avanchintz, an Armenian trader from Isfahan, Persia.

== See also ==
- English East India Company, est. 1600
- Dutch East India Company, est. 1602
- Danish East India Company, est. 1616
- Portuguese East India Company, est. 1628
- France-Asia relations
- French colonial empire
- French India
- List of chartered companies
