= 1720s =

Decade

The 1720s decade ran from January 1, 1720, to December 31, 1729. In Europe it was a decade of comparative peace following a lengthy period of near continuous warfare with treaties ending the War of the Quadruple Alliance and the Great Northern War. Both Britain and France saw major financial crashes at the beginning of the decade with the South Sea Bubble and the Mississippi Company respectively. Nonetheless it was a decade of stability in both countries under the leadership of Robert Walpole and Cardinal Fleury and the two nations, recently enemies, formed the Anglo-French Alliance.

Stylistically the decade was part of the Baroque era.

== Events ==
=== January–March ===
- January 21 – Treaties of Stockholm (Great Northern War): Sweden and Prussia sign a treaty by which part of Swedish Pomerania, including the town of Stettin, is ceded to Prussia.
- February 10 – Edmond Halley is appointed as Astronomer Royal for England.
- February 17 – The Treaty of The Hague is signed between Spain, Britain, France, Austria and the Dutch Republic, ending the War of the Quadruple Alliance with effect from May 20.
- February 24 – Battle of Nassau: Spanish forces assault the British settlement of Nassau, Bahamas at the end of the War of the Quadruple Alliance.
- March 11 (February 29 Old Style) – Queen Ulrika Eleonora of Sweden resigns, to let her husband Frederick I take over as king of Sweden. She had desired a joint rule, in a similar manner to William III and Mary II in Britain, but as the Riksdag of the Estates (Sweden's parliament) refuses this, she abdicates in her husband's favour instead.

=== April–June ===
- April 4 – The Riksdag of the Estates elects Frederick I new King of Sweden.
- April 17 – Bajirao I is appointed as the Peshwa of the Maratha Empire by Chhatrapati Shahu, succeeding his father Peshwa.
- May 2 – The Riksdag of the Estates in Sweden adopts the Instrument of Government (1720), an amendment of the 1719 constitution continuing the "Age of Liberty" in the country.
- May 3 – The coronation of King Frederick I of Sweden takes place in Stockholm, six weeks after his rule began.
- May – Great Plague of Marseille begins. The last major outbreak of bubonic plague in western Europe, the disease kill over 100,000 people in the city and surrounding area of France.
- May 20 – The Treaty of The Hague, signed between Spain and the Quadruple Alliance (Britain, France, the Netherlands and Austria) on February 17, goes into effect. Spain renounces its claims to the Italian possessions of the French throne, and Austria and the Duchy of Savoy trade Sicily for Sardinia.
- May 25 – The British privateer Speedwell, captained by George Shelvocke, is wrecked off of the coast of Chile on the uninhabited "Robinson Crusoe Island" (Más a Tierra, where Alexander Selkirk was marooned for 5 years). The crew is marooned for 5 months but can build a boat from timbers salvaged from the wreck, and is able to escape the island on October 6.
- June 1 – British silversmiths are once again allowed to use sterling silver after 24 years of being limited to a higher quality (but softer) Britannia silver.
- June 11 – The British Parliament approves the Bubble Act (officially the Royal Exchange and London Assurance Corporation Act 1719), prohibiting the formation of joint-stock companies without prior approval by royal charter.
- June 19 – At Burhanpur (in the modern-day Indian state of Madhya Pradesh), the Nizam-ul-Mulk of Hyderabad survives an attempted ambush by Mughal Empire forces dispatched by the Sayyid brothers (Syed Abdullah Khan and Syed Husain Ali Khan Barha) and goes on to establish a rival state in southern India.
- June 25 – The "South Sea Bubble", the phenomenal growth of the South Sea Company, reaches its peak as South Sea stock is priced at £1,060 a share. By the end of September, as panic sales are made, the price falls to £150.

=== July–September ===
- July 12 – Under the authority of the Bubble Act, the Lords Justices in Great Britain attempt to curb some of the excesses of the stock markets during the "South Sea Bubble". They dissolve a number of petitions for patents and charters, and abolish more than 80 joint-stock companies of dubious merit, but this has little effect on the creation of "Bubbles", ephemeral joint-stock companies created during the hysteria of the times.
- July 14 (July 3 O.S.) – The Treaty of Frederiksborg is signed between Denmark–Norway and Sweden, restoring the occupied portion of Swedish Pomerania to Sweden and ending the Great Northern War.
- July 27 – The Battle of Grengam takes place in the Ledsund strait between the island communities of Föglö and Lemland. It is the last major naval battle in the Great Northern War taking place in the Åland Islands, marking the end of Russian and Swedish offensive naval operations in Baltic waters.
- August 14 – The Spanish Villasur expedition, which set out on June 16 from New Mexico, with the intention of checking French influence on the Great Plains of North America, ends in failure, as it is ambushed by a Pawnee and Otoe force.
- September 30 – "South Sea Bubble": The English stock market crashes, with dropping prices for stock in the South Sea Company.

=== October–December ===
- October 8 – Sayyid Hussain Ali Khan Barha, one of the powerful Sayyid brothers of the Mughal Empire in India, is stabbed to death by Turkish nobleman Haider Beg Dughlat after Dughlat distracts him by giving him a petition to read. The assassination is ordered by Nizam ul-Mulk in retaliation for Sayyid Hussain's attempted ambush on June 19.
- October 15 – Muhammad Ibrahim, a grandson of the late Emperor Bahadur Shah I, is freed from prison by conspirators and declared the Mughal Emperor as a rival of his brother Muhammad Shah, beginning a 32-day reign that is described as being "like a drop of dew upon a blade of grass".
- November 13 – India's Mughal Emperor Muhammad Shah defeats his brother, pretender Muhammad Ibrahim, in a battle at Hasanpur (in Uttar Pradesh). Ibrahim is returned to incarceration at the citadel of Shahjahanabad, part of modern-day Delhi.
- November 16 – Pirate John Rackham (captured on October 22) is brought to trial at Spanish Town in Jamaica; he is hanged at Port Royal two days later. Most of his crew is also hanged but female pirates Mary Read and Anne Bonny are spared.
- December 8 – Fath-Ali Khan Daghestani is deposed from his position as Grand Vizier of Iran (at this time, part of the Safavid Empire) and tortured by Mohammadqoli Khan, the bodyguard of the Safavid Shah, Sultan Husayn.

=== Date unknown ===
- The Tuscarora people leave North Carolina as a result of European colonization.
- The Town on Queen Anne's Creek, North Carolina is renamed Edenton, in honor of North Carolina Governor Charles Eden; it is incorporated in 1722.
- The Guild Regulation of 1720 is introduced in Sweden.
- The Kangxi Emperor announces that all western businessmen in China can trade only in Guangzhou.
- The Academia Real da Historia is founded in Lisbon, Portugal.
- Jonathan Swift begins major composition work on Gulliver's Travels in Ireland.
- Il teatro alla moda, a satirical pamphlet by Benedetto Marcello, is published anonymously in Venice.
- The first yacht club in the world, the Royal Cork Yacht Club, is founded in Ireland.
- Parallel to the English South Sea Bubble France experiences the Mississippi Bubble. Market shares of the Mississippi Company reach a peak price of over 10,000 livres in spring just to plummet to 1,000 by the end of the year. Monthly inflation in France reaches 23 percent and a bank rush ensues when investors try in vain to convert paper notes issued by the Banque Royale into gold and silver. John Law, the Scottish architect of the Bubble, is forced to flee the country.

=== January–March ===
- January 6 – The Committee of Inquiry on the collapse of the South Sea Company in Great Britain publishes its findings.
- February 5 – James Stanhope, chief minister of Great Britain, dies a day after collapsing while vigorously defending his government's conduct over the "South Sea Bubble" in Parliament.
- March 24 – Johann Sebastian Bach's Brandenburg concertos are completed, and dedicated to Christian Ludwig of Brandenburg-Schwedt.

=== April–June ===
- April 4 – Robert Walpole becomes the first Prime Minister of Great Britain (although this is more a term of disparagement at this time).
- April 21 – The deadliest outbreak of smallpox in the history of Boston begins when the British ship HMS Sea Horse arrives in Boston Harbor with a crew of sailors who had survived a smallpox epidemic. One of the Seahorse crew who had cleared quarantine develops symptoms the next day and infects other people in a lodging house. Over the next 10 months, 5,759 cases of smallpox are recorded in Boston and 844 people die of the disease.
- April 26 – Pirates John Taylor and Olivier Levasseur capture the 700-ton Portuguese galleon Nossa Senhora do Cabo at Réunion. The total value of treasure on board (from Goa) is estimated as between £100,000 and £875,000, one of the largest pirate hauls ever.
- May 8 – Pope Innocent XIII succeeds Pope Clement XI, as the 244th pope.
- June 26 – Dr. Zabdiel Boylston of the Harvard University School of Medicine begins the first public inoculation campaign in order to slow the smallpox epidemic in Boston, giving a vaccine to his own son, and then to his slave and the slave's infant son.

=== July –September ===
- July 31 – The Spanish expedition led by Coahuila Governor José de Azlor y Virto de Vera, sent to recapture Texas from the French, encounters Neches River the smaller French force of Louis Juchereau de St. Denis, who had led the French expansion westward from the Louisiana territory. Realizing that his forces are badly outnumbered, St. Denis abandons hope of colonizing the east Texas territory and Azlor retakes the area.
- August 18 – The Sack of Shamakhi occurs, in the Persian Safavid Empire.
- September 10 (August 23 Old Style) – The Treaty of Nystad is signed, ending the Great Northern War.

=== October –December ===
- October 22 – The Kelantan Sultanate is established at Kelantan Darul Naim (modern-day Kelantan Darul Naim, Malaysia).
- November 2 (October 22 Old Style) – The Romanov and architect of the Great Northern War Peter I, is proclaimed the first Emperor of All the Russias. This replaces the 174-year-long Tsardom of Russia with the Russian Empire, which will collapse almost 200 years later in 1917.
- December 22 – Philip V of Spain signs a Royal Decree in Lerma, transforming the Seminary of Saint Rose of Lima in Caracas into the Universidad Real y Pontificia de Caracas.

=== Date unknown ===
- José de Azlor y Virto de Vera, Marquis of San Miguel de Aguayo and governor of Spanish Texas, establishes the fort of Presidio La Bahía at its original location, on the ruins of the failed French Fort Saint Louis.
- Regular mail service between London and New England is established.
- A suggestion box is developed under the eighth shōgun of Japan, Yoshimune Tokugawa.

=== January–March ===
- January 27 – Daniel Defoe's novel Moll Flanders is published anonymously in London.
- February 10 – The Battle of Cape Lopez begins off of the coast of West Africa (and present-day Gabon), as the Royal Navy brings an end to the piracy of Bartholomew Roberts, nicknamed "Black Bart". Captained by Chaloner Ogle of the Royal Navy, HMS Swallow fires its cannons as Roberts sails his ship Royal Fortune toward the oncoming Swallow in order to gain time by forcing Swallow to turn around. Standing on the deck, Roberts and two of his crew are killed by the second wave of cannon fire. The remaining 272 pirate crew are captured.
- February 16 – Peter the Great, Emperor of All Russia, publishes the Law on Succession, which rejects primogeniture and requires the reigning monarch to nominate their successor with regard to worthiness.
- February 21 – Nasir-ud-Din Muḥammad Shah, the Grand Mogul of north India's Mughal Empire, names Nizam-ul-Mulk as his Grand Vizier. Three years later, the Nizam will rebel against the Grand Mogul and create his own independent nation as the Nizam of Hyderabad, reigning as Asaf Jah.
- March 8 – Battle of Gulnabad in Persia: The Pashtun people of Afghanistan, led by Mahmud Hotak, decisively defeat forces of the Persian Safavid dynasty, precipitating its fall.

=== April–June ===
- April 2 – The first Silence Dogood letter, written by Benjamin Franklin, is printed.
- April 5 (Easter Sunday) – Dutch admiral Jacob Roggeveen lands on what is now Easter Island.
- May 5 – Pennsylvania colony enacts a statute, requiring all persons importing any person previously convicted of sodomy, to pay £5 for each such incoming person.
- May 9 – The 1722 British general election (began March 19) closes with Prime Minister Robert Walpole's Whig Party increasing its majority in the House of Commons of Great Britain, capturing 48 additional seats from the Tory Party and having a 389 to 169 advantage.
- June 15 – Pirate Edward Low and his men sail the stolen ship Rebecca into Port Roseway near modern Shelburne, Nova Scotia, where 13 fishing boats from Massachusetts are anchored. Over the next few days, the pirates board the boats and lay siege to them. On June 19, Low confiscates the schooner Mary from its owner, Joseph Dolliber, outfits it with cannons and renames it the Fancy. Eight of the fishermen are taken hostage as the stolen vessel departs, including Philip Ashton.

=== July–September ===
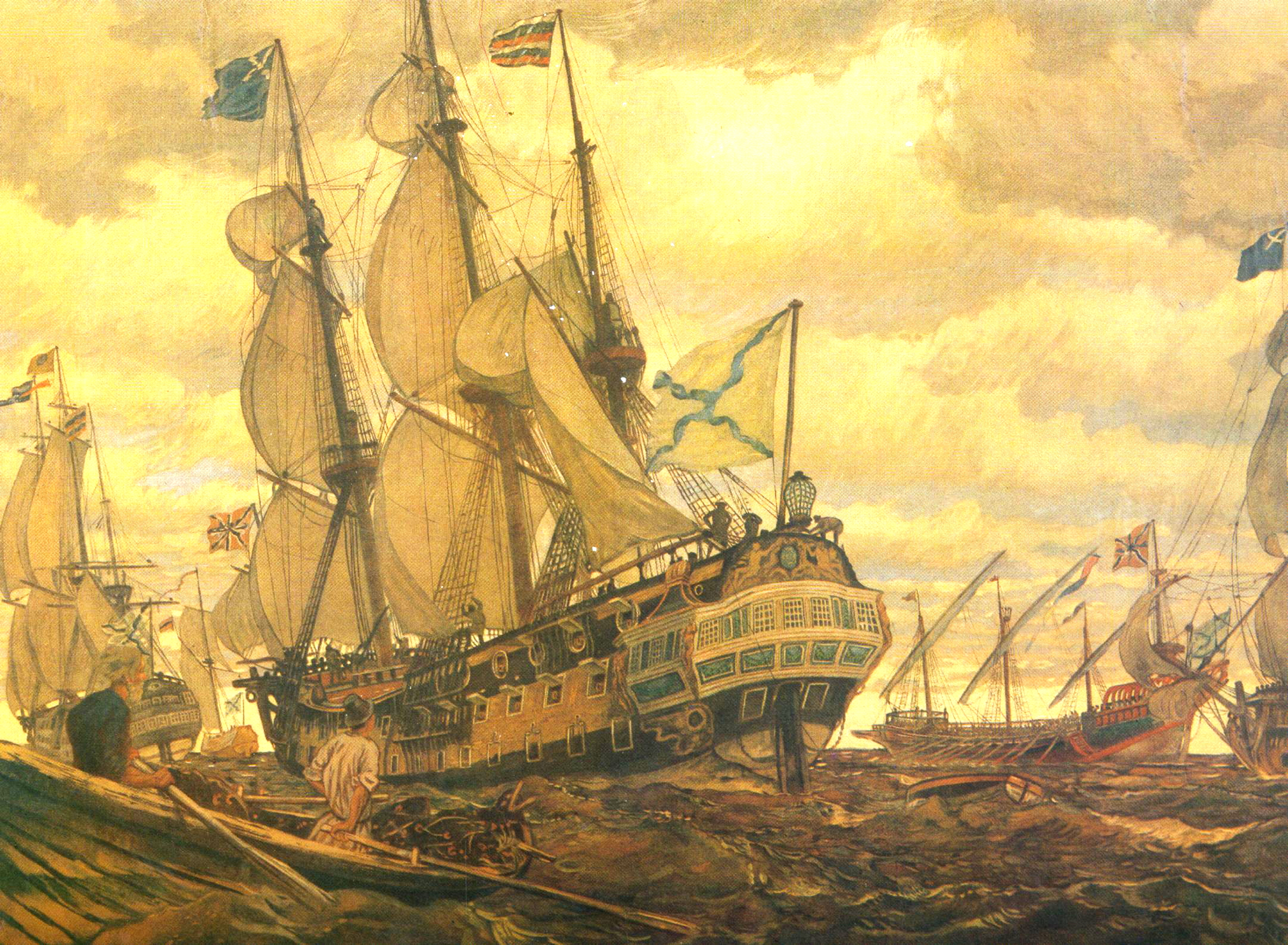
July 26: Start of the Russo-Persian War.

- July 25 – Father Rale's War (1722–1725) begins along the Maine and Massachusetts border.
- July 26 (July 15 O.S.) – The Russo-Persian War (1722–1723) begins with Peter the Great's Persian campaign.
- August 24 – Francis Atterbury, Anglican Bishop of Rochester and Dean of Westminster, is arrested in his deanery and confined in the Tower of London for treason, accused of leading the Jacobite "Atterbury Plot" in support of the pretender James Francis Edward Stuart with the aim of overthrowing the House of Hanover and King George I of Great Britain and restoring the House of Stuart by installing Prince James as "King James III".
- September 6 – Wälättä Giyorgis, a 16-year-old who nursed Ethiopia's Emperor Bakaffa back to health after he fell ill, marries the Emperor and begins her rise to power as the Empress Mentewab. Upon Bakaffa's death in 1730, Mentewab becomes the regent for her son by Bakaffa, Iyasu II.
- September 23 – La Nouvelle-Orléans (New Orleans), recently established by France as the capital of the Louisiana Territory is hit by what is later called the "Great Hurricane of 1722", starting with 7 feet (2.1 m) high waves, followed by winds in excess of 100 miles per hour (160 km/h). By September 24, "Almost every public building in New Orleans, from the hospital to the cathedral" is "either unroofed or totally ruined."

=== October–December ===
- October 23 – The six-month-long Siege of Isfahan ends, when the Safavid capital Isfahan capitulates to the Afghan rebels. Safavid Sultan Husayn abdicates, and acknowledges Mahmud Hotak as the new Shah of Persia.
- November 15 (November 4 O.S.) – Russia's Emperor Peter the Great issues an order establishing the Caspian Flotilla during its war against Persia to gain complete control of the landlocked Caspian Sea.
- November 20 – The Dutch East India Company cargo ship Schoonenberg runs aground in South Africa's Struis Bay and is looted by most of its 110 crew, beginning a legend and questions of whether the wreck was part of a conspiracy or simply an accident. Almost 300 years later, the event is reconstructed in detail by investigators.
- December 20 – After the longest reign by a Chinese Emperor in history (61 years), the Kangxi Emperor dies, and is succeeded by his son Yinzhen as Yongzheng Emperor.

=== Date unknown ===
- Edenton is incorporated as the county seat of Chowan County, North Carolina. The governor and assembly of North Carolina move to Edenton, making it the de facto capital of North Carolina until 1746, when the government is moved to New Bern.
- Peter the Great of Russia creates the Table of Ranks.
- A small group of Bohemian Brethren (the "Hidden Seed") from northern Moravia are allowed to settle in a new village, Herrnhut, on the Berthelsdorf estate of the pietist Count Nicolaus Zinzendorf in Upper Lusatia (Saxony), forming the Herrnhuter Brüdergemeine, seed of the Moravian Church's renewal.
- The Chiesa del Purgatorio, Venafro, Italy, Catholic Church is built.
- The first public theatre in Denmark, Lille Grønnegade Theatre, is founded in Copenhagen.
- Modern music theory finds definition in Jean-Philippe Rameau's Traité de l'harmonie réduite à ses principes naturels (Treatise on Harmony), published in Paris.
- The "Brown Bess" muzzle-loading smoothbore musket becomes the British Army's standard infantry firearm for land combat for more than a century.
- Johann Sebastian Bach composes The Well-Tempered Clavier.

=== January–March ===
- January 25 – English-born pirate Edward Low intercepts the Portuguese ship Nostra Signiora de Victoria. After the Portuguese captain throws his treasure of 11,000 gold coins into the sea rather than surrendering it, Low orders the captain's brutal torture and execution, then has the rest of the Victoria crew murdered. Low commits more atrocities this year, but is not certainly heard of after the end of the year.
- February 4 – The Kangxi Era ends in Qing dynasty China, and the Yongzheng Era begins, with the coronation of Yinzhen, the Yongzheng Emperor.
- February 15 – King Louis XV of France attains his majority on his 13th birthday, bringing an end to the regency of his cousin Philippe II, Duke of Orléans.
- March 9 – The Mapuche Uprising begins in Chile as the indigenous Mapuche people, commanded by Toqui (war chief) Vilumilla, leading an attack against the city of Tucapel. The war lasts until February 13, 1726.
- March 28 – The capture of Rasht from the Persian Empire by the Russian Empire brings Rasht and the Gilan Province under Russian control.

=== April–June ===
- April 1 – In Switzerland, the attempt by Major Abraham Davel to make the canton of Vaud independent of the Swiss government, is put down, one day after he and 500 men had taken control of the Vaudois capital, Lausanne. Davel is arrested, tortured and tried for treason; he is beheaded on April 24.
- May 27 – The Black Act 1723, intended to combat illegal hunting in Great Britain, comes into force and expands the number of crimes that are punishable by death, and remains in effect for 100 years.
- May 30 – Johann Sebastian Bach assumed the office of Thomaskantor in Leipzig, presenting his first new cantata, Die Elenden sollen essen, BWV 75, in the St. Nicholas Church on the first Sunday after Trinity.
- June 26 – Russo-Persian War: Baku surrenders to the Russians.

=== July–September ===
- July 2 – Bach's Magnificat is first performed.
- July 12 – Christian von Wolff holds a lecture for students and the magistrates at the end of his term as a rector, as a result of which he is banned from Prussia, on a charge of atheism.
- July 18 – Johann Sebastian Bach leads the first performance of his cantata Erforsche mich, Gott, und erfahre mein Herz, BWV 136, in Leipzig on the eighth Sunday after Trinity.
- August 10 – Philippe II, Duke of Orléans, who had served as the Regent of France to rule for King Louis XV from 1715 until the latter's attainment of majority on February 15, is appointed by the King to serve as his Prime Minister, but dies in office less than four months later.
- August 11 – The Ostend Company is chartered by merchants and shipowners to establish trade for the Austrian Netherlands in the East Indies and West Indies. Over the next two days, 54 major investors in Antwerp purchase the shares of stock in the company.
- August 15 – The Peterhof Palace is opened in a formal ceremony just outside Saint Petersburg, capital of the Russian Empire.
- September 1 – The Treaty of Saint Petersburg is signed in Russia, ending the Russo-Persian War (1722–1723).
- September 14 – Grand Master of the Knights Hospitaller António Manoel de Vilhena lays down the first stone of Fort Manoel in Malta.

=== October–December ===
- October 23 – Russian Emperor Peter the Great authorizes an incentive for men of Serbia to join a new Russian Imperial Army unit, the Serbian Hussar Regiment. The Emperor sends Jovan Albanez to recruit new officers and troops with a grant of farmable land in Russia, and 1,070 take advantage of the offer over the next two years.
- October 31 – Gian Gastone de' Medici becomes the new Grand Duke of Tuscany upon the death of his father Cosimo III de' Medici; he will be the state's last ruler from the House of Medici. During his reign, the state treasury is depleted and Tuscany becomes one of the poorest nations in Europe.
- November 23 – The Province of Carolina charters New Bern as Newbern (the town later becomes the capital of North Carolina until Raleigh is founded).
- December 2 – Philippe II, Duke of Orléans, regent of France from 1715 to 1723, and Prime Minister since August 10, dies at the age of 49 at Versailles.
- December 26 – Bach leads the first performance of Darzu ist erschienen der Sohn Gottes, BWV 40, his first Christmas Cantata composed for Leipzig.

=== Date unknown ===
- The Province of Carolina incorporates Beaufort, North Carolina, as the Port of Beaufort, making it the third incorporated town in the province.

=== January–March ===
- January 15 – King Philip V of Spain abdicates the throne in favour of his 16-year-old son Louis I.
- January 18 – The Dutch East India Company cargo ship Fortuyn, on its maiden voyage, departs from the Cape of Good Hope in South Africa after a layover of 16 days following its arrival from the Netherlands. With a crew of 225 commanded by Pieter Westrik, the ship departs for Batavia in the Dutch East Indies and is never seen again.
- January 22 – Bruno Mauricio de Zabala, Spanish Captain general of the Río de la Plata, forces the Portuguese to abandon their fortified settlement at what will become the city of Montevideo in Uruguay.
- January 28 – Saint Petersburg State University is established in Russia.
- February 8 – Catherine I of Russia is officially named tsaritsa by her husband, Peter the Great.
- February 20 – The premiere of Giulio Cesare, an Italian opera by George Frideric Handel, takes place in London.
- March 7 – Pope Innocent XIII dies at the age of 68 after less than three years as the Roman Catholic pontiff.
- March 20 – The 1724 papal conclave opens in Rome, 13 days after the death of Innocent XIII. Starting with 33 electors and eventually having 53, the conclave deliberates for more than two months before selecting a successor.

=== April–June ===
- April 7 – (Good Friday) Bach leads the first performance of his St John Passion,""carefully designed with a great deal of musico-theological intent", on Good Friday.
- April 10 – Bach leads the first performance of his cantata Erfreut euch, ihr Herzen, BWV 66, his first cantata composed for Easter in Leipzig.
- April 23 – Johann Sebastian Bach leads the first performance of his cantata Du Hirte Israel, höre, BWV 104, illustrating the topic of the Good Shepherd in pastoral music.
- April 28 – The first of the seven Drapier's Letters, satirical pamphlets seeking to arouse public opinion in Ireland against the imposition by the British of a privately minted copper coinage, is published by Jonathan Swift, Dean of St Patrick's Cathedral, Dublin and author, writing under the pseudonym "M. B., Drapier", identifying himself as a drapier or seller of cloth.
- May 13 – Cardinal Giulio Piazza, the Archbishop of Faenza, comes within four votes of being elected the new Pope
- May 29 – Cardinal Vincenzo Orsini, the Archbishop of Benevento, accepts the papacy, two days after being unanimously selected by the cardinals at the papal conclave in Rome. He becomes the 245th pontiff as Pope Benedict XIII.
- June 11 – Johann Sebastian Bach leads his cantata O Ewigkeit, du Donnerwort (O eternity, you word of thunder), BWV 20, on the first Sunday after Trinity, beginning his second cycle, the chorale cantata cycle.
- June 23 – The Treaty of Constantinople is signed, partitioning Persia between the Ottoman Empire and Russia.
- June 24 – On the Feast of St. John the Baptist, Bach leads the first performance of his Christ unser Herr zum Jordan kam, BWV 7, the third cantata of his chorale cantata cycle.

=== July–September ===
- July 2 – On the Feast of the Visitation, Bach leads the first performance of his Meine Seel erhebt den Herren, BWV 10, the fifth cantata of his chorale cantata cycle.
- July 27 – "Peter the Wild Boy" is captured near Helpensen in Hanover.
- July 31 – The Hyderabad State is created in India, as Mughal Emperor Muhammad Shah rewards his associate Mir Qamar-ud-din Khan. Qamar-ud-din becomes the first Nizam of Hyderabad. The princely state exists for more than 220 years, coming to an end after India's independence from Britain.
- August – Longman, the oldest surviving publishing house in England, is founded in London by Thomas Longman.
- August 13 – Johann Sebastian Bach leads the first performance of Nimm von uns, Herr, du treuer Gott, BWV 101, a chorale cantata on a famous tune.
- August 31 – Louis I of Spain dies of smallpox, aged 17, after a reign of seven months, and his father Philip V resumes the throne.
- September 4 – José de Grimaldo, who had been Prime Minister for Spain's King Philip V until the latter's abdication in January, resumes office with the return of King Philip.
- September 10 – Johann Sebastian Bach leads the first performance of Jesu, der du meine Seele, BWV 78, a chorale cantata based on a passion hymn by Johann Rist.
- September 24 – The Paris Bourse, the stock exchange for France, is created by order of King Louis XV on the advice of Nicolas Ravot d'Ombreval, four years after a financial panic had shut down trading. Stock markets had already been set up in Lyon, Bourdeaux and Toulouse.
- September 29 – J. S. Bach leads the first performance of Herr Gott, dich loben alle wir, BWV 130, for the feast of archangel Michael, based on Paul Eber's hymn in twelve stanzas.

=== October–December ===
- October 2 – Muhammad bin Nasir is elected as the new Imam of Oman after the overthrow of his brother, Saif bin Sultan II.
- October 15 – The historic Teatro Nuovo opera house is inaugurated in Naples with the premiere of Antonio Orefice's comic opera Lo Simmele.
- October 16 – Yeongjo becomes the new emperor of Korea after the death of his older brother Gyeongjong. He reigns for almost 52 years until his death on April 22, 1776.
- October 22 – J. S. Bach leads the first performance of Schmücke dich, o liebe Seele (Adorn yourself, O dear soul) in Leipzig on the 20th Sunday after Trinity, based on the communion hymn of the same name.
- October 31 – George Frideric Handel's opera Tamerlano is performed for the first time, premiering in London. The opera will be revived as late as 2009.
- November 11 – Joseph Blake (alias "Blueskin"), English highwayman, is hanged in London.
- November 16
  - Highwayman Jack Sheppard is hanged in London.
  - Willem Mons, lover of Catherine I of Russia, is executed, and his head preserved in alcohol.
- November 19 – The Dutch East India Company frigate Slot ter Hooge strikes rocks and sinks off Porto Santo Island, Madeira, with the loss of 221 of the 254 people on board.
- December 2 – The Metropolitan Mojsije Petrović, leader of the Serbian Orthodox Church within the Habsburg monarchy, issues a 57-point decree to purge the church of the Turkish influence.
- December 7
  - In the aftermath of an attack against Jesuit Catholics led by the Lutheran mayor of the Prussian city of Thorn (modern-day Toruń, Poland), ten Lutheran officials (including mayor Johann Gottfried Rösner) are executed in the town square. Rösner and seven others are decapitated by an axe, while two others are hanged, drawn and quartered for blasphemy.
  - By order of the Nizam, Hyderabad is made the permanent capital of the Indian princely state of the same name. It becomes capital of the Indian states of Telangana and Andhra Pradesh
- December 14 – The Viceroyalty of Zhili (modern-day Hebei province) is recreated in the Chinese Empire by the Emperor Yongzheng for the first time in 55 years, with Li Weijun as the first Viceory. Zhili exists as a viceroyalty until the fall of the Qing dynasty in 1912.
- December 24 – Francesco Valesio resumes writing his Diario di Roma, 13 years after he ceased his recording of daily life in Rome.
- December 25 – J. S. Bach leads the first performance of Gelobet seist du, Jesu Christ, BWV 91, in Leipzig, based on Luther's 1524 Christmas hymn.

=== Date unknown ===
- China expels foreign missionaries.
- Blenheim Palace construction is completed in England. It is presented as a gift from the nation to the Duke of Marlborough, for his involvement in the Battle of Blenheim in 1704.
- The Austrian Netherlands agree to the Pragmatic Sanction.
- Shah Mahmud Hotaki of Afghanistan goes insane.
- The Kaitokudō academy merchant school, part predecessor of Osaka University is founded in Japan.

=== January–March ===
- January 1 – J. S. Bach leads the first performance of his chorale cantata Jesu, nun sei gepreiset, BWV 41, which features the trumpet fanfares from the beginning also in the end.
- January 6 – J. S. Bach leads the first performance of Liebster Immanuel, Herzog der Frommen, BWV 123, a chorale cantata for Epiphany.
- January 15 – James Macrae, a former captain of a freighter for the British East India Company, is hired by the Company to administer the Madras Presidency (at this time, the "Presidency of Fort St. George"), and begins major reforms. The area administered is most of Southern India, including what is now the Indian state of Andhra Pradesh, parts the states of Tamil Nadu, Kerala, Karnataka, Telangana, Odisha and the union territory of Lakshadweep.
- January 20 – James Figg hosts the first recorded international boxing match, fought between English livestock drover Bob Whitaker and Venetian gondolier Alberto di Carni in London.
- January 25 – The Spanish corsair Amaro Pargo receives the title of Hidalgo (nobleman).
- January – In Japan, the policy of the Gonin Gumi organizing groups of every five households in a town into units collectively responsible for the good behavior of everyone in the unit, goes into effect as the register of units is completed by the Tokugawa shogunate.
- February 2 – J. S. Bach leads the first performance of his chorale cantata Mit Fried und Freud ich fahr dahin, BWV 125, based on Luther's paraphrase of the Nunc dimittis.
- February 8 – (January 28 Old Style) Catherine I becomes Empress of Russia on the death of her husband, Peter the Great.
- February 20 – The first reported case of white men scalping Native Americans takes place in New Hampshire colony.
- February 23 – J. S. Bach leads his Tafel-Music Shepherd Cantata for the birthday of Christian, Duke of Saxe-Weissenfels.
- March 25 – Bach's chorale cantata Wie schön leuchtet der Morgenstern, BWV 1, is first performed on the Feast of the Annunciation, coinciding with Palm Sunday.
- March 30 – The second performance of Johann Sebastian Bach's St John Passion, BWV 245 (including 5 movements from his Weimarer Passion), takes place at St. Thomas Church, Leipzig.

=== April–June ===
- April 1 – J. S. Bach's later Easter Oratorio in its first version is performed at the Nikolaikirche in Leipzig on Easter Sunday.
- April 2 – J. S. Bach's cantata Bleib bei uns, denn es will Abend werden, BWV 6, is first performed in Leipzig on Easter Monday.
- April 30 – Charles VI, Holy Roman Emperor and King Philip V of Spain sign the Treaty of Vienna.
- May 12 – The Black Watch is raised as a military company, as part of the pacification of the Scottish Highlands under General George Wade.
- May 15 – Bach leads the first performance of his cantata Ich bin ein guter Hirt, BWV 85, about Jesus as the Good Shepherd.
- May 21 – On the day of the grand wedding of her daughter Anna to the Duke of Holstein-Gottorp, Empress Catherine I of Russia creates the Order of Saint Alexander Nevsky
- May 24 – Jonathan Wild, fraudulent 'Thief-Taker General', is hanged at Tyburn in London, for actually aiding criminals.
- June 23 – The Malt tax riots begin in Scotland in Hamilton, South Lanarkshire, after the price of beer and scotch whisky increases. Earlier in the year, the British government extended the taxes in England on malted grain to brewers and distilleries in Scotland. The rioting then spreads throughout Scottish counties.
- June 24 – The Grand Lodge of Ireland in Dublin holds its first recorded meeting, making it the second most senior Grand Lodge in world Freemasonry, and the oldest in continuous existence.

=== July–September ===
- July 8 – Mattheus de Haan becomes the new Governor-General of the Dutch East Indies (modern-day Indonesia), governing until his death on June 1, 1729 in Batavia (modern Jakarta).
- July 15 – Sir Richard Everard becomes the 4th Governor of North Carolina.
- August 15 – The civil marriage of King Louis XV of France and Princess Maria Leszczyńska of Poland is held at Strasbourg. The King is not present, and his cousin, the Duke of Orléans, serves as his proxy.
- August 19 – J. S. Bach leads the first performance of Lobe den Herren, den mächtigen König der Ehren, BWV 137, a cantata setting the unchanged text of Neander's hymn.
- August 27 – At least 216 people die in the sinking of the Chameau, a ship of the French Navy, after the vessel is driven by a storm into rocks off of the coast of Nova Scotia. Reportedly, 180 bodies wash ashore near Louisbourg. The ship's cargo, which included a fortune in gold and silver coins, is discovered 240 years later in 1965.
- September 5 – The day after they meet for the first time, the wedding ceremony of King Louis and Marie takes place in Fontainebleau, making her the Queen Consort of France. Their marriage lasts for almost 43 years until her death in 1768.
- September 16 – The Treaty of Hanover is signed between Great Britain, France and Prussia.

=== October–December ===
- October 19 – Joan Paul Schaghen is appointed by the Dutch East India Company to serve as the Governor of Ceylon after the death of Johannes Hertenberg.
- October 23 – Russia dispatches 1,500 troops and 120 civilians to Russia's border with China, on a mission to survey the boundaries in order to make a treaty with the Chinese Empire. Serbian adventurer Sava Vladislavich leads a group of cartographers to prepare maps in advance of traveling on to Beijing.
- November 5 – The fourth and final treaty of the 1725 Peace of Vienna is signed to create an alliance between Austria and Spain.
- November 8 – The first newspaper in the Province of New York, the New-York Gazette, is introduced by William Bradford as a weekly publication.
- November 22 – Chief Chicagou of the Mitchigamea tribe, and chiefs of five other tribes of the Illini Confederation, are received as guests of King Louis XV in Paris. Chicagou pledges the Illini's support of the French presence in North America.
- November 26 – British astronomers James Bradley and Samuel Molyneux set up a telescope in Molyneux's private observatory to begin their observations of stellar parallax of the star Gamma Draconis. The observations, which start on December 3, lead to Bradley's pioneering discovery of the aberration of light.
- December 12 – Johan Willem Ripperda of the Netherlands, the former Dutch Ambassador to Spain, arrives in Madrid and claims that King Philip V has appointed him as the new Prime Minister. The bluff is successful and he is granted authority by the King's advisers, but after four months, he is forced to resign.
- December 15 – A treaty is signed by chiefs of four member tribes of the Wabanaki Confederacy (the Abenaki, Pequawket, Mi'kmaq, Maliseet) and representatives of three British provinces in North America (Massachusetts Bay, New Hampshire and Nova Scotia) and their allies, the Mohawk nation, bringing an end to Dummer's War, named for acting Massachusetts Bay Governor William Dummer.
- December 25 – J. S. Bach leads the first performance of the Christmas cantata Unser Mund sei voll Lachens, BWV 110, making laughter audible in singing.

=== Date unknown ===
- The Terengganu Sultanate is established at Terengganu Darul Iman (in modern Malaysia).
- A fire in Wapping, London, destroys 70 houses.
- In Qing dynasty China, 66 copies of a 5,020 volume-long encyclopedia, the Complete Classics Collection of Ancient China are printed, necessitating the crafting of 250,000 movable type characters cast in bronze.
- Freemasonry is established in France, as an English import.
- The Four Seasons, a set of violin concertos by Antonio Vivaldi, is published.
- Gradus ad Parnassum, a seminal work on counterpoint, laying out rules of constructing music, is published by Johann Joseph Fux.

=== January–March ===
- January 1 – J. S. Bach leads the first performance of Herr Gott, dich loben wir, BWV 16, his church cantata for New Year's Day to a libretto by Georg Christian Lehms.
- January 20 – J. S. Bach leads the first performance of his cantata Meine Seufzer, meine Tränen (My sighs, my tears), BWV 13, for the second Sunday after Epiphany.
- January 23 (January 12 Old Style) – The Conventicle Act (Konventikelplakatet) is adopted in Sweden, outlawing all non-Lutheran religious meetings outside of church services.
- January 26 – The First Treaty of Vienna is signed between Austria, the Holy Roman Empire and Spain, creating the Austro-Spanish Alliance in advance of a war against Great Britain.
- January 27 – J. S. Bach leads the first performance of Alles nur nach Gottes Willen, BWV 72, concluding his third Christmas season in Leipzig on the Third Sunday after Epiphany.
- January 27 – On its maiden voyage, the Dutch East India Company frigate Aagtekerke departs from the Dutch Cape Colony on the second leg of its journey to the Dutch East Indies across the Indian Ocean and is never seen again. Aagtekerke carried a crew of 200 men.
- February 8 – The Supreme Privy Council is established in Russia.
- February 13 – The Parliament of Negrete (between Mapuche and Spanish authorities in Chile) brings an end to the Mapuche uprising of 1723–26.
- March 2 – In London, a night watchman finds a severed head by the River Thames; it is later recognized to be that of the husband of Catherine Hayes. She and an accomplice are later executed.
- March 10 – China's Yongzheng Emperor issues a special edict instructing his "Vice Minister of Punishments" Huang Bing to interrogate Qin Daoran, who provides the evidence that Yongzheng's brothers Yintang, Yin-ssu and Yin-ti, had conspired to overthrow the Emperor.
- March 29 – The first large shipment of slaves is brought to New Orleans as the slave ship L'Aurore arrives with 290 black Africans captured in Gambia. During the 90-day voyage from Gorée in Senegal, 60 of the slaves have died.
- March 30 – After King Haffon of the West African Kingdom of Whydah (in modern-day Benin) allows Portuguese traders to build the Fort of São João Baptista de Ajudá in the capital at Savi, mercenaries of the Dutch West India Company make a failed attempt to destroy the fort by "throwing two flaming spears over the walls". By 1726, traders from Britain, France, the Netherlands and Portugal are all competing to establish trade with Whydah, which supplies other West Africans to be used as slaves.
- March 31 – France's first ambassador to Russia, Jacques de Campredon, leaves after four years of trying to negotiate a Franco-Russian alliance with Catherine I and a failed attempt to arrange a marriage between King Louis XV and Catherine's daughter Elizabeth.

=== April–June ===
- May 1 – Voltaire begins his exile in England.
- June 11 – André-Hercule de Fleury, recalled from exile by King Louis XV of France (his former pupil), forces banishment of Louis Henri, Duke of Bourbon, the Prime Minister, and the Duke's mistress Madame de Prie from court. Financier Jean Pâris de Monmartel is also removed from his position as Guard of the Royal Treasury.

=== July–September ===
- August 7 – English-born pirate Nicholas Brown is captured near Xtabi, Jamaica.
- September 8 – J. S. Bach leads the first performance of Geist und Seele wird verwirret, BWV 35, a solo cantata for alto voice.
- September 6 – An explosion kills all but seven of the 700 passengers and crew on the Portuguese Navy galleon HMFMS Santa Rosa as its cargo of gunpowder blows up. Historians speculate that of the 693 people on the ship, those who weren't killed by the explosion drowned or were killed by sharks as the ship went down off of the coast of Recife.
- September 11 – French bishop André-Hercule de Fleury, later Prime Minister for King Louis XV of France, is made a Roman Catholic Cardinal by Pope Benedict XIII.
- September 14 – The Nanfan Treaty of July 19, 1701 between the Iroquois Confederacy and the British Province of New York, is amended by both parties.
- September 16 – An earthquake strikes Sicily and kills 226 people in Palermo.
- September 22 – Bach leads the first performance of his cantata Wer Dank opfert, der preiset mich, BWV 17, in Leipzig.
- September 23 – Charles VI, Holy Roman Emperor, issues an order limiting the number of Jews who can be legally recognized as legitimate householders.
- September 24 – Permission to celebrate the feast of Our Lady of Mount Carmel, celebrated on July 17, is extended by Pope Benedict XIII to the entire Roman Catholic Church.
- September 29 – J. S. Bach leads the first performance of Es erhub sich ein Streit, BWV 130, for the feast of Michael, the archangel.

=== October–December ===
- October 1 – Juan Bautista de Orendáin y Azpilicueta is appointed again as Secretary of the Universal Bureau (Secretario del Despacho), the equivalent of the Prime Minister of Spain, after the retirement of José de Grimaldo.
- October 5 – Grigore II Ghica becomes the Prince of Moldavia for the first time after Mihai Racoviță steps aside.
- October 27 – J. S. Bach leads the first performance of Ich will den Kreuzstab gerne tragen, BWV 56, one of the few works he calls a cantata.
- November 8 (October 28 Old Style) – Jonathan Swift's satirical novel Gulliver's Travels is first published (anonymously) in London; it sells out within a week.
- November 20 – Callinicus, Metropolitan of Heraclea dies suddenly only one day after being elected the Ecumenical Patriarch of Constantinople, the highest office in the Eastern Orthodox Church. Callinicus is said to have paid a record fee to the Ottoman Sultan to guarantee his appointment.
- November – Mary Toft allegedly gives birth to 16 rabbits in England; the story is later revealed to be a hoax.
- December 24 – The settlement of Montevideo is founded by the Spaniards in the Viceroyalty of Peru.

=== Date unknown ===
- Late 1726 – Nader Shah recaptures Mashhad.
- Muhammad bin Saud becomes head of the House of Saud.
- The Complete Classics Collection of Ancient China, an immense Chinese encyclopedia, is printed using copper-based movable type printing.
- The remaining ruins of Liverpool Castle in England are finally demolished.

=== January–March ===
- January 1 – (December 21, 1726 O.S.) Spain's ambassador to Great Britain demands that the British return Gibraltar after accusing Britain of violating the terms of the 1713 Treaty of Utrecht. Britain refuses and the Thirteenth Siege of Gibraltar begins on February 22.
- January 6 – Martin Spanberg and two other members of the First Kamchatka expedition arrive in Okhotsk, after a journey from Saint Petersburg of almost two years. After the end of winter, the 63-member group, commanded by Vitus Bering, proceeds to the Kamchatka River, to prepare for exploration of the Arctic.
- January 9 – The world-famous Charité Hospital is established in Berlin, to be used for research and to help the poor. Prussia's King Frederick William I had ordered the conversion of a 16-year old institution, originally built in anticipation of an epidemic of the bubonic plague.
- January 12 – Abd el-Sayed of Egypt is enthroned, as Pope John XVII of Alexandria becomes the leader of the Coptic Christian Church, as the 105th Pope of Alexandria and Patriarch of the Holy See of St. Mark. He will serve until his death on April 20, 1745.
- February 2 – Johann Sebastian Bach's solo cantata, Ich habe genug, BWV 82, premieres in Leipzig.
- February 20 – German composer George Frideric Handel becomes a British subject.
- February 22 (February 11, 1726 O.S.) – Spain besieges the British-held territory of Gibraltar, in order to recapture it. Britain's Royal Navy begins a blockade of Spanish ports and the unsuccessful siege ends with the signing of a truce on June 24.
- March 4 – Battle of Halidzor in Armenia: A small group of defenders overcomes a much larger Ottoman Empire army.
- March 9 – The west African Kingdom of Dahomey, ruled by King Trudo Agaja, conquers and annexes the Kingdom of Xwéda, after King Haffon is killed in battle (three years earlier, Agaja conquered the neighboring state of Allada).
- March 22 – After 55 years as Sultan of Morocco, Ismail Ibn Sharif dies at the age of 81, prompting a 30-year battle between seven of his sons, for succession to the throne.

=== April–June ===
- April 11 – Johann Sebastian Bach's St Matthew Passion (BWV 244b) premieres at St. Thomas Church, Leipzig.
- May 12 – History of the Moravian Church: The 18th century renewal: The Brotherly Agreement is adopted by the Moravian Church community at Herrnhut, under the influence of Count Nicolaus Zinzendorf, beginning the Church's renewal.
- May 17 – Peter II of Russia was made Emperor of Russia, eleven years of age.
- May 31 – The Royal Bank of Scotland is founded by Royal Charter in Edinburgh.
- June 22 (July 11 Old Style) – George, Prince of Wales, becomes King George II of Great Britain, on the death of his father.
- June 23 – Spain ceases hostilities after its attempt to recapture Gibraltar from Britain fails. A truce is signed the next day.
- June 27 – Uxbridge, Massachusetts, is incorporated as a town.

=== July–September ===
- July 1 – In India, Shuja-ud-Din Muhammad Khan becomes the new Nawab of Bengal after the death of his father-in-law, Murshid Quli Khan. At the time, Bengal consists of what is now the nation of Bangladesh and the southeast Indian state of West Bengal and is subservient to the Mughal Empire.
- July 23 – Seventeen Ursuline Sisters from France land in New Orleans, in the Louisiana territory of New France, after a journey that began on February 22. They later create the orphanage which is the predecessor of Catholic Charities and the Ursuline Academy, the oldest Catholic school in the United States.
- August 13 – History of the Moravian Church: The 18th century renewal: The Moravian Church community at Herrnhut undergoes a Pentecostal experience.
- August 14 – Elections for the House of Commons begin in Great Britain and continue until October 17.
- August 30 – Anne, eldest daughter of King George II of Great Britain, is given the title Princess Royal.
- September 8 – A barn fire during a puppet show in the village of Burwell, Cambridgeshire, England, kills 78 people, many of them children. Another report says that all but six of the 160 persons assembled were killed in the accidental fire.

=== October–December ===
- October 11 – George II of Great Britain is crowned. Handel's Coronation Anthems are composed for the event, including Zadok the Priest, which has been played at every subsequent Coronation of the British monarch.
- October 17 – With voting for the British House of Commons concluding, the Whigs, led by Sir Robert Walpole, increase their supermajority, winning 415 of the 558 seats. The Tories share of Commons decreases from 169 to 128.
- November 18 – Tabriz earthquake, Persia kills 77,000.
- November 21 – The Netherlands signs the Treaty of Seville.
- November 27 – The foundation stone of the Jerusalem's Church in Berlin is laid.
- December 8 – For the first time since the union of England and Scotland into Great Britain, the Royal Bank of Scotland, which still retains the right to print currency, issues its first pound note, printing paper currency for twenty shillings. The Scottish pound note continues to be printed until 2001 and the smallest denomination now is a five pound note.
- December 17 – The London Evening Post, a conservative newspaper, publishes its first issue. It continues in regular publication for 70 years.

=== Date unknown ===
- An old woman known as Janet (Jenny) Horne of Loth, Sutherland becomes the last alleged witch in the British Isles to be executed, when she is burned at the stake in Dornoch, Scotland. (Some sources give the date as June 1722.)
- The first Amish move to North America.
- 1727–1800 – Lt. Col. Francisco de Mello Palheta smuggles coffee seeds to Brazil in a bouquet, starting a coffee empire.

=== January–March ===
- January 5 – The Real y Pontificia Universidad de San Gerónimo de la Habana, the oldest university in Cuba, is founded in Havana.
- January 9 – The coronation of Peter II as the Tsar of the Russian Empire takes place in Moscow.
- January 29 – The Beggar's Opera, the most popular theatrical production of the 18th century, is performed for the first time. The premiere takes place at the Lincoln's Inn Fields Theatre in London. Written by John Gay with music arranged by Johann Christoph Pepusch, the ballad opera is a satire of Italian opera.
- February 28 – Battle of Palkhed: Maratha Peshwa Bajirao I defeats the first Nizam of Hyderabad, Nizam-ul-Mulk.
- March 14 – Jean-Jacques Rousseau leaves Geneva for the first time.

=== April–June ===
- April 14 – Saint Serapion of Algiers, the first Mercedarian (of the Order of the Blessed Virgin Mary of Mercy) is canonized by Pope Benedict XIII.
- April 29 – John Essington, a member of the British House of Commons, is expelled from Commons after a successful petition to have him unseated. Essington, deep in debt, dies in Newgate Prison less than year later.
- April 30 – The 82 survivors of the wreckage of the Dutch East India Company frigate Zeewijk arrive in the new ship that they had built, Sloepie, at their original destination of Batavia in the Dutch East Indies (now Jakarta in Indonesia).
- May 16 – Saint Margaret of Cortona, the patron saint of the falsely accused, homeless people and mental illness sufferers, is canonized.
- May 25 – Pope Gregory VII (Hildebrand of Sovana), who served as pontiff from 1073 to 1085, is canonized as a Roman Catholic saint.
- May 31 – The Royal Bank of Scotland invents the overdraft, allowing Edinburgh merchant William Hogg cash credit (in the amount of £1,000) for his creditors to be paid by the bank until Hogg receives expected revenue to repay the amount owed, plus interest.
- June 14 – The Congress of Soissons opens at the French town of Soissons to negotiate a treaty between Great Britain and Spain. The treaty, which is concluded on November 9, 1729, recognizes the Spanish royal family's rule of parts of Italy, and Britain's possession of Gibraltar and Menorca.
- June 25 – The Treaty of Kyakhta is signed at the border city of Kyakhta, between Russia and China, by representatives of the Tsar Peter II, and the Emperor Yongzheng.

=== July–September ===
- July 14 – The First Kamchatka Expedition, led by Vitus Bering and his crew sail northward on the ship Archangel Gabriel from the Kamchatka Peninsula, through the Bering Strait, and round Cape Dezhnev.
- July 17 – At the age of 8, Prince Teruhito, son of Emperor Nakamikado, is named as the Crown Prince of Japan. Teruhito becomes the Emperor Sakuramachi at age 15, upon his father's death.
- July 18 – After a reign of only four months, Abdalmalik is deposed as Sultan of Morocco by his half-brother Ahmad ad Dahabi, whom he had deposed on March 13. Abdalmalik is later captured and executed on March 2, 1729.
- July 23 – At the conclusion of the Szeged witch trials in the city of the same name in Hungary, six men and six women are burned at the stake on the island of Boszorkány Sziget (Hungarian for "Witch Island").
- August 16 – Because of advancing Arctic ice, the First Kamchatka Expedition turns around after Vitus Bering concludes (inaccurately) that it had reached the easternmost point of Russia and Asia, and fails to spot the coast of Alaska because of the weather.
- August 29 – The City of Nuuk is founded in Greenland, as Fort Godt-Haab, by royal governor Claus Paarss.
- September 15 – Persian physician Mohammad Mehdi ibn Ali Naqi completes Zad al-musafirin, his treatise for travelers to Persia on preservation of their health. He notes the date as a postscript in his manual.
- September 18 – John Deane, a colonial administrator of Britain's British East India Company, returns to Calcutta (Kolkata) after an absence of more than two years, and takes office at Fort William to return to administering the Bengal Presidency, an area now covering the Indian state of West Bengal and the nation of Bangladesh.
- Late Summer – Voltaire ends his exile in England.

=== October–December ===
- October 20–23 – The Copenhagen Fire of 1728 (the largest in the Danish city's history) burns.
- November 25 – In India, the Maratha Empire's army invades the Mughal Empire's Malwa province, crossing the Narmada River. On November 29, the two armies clash at the Battle of Amjhira; the Maratha troops, commanded by General Chimaji Appa, overcome the defenders of Malwa (now part of India's Andhra Pradesh state) and Malwa's Governor Girdhar Bahadur is killed.
- December 25 – William Burnet, the British Governor of the Province of Massachusetts Bay since July 19, is appointed by King George II to be the Governor of the Province of New Hampshire as well, governing both future U.S. states simultaneously until September 7. Up until July, Burnet had been Governor of both New York and New Jersey since 1720.

=== Date unknown ===
- English astronomer James Bradley uses stellar aberration (first observed in 1725) to calculate the speed of light, and observes nutation of the Earth's axis.

=== January–March ===
- January 8 – Frederick, the eldest son of King George II of Great Britain is made Prince of Wales at the age of 21, a few months after he comes to Britain for the first time after growing up in Hanover. For 23 years, Frederick is heir apparent to the British throne, but dies of a lung injury in 1751.
- January 19 – At the age of 14, Joseph (José), Prince of Brazil, son of King John V of Portugal, is married to the 10-year-old Princess Mariana Victoria of Spain, eldest daughter of King Philip V of Spain. In 1750, the couple become King Joseph I and Queen Consort Mariana Victoria of Spain.
- February 14 – King Philip V of Spain issues a royal cedula, directing an effort to offer incentives to families from the Canary Islands for settlements in New Spain north of the Rio Grande in the modern-day U.S. state of Texas (→ Canarian Americans).
- February 24 (February 13 O.S.) – In the city of Resht in Persia, Russian and Afghani leaders sign a peace treaty, with General Vasily Levashev for Russia and Muhammad Saidal Khan for Afghanistan.
- February 25 – James Oglethorpe, a member of the British House of Commons, begins service as the Chairman of the Gaols Committee to investigate the conditions of Britain's jails and prisons after the death in Fleet Prison of his friend, Robert Castell. The Oglethorpe Committee's report propels Oglethorpe to fame and leads to the beginning of British penal reforms.
- March 5 – Abdallah of Morocco becomes the new Sultan of Morocco upon the death of his half-brother, Abu'l Abbas Ahmad. Sultan Abdallah reigns for five years before being deposed for the first time, then returns to the throne five more times between 1736 and 1757.
- March 19 – John of Nepomuk (Jan Nepomucký) of Bohemia is canonized by Pope Benedict XIII more than 300 years after being tortured and drowned in 1393 by order of King Wenceslaus IV; John becomes patron saint of Roman Catholics in the Czech Republic.
- March 23 – Johann Sebastian Bach's First Köthen Funeral music premieres at St. Jakob, Köthen, in honor of the funeral of his former employer Leopold, Prince of Anhalt-Köthen. The next morning, Bach's funeral cantata Klagt, Kinder, klagt es aller Welt, BWV 244a premieres at St. Jakob, marking the same occasion.

=== April–June ===
- April 3 – Benjamin Franklin, aged 23, writes the essay "A Modest Enquiry Into the Nature and Necessity of Paper Currency" and later applies the economic principles to backing of paper money used in the United States.
- April 15 – Johann Sebastian Bach's St Matthew Passion, BWV 244b is performed again, at St. Thomas Church, Leipzig.
- April 26 – For the first time in its history, the British House of Commons is adjourned for lack of a quorum. On January 5, 1640, it had first fixed the number of members necessary — 40 — for parliamentary business to be transacted.
- May 8 – A fire breaks out inside the fully walled town of Haiger within the Holy Roman Empire (in the modern-day state of Hesse in Germany) and destroys all the buildings.
- May 12 – Six English pirates, including Mary Critchett, seize control of the sloop John and Elizabeth while being transported to America to complete their criminal sentences. They overpower their captors but are later captured in Chesapeake Bay by HMS Shoreham and hanged in August.
- May 17 – Caroline, Queen Consort becomes the first person to rule Great Britain as regent under the Regency Acts, beginning service as the acting monarch when her husband King George II departs Britain for Germany, where he is the Elector of Hanover. Caroline rules until George's return in October.
- June 1 – Diederik Durven becomes the new Governor-General of the Dutch East Indies (modern-day Indonesia) upon the death of Mattheus de Haan.
- June 8 – The Botanic Gardens of Pamplemousses, one of the most popular tourist attractions on the island republic of Mauritius, are started by Pierre Barmond, who sets aside thousands of acres for the purpose of preservation of the islands flora. The gardens come to occupy 97 square miles or 251 square kilometers.

=== July–September ===
- July 25 – Seven of the original eight Lords Proprietor of the Province of Carolina sell their shares back to the British crown. The 1710 division of the Province is made permanent and the area is reorganized into the Royal Colonies of North Carolina and South Carolina.
- July 27 – A fire that breaks out on this day in Constantinople destroys 12,000 houses and kills 7,000 inhabitants.
- July 30 – Baltimore, Maryland is founded.
- August 1 – The Comet of 1729, possibly the largest comet based on the absolute magnitude, on record, is discovered by Fr. Nicolas Sarrabat, a professor of mathematics at Marseille.
- September 29 – The Battle of Damghan begins as the Persian Safavid Army, commanded by General Nader Khan Afshar confronts a larger force of rebel Afghan troops commanded by the Emir Ashraf Hotak.

=== October–December ===
- October 5 – After seven days of battle, the Persians under Nader Khan Afshar make a daring attack through the center of the Emir Ashraf's battalions, killing 12,000 of the Afghans and forcing the remainder to flee, bringing an end to the Battle of Damghan.
- November 9 – The Treaty of Seville is signed between Great Britain, France, Spain and the Dutch Republic.
- November 29
  - The Natchez revolt, the worst Native American massacre to take place on Mississippi soil, occurs when Natchez people kill 138 Frenchmen, 35 French women, and 56 children at Fort Rosalie (near modern-day Natchez, Mississippi).
  - The first (wooden) Putney Bridge is completed, as the only fixed crossing of the River Thames between London Bridge and Kingston, England.
- December 2 – George Frideric Handel's famous opera Lotario is given its first performance, premiering at the King's Theatre in London.
- December 12 – Under the pretense of a peace offering, the Yazoo and Koroa warriors enter the French settlement at Fort St. Pierre (near modern-day Vicksburg, Mississippi) and kill most of the inhabitants.

=== Date unknown ===
- The third oldest settlement in Mississippi, Port Gibson, is founded by French settlers.
- Jonathan Swift (anonymously) publishes his satire A Modest Proposal.

== Births ==
1720

- January 2 – José de Gálvez, Spanish politician (d. 1787)
- January 4 – Johann Friedrich Agricola, German composer (d. 1774)
- January 13 – Richard Hurd, English bishop and writer (d. 1808)
- January 27 – Samuel Foote, English dramatist and actor (d. 1777)
- January 30 – Charles De Geer, Swedish industrialist, entomologist (d. 1778)
- February 8 – Emperor Sakuramachi of Japan (d. 1750)
- February 15 – Philippe Macquer, French historian (d. 1770)
- March 9 – Philip Yorke, 2nd Earl of Hardwicke, English politician (d. 1790)
- March 13 – Charles Bonnet, Swiss naturalist and writer (d. 1793)
- March 15 – Philip, Duke of Parma, Spanish prince (d. 1765)
- March 22 – Nicolas-Henri Jardin, French architect (d. 1799)
- April 23 – Vilna Gaon, Lithuanian rabbi (d. 1797)
- May 8 – William Cavendish, 4th Duke of Devonshire, Prime Minister of the United Kingdom (d. 1764)
- May 15 – Maximilian Hell, Slovakian astronomer (d. 1792)
- July 18 – Gilbert White, English naturalist and cleric (d. 1793)
- August 8 – Carl Fredrik Pechlin, Swedish politician (d. 1796)
- August 12 – Konrad Ekhof, German actor (d. 1778)
- August 18 – Laurence Shirley, 4th Earl Ferrers, English murderer (d. 1760)
- August 30 – Samuel Whitbread, English brewer, politician (d. 1796)
- October 3 – Johann Peter Uz, German poet (d. 1796)
- October 4 – Giovanni Battista Piranesi, Italian artist (d. 1778)
- October 8 – Jonathan Mayhew, American minister, patriot (d. 1766)
- October 8 – Geneviève Thiroux d'Arconville, French novelist, translator and chemist (d. 1805)
- October 19 – John Woolman, American Quaker preacher, abolitionist (d. 1772)
- November 1 – Toussaint-Guillaume Picquet de la Motte, French admiral (d. 1791)
- November 8 – Madeleine de Puisieux, French writer and active feminist (d. 1798)
- November 16 – Carlo Antonio Campioni, French-born composer (d. 1788)
- December 14 – Justus Möser, German statesman (d. 1794)
- December 24 – Anna Maria Mozart (née Pertl; d. 1778), wife of Leopold Mozart and mother of Wolfgang Amadeus Mozart and Maria Anna Mozart
- December 26 – Gian Francesco Albani, Italian Catholic cardinal (d. 1803)
- December 31 – Charles Edward Stuart, pretender to the British throne (d. 1788)

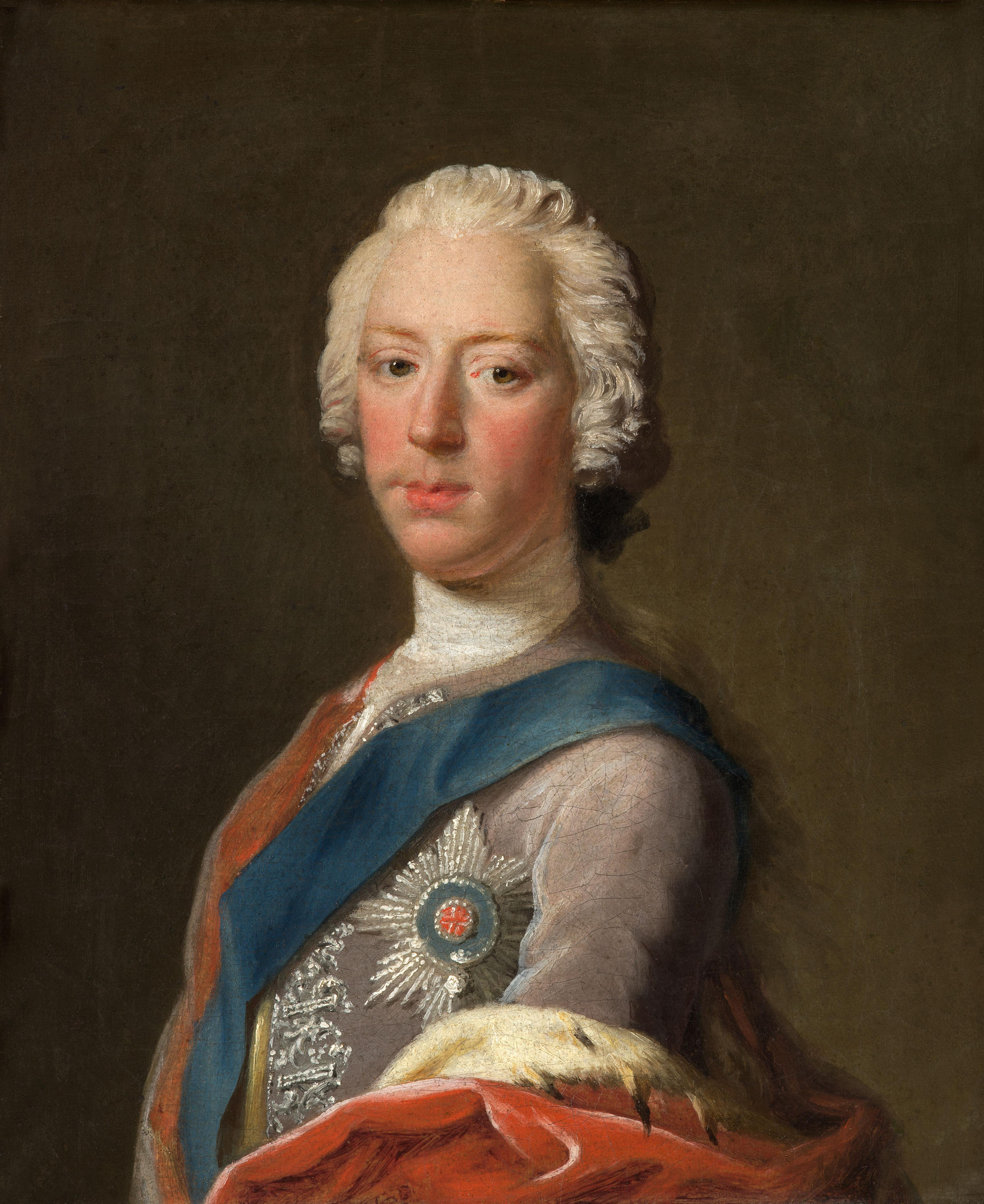
Charles Edward Stuart

- "date unknown" – Jane Gomeldon, English writer, poet and adventurer (d. 1779)
- "date unknown" – Sheikh Lamech, Persian banker and accountant (d. 1813)
- "date unknown" – Madame de Beaumer, French editor and writer (d. 1766)

1721

- January 10 – Johann Philipp Baratier, German scholar (d. 1740)
- January 11 – Anna Magdalena Godiche, Danish book printer and publisher (d. 1781)
- January 17 – Countess Palatine Elisabeth Auguste of Sulzbach, politically active Electress of Bavaria (d. 1794)
- February 3 – Friedrich Wilhelm von Seydlitz, Prussian general (d. 1773)
- February 8 – Catharina Elisabet Grubb, Finnish industrialist (d. 1788)
- February 21 – John McKinly, American physician, President of Delaware (d. 1796)
- March 8 – Elizabeth Pierrepont, Duchess of Kingston-upon-Hull, English noble (d. 1788)
- March 9 – Countess Palatine Caroline of Zweibrücken (d. 1774)
- March 19 – Tobias Smollett, Scottish physician and author (d. 1771)
- April 11 – David Zeisberger, Moravian missionary (d. 1808)
- April 14 – John Hanson, President of the Continental Congress of America (d. 1783)
- April 15 – Prince William Augustus, Duke of Cumberland, English military leader (d. 1765)

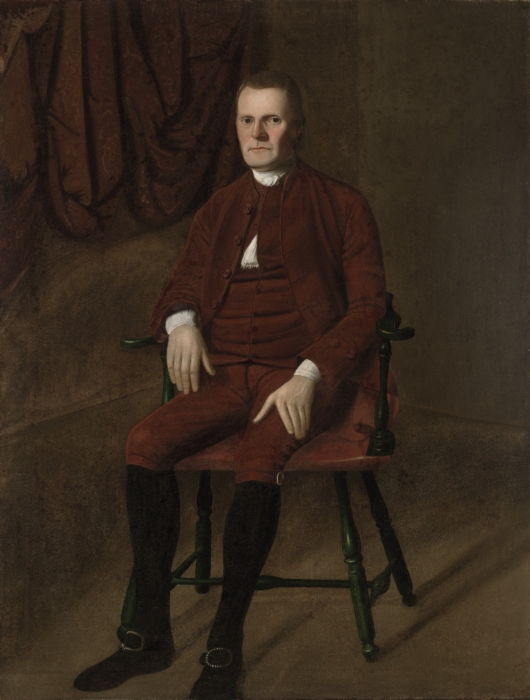
Roger Sherman

- April 19 – Roger Sherman, signer of the United States Declaration of Independence (d. 1793)
- June 19 – Johann de Kalb, Bavarian-French military officer who served as a major general in the Continental Army during the American Revolutionary War (d. 1780)
- July 9 – Johann Nikolaus Götz, German poet (d. 1781)
- July 14 – John Douglas, Scottish Anglican bishop and man of letters (d. 1807)
- August 4 – Granville Leveson-Gower, 1st Marquess of Stafford, English politician (d. 1803)
- August 31 – George Hervey, 2nd Earl of Bristol, British statesman (d. 1775)
- September 10 – Peyton Randolph, 1st and 3rd President of the Continental Congress (d. 1775)
- September 14 – Eliphalet Dyer, American statesman and judge (d. 1807)
- October 19 – Joseph de Guignes, French orientalist (d. 1800)
- November 9 – Mark Akenside, English poet and physician (d. 1770)
- November 22 – Joseph Frederick Wallet DesBarres, Swiss-born cartographer and Canadian statesman (d. 1824)
- December 6
  - James Elphinston, Scottish philologist (d. 1809)
  - Guillaume-Chrétien de Lamoignon de Malesherbes, French statesman (d. 1794)
- December 27 – François Hemsterhuis, Dutch philosopher (d. 1790)
- December 29 – Madame de Pompadour, mistress of King Louis XV of France (d. 1764)
- Date unknown – Im Yunjidang, Korean scholar, writer and neo-Confucian philosopher (d. 1793)

1722

- January 1 – Sir George Baker, 1st Baronet, British physician (d. 1809)
- January 3 – Fredrik Hasselqvist, Swedish traveller and naturalist (d. 1752)
- January 12 – Nicolas Luckner, German in French service rising to become a Marshal of France (d. 1794)
- January 15 – Herman Scholliner, German historian (d. 1795)
- January 18 – Antonio Rodríguez de Hita, Spanish composer (d. 1787)
- January 26 – Alexander Carlyle, Scottish church leader (d. 1805)
- January 29 – Duchess Luise of Brunswick-Wolfenbüttel, Prussian princess (d. 1780)
- February 3 – Duchess Louise Frederica of Württemberg, German noble (d. 1791)
- February 4 – Antonio Greppi (1722–1799), Italian banker (d. 1799)
- February 5 – Anders Rudolf du Rietz, Swedish general, count and politician (d. 1792)
- February 7 – Azar Bigdeli, Iranian anthologist and poet (d. 1781)
- February 14 – Georg Christian Füchsel, German physician and geologist (d. 1773)
- February 19 – Charles-François Tiphaigne de la Roche, French author (d. 1774)
- February 21 – Lord Robert Manners-Sutton, British politician (d. 1762)
- February 22
  - Théophile de Bordeu, French physician (d. 1776)
  - John Redman (physician), American physician (d. 1808)

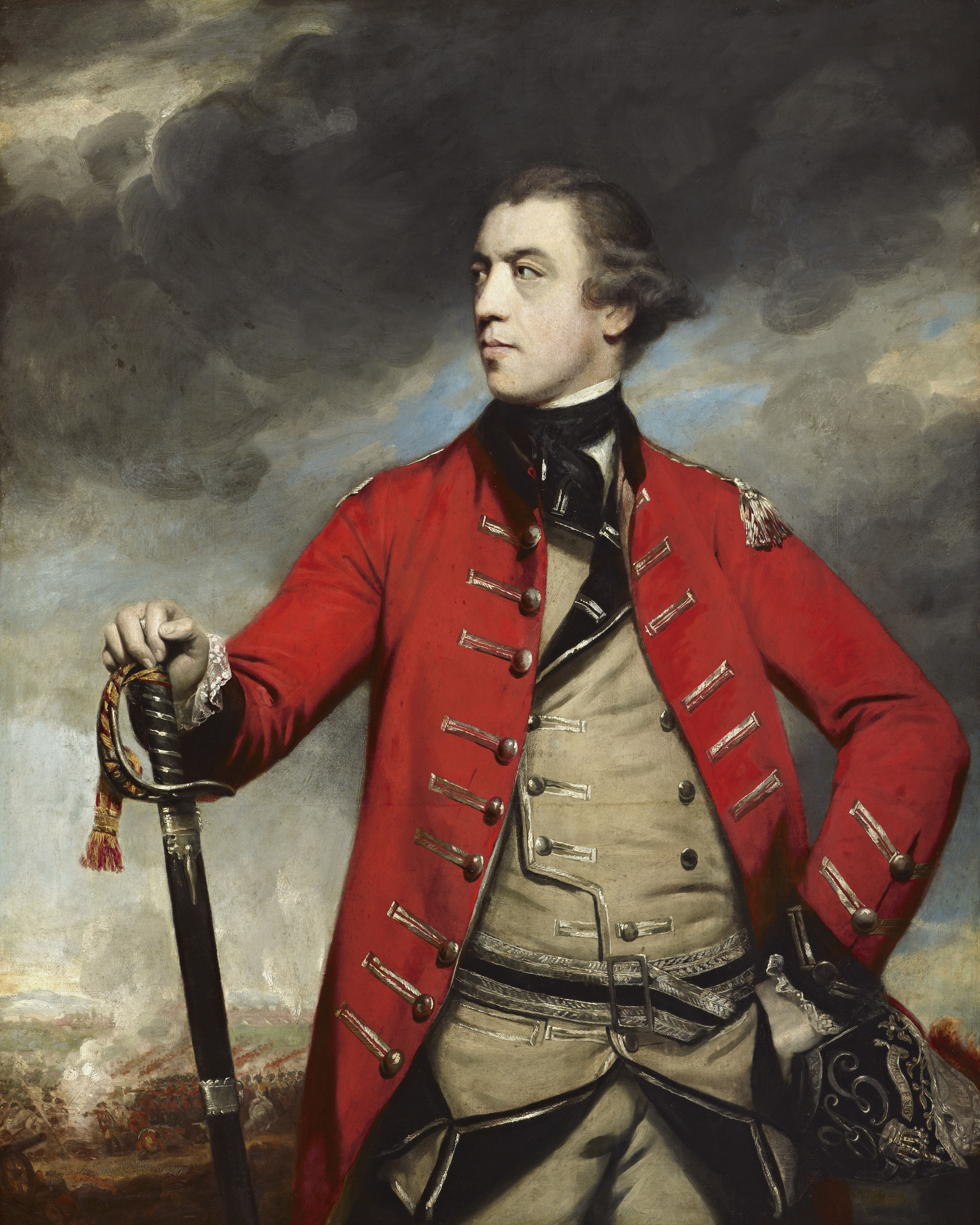
John Burgoyne

- February 24 – John Burgoyne, British army officer, playwright and politician (d. 1792)
- March 3 – Pietro Maria Gazzaniga, Italian theologian (d. 1799)
- March 6 – Johann Christian Brand, Austrian painter (d. 1795)
- March 7 – Louis-Jacques Goussier, French artist (d. 1799)
- March 15 – Gabriel Lenkiewicz, Belarusian Temporary Vicar General of the Society of Jesus (d. 1798)
- March 17 – William Wentworth, 2nd Earl of Strafford (1722–1791), England (d. 1791)
- March 18
  - Ulrika Eleonora von Düben, Swedish lady in waiting (d. 1758)
  - Heinrich XI, Prince Reuss of Greiz, German noble (d. 1800)
- March 19 – Edmund Nelson (clergyman), English priest (d. 1802)
- March 23
  - Marguerite-Thérèse Lemoine Despins, Canadian mother superior (d. 1792)
  - Jean-Baptiste Chappe d'Auteroche, French astronomer (d. 1769)
- April 8 – Jakob Friedrich Kleinknecht, German composer (d. 1794)

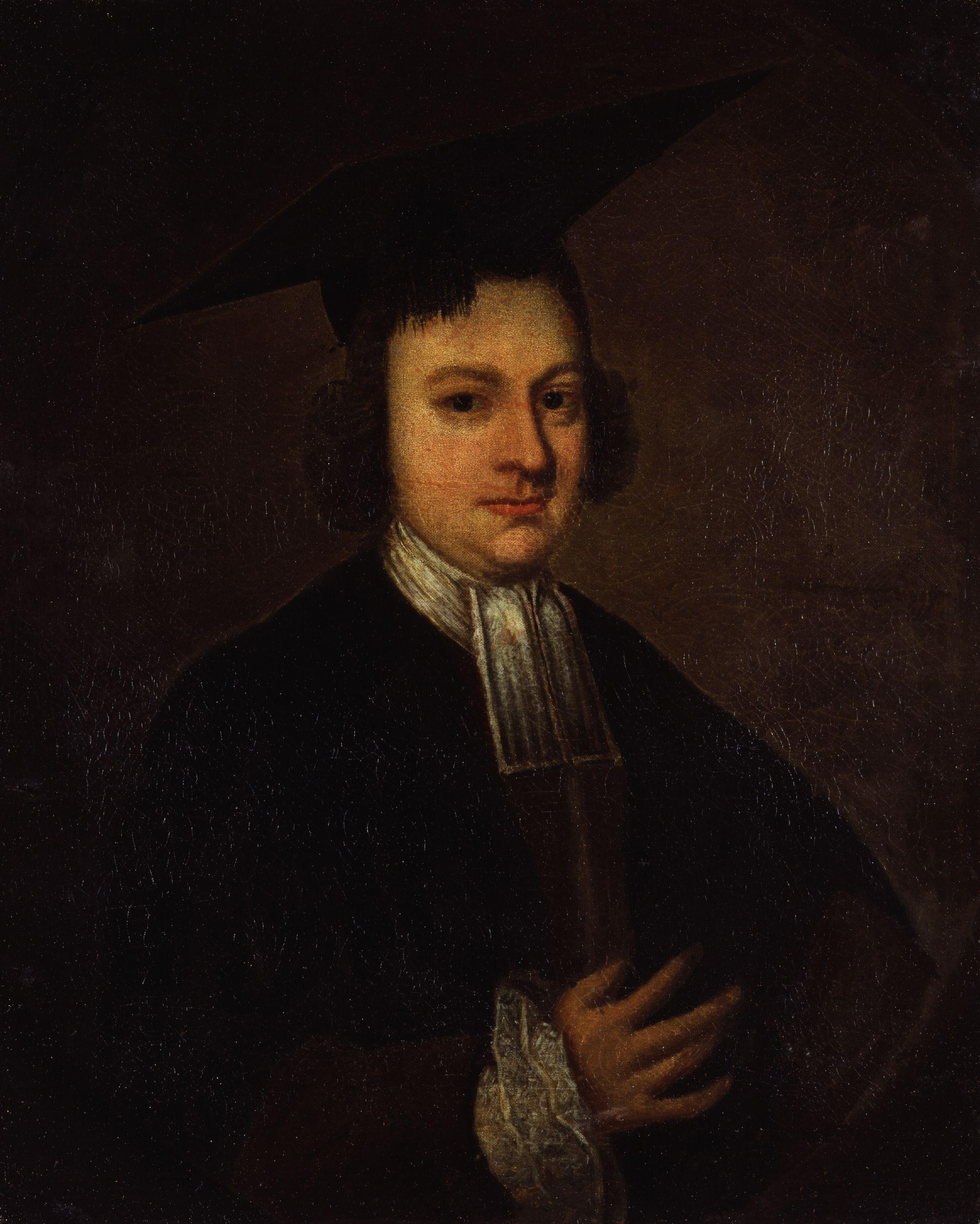
Christopher Smart

- April 11 – Christopher Smart, English poet (d. 1771)
- April 12 – Pietro Nardini, Italian composer and violinist (d. 1793)
- April 19 – Duke Clement Francis of Bavaria, German nobleman (d. 1770)
- April 22 (bapt.) – Joseph Warton, English poet and critic (d. 1800)
- April 25 – Mark Robinson (Royal Navy officer), Royal Navy admiral (d. 1799)
- April 26 – George Coventry, 6th Earl of Coventry, English noble and politician (d. 1809)
- April 29 – Francesco Carafa di Trajetto, Italian Catholic cardinal (d. 1818)
- May 2 – Gerhard Schøning, Norwegian historian (d. 1780)
- May 4
  - David Leslie, 6th Earl of Leven, British noble (d. 1802)
  - Robert McQueen, Lord Braxfield, Scottish advocate and judge (d. 1799)
- May 9 – Morgan Edwards, British historian and minister (d. 1795)
- May 11 – Petrus Camper, Dutch scientist (d. 1789)
- May 23 – Claudius Franciscus Gagnières des Granges, French martyr (d. 1792)
- May 25 – Anton Cebej, Slovenian artist (d. 1774)
- May 26 – Washington Shirley, 5th Earl Ferrers, British Royal Navy admiral (d. 1778)
- May 28 – Hugh Pigot (Royal Navy officer, born 1722), British Royal Navy admiral (d. 1792)
- May 29 – James FitzGerald, 1st Duke of Leinster (d. 1773)
- June 7 – George Paulet, 12th Marquess of Winchester, British politician (d. 1800)
- June 19 – George Gordon, 3rd Earl of Aberdeen (d. 1801)
- June 25 – St George Gore-St George, Irish politician (d. 1746)
- June 28 – Daniel Dulany the Younger, American politician (d. 1797)
- June 30 – Jiří Antonín Benda, Bohemian composer (d. 1795)
- July 1 – Vasily Dolgorukov-Krymsky, Russian general (d. 1782)
- July 11 – Prince George William of Hesse-Darmstadt, German prince (d. 1782)
- July 14 – Jean-Pierre du Teil, French general (d. 1794)
- July 16 – Joseph Wilton, English sculptor (d. 1803)
- July 21 – James Colebrooke, British baronet (d. 1761)
- July 23
  - Antoine Petit, French physician (d. 1794)
  - Anne-Catherine de Ligniville, Madame Helvétius, French salon holder (d. 1800)
- July 25 – Jakab Fellner, Hungarian architect (d. 1780)
- August 1 – Anne Marie Louise de La Tour d'Auvergne, French princess (d. 1739)
- August 5 – William Fortescue, 1st Earl of Clermont, Irish politician (d. 1806)
- August 9 – Prince Augustus William of Prussia (d. 1758)
- August 11 – Richard Brocklesby, British doctor (d. 1797)
- August 12 – Giuseppe Baldrighi, Italian painter (d. 1803)
- August 14 – Sir Thomas Dyke Acland, 7th Baronet (d. 1785)
- August 22
  - Constantine Phipps, 1st Baron Mulgrave of Ireland (d. 1775)
  - Josef Georg Hörl, Austrian politician (d. 1806)
- August 24 – John Gilbert Cooper, British poet and writer (d. 1769)
- September 1 – Karl Gotthelf von Hund, German baron (d. 1776)
- September 2
  - Vigilius Eriksen, Danish artist (died 1782)
  - William Crawford, American soldier and surveyor (died 1782)
- September 5 – Frederick Christian, Elector of Saxony (d. 1763)
- September 6 – Christian IV, Count Palatine of Zweibrücken, German noble (d. 1775)
- September 7 – Ernst Anton Nicolai, German chemist (d. 1802)
- September 13 – John Home, Scottish minister, soldier, author (d. 1808)
- September 16 – Gabriel Christie (British Army officer), British Army general (d. 1799)
- September 21 – Gisela Agnes of Anhalt-Köthen, Princess of Anhalt-Köthen by birth and by marriage Princess of Anhalt-Dessau (d. 1751)

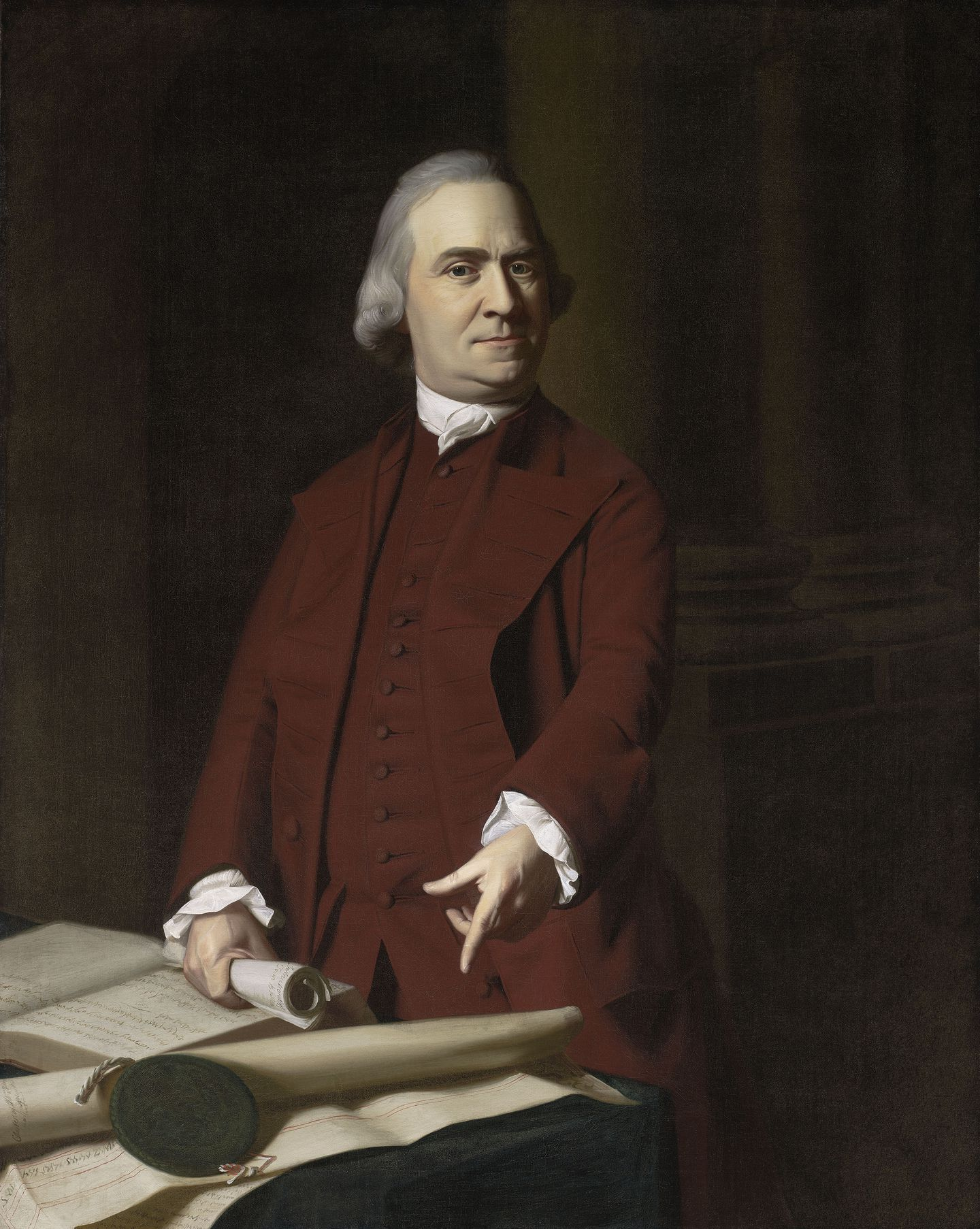
Samuel Adams

- September 27 – Samuel Adams, Boston politician, leader in the American Revolution (d. 1803)
- October 2 – Leopold Widhalm, Austrian luthier (d. 1776)
- October 3 – Johann Heinrich Tischbein, German artist (d. 1789)
- October 5 – Richard Hotham, English property developer and politician (d. 1799)
- October 10 – Humphry Marshall, American botanist (d. 1801)
- October 20 – Joachim Edler von Popper, Austrian banker (d. 1795)
- October 24 – Dominic Schram, German theologian (d. 1797)
- October 31 – Princess Ulrike Friederike Wilhelmine of Hesse-Kassel, German princess (d. 1787)
- November 4 – Raphael Cohen, German rabbi (d. 1803)
- November 5 – William Byron, 5th Baron Byron, English dueller (d. 1798)
- November 11 – Nicolas Antoine Boulanger, French philosopher (d. 1759)
- November 18 – Ichijō Michika, Japanese court noble (d. 1769)
- November 19
  - Leopold Auenbrugger, Austrian physician (d. 1809)
  - Benjamin Chew, Chief Justice of colonial Pennsylvania (d. 1810)
- November 21 – Richard Bampfylde, British politician (d. 1776)
- November 22 – Marc Antoine René de Voyer, French noble (d. 1787)
- November 25 – Heinrich Johann Nepomuk von Crantz, Luxembourgian botanist (d. 1799)
- November 30 – Théodore Gardelle, Swiss painter, enameller (d. 1761)
- December 1
  - Jean-Pierre de Bougainville, French writer (d. 1763)
  - Anna Louisa Karsch, German poet (d. 1791)
  - Dunbar Douglas, 4th Earl of Selkirk, Scottish peer (d. 1799)
- December 4 – Guillaume Piguel, French-born Apostolic Vicar of Cochin (d. 1771)
- December 12 – Charles Wallop, British politician (d. 1771)
- December 20 – Joseph O'Donnell Sr., Irish soldier (d. 1787)
- December 24 – Sampson Sammons, American army officer (d. 1796)
- December 28
  - John Pitcairn, British Marine officer who was stationed in Boston (d. 1775)
  - Eliza Lucas, American agronomist (d. 1793)
- December 30 – Charles Yorke, Lord Chancellor of Great Britain (d. 1770)
- date unknown – Flora MacDonald, Scottish heroine (d. 1790)
- probable – Hyder Ali, Indian general, Sultan of Mysore (d. 1782)

1723

- January 5 – Nicole-Reine Lepaute, French astronomer, mathematician (d. 1788)
- January 11 – Prithvi Narayan Shah, First Monarch of Nepal (d. 1775)
- January 12 – Samuel Langdon, American President of Harvard University (d. 1797)
- January 31 – Petronella Johanna de Timmerman, Dutch poet, scientist (d. 1786)
- February 15 – John Witherspoon, American signer of the Declaration of Independence (d. 1794)
- February 17 – Tobias Mayer, German astronomer (d. 1761)
- February 21 – Louis-Pierre Anquetil, French historian (d. 1808)
- February 23 – Richard Price, Welsh philosopher (d. 1791)
- March 22 – Charles Carroll, American lawyer, Continental Congressman (d. 1783)
- March 25 – Catharina Mulder, Dutch organist (d. 1798)
- March 31 – King Frederick V of Denmark (d. 1766)
- April 5 – Catherine Charlotte De la Gardie, Swedish countess (d. 1763)
- April 20 – Cornelius Harnett, American Continental Congressman (d. 1781)
- April 30 – Mathurin Jacques Brisson, French naturalist (d. 1806)
- June 3 – Giovanni Antonio Scopoli, Italian-born physician, naturalist (d. 1788)
- June 11 – Johann Georg Palitzsch, German astronomer (d. 1788)

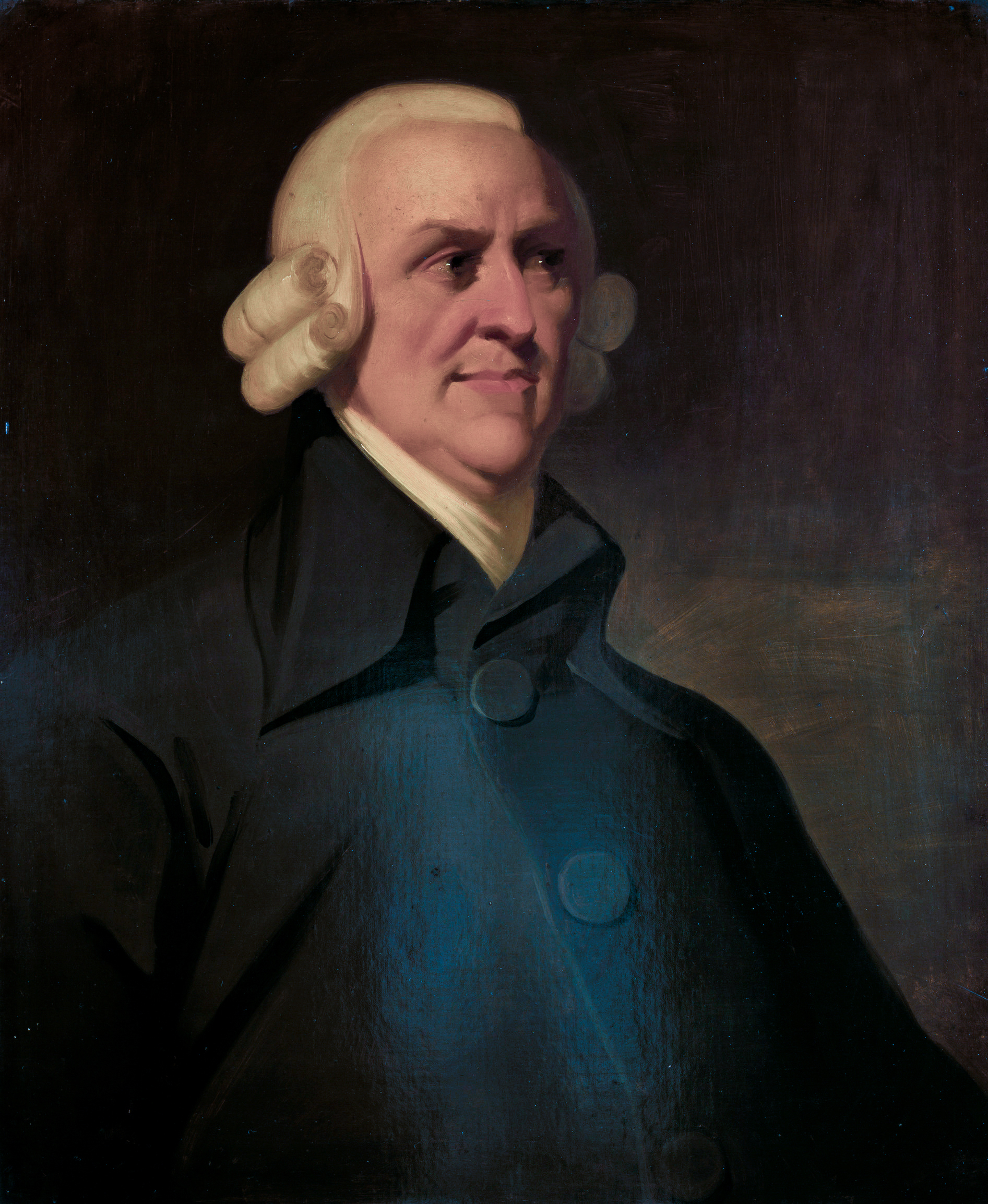
Adam Smith

- June 16 – (baptised) Adam Smith, Scottish economist, philosopher (d. 1790)
- June 20
  - Adam Ferguson, Scottish philosopher, historian (d. 1816)
  - Theophilus Lindsey, English theologian (d. 1808)
- July 1 – Pedro Rodríguez, Count of Campomanes, Spanish statesman, writer (d. 1802)
- July 10 – William Blackstone, English jurist (d. 1780)
- July 11 – Jean-François Marmontel, French historian, writer (d. 1799)
- July 16 – Sir Joshua Reynolds, English painter (d. 1792)
- September 11 – Johann Bernhard Basedow, German educational reformer (d. 1790)
- October 4 – Nikolaus Poda von Neuhaus, German entomologist (d. 1798)
- October 11 – Hedvig Strömfelt, Swedish psalm writer (d. 1766)
- November 8 – John Byron, English admiral (d. 1786)
- November 30 – William Livingston, American politician, journalist (d. 1790)
- December 22 – Carl Friedrich Abel, German composer (d. 1787)
- December 26 – Friedrich Melchior, baron von Grimm, German writer (d. 1807)
- Date unknown
  - Carl Albert von Lespilliez, German draftsman, architect and printmaker (d. 1796)
  - Eva Merthen, Finnish political activist (d. 1811)

1724

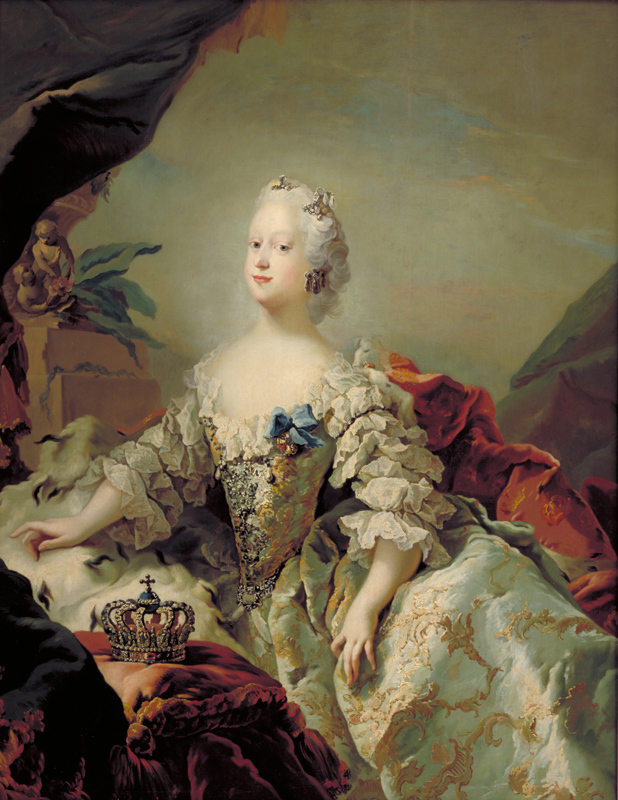
Louise of Great Britain

- January 12 – Frances Brooke, English writer (d. 1789)
- February 16 – Christopher Gadsden, American statesman (d. 1805)
- February 28 – George Townshend, 1st Marquess Townshend, British field marshal (d. 1807)
- February 29 – Eva Marie Veigel, Austrian-born English ballet dancer, known as La Violette (d. 1822)
- March 1 – Manuel do Cenáculo, Portuguese prelate and antiquarian (d. 1814)
- March 6 – Henry Laurens, political leader during the American Revolutionary War, father of John Laurens (d. 1792)
- March 27 – Jane Colden, American botanist (d. 1766)
- April 12 – Lyman Hall, American signer of the Declaration of Independence (d. 1790)
- April 22 – Immanuel Kant, German philosopher (d. 1804)
- May 7 – Dagobert Sigmund von Wurmser, Alsatian-born Austrian general (d. 1797)
- May 19 – Augustus Hervey, 3rd Earl of Bristol, British admiral, politician (d. 1779)
- June 8 – John Smeaton, English civil engineer (d. 1792)
- June 15 – Countess Palatine Maria Franziska of Sulzbach, German aristocrat (d. 1794)
- July 2 – Friedrich Gottlieb Klopstock, German poet (d. 1803)
- July 10 – Eva Ekeblad, Swedish scientist (d. 1786)
- August 3 – Alvise Foscari, Venetian admiral (d. 1790)
- August 23 – Abraham Yates, American Continental Congressman (d. 1796)
- August 25 – George Stubbs, English painter (d. 1806)
- August 27 – John Joachim Zubly, Swiss-born Continental Congressman (d. 1781)
- September 3 – Guy Carleton, 1st Baron Dorchester, British soldier and Governor of Quebec (d. 1808)
- December 12 – Samuel Hood, 1st Viscount Hood, British admiral (d. 1816)
- December 13 – Franz Aepinus, German scientist (d. 1802)
- December 18 – Louise of Great Britain, queen of Frederick V of Denmark (d. 1751)
- December 24 – Johann Conrad Ammann, Swiss physician, naturalist (d. 1811)
- December 25 – John Michell, English scientist and geologist (d. 1793)
- December 28 – Christoph Franz von Buseck, Prince-Bishop of Bamberg (d. 1805)
- December 30 – Louis-Jean-François Lagrenée, French painter (d. 1805)
- Date unknown
  - Marie Anne Victoire Pigeon, French mathematician (d. 1767)
  - James MacLaine, Irish highwayman (d. 1750)

1725

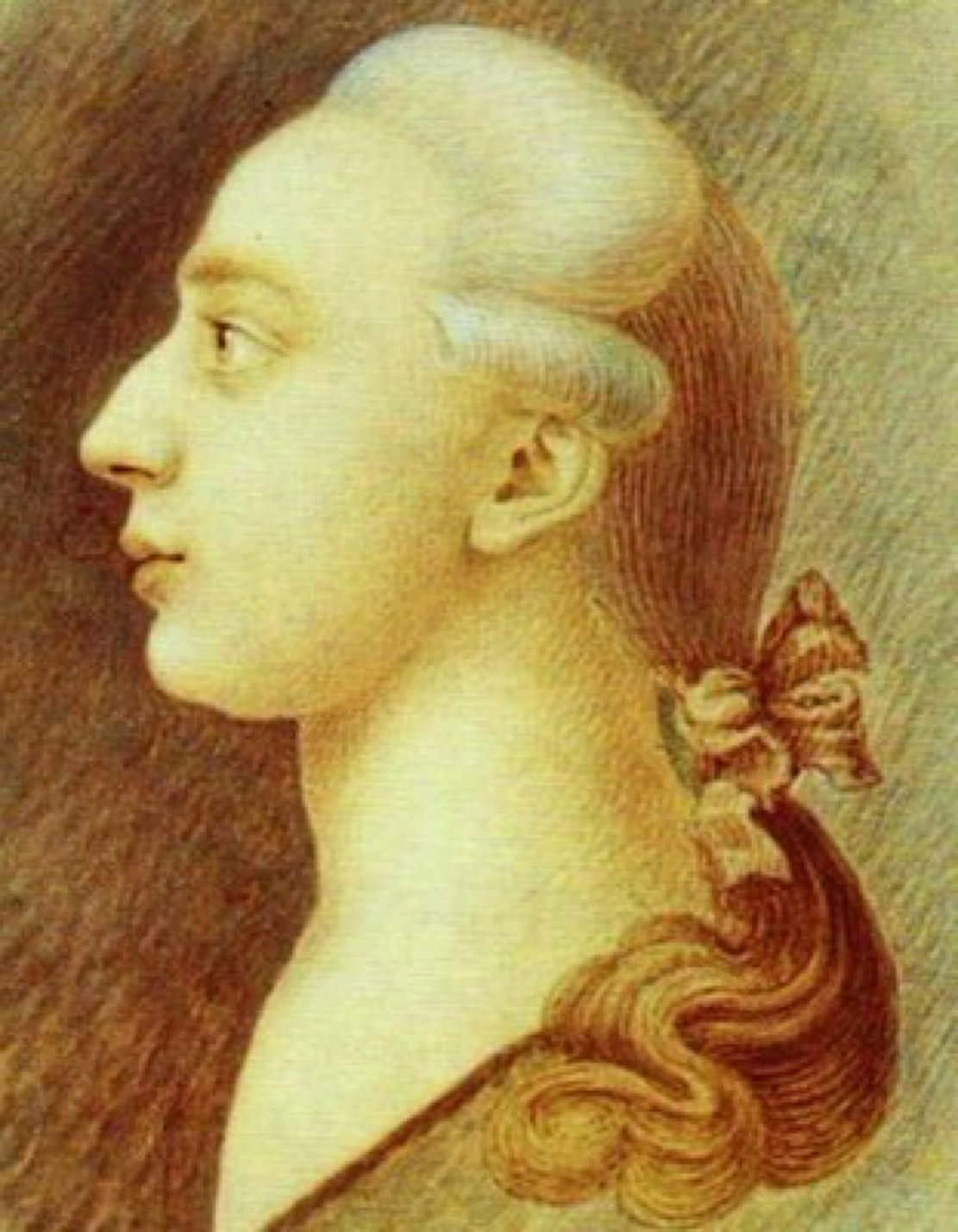
Giacomo Casanova

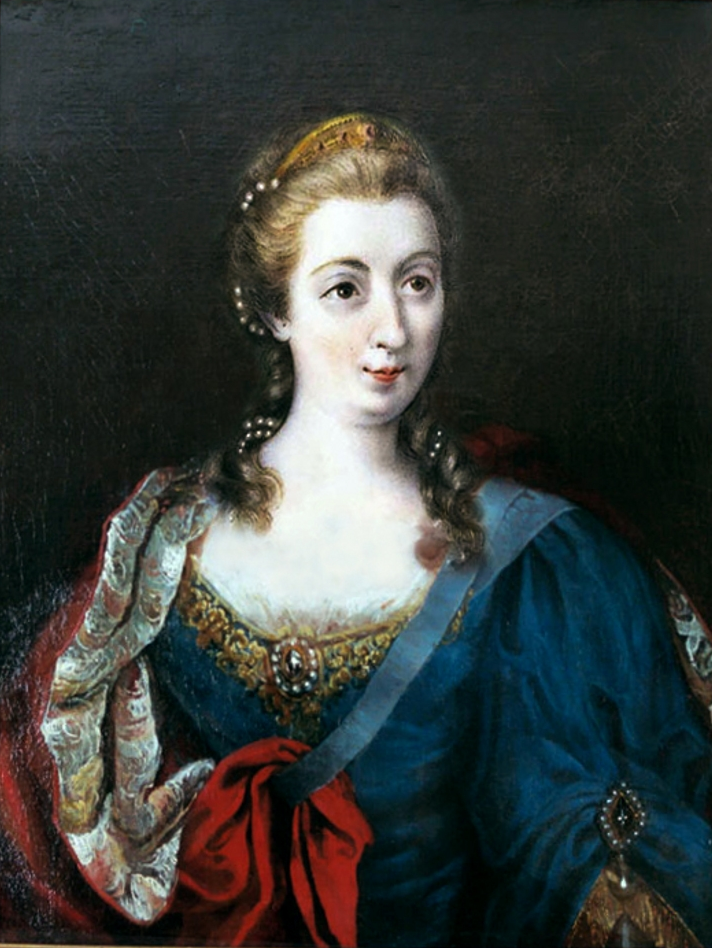
Maria Teresa Cybo-Malaspina, Duchess of Massa

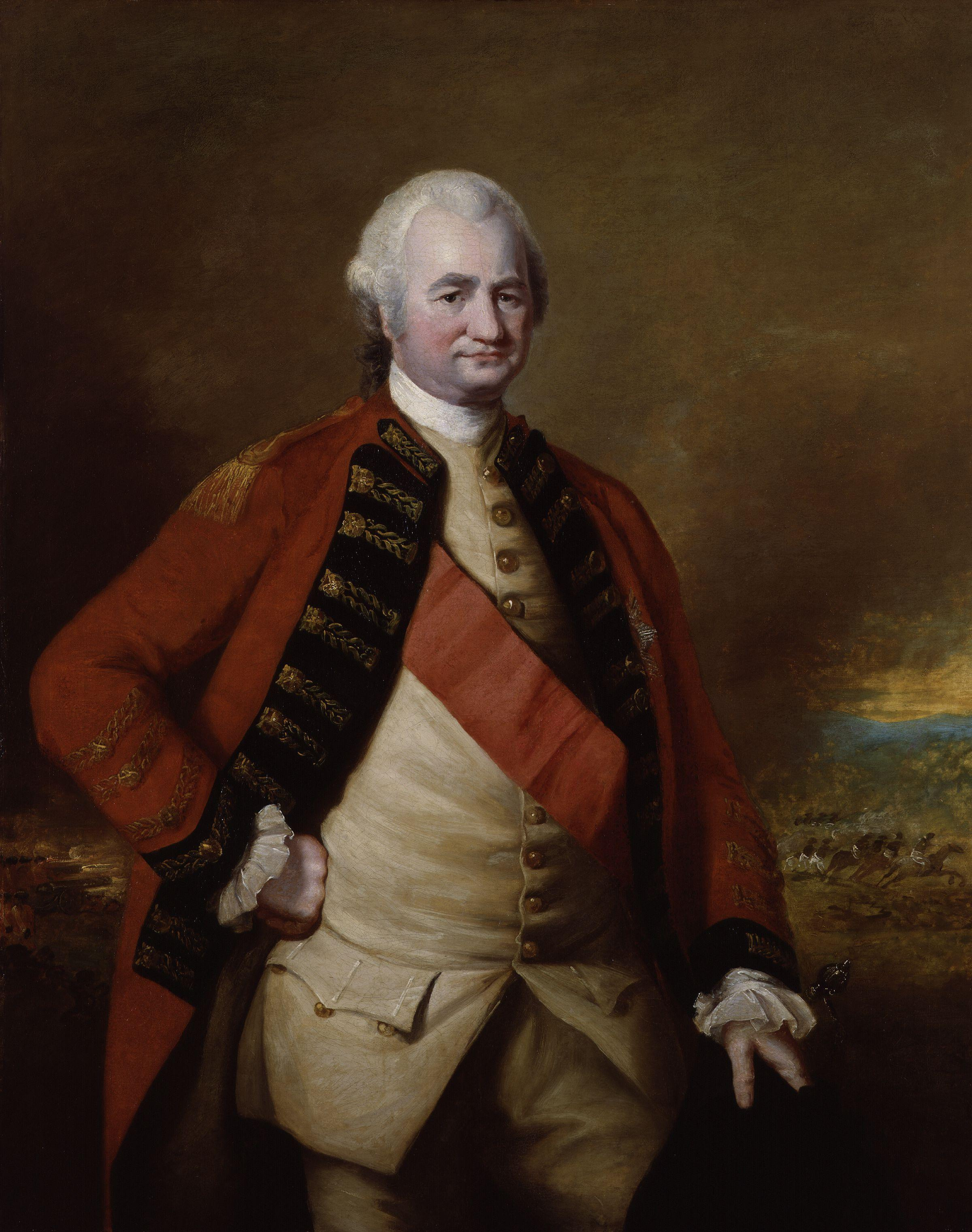
Robert Clive

- January 25 – Antoine Court de Gébelin, French pastor (d. 1784)
- February 4 – Dru Drury, English entomologist (d. 1803)
- February 5
  - James Otis, American lawyer, patriot (d. 1783)
  - Anna Maria Rückerschöld, Swedish author (d. 1805)
- February 15 – Abraham Clark, American signer of the Declaration of Independence (d. 1794)
- February 25 – Karl Wilhelm Ramler, German poet (d. 1798)
- February 26 – Nicolas-Joseph Cugnot, French steam vehicle pioneer (d. 1804)
- March 6 – Henry Benedict Stuart, Italian-born cardinal, Jacobite claimant to the British throne (d. 1807)
- March 17 – Lachlan McIntosh, Scottish-born American military and political leader (d. 1806)
- March 20 – Abdul Hamid I, Ottoman Sultan (d. 1789)
- March 24
  - Samuel Ashe, Governor of North Carolina (d. 1813)
  - Thomas Cushing, American Continental Congressman (d. 1788)
- March 28 – Andrew Kippis, English non-conformist clergyman, biographer (d. 1795)
- April 2 – Giacomo Casanova, Italian adventurer, writer (d. 1798)
- April 6 – Pasquale Paoli, Corsican patriot, military leader (d. 1807)
- April 23 – Gerard Majella, Italian Catholic lay brother and saint (d. 1755)
- April 25 – Augustus Keppel, 1st Viscount Keppel, British admiral (d. 1786)
- May 4 – Johan August Meijerfeldt the Younger, Swedish field marshal (d. 1800)
- May 12 – Louis Philippe I, Duke of Orléans, French soldier, writer (d. 1785)
- May 25 – Samuel Ward, American politician (d. 1776)
- June 29 – Maria Teresa Cybo-Malaspina, Duchess of Massa, Italian ruler (d. 1790)
- July 1 – Rhoda Delaval, English portrait painter (d. 1757)
- July 4
  - Jean-Baptiste Luton Durival, French historian, diplomat and Encyclopédiste (d. 1810)
  - Jean-Baptiste Donatien de Vimeur, comte de Rochambeau, French soldier (d. 1807)
- July 24 – John Newton, English cleric and hymnist (d. 1807)
- August 21 – Jean-Baptiste Greuze, French painter (d. 1805)
- August 29 – Charles Townshend, English politician (d. 1767)
- September 5 – Jean-Étienne Montucla, French mathematician (d. 1799)
- September 12 – Guillaume Le Gentil, French astronomer (d. 1792)
- September 16
  - Nicolas Desmarest, French geologist (d. 1815)
  - Anna Barbara Gignoux, German industrialist (d. 1796)
- September 24 – Arthur Guinness, Irish brewer (d. 1803)
- September 29 – Robert Clive, British general, statesman (d. 1774)
- October 12 – Étienne Louis Geoffroy, French pharmacist, entomologist (d. 1810)
- October 21 – Franz Moritz Graf von Lacy, Austrian field marshal (d. 1801)
- December 11 – George Mason, American founding father (d. 1792)
- December 18 – Johann Salomo Semler, German historian, Bible commentator (d. 1791)
- December 23 – Ahmad Shah Bahadur, 14th Mughal Emperor (d. 1775)
- date unknown – Magdalena Dávalos y Maldonado, Ecuadorian scholar, socialite (d. 1806)

1726

- January 14 – Jacques-Donatien Le Ray, French supporter of the American Revolution (d. 1803)
- January 17 – Hugh Mercer, brigadier general in the American Continental Army, and a close friend to George Washington (d. 1777)
- February 4 – Jean-Jacques Blaise d'Abbadie, Director-general of the Colony of Louisiana (d. 1765)
- February 7 – Margaret Fownes-Luttrell, British painter (d. 1766)
- March 8 – Richard Howe, British admiral (d. 1799)
- April 5 – Benjamin Harrison V, signer of the American Declaration of Independence (d. 1791)
- April 8 – Lewis Morris, American landowner and developer, signer of the United States Declaration of Independence (d. 1798)
- April 12 – Charles Burney, English music historian (d. 1814)
- April 20 – Joseph de Ferraris, Austrian cartographer of the Austrian Netherlands (d. 1814)

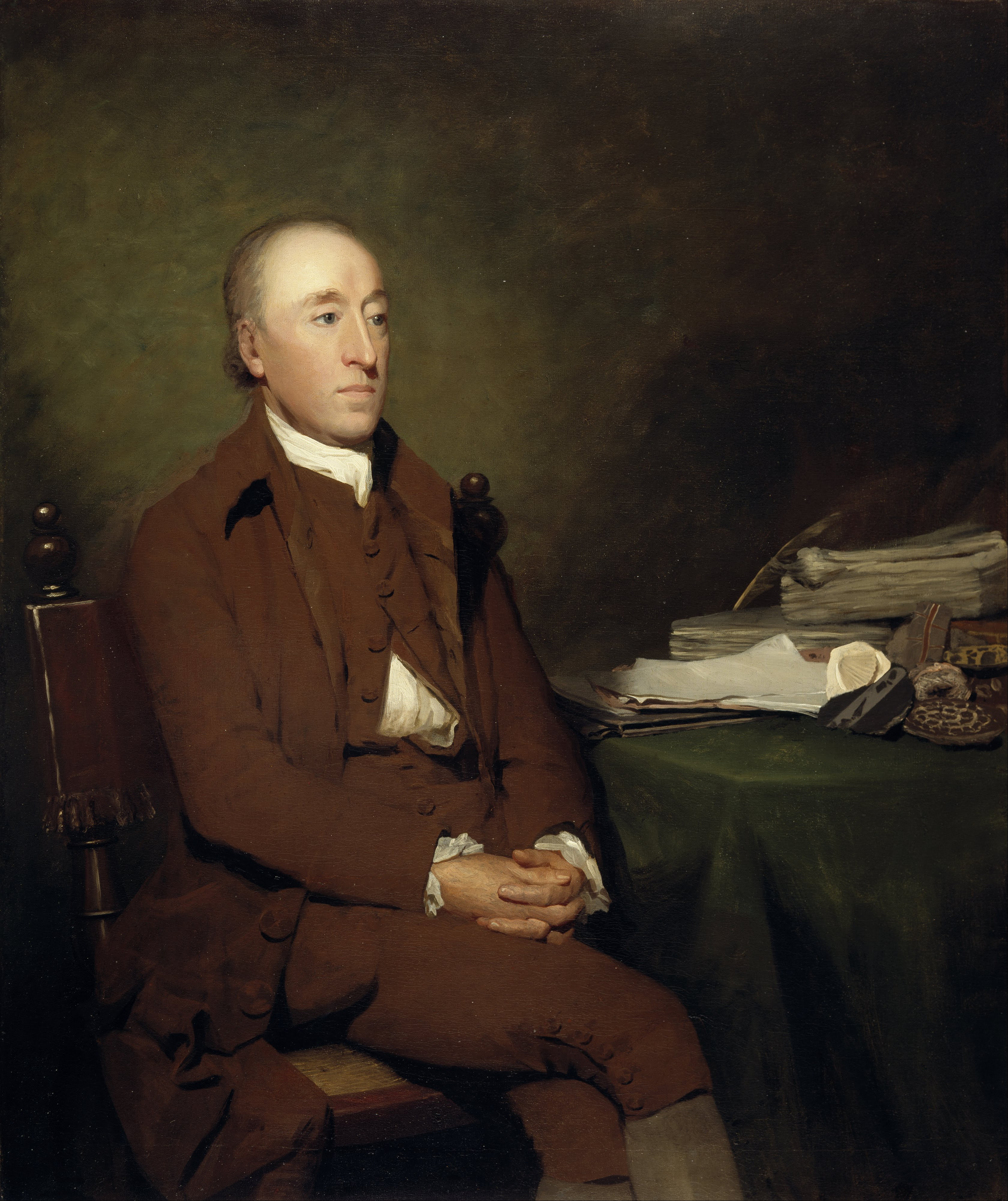
James Hutton

- June 3 O.S. – James Hutton, Scottish geologist (d. 1797)
- June 14 O.S. – Thomas Pennant, Welsh naturalist (d. 1798)
- June 20 – Louise Henriette of Bourbon, Duchess of Orléans, mother of Philippe Égalité (d. 1759)
- June 25 – Lady Anne Monson, English botanist (d. 1776)
- July 1 – Acharya Bhikshu, Jain saint (d. 1803)
- July 30 – William Jones (1726–1800), British clergyman, author (d. 1800)
- August 7 – James Bowdoin, American Revolutionary leader, politician (d. 1790)
- August 9 – Francesco Cetti, Italian Jesuit scientist (d. 1778)
- August 2 – Lê Quý Đôn, Vietnamese philosopher, poet, encyclopedist and government official (d. 1784)
- September 1 – François-André Danican Philidor, French composer, chess player (d. 1795)
- September 2 – John Howard (prison reformer), English philanthropist (d. 1790)
- September 26 – John H. D. Anderson, Scottish scientist (d. 1796)
- September 26 – Angelo Maria Bandini, Italian librarian (d. 1803)
- October 16 – Daniel Chodowiecki, Polish painter (d. 1801)
- December 4 – Lord Stirling, American brigadier-general during the American Revolutionary War (d. 1783)
- date unknown
  - Cyprian Howe, American colonel in the American Revolutionary War (d. 1806)
  - Katsukawa Shunshō, Japanese woodblock artist (d. 1792)
  - Jedediah Strutt, English businessman (d. 1797)

1727

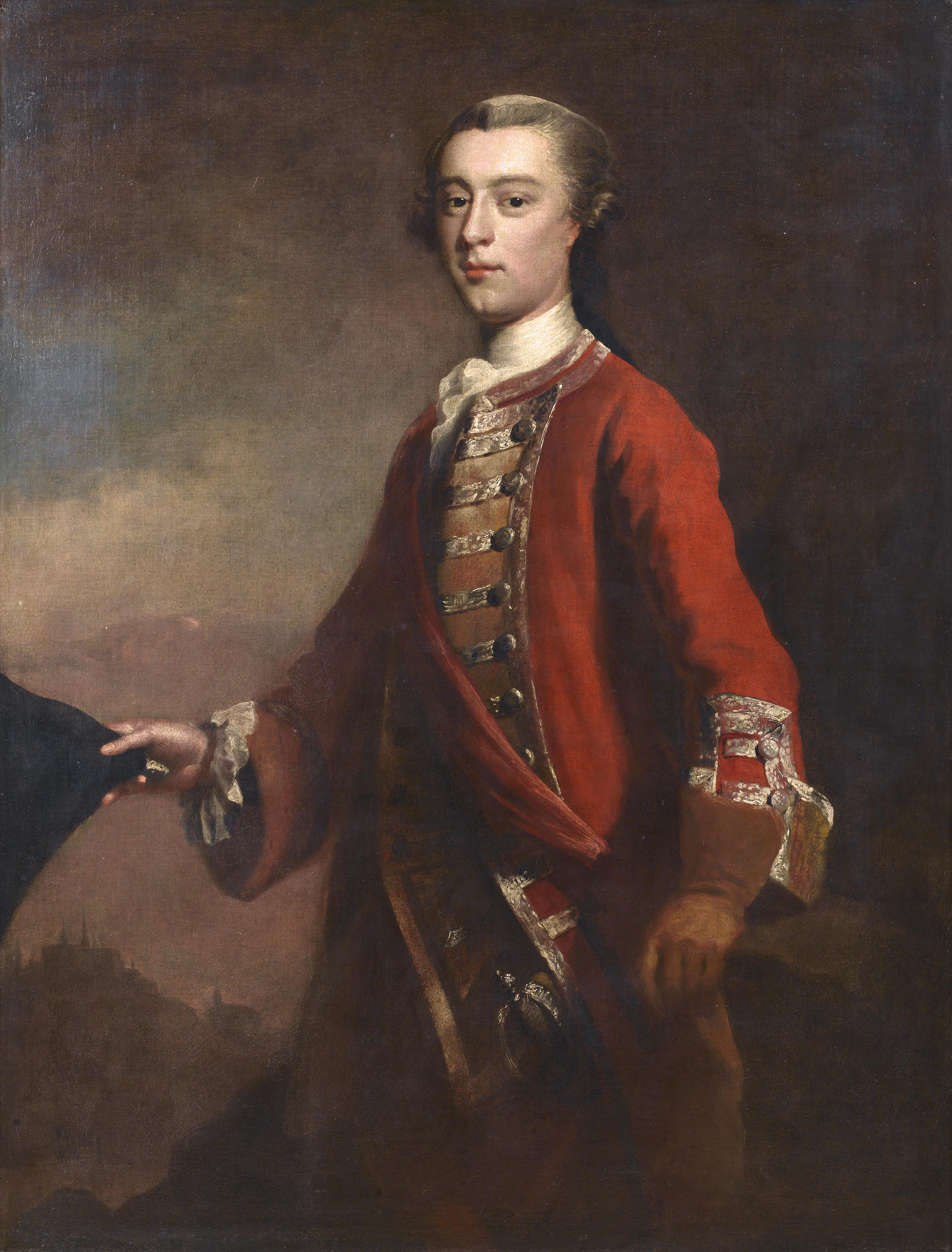
James Wolfe

- January 2 – James Wolfe, British general (d. 1759)
- January 25 – Aron Gustaf Silfversparre, Swedish baron (d. 1818)
- May 10 – Anne Robert Turgot, French statesman (d. 1781)
- May 14 – Thomas Gainsborough, English artist (d. 1788)
- July 26 – Horatio Gates, retired British soldier who served as an American general during the American Revolutionary War (d. 1806)
- August 14
  - Henriette of France, daughter of King Louis XV (d. 1752)
  - Princess Louise-Élisabeth of France, daughter of King Louis XV (d. 1759)
- August 22 – Johann Joseph Gassner, German priest (d. 1779)
- October 23 – Empress Xiaoyichun of China (d. 1775)
- November 26 – Artemas Ward, American major general (d. 1800)
- December 6 – Johann Gottfried Zinn, German anatomist, botanist (d. 1757)
- December 27 – Arthur Murphy, Irish writer (d. 1805)

1728

- January 9 – Thomas Warton, English poet (d. 1790)
- February 3 – Charles Rainsford, British general (d. 1809)
- February 21 – Emperor Peter III of Russia, husband of Catherine the Great (d. 1762)
- February 25 – John Wood, the Younger, English architect (d. 1782)
- March 28 – Anton Raphael Mengs, German-Bohemian painter (d. 1779)
- April 16 – Joseph Black, Scottish physicist and chemist (d. 1799)
- June 22 – Anna Jabłonowska, Polish magnate and politician (d. 1800)
- August 26 – Johann Heinrich Lambert, Swiss mathematician, physicist and astronomer (d. 1777)
- August 28 – John Stark, American Revolutionary War general (d. 1822)
- September 3 – Matthew Boulton, English manufacturer, lifelong key partner of James Watt (d. 1809)
- September 14 – Mercy Otis Warren, American playwright (d. 1814)
- October 5 – Chevalière d'Éon, French diplomat, spy, soldier and trans individual (d. 1810)
- October 7 – Caesar Rodney, American lawyer and signer of the Declaration of Independence (d. 1784)

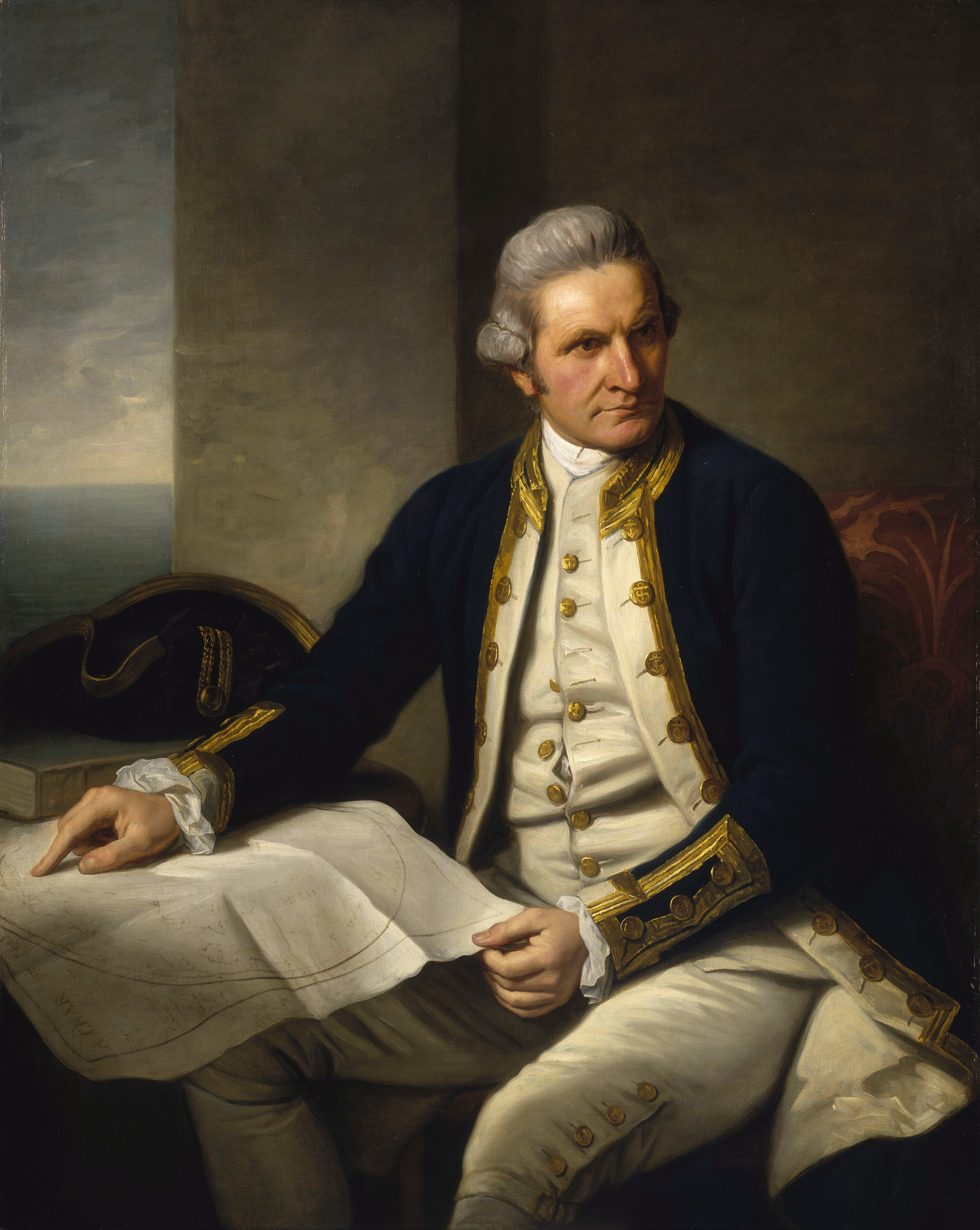
James Cook

- October 27 – James Cook, British naval commander and explorer (d. 1779)
- November 10 – Oliver Goldsmith, Irish writer (d. 1774)
- December 28 – Justus Claproth, German jurist, inventor of the de-inking process of recycled paper (d. 1805)
- date unknown
  - Josefa Ordóñez, Spanish–Mexican actress, courtesan (est. year of birth)
  - James Armstrong, American politician and Major of the Continental Army (d. 1800) (est. year of birth)
- Juan Albano Pereira Márquez godfather and tutor of Bernardo O'Higgins.

1729

- January 12
  - Lazzaro Spallanzani, Italian biologist (d. 1799)
  - Edmund Burke, Irish statesman and philosopher (d. 1797)

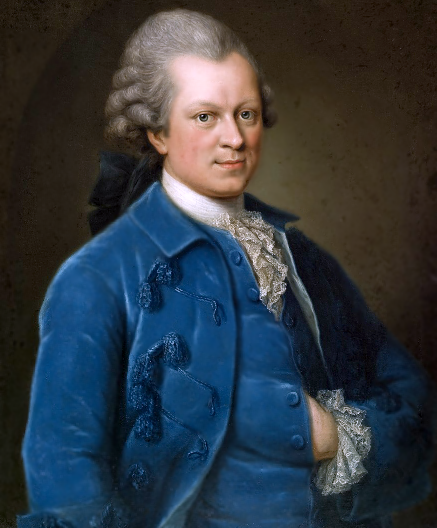
Gotthold Ephraim Lessing

- January 22 – Gotthold Ephraim Lessing, German author and philosopher (d. 1781)

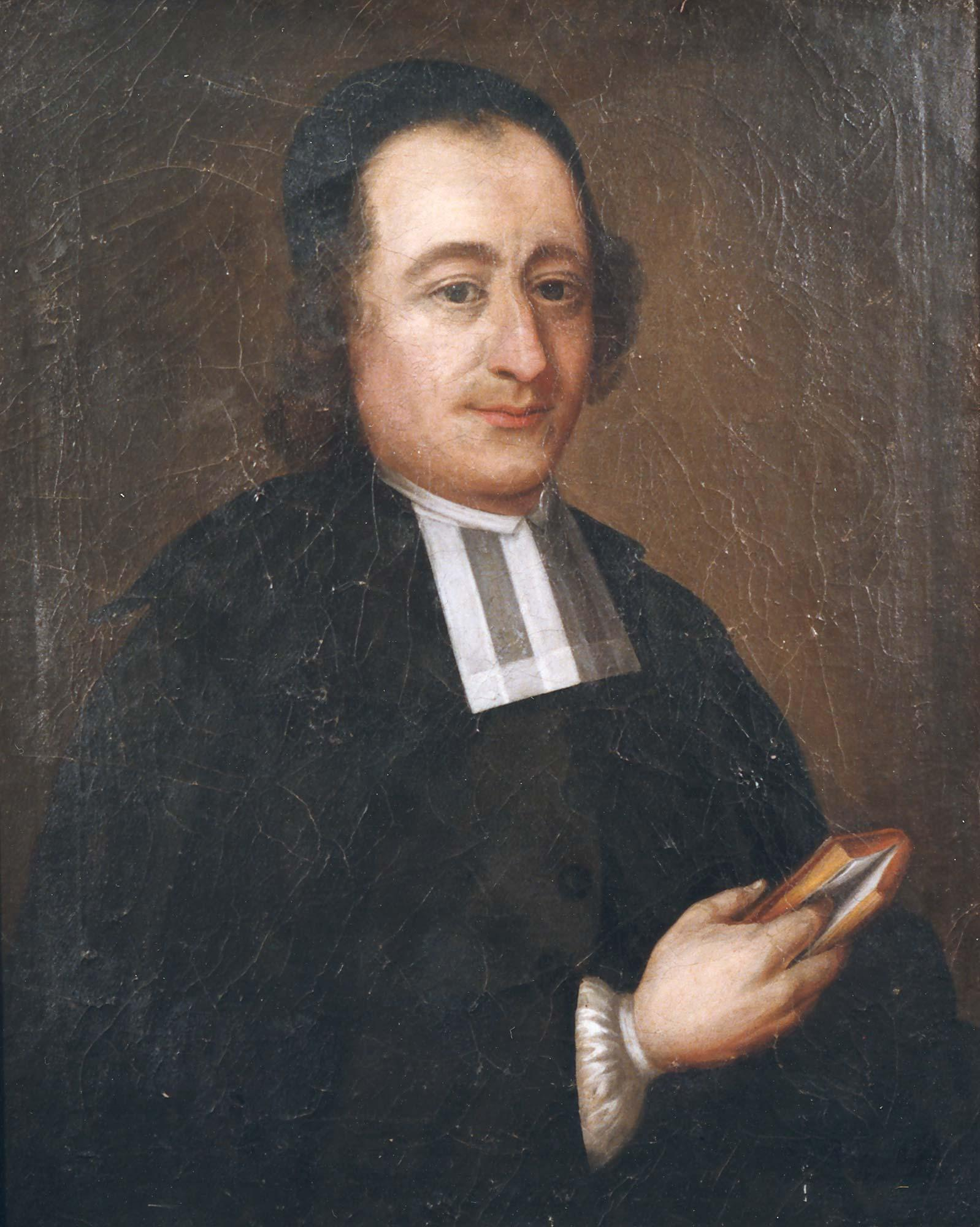
Anders Chydenius

- February 26 – Anders Chydenius, Finnish economist, liberal politician and Lutheran priest (d. 1803)

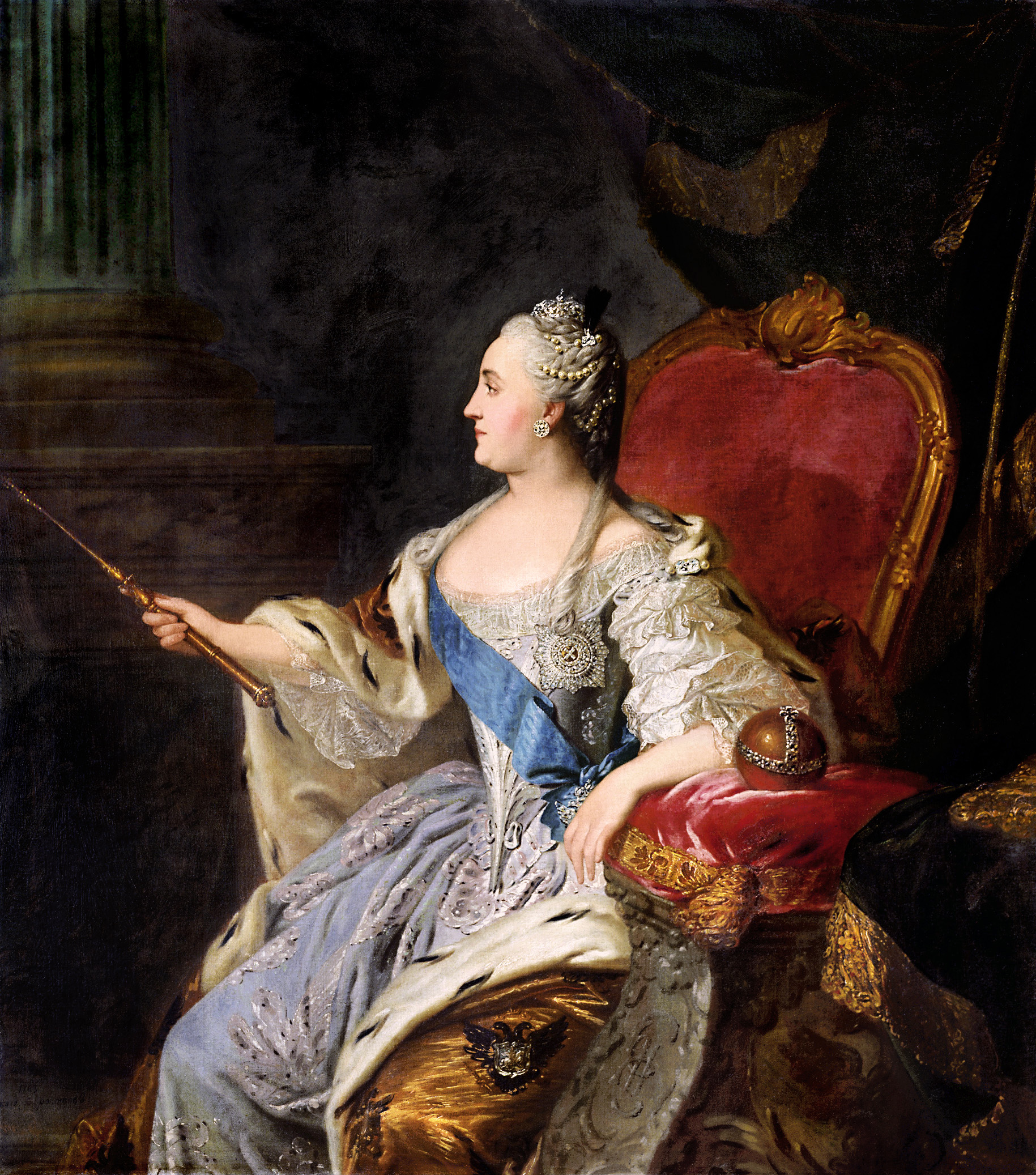
Catherine II of Russia

- May 2 – Catherine the Great, born Sophie of Anhalt-Zerbst, empress regnant of Russia (d. 1796)
- July 4 – George Leonard, American lawyer, jurist and politician (d. 1819)
- August 10 – William Howe, 5th Viscount Howe, British general (d. 1814)
- September 6 – Moses Mendelssohn, German-Jewish philosopher (d. 1786)
- September 15 – Mikiel'Ang Grima, Maltese surgeon (d. 1798)
- October 6 – Sarah Crosby, English Methodist preacher, the first female (d. 1804)
- November 17 – Maria Antonia Ferdinanda of Spain, Queen consort of Sardinia (d. 1785)
- November 21 – Josiah Bartlett, second signer of the United States Declaration of Independence (d. 1795)
- November 12 – Louis Antoine de Bougainville, French navigator and military commander (d. 1811)
- November 22 – Helena Dorothea von Schönberg, German industrialist (d. 1799)
- November 24 – Alexander Suvorov, Russian general (d. 1800)
- date unknown
  - David Barclay of Youngsbury, English merchant, businessman and banker (d. 1809)
  - Samuel Barrington, British admiral (d. 1800)
  - Mary Woffington, Irish socialite (d. 1811)

== Deaths ==
1720

- January – Francis Daniel Pastorius, founder of Germantown, Pennsylvania (b. 1651)
- January 4 – Harry Mordaunt, British politician (b. 1663)
- January 10 – Ramon Perellos, Spanish 64th Grandmaster of the Knights Hospitaller (b. 1637)
- January 12 – William Ashhurst, Lord Mayor of London (1693–1694) (b. 1647)
- January 19 – Eleonor Magdalene of Neuburg, Holy Roman Empress (b. 1655)
- January 20
  - Giovanni Maria Lancisi, Italian physician (b. 1654)
  - Angelo Paoli, Italian beatified (b. 1642)
- January 31 – Thomas Grey, 2nd Earl of Stamford, English privy councilor (b. c. 1645)
- February 4 – Robert Wroth, British politician (b. 1660)
- February 27 – Samuel Parris, English-born Puritan minister (b. 1653)
- March 6 – Pieter van Bloemen, Flemish painter (b. 1657)
- March 13 – William Sewel, Dutch historian (b. 1653)

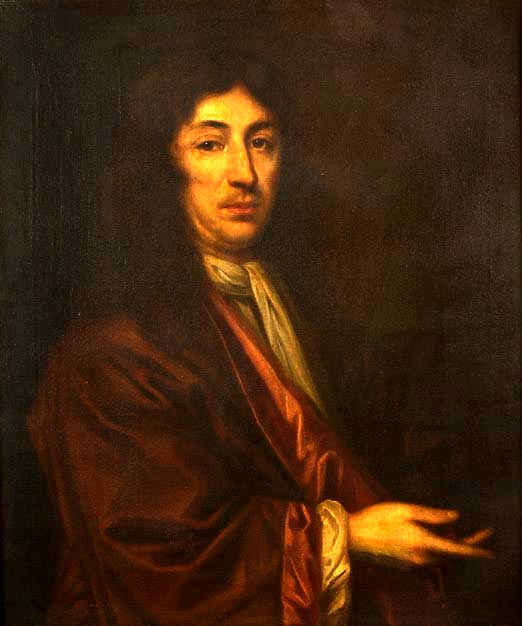
Joseph Dudley

- April 2 – Joseph Dudley, colonial Governor of Massachusetts (b. 1647)
- April 12 – Balaji Vishwanath, Peshwa of the Maratha Empire (b. 1662)
- April 20 – George Gordon, 1st Earl of Aberdeen, Lord Chancellor of Scotland (b. 1637)
- April 21 – Antoine Hamilton, French writer (b. 1646)
- June 19 – Robert Knox, English sea captain (b. 1641)
- June 27 – Guillaume Amfrye de Chaulieu, French poet (b. 1639)
- July 6 – Isaac Milles, English minister (b. 1638)
- July 7 – Juan Romero de Figueroa, Spanish priest (b. 1646)
- July 12 – King Sukjong of Joseon (b. 1661)
- August 3
  - Anthonie Heinsius, Dutch politician (b. 1641)
  - Anne Finch, Countess of Winchilsea, English poet (b. 1661)
- August 9 – Simon Ockley, English orientalist (b. 1678)
- August 17 – Anne Lefèvre, French scholar (b. 1654)
- August 21 – John Leake, English Royal Navy admiral (b. 1656)
- August 23 – Sybilla Masters, American inventor (b. c. 1676)
- August 26 – Johann Christoph Volkamer, German botanist (b. 1644)
- September 3 – Henri de Massue, Marquis de Ruvigny, 1st Viscount Galway, French soldier and diplomat (b. 1648)
- September 9 – Philippe de Courcillon, French officer and author (b. 1638)
- September 20 – Pierre de La Broue, American bishop (b. 1644)
- October 10 – Antoine Coysevox, French sculptor (b. 1640)
- November 12 – Peder Tordenskjold, Norwegian naval hero (b. 1690)

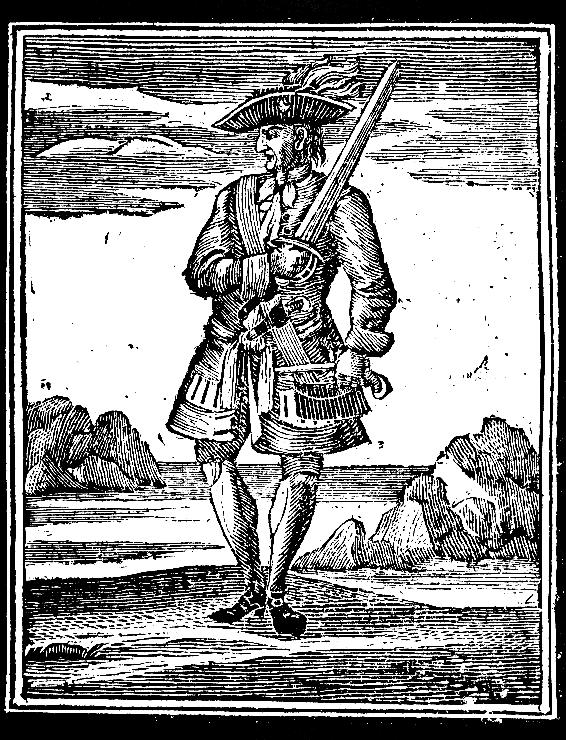
John Rackham

- November 18 – John Rackham, English pirate.
- November 27
  - Willem van Outhoorn, Dutch colonial governor (b. 1635)
  - Diego de Salinas, Governor of Gibraltar (b. 1649)
- December 29 – Maria Margarethe Kirch, German astronomer (b. 1670)
- date unknown
  - Shahzada Assadullah Khan Abdali, Persian Governor of Herat (b. 1687)
  - Demoiselle Conradi, German opera singer

1721

- January 25 – Robert Challe, French colonialist (b. 1659)
- January 26 – Pierre Daniel Huet, French churchman and scholar (b. 1630)
- February 5 – Abraham Hill, British merchant (b. 1633)
- February 5 –James Stanhope, 1st Earl Stanhope, English chief minister (b. 1673)
- February 16 – James Craggs the Younger, English politician (b. 1686)
- February 24 – John Sheffield, 1st Duke of Buckingham and Normanby, English statesman and poet (b. 1648)
- March 16 – James Craggs the Elder, English politician (b. 1657)
- March 19 – Pope Clement XI (b. 1649)
- March 29 – Charles Vane, English pirate, executed (b. 1680)
- April – Mary Read, English-born pirate
- April 14 – Michel Chamillart, French statesman (b. 1652)
- April 27 – Eva von Buttlar, German mystic sectarian (b. 1670)
- May 7 – Zinat-un-Nissa, princess of the Mughal Empire (b. 1643)
- May 8 – Marc-René de Voyer de Paulmy d'Argenson (1652–1721), French politician (b. 1652)
- May 10 – Christian William I, Prince of Schwarzburg-Sondershausen (1666–1720) (b. 1647)
- June 3 – Joaquín Canaves, Spanish Catholic bishop (b. 1640)
- June 18 – Philip, Landgrave of Hesse-Philippsthal, son of William VI (b. 1655)
- July 8 – Elihu Yale, American benefactor of Yale University (b. 1649)
- July 18 – Jean-Antoine Watteau, French painter (b. 1684)
- July 19 – Sir Jonathan Trelawny, 3rd Baronet, British bishop (b. 1650)
- July 26 – Godefroy Maurice de La Tour d'Auvergne, Duke of Bouillon, French noble (b. 1636)
- August 3 – Grinling Gibbons, Dutch-born woodcarver (b. 1648)
- August 13 – Jacques Lelong, French bibliographer (b. 1665)
- September 3 – Sir William Glynne, 2nd Baronet, English politician (b. 1663)
- September 6 – Georg Wolfgang Wedel, German physician, surgeon, botanist, chemist and philosopher (b. 1645)
- September 8
  - Michael Brokoff, Czech sculptor (b. 1686)
  - Henri Arnaud, French Waldensian pastor, leader (b. 1641)
- September 9 – David Martin, French theologian (b. 1639)
- September 11 – Rudolf Jakob Camerarius, German botanist and physician (b. 1665)

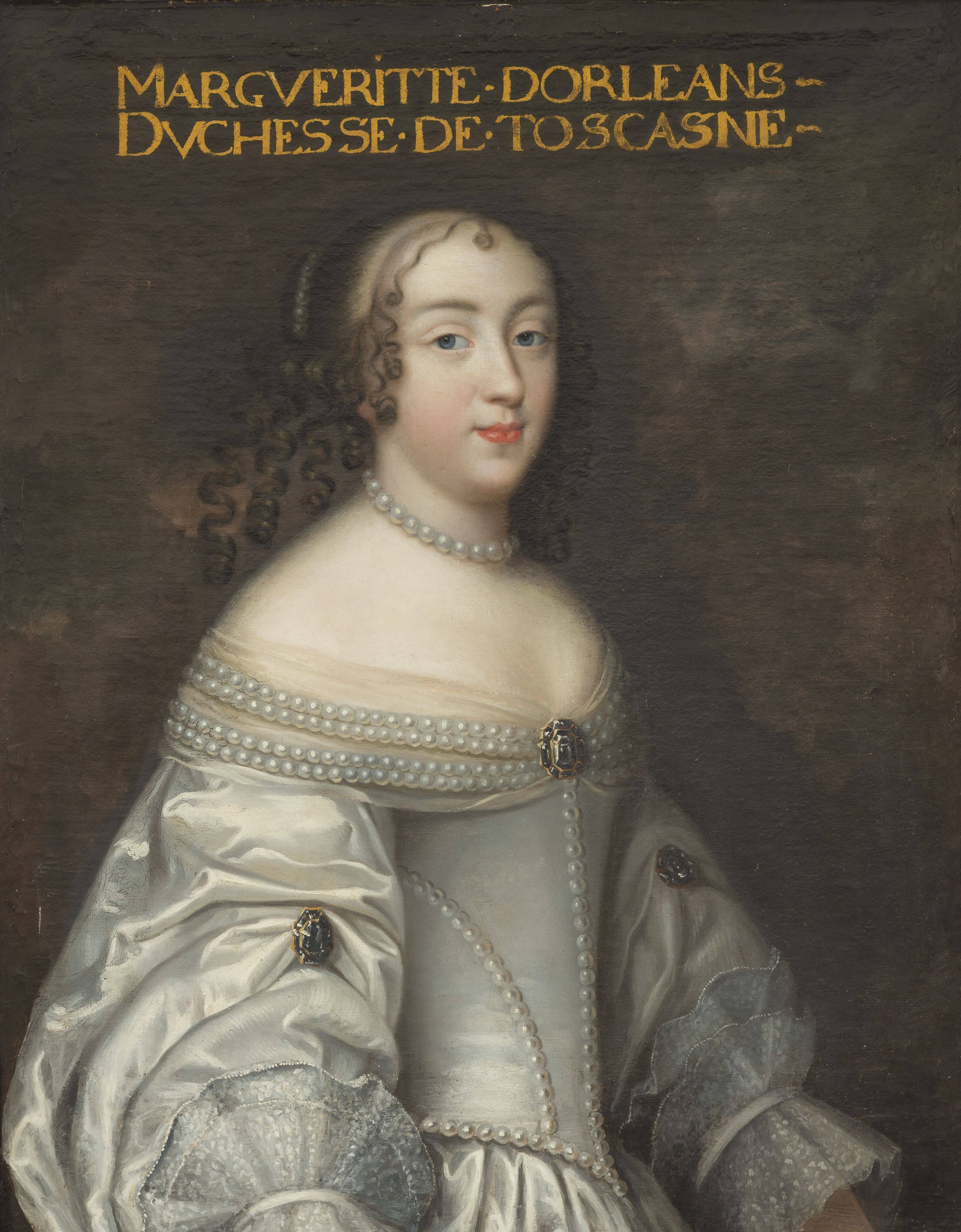
Marguerite Louise d'Orléans

- September 17 – Marguerite Louise d'Orléans, French princess (b. 1645)
- September 18 – Matthew Prior, British poet and diplomat (b. 1664)
- September 20 – Thomas Doggett, Irish actor (b. c. 1670)
- September 24 – Pacificus of San Severino, Italian saint (b. 1653)
- October 4 – Abraham Alewijn, Dutch playwright (b. 1664)
- October 11
  - Edward Colston, English merchant, philanthropist (b. 1636)
  - Anton Florian, Prince of Liechtenstein (b. 1656)
- October 23 – Samuel Frisching, Bernese soldier and politician (b. 1638)
- October 24 – Anthony Morris (I), American politician (b. 1654)
- December 13 – Alexander Selkirk, Scottish-born sailor (original "Robinson Crusoe"), of yellow fever (b. 1676)

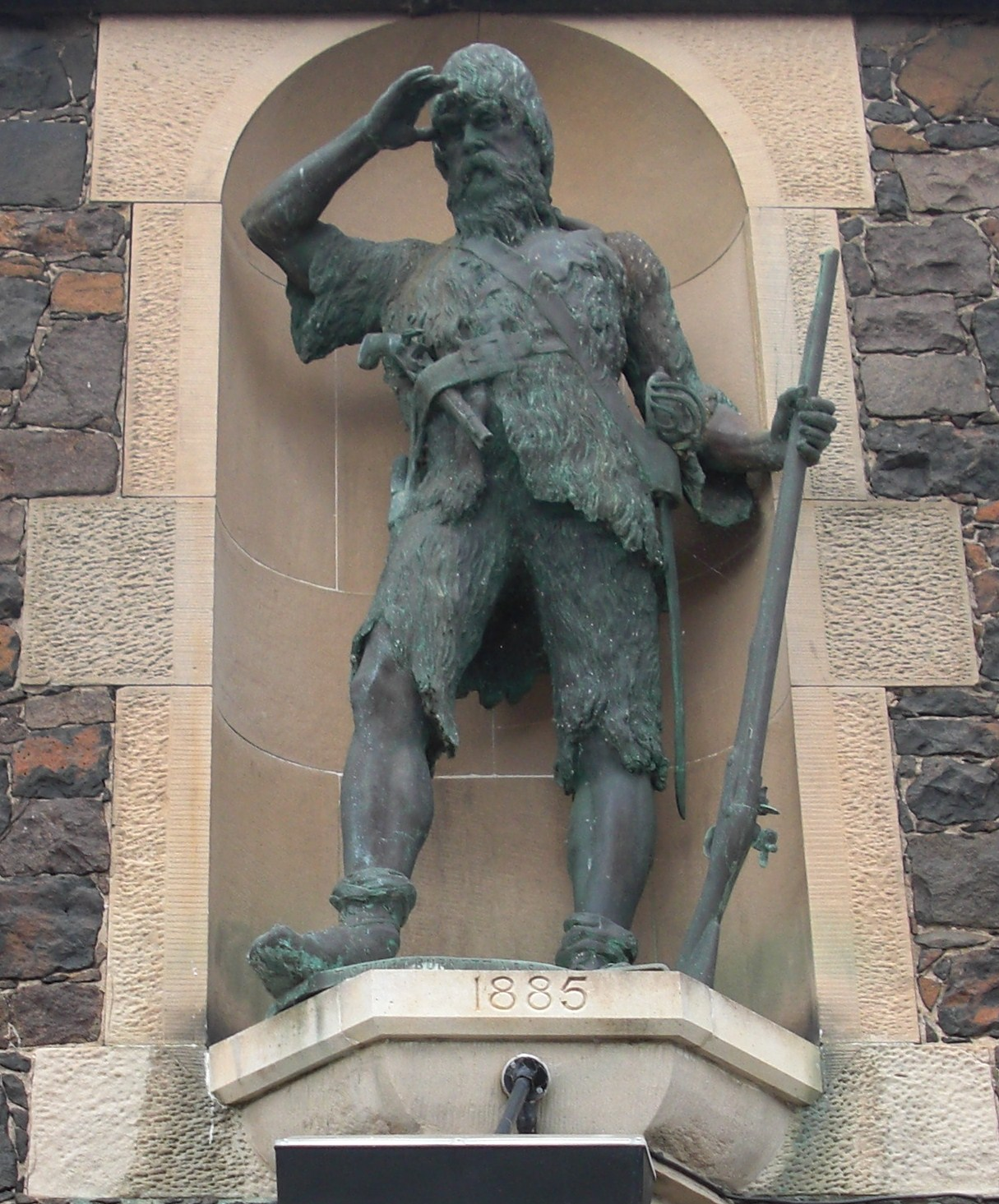
Alexander Selkirk

- December 17 – Richard Lumley, 1st Earl of Scarbrough, English statesman (b. 1650)
- December 25 – António Luís de Sousa, 2nd Marquis of Minas, Portuguese general, governor-general of Brazil (b. 1644)
- date unknown – Sultan Abdullah Khan Abdali, Persian Governor, Shah of Herat (b. 1670)

1722

- January 7 – Antoine Coypel, French painter (b. 1661)
- January 21 – Charles Paulet, 2nd Duke of Bolton, English supporter of William III of England (b. 1661)
- January 23 – Henri de Boulainvilliers, French nobleman (b. 1658)
- January 29 – Carl Gustav Rehnskiöld, Swedish military leader (b. 1651)
- February 5 – Éléonore Desmier d'Olbreuse, Duchess of Braunschweig-Lüneburg (b. 1639)
- February 10 – Bartholomew Roberts, Welsh pirate (b. 1682)
- March 11 – John Toland, Irish philosopher (b. 1670)
- March 31 – Eberhard von Danckelmann, Prime Minister of Brandenburg-Prussia (b. 1643)
- April 13 – Charles Leslie, Irish Anglican theologian (b. 1650)
- April 21 – Robert Beverley, Jr., historian of Colonial Virginia (b. 1673)
- May 20 – Sébastien Vaillant, French botanist (b. 1669)
- June 5 – Johann Kuhnau, German composer (b. 1660)

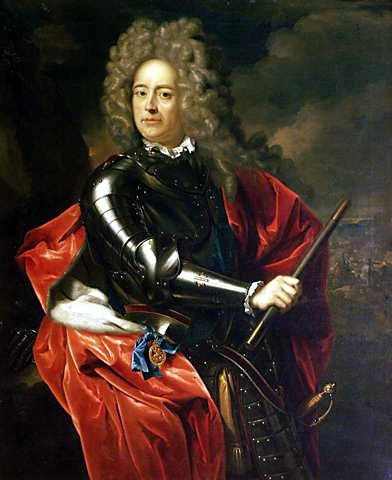
John Churchill, 1st Duke of Marlborough

- June 16
  - John Churchill, 1st Duke of Marlborough, English general (b. 1650)
  - Marc'Antonio Zondadari, Italian-born 65th Grandmaster of the Knights Hospitaller (b. 1658)
- July 16 – Maria Angela Caterina d'Este, Italian princess (b. 1656)
- August 20 – John Coney (silversmith), early American silversmith/goldsmith (b. 1655)
- September 18 – André Dacier, French classical scholar (b. 1651)
- September 20 – John Lauder, Lord Fountainhall, Scottish jurist (b. 1646)
- October 8 – Gerard Callenburgh, Dutch admiral (b. 1642)
- November 12 – Adriaen van der Werff, Dutch painter (b. 1659)
- November 20 – Johann Adam Reincken, German organist (b. 1643)
- December 5 – Marie Anne de La Trémoille, princesse des Ursins, politically active Spanish court official (b. 1642)
- December 8 – Elizabeth Charlotte, Princess Palatine, wife to Philippe I, Duke of Orléans (b. 1652)

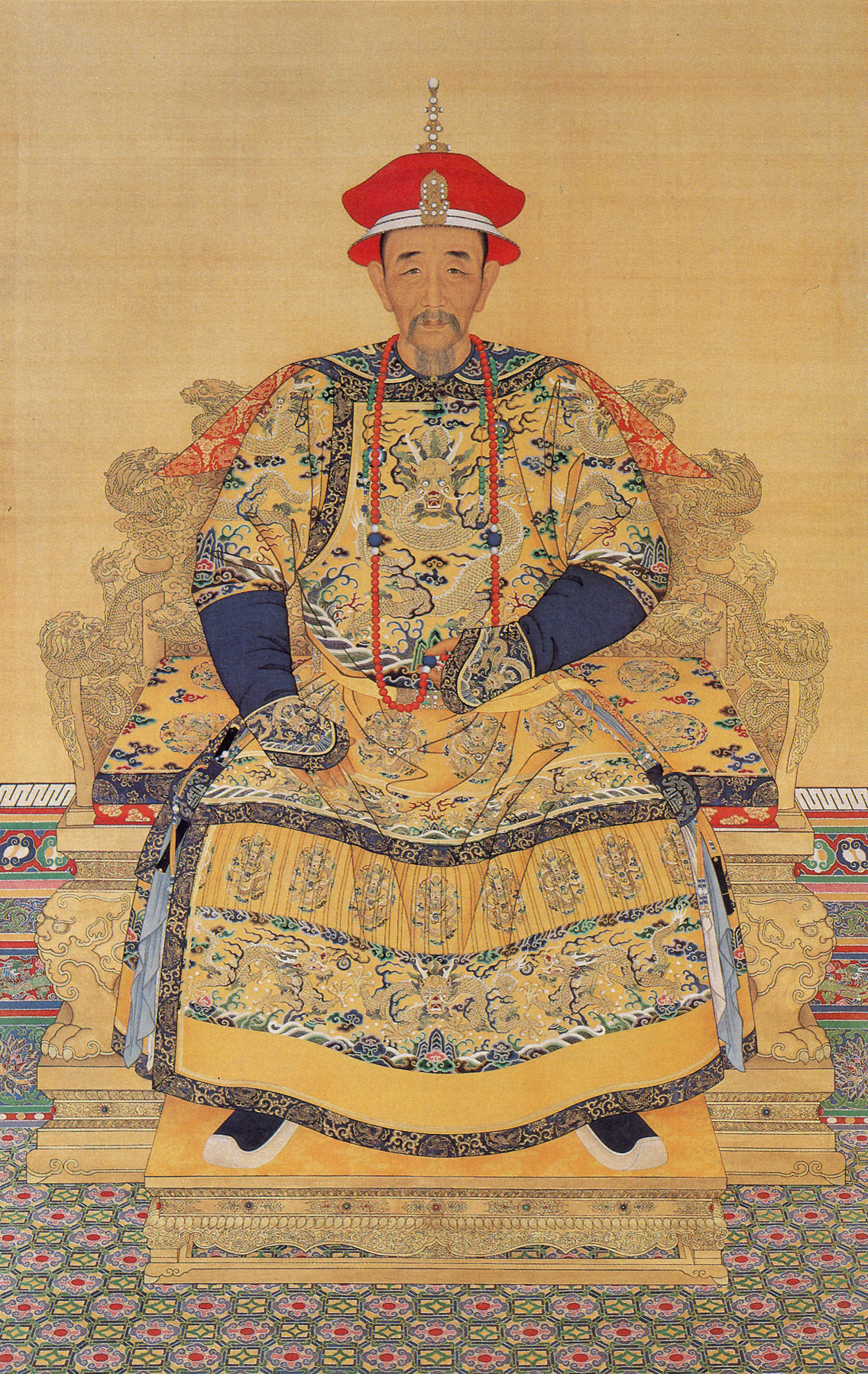
Kangxi Emperor

- December 20 – Kangxi Emperor of China (b. 1654)
- December 23 – Pierre Varignon, French mathematician (b. 1654)

1723

- January 14 – Charles Henri, Prince of Commercy (b. 1649)
- January 23 – William Phippard, English politician (b. 1649)
- February 23 – Anne Henriette of Bavaria, Duchess of Guise (b. 1648)

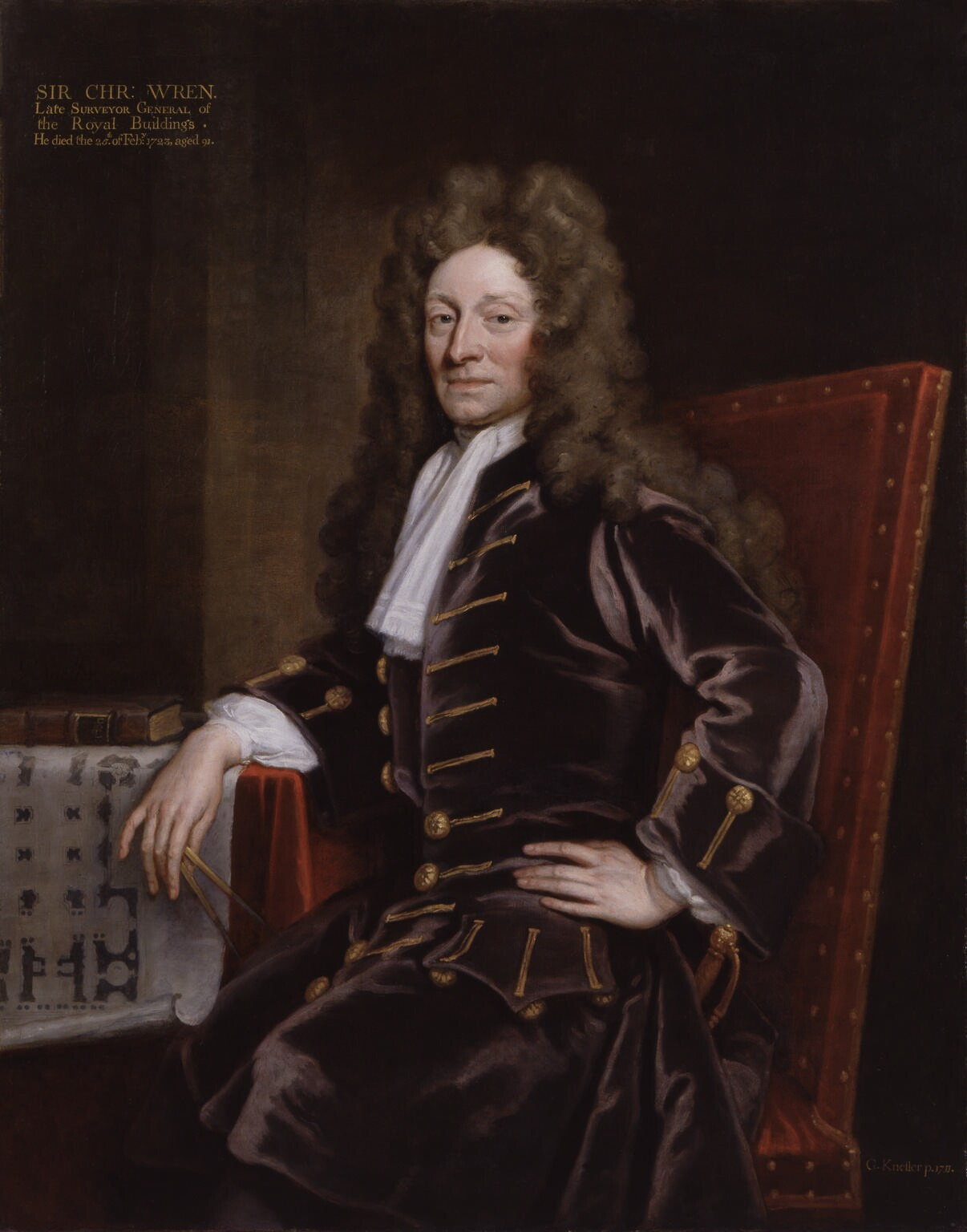
Christopher Wren

- February 25 – Sir Christopher Wren, English architect, astronomer and mathematician (b. 1632)
- February 26 – Thomas d'Urfey, English writer (b. 1653)
- March 13 – René Auguste Constantin de Renneville, French writer (b. 1650)
- March 15 – Johann Christian Günther, German poet (b. 1695)
- March 30 – Filippo Bonanni, Italian Jesuit scholar (b. 1638)
- March 31 – Edward Hyde, 3rd Earl of Clarendon, British Governor of New York and New Jersey (b. 1661)
- April 5 – Johann Bernhard Fischer von Erlach, Austrian architect (b. 1656)
- April 11 – John Robinson, English diplomat (b. 1650)
- May 2 – Christopher of Baden-Durlach, German prince (b. 1684)
- May 11 – Jean Galbert de Campistron, French dramatist (b. 1656)
- May 12 – Johannes Voorhout, Dutch painter (b. 1647)
- May 29 – Jean de La Chapelle, French writer and dramatist (b. 1651)
- June 4 – Léopold Clément, Hereditary Prince of Lorraine, French prince (b. 1707)
- June 8 – Isaac Chayyim Cantarini, Italian rabbi (b. 1644)
- June 14 – Richard Newport, 2nd Earl of Bradford, English politician (b. 1644)
- July 14 – Claude Fleury, French historian (b. 1640)
- July 26 – Robert Bertie, 1st Duke of Ancaster and Kesteven, English statesman (b. 1660)
- July 28 – Mariana Alcoforado, Portuguese nun (b. 1640)
- August 4 – William Fleetwood, Anglican bishop (b. 1656)
- August 10 – Guillaume Dubois, French cardinal, statesman (b. 1656)
- August 14 – Edward Northey (barrister), British barrister and politician (b. 1652)
- August 17 – Joseph Bingham, English scholar (b. 1668)
- August 21 – Dimitrie Cantemir, Moldavian linguist and scholar (b. 1673)
- August 23 – Increase Mather, American Puritan minister (b. 1639)

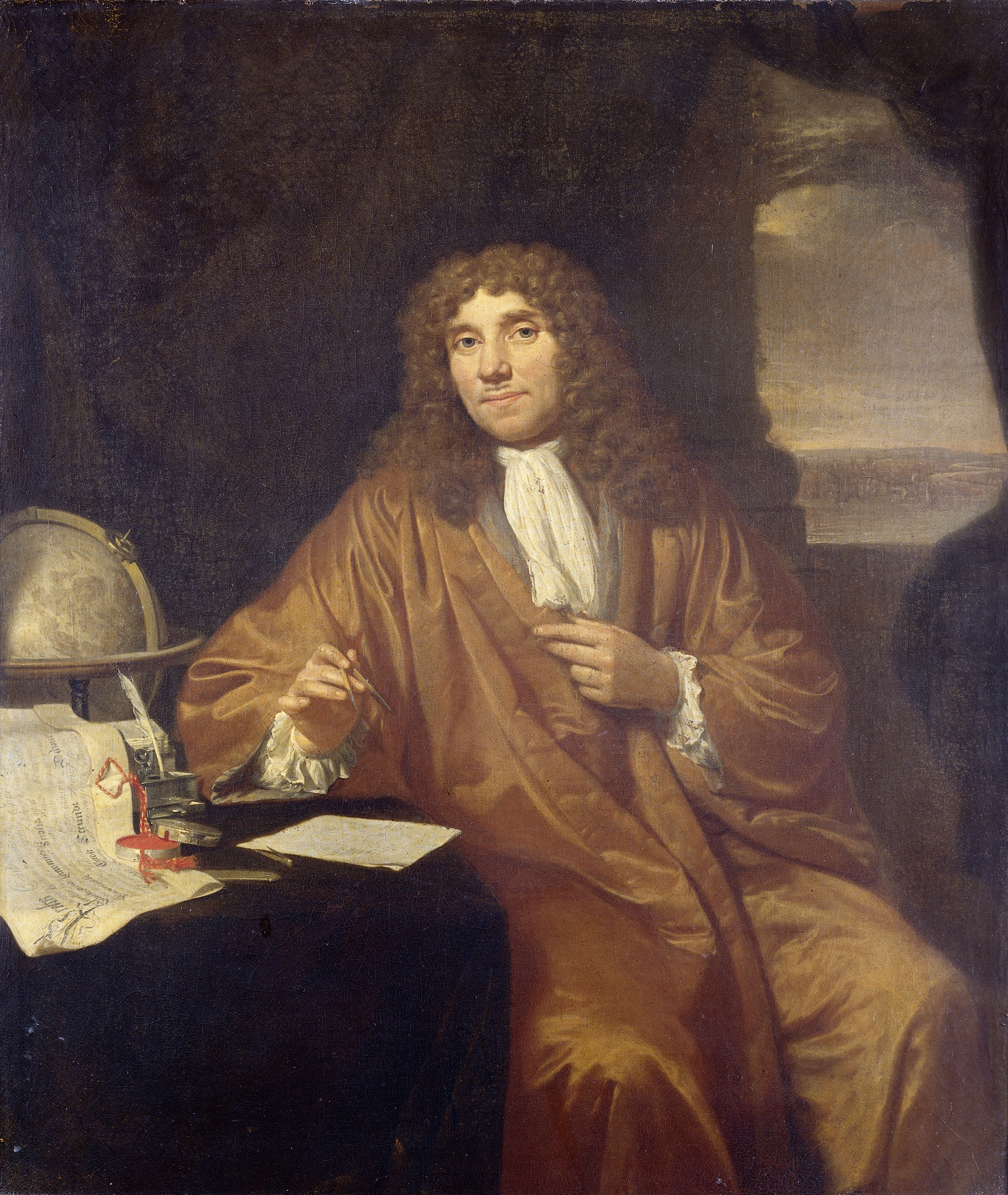
Antonie van Leeuwenhoek

- August 26 – Antonie van Leeuwenhoek, Dutch scientist (b. 1632)
- September 19 – Robert Sutton, 2nd Baron Lexinton, English diplomat (b. 1662)
- October 1 – Frédéric Maurice Casimir de La Tour d'Auvergne, French prince (b. 1702)
- October 10 – William Cowper, 1st Earl Cowper, Lord Chancellor of England (b. c. 1665)
- October 13 – Praskovia Saltykova, Russian tsarina (b. 1664)
- October 19 – Godfrey Kneller, German-born artist (b. 1646)
- October 28 – Christopher Vane, 1st Baron Barnard, English politician and peer (b. 1653)
- October 31 – Cosimo III de' Medici, Grand Duke of Tuscany (b. 1642)
- November 19 – Antoine Nompar de Caumont, French courtier and statesman (b. 1632)
- December 1 – Susanna Centlivre, English dramatist, actress (b. 1669)
- December 2 – Philippe II, Duke of Orléans, regent of France (b. 1674)
- December 7 – Jan Santini Aichel, Czech architect (b. 1677)
- December 20 – Augustus Quirinus Rivinus, German physician, botanist (b. 1652)

1724

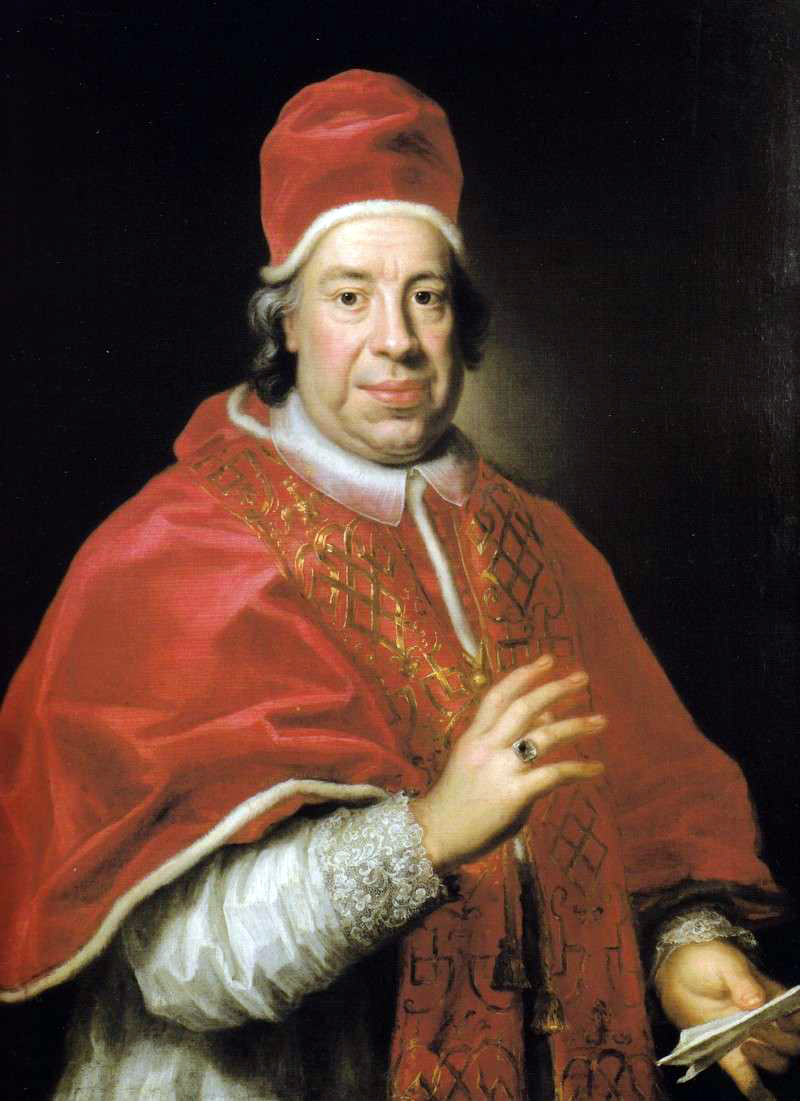
Pope Innocent XIII

Saint Ludovico Sabbatini

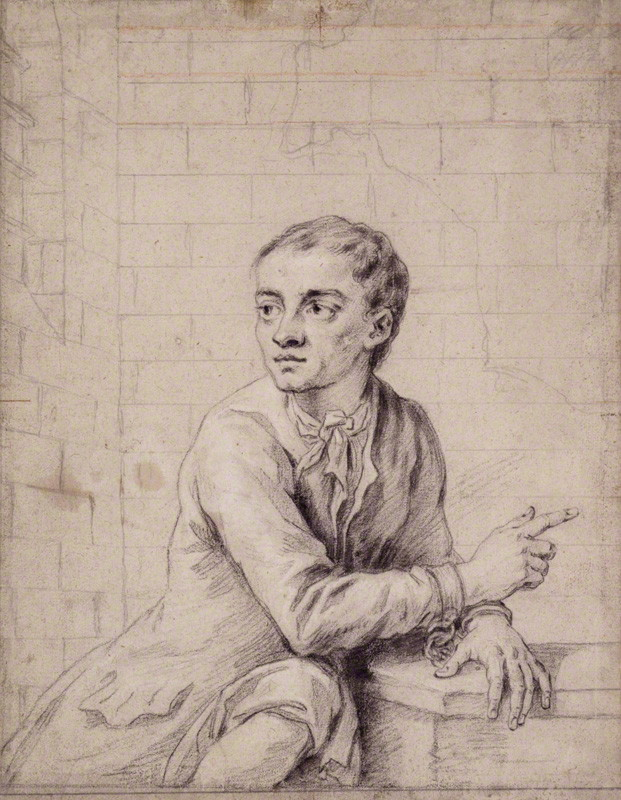
Jack Sheppard

- January 20 – William Lowndes, English politician (b. 1652)
- February 19 – Pieter Schuyler, British colonial military leader, acting governor of New York (b. 1657)
- March 4 – Princess Eleonore Juliane of Brandenburg-Ansbach, duchess by marriage of Württemberg-Winnental (b. 1663)
- March 7 – Pope Innocent XIII (b. 1655)
- March 10 – Urban Hjärne, Swedish chemist (b. 1641)
- March 15 – Regent Marie Jeanne Baptiste of Savoy-Nemours (b. 1644)
- March 19 – Lewis Watson, 1st Earl of Rockingham, English politician (b. 1655)
- March 31 – Sophia of Saxe-Weissenfels, Princess of Anhalt-Zerbst (b. 1654)
- April 28 – Streynsham Master, English colonial administrator (b. 1640)
- May 3 – John Leverett the Younger, American President of Harvard (b. 1662)
- May 21 – Robert Harley, 1st Earl of Oxford and Earl Mortimer, English statesman (b. 1661)
- June – Magdelaine Chapelain, French fortune teller and poisoner (b. 1651)
- June 11 – Ludovico Sabbatini, Italian Roman Catholic priest and saint (b. 1650)
- June 15 – Henry Sacheverell, English churchman and politician (b. 1674)
- June 24 – Johann Theile, German composer and organist (b. 1646)
- July 1 – Johann Homann, German cartographer (b. 1664)
- July 2 – Thomas Maule, prominent Quaker in colonial Salem (b. 1645)
- July 13 – Sir Richard Levinge, 1st Baronet, British politician (b. 1656)
- July 31 – Claude de Ramezay, Canadian politician (b. 1659)
- August 2 – Patrick Hume, 1st Earl of Marchmont, Scottish statesman (b. 1641)
- August 6 – Samson Wertheimer, European rabbi (b. 1658)
- August 21 – Noël Alexandre, French theologian and ecclesiastical historian (b. 1639)
- August 24 – Andreas Kneller, German organist and composer (b. 1649)
- August 31 – King Louis I of Spain (b. 1707)
- October 2 – François-Timoléon de Choisy, French writer (b. 1644)
- October 18 – Jean de Hautefeuille, French cleric, scientist (b. 1647)
- October 29 – William Wollaston, English philosophical writer (b. 1659)
- October 30 – Marie of Lorraine, French princess (b. 1674)
- November 7 – John Kyrle, British philanthropist (b. 1637)
- November 14 – John Murray, 1st Duke of Atholl (b. 1660)
- November 16 – Jack Sheppard, British criminal (executed) (b. 1702)
- November 18 – Bartolomeu de Gusmão, Portuguese naturalist (b. 1685)
- November 24 – Ernst Ludwig I, Duke of Saxe-Meiningen (b. 1672)
- November 28 – Robert Marsham, 1st Baron Romney, British politician (b. 1685)
- December 27 – Thomas Guy, English philanthropist (b. 1644)

1725

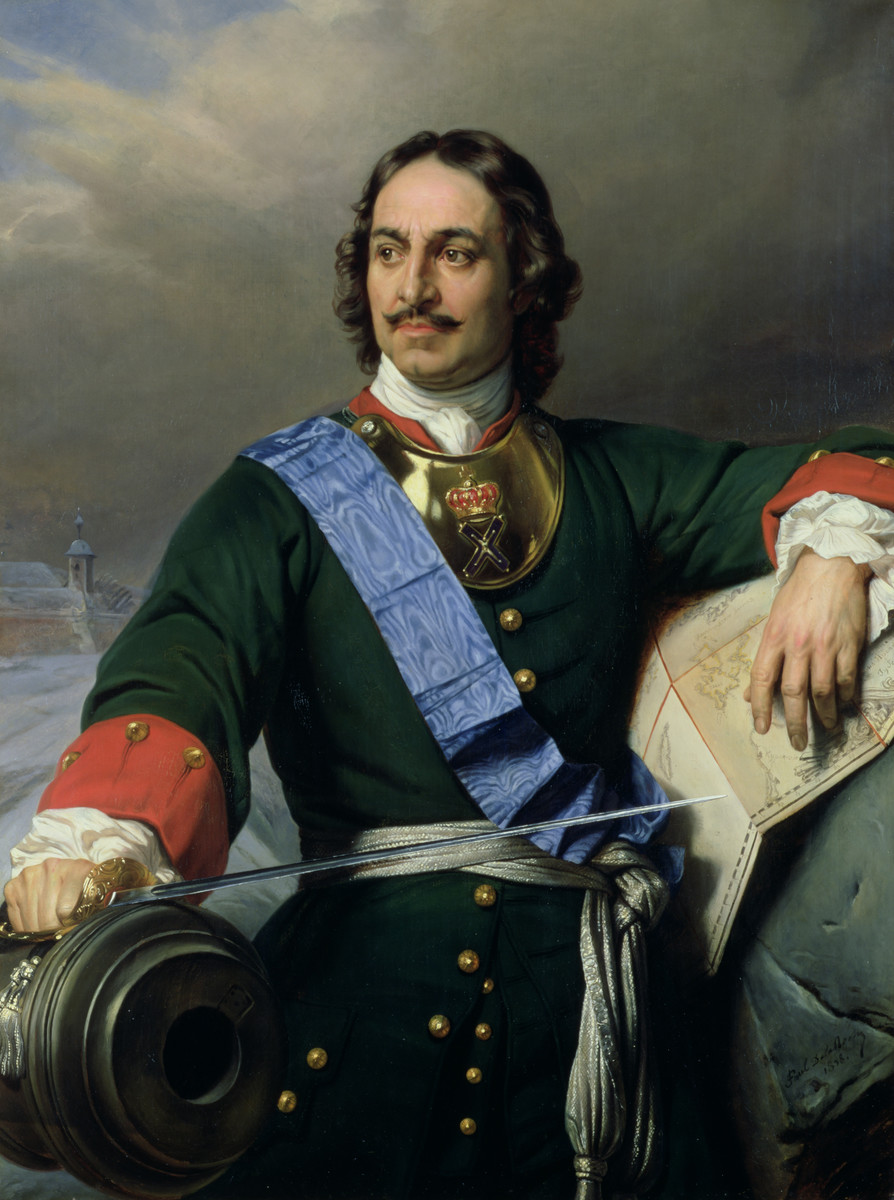
Emperor Peter I of Russia

Jonathan Wild

- January 6 – Chikamatsu Monzaemon, Japanese dramatist (b. 1653)
- January 26 – Sulkhan-Saba Orbeliani, Georgian prince (b. 1658)
- January 29 – Nuno Álvares Pereira de Melo, 1st Duke of Cadaval, Portuguese nobleman and statesman (b. 1638)
- February 7 – Johann Philipp Krieger, German Baroque composer (b. 1649)
- February 8 – Emperor Peter I of Russia (b. 1672)
- March 2 – José Benito de Churriguera, Spanish architect, sculptor (b. 1665)
- March 10 – John Conyers, English politician (b. 1650)
- March 30 – René de Froulay de Tessé, French Marshal and diplomat (b. 1648)
- April 8 – John Wise, English clergyman (b. 1652)
- April 12 – Giovanni Battista Foggini, Italian artist (b. 1652)
- April 25 – Paul de Rapin, French historian (b. 1661)
- May 22 – Robert Molesworth, 1st Viscount Molesworth, Irish politician (b. 1656)
- May 24 – Jonathan Wild, English criminal (b. 1682)
- May 31 – Erik Carlsson Sjöblad, Swedish governor, admiral, and baron (b. 1647)
- June 29
  - Arai Hakuseki, Japanese poet, politician, and writer (b. 1657)
  - Juan Manuel Fernández Pacheco, 8th Duke of Escalona, Spanish aristocrat (b. 1650)
- July 11 – Salomon Franck, German lawyer, scientist, poet (b. 1659)
- July 17 – Thomas King, English and British soldier, MP for Queenborough, lieutenant-governor of Sheerness (b. before 1660?)
- September 16 – Antoine V de Gramont, French military leader (b. 1672)
- October 10
  - Francesco del Giudice, Italian Catholic cardinal (b. 1647)
  - Philippe de Rigaud Vaudreuil, Governor-General of New France (b. c. 1643)
- October 11 – Hans Herr, Swiss-born Mennonite bishop (b. 1639)
- October 16 – Ralph Thoresby, British historian (b. 1658)
- October 24 – Alessandro Scarlatti, Italian composer (b. 1660)
- November 20 – William, Landgrave of Hesse-Rotenburg (from 1683) (b. 1648)
- December 7 – Florent Carton Dancourt, French dramatist, actor (b. 1661)
- December 10 – Nicolaas Hartsoeker, Dutch mathematician and physicist (b. 1656)
- date unknown
  - Giuseppe Mazzuoli, Italian sculptor (b. 1644)
  - José Mora, Spanish sculptor (b. 1638)
  - Nguyễn Phúc Chu, Vietnamese ruler (b. 1675)
  - Petar Blagojević, Serbian peasant, alleged vampire
  - Alicia D'Anvers, English poet (b. 1688)
- probable
  - Leendert Hasenbosch, Dutch castaway on Ascension Island (b. c. 1695)
  - Keaweʻīkekahialiʻiokamoku, ruler of Hawaii (b. c. 1660)

1726

- January 2 – Domenico Zipoli, Tuscan-born composer and Jesuit missionary (b. 1688)
- January 12 – Hercule-Louis Turinetti, marquis of Prié (b. 1658)
- January 19
  - Franz Beer, Austrian architect (b. 1659)
  - Giovanni Battista Tolomei, Italian Jesuit priest, theologian and cardinal (b. 1653)
- January 25 – Guillaume Delisle, French cartographer (b. 1675)
- February 18 – Jacques Carrey, French painter (b. 1649)
- February 26 – Maximilian II Emanuel, Elector of Bavaria (b. 1662)
- March 5 – Evelyn Pierrepont, 1st Duke of Kingston-upon-Hull, English politician (b. c. 1665)
- March 6 – Henrietta Catharina, Baroness von Gersdorff, German noblewoman; poet (b. 1648)
- March 13 – Alexander Pendarves, British politician (b. 1662)

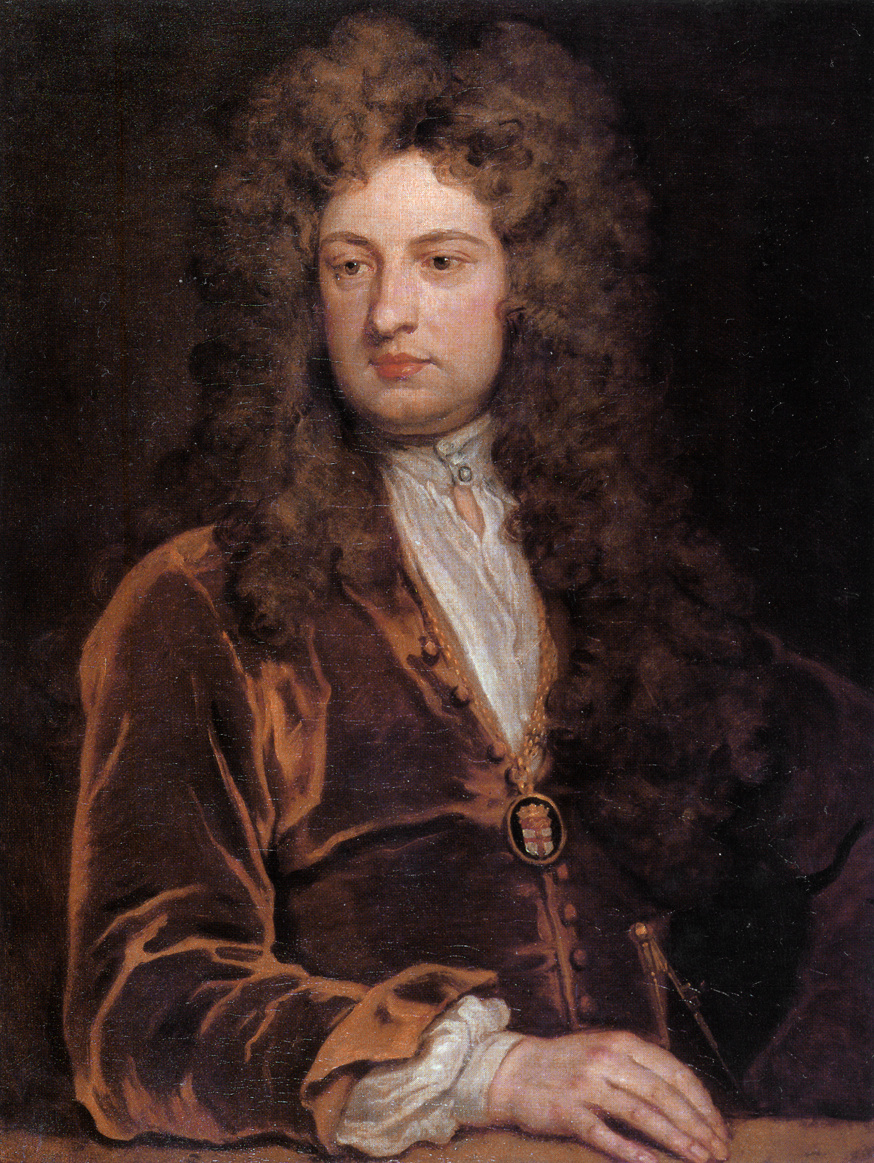
John Vanbrugh

- March 14 – Chhatrapati Shivaji Raje Bhonsale 2nd, 5th Maratha Emperor (b. 1696)
- March 26 – John Vanbrugh, English architect and dramatist (b. 1664)
- April 26 – Jeremy Collier, English theatre critic, non-juror bishop and theologian (b. 1650)
- April 28 – Thomas Pitt, British Governor of Madras (b. 1653)
- May 10 – Charles Beauclerk, 1st Duke of St Albans, English soldier (b. 1670)
- June 18 – Michel Richard Delalande, French organist, composer (b. 1657)
- July 3 – Galeazzo Marescotti, Italian Catholic cardinal (b. 1627)
- July 8 – John Ker, Scottish spy (b. 1673)
- July 22 – Hugh Drysdale, British Colonial Governor of Virginia
- July 31 – Nicolaus II Bernoulli, Swiss mathematician (b. 1695)
- September 22 – Aixinjueluo Yuntang, born Aixinjueluo Yintang, Qing prince (b. 1683)
- October 29 – Jean Boivin the Younger, French writer (b. 1663)
- November 22 – Anton Domenico Gabbiani, Italian painter (b. 1652)
- November 23 – Sophia Dorothea of Celle, queen consort of George I of Great Britain (b. 1666)
- December 2 – Samuel Penhallow, American colonist, historian (b. 1665)

1727

- January 17 – Johann Christoph Wichmannshausen, German philosopher (b. 1663)
- January 24 – Magdalena Stenbock, Swedish salon hostess (b. 1649)
- February 6 – Charles Boit, Swedish enameller, miniature painter (b. 1662)
- February 10 – Procopio Cutò, French entrepreneur (b. 1651)
- February 13 – William Wotton, English scholar (b. 1666)
- February 22 – Francesco Gasparini, Italian composer (b. 1661)
- February 23 – Lionel Tollemache, 3rd Earl of Dysart, British politician and nobleman (b. 1649)

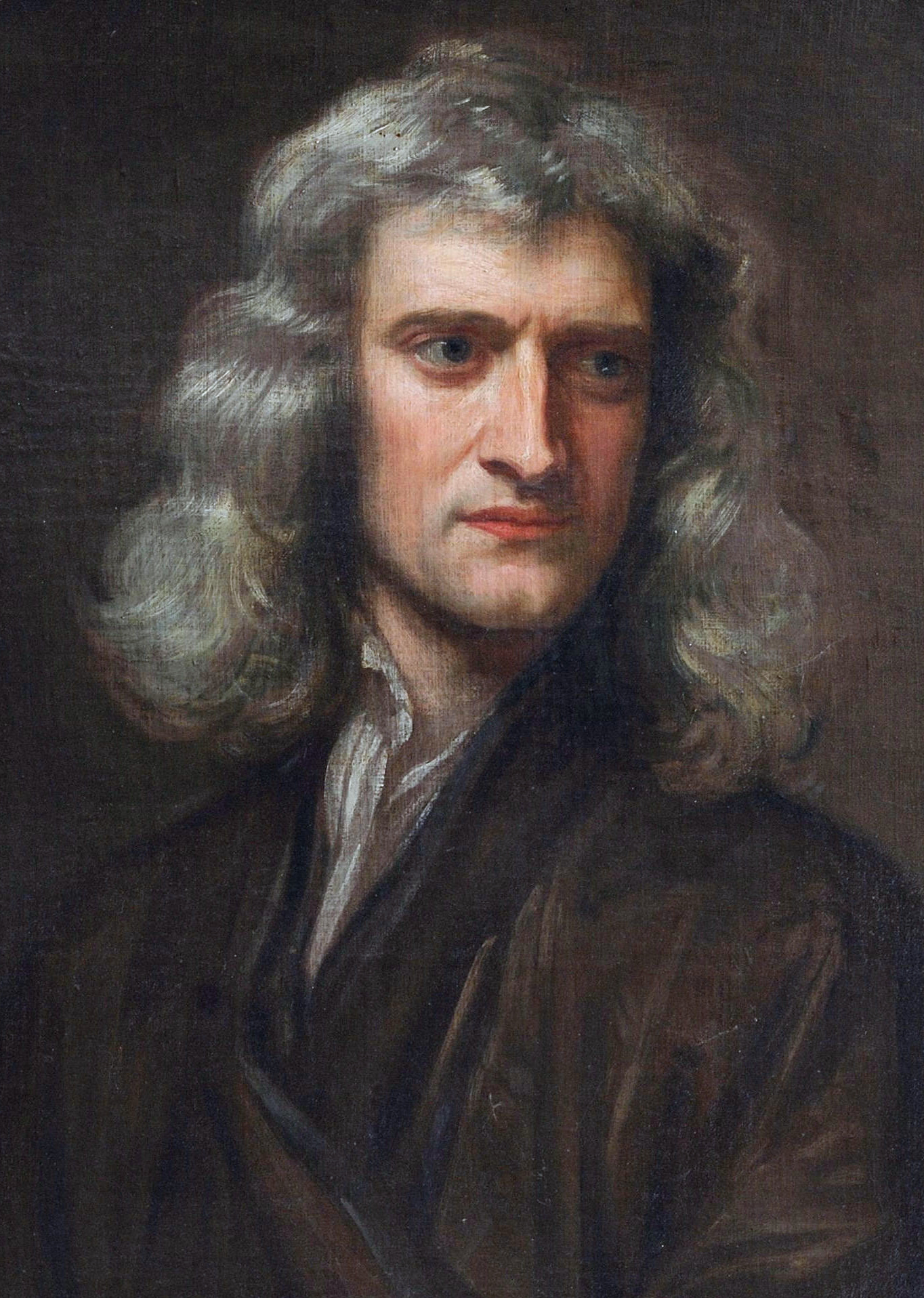
Isaac Newton

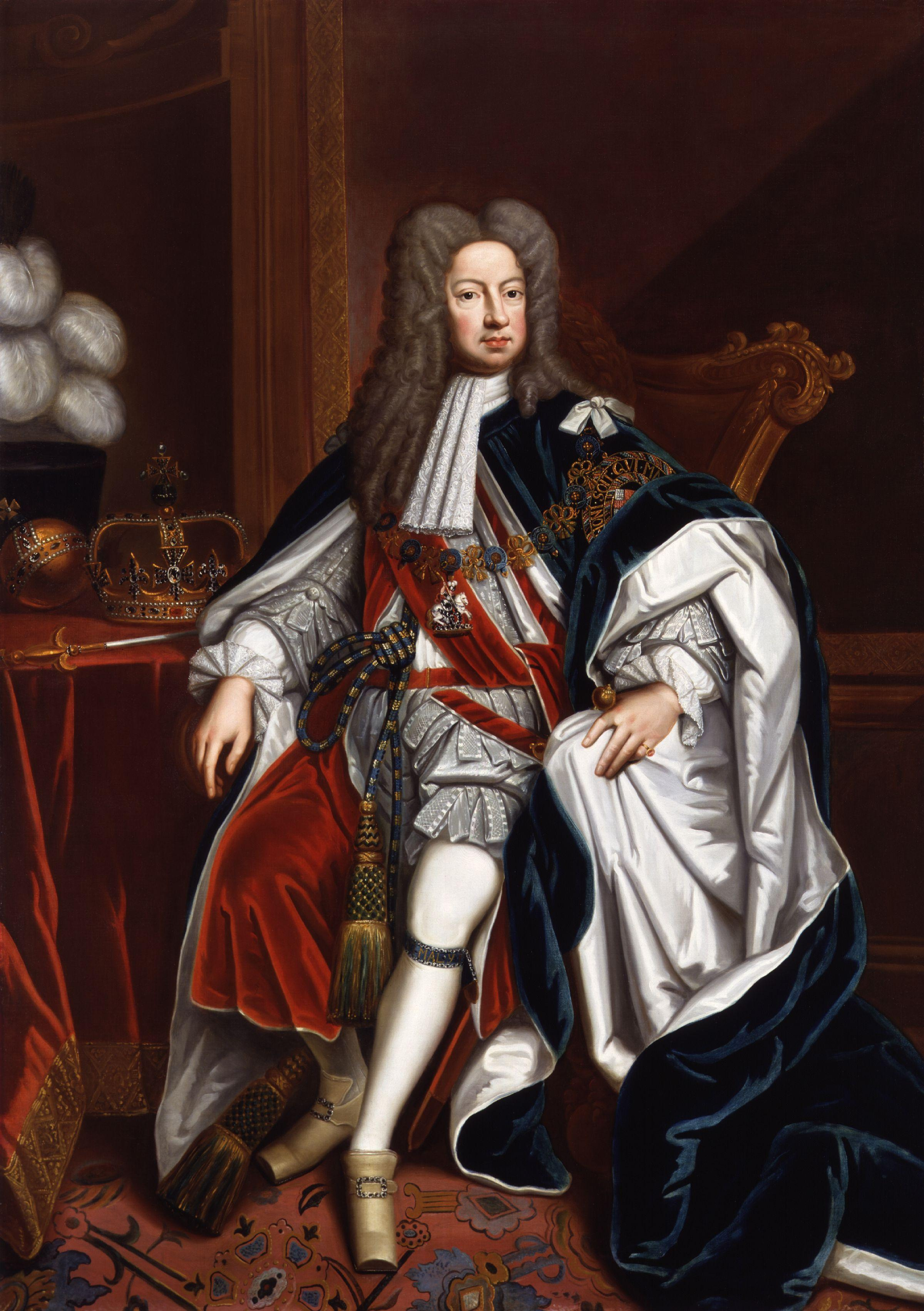
George I of Great Britain

- March 31 [O.S. March 20] – Sir Isaac Newton, English scientist (b. 1643)
- April 15 – George Compton, 4th Earl of Northampton (b. 1664)
- May 17 – Empress Catherine I of Russia (b. 1684)
- June 8 – August Hermann Francke, German Protestant minister (b. 1663)
- June 11
  - Richard Hill of Hawkstone, English statesman (b. 1655)
  - King George I of Great Britain (b. 1660)
- July 9 – Veronica Giuliani, Italian nun, mystic (b. 1660)
- July 23 – Simon Harcourt, 1st Viscount Harcourt, Lord Chancellor of Great Britain (b. c. 1660)
- August 4 – Victor-Maurice, comte de Broglie, French general (b. 1647)
- August 14 – William Croft, English composer (b. 1678)
- August 17 – Louis, Duke of Rohan, French noble (b. 1652)
- August 27 – Aert de Gelder, Dutch painter (b. 1645)
- September 6 – George Hooper, Bishop of St Asaph
  Bishop of Bath and Wells (b. 1640)
- September 7 – Glückel of Hameln, German businesswoman and diarist (b. 1647)
- September 8 – Giuseppe Bartolomeo Chiari, Italian painter (b. 1654)
- September 25
  - Jakob Abbadie, Swiss Protestant preacher (b. c. 1654)
  - Sarah Kemble Knight, colonial Massachusetts diarist (b. 1666)
- October 2 – Johann Conrad Brunner, Swiss anatomist (b. 1653)
- October 10
  - Charles III, Prince of Guéméné, French nobleman (b. 1655)
  - Robert Rochfort, Irish politician (b. 1652)
- November 10 – Alphonse de Tonty, French explorer and American settler (b. 1659)
- December 22 – Louis Phélypeaux, comte de Pontchartrain (b. 1643)
- December 26
  - Jean-Baptiste de La Croix de Chevrières de Saint-Vallier, Catholic bishop of Quebec (b. 1653)
  - Baltasar de Zúñiga, 1st Duke of Arión, viceroy of New Spain (b. 1658)
- date unknown
  - Alessio Erardi, Maltese painter (b. 1669)
  - Pietro Erardi, Maltese chaplain and painter (b. 1644)
  - Jesse of Kartli, King of Georgia (b. 1680 or 1681)
  - Basil Matthew II, Syriac Orthodox Maphrian of the East

1728

- January 26 – Paolo de Matteis, Italian painter (b. 1662)
- February 12 – Agostino Steffani, Italian diplomat, composer (b. 1654)

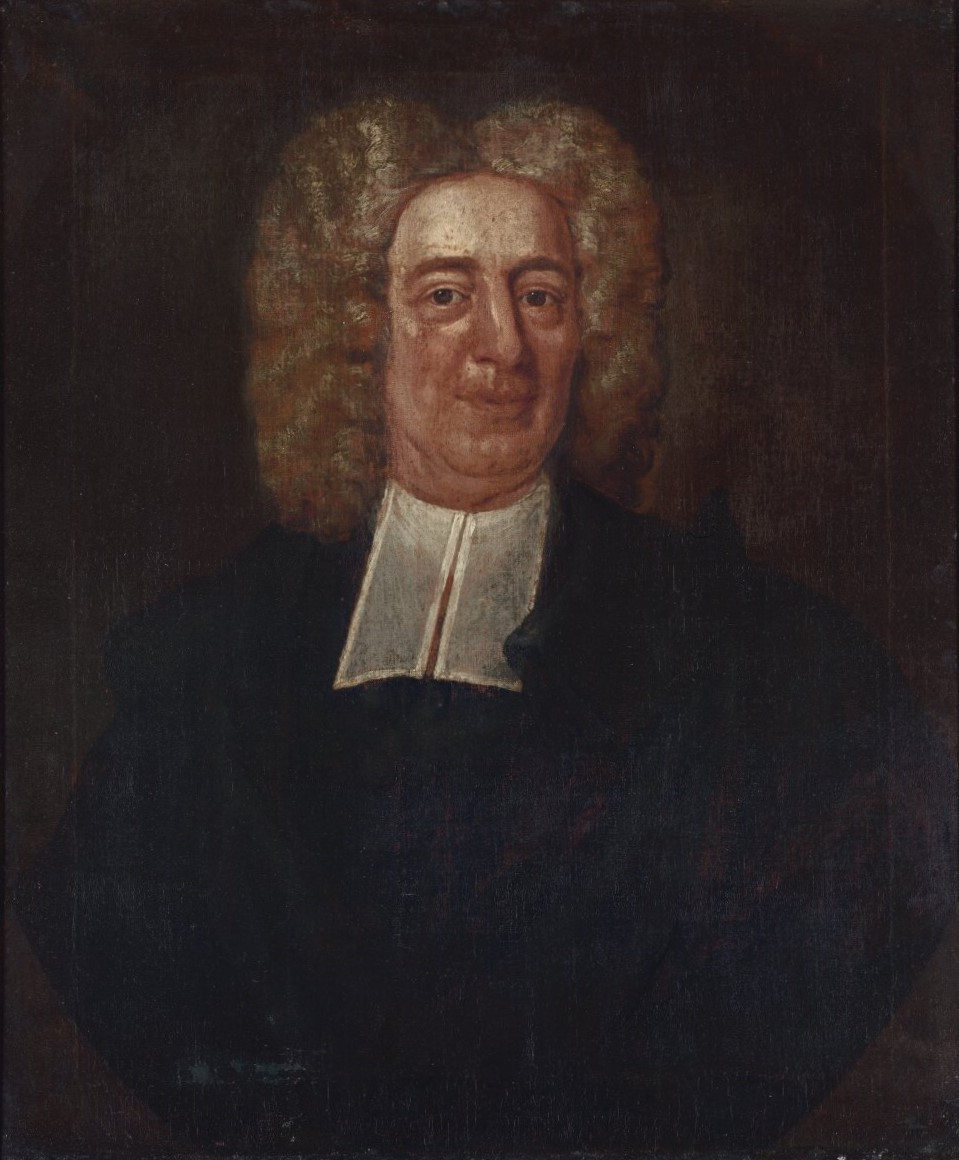
Cotton Mather

- February 13 – Cotton Mather, New England Puritan minister (b. 1663)
- February 16
  - Maria Aurora von Königsmarck, Swedish noblewoman of Brandenburg extraction (b. 1662)
  - Heinrich of Saxe-Weissenfels, Count of Barby, German prince (b. 1657)
- February 25 – Alexander zu Dohna-Schlobitten, German general (b. 1661)
- March 4 – Grand Duchess Anna Petrovna of Russia, eldest daughter of Peter the Great (b. 1708)
- March 7 – Frederick Louis, Duke of Schleswig-Holstein-Sonderburg-Beck (b. 1653)
- March 18 – George Stanhope, Dean of Canterbury (b. 1660)
- March 20 – Camille d'Hostun, duc de Tallard, Marshal of France (b. 1652)
- May 26 – William Cheyne, 2nd Viscount Newhaven, English politician (b. 1657)
- April 3 – James Anderson, Scottish historian (b. 1662)
- April 10 – Nicodemus Tessin the Younger, Swedish architect (b. 1654)
- April 21 – Filippo Antonio Gualterio, Italian Catholic cardinal (b. 1660)
- April 23 – Tomás de Torrejón y Velasco, Spanish composer, musician and organist (b. 1644)
- May 7 – Rose Venerini, Italian saint, educational pioneer (b. 1656)
- May 14 – Louise Marie d'Orléans, Mademoiselle, French princess (b. 1726)
- May 23 – William Delaune, English academic administrator and clergyman (b. 1659)
- June 6 – David Leslie, 3rd Earl of Leven, British politician (b. 1660)
- June 17 – Matthieu Petit-Didier, French Benedictine theologian (b. 1659)
- June 30 – Otto Friedrich von der Groeben, Prussian traveller, soldier and author (b. 1657)
- July 21 – Nathaniel Gould, English politician (b. 1661)
- August 3 – Abraham de Peyster, United States politician (b. 1657)
- August 7 – Jacques L'enfant, French Protestant pastor (b. 1661)
- August 11 – William Sherard, English botanist (b. 1659)
- August 15 – Marin Marais, French viol player and composer (b. 1656)
- August 26
  - William Ernest, Duke of Saxe-Weimar (b. 1662)
  - Anne Marie d'Orléans, Queen consort of Sicily and Sardinia (b. 1669)
- September 23 – Christian Thomasius, German jurist (b. 1655)
- September 24 – Frederik Krag, Danish nobleman and senior civil servant (b. 1655)
- October 1 – Robert Livingston the Elder, New York colonial official (b. 1654)
- October 15 – Bernard de la Monnoye, French lawyer (b. 1641)
- November 10 – Fyodor Apraksin, Russian admiral (b. 1661)
- November 15 – Élie Benoist, French Protestant minister (b. 1640)
- November 19 – Leopold, Prince of Anhalt-Köthen, German prince (b. 1694)
- November 22
  - Grand Duchess Natalya Alexeyevna of Russia (1714–1728), Russian grand duchess (b. 1714)
  - Joseph Boyse, Presbyterian minister (b. 1660)
- December 4 – Richard Ferrier, English politician (born c. 1671)
- December 8 – Camillo Rusconi, Italian artist (b. 1658)
- December 28 – Thomas Johnson, English politician (b. 1664)
- date unknown
  - Giovanni Barbara, Maltese architect and military engineer (b. 1642)
  - Dionysius Andreas Freher, German mystic (b. 1649)
  - Stokkseyrar-Dísa, Icelandic Galdrmistress (b. 1668)
  - Serfoji I, third Raja of the Bhonsle Dynasty (b. 1675)
  - Maria Guyomar de Pinha, Siamese cook (b. 1664)

1729

- January 11 – Thomas of Cori, Italian Friar Minor and preacher (b. 1655)
- January 19
  - William Congreve, English playwright (b. 1670)
  - Lorenzo Cozza, Italian Catholic cardinal (b. 1654)
- January 30 – Lothar Franz von Schönborn, Archbishop of Mainz (b. 1655)
- January 31 – Jacob Roggeveen, Dutch explorer (b. 1659)
- February 11 – Solomon Stoddard, pastor of the Congregationalist Church in Northampton, Massachusetts (b. 1643)
- February 17 – John Ernest IV, Duke of Saxe-Coburg-Saalfeld (b. 1658)
- March 2 – Francesco Bianchini, Italian philosopher, scientist (b. 1662)
- March 6 – Sir William Lowther, 1st Baronet, of Swillington, British politician (b. 1663)
- March 15 – Elisabeth Eleonore of Brunswick-Wolfenbüttel, Duchess consort of Saxe-Meiningen (b. 1658)
- March 18 – Michael Bernhard Valentini, German naturalist (b. 1657)
- March 21
  - John Law, Scottish-born economist (b. 1671)
  - Elżbieta Sieniawska, politically influential Polish magnate (b. 1669)
- March 26 – Simon de la Loubère, French diplomat (b. 1642)
- April 12 – Louis-Guillaume Pécour, French dancer and choreographer (b. 1653)
- May 4 – Louis-Antoine, Cardinal de Noailles, French bishop (b. 1651)

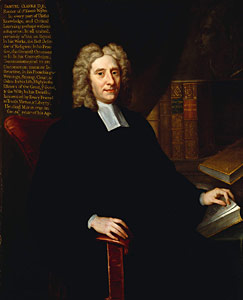
Samuel Clarke

- May 17 – Samuel Clarke, English philosopher (b. 1675)
- June 4 – Sir John Delaval, 3rd Baronet, English politician (b. 1654)
- June 12 – John Williams, American clergy (b. 1664)
- June 27 – Élisabeth Jacquet de La Guerre, French harpsichordist and composer (b. 1665)
- July 16 – Johann David Heinichen, German composer (b. 1683)
- July 30 – Thomas Tufton, 6th Earl of Thanet, British politician (b. 1644)
- August 5 – Thomas Newcomen, English inventor (b. 1663)
- August 31 – John Blackadder, Scottish soldier (b. 1664)
- September 1 – Richard Steele, Irish writer and politician (b. 1672)
- September 3 – Jean Hardouin, French scholar (b. 1646)
- September 7 – William Burnet, British Governor of New York and New Jersey (b. 1688)
- October 9 – Richard Blackmore, English physician and writer (b. 1654)
- October 16 – Johann Heinrich Ernesti, German philosopher, theologian (b. 1652)
- October 30 – William Conolly, Irish politician (b. 1662)
- November 8 – Joshua Oldfield, English Presbyterian divine (b. 1656)
- November 11 – John Benedict, Connecticut politician and deacon (b. 1649)
- December – Doamna Marica Brâncoveanu, princess consort of Wallachia (b. 1661)
- December 1 – Giacomo F. Maraldi, French-Italian astronomer (b. 1665)
- December 13 – Anthony Collins, English philosopher (b. 1676)
- December 22 – Michel Baron, French actor (b. 1653)
- December 26 – Honoré Tournély, French theologian (b. 1658)
- December 27 – Olimpia Giustiniani, Italian noblewoman (b. 1641)
- date unknown – Anastasia Markovych, Ukrainian Hetmana
