= 1722 =

1722 in various calendars
- Gregorian calendar: 1722; MDCCXXII
- Ab urbe condita: 2475
- Armenian calendar: 1171; ԹՎ ՌՃՀԱ
- Assyrian calendar: 6472
- Balinese saka calendar: 1643–1644
- Bengali calendar: 1128–1129
- Berber calendar: 2672
- British Regnal year: 8 Geo. 1 – 9 Geo. 1
- Buddhist calendar: 2266
- Burmese calendar: 1084
- Byzantine calendar: 7230–7231
- Chinese calendar: 辛丑年 (Metal Ox); 4419 or 4212 — to — 壬寅年 (Water Tiger); 4420 or 4213
- Coptic calendar: 1438–1439
- Discordian calendar: 2888
- Ethiopian calendar: 1714–1715
- Hebrew calendar: 5482–5483
- Hindu calendars
- Vikram Samvat: 1778–1779
- Shaka Samvat: 1643–1644
- Kali Yuga: 4822–4823
- Holocene calendar: 11722
- Igbo calendar: 722–723
- Iranian calendar: 1100–1101
- Islamic calendar: 1134–1135
- Japanese calendar: Kyōhō 7 (享保７年)
- Javanese calendar: 1646–1647
- Julian calendar: Gregorian minus 11 days
- Korean calendar: 4055
- Minguo calendar: 190 before ROC 民前190年
- Nanakshahi calendar: 254
- Thai solar calendar: 2264–2265
- Tibetan calendar: ལྕགས་མོ་གླང་ལོ་ (female Iron-Ox); 1848 or 1467 or 695 — to — ཆུ་ཕོ་སྟག་ལོ་ (male Water-Tiger); 1849 or 1468 or 696

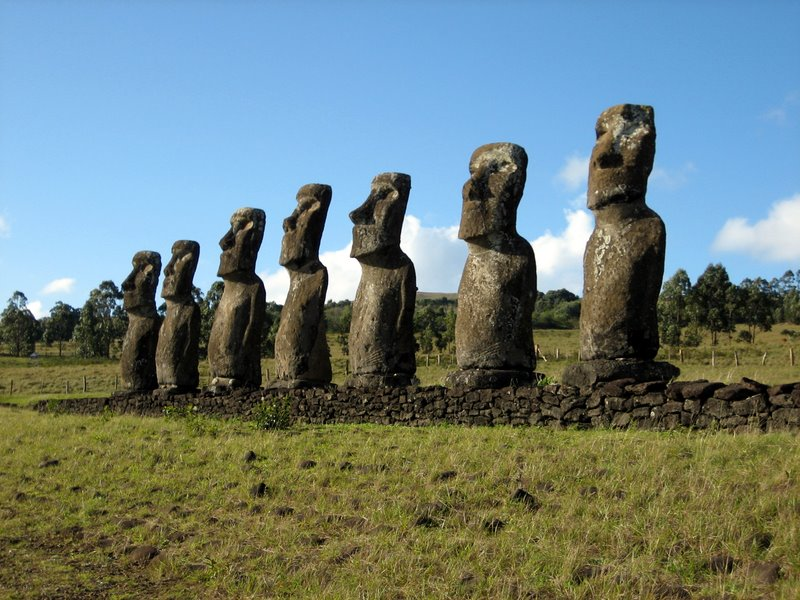
April 5: Jacob Roggeveen and crew become the first Europeans to land on Easter Island.

1722 (MDCCXXII) was a common year starting on Thursday of the Gregorian calendar and a common year starting on Monday of the Julian calendar, the 1722nd year of the Common Era (CE) and Anno Domini (AD) designations, the 722nd year of the 2nd millennium, the 22nd year of the 18th century, and the 3rd year of the 1720s decade. As of the start of 1722, the Gregorian calendar was 11 days ahead of the Julian calendar, which remained in localized use until 1923.

== Events ==
=== January–March ===
- January 27 – Daniel Defoe's novel Moll Flanders is published anonymously in London.
- February 10 – The Battle of Cape Lopez begins off of the coast of West Africa (and present-day Gabon), as the Royal Navy brings an end to the piracy of Bartholomew Roberts, nicknamed "Black Bart". Captained by Chaloner Ogle of the Royal Navy, HMS Swallow fires its cannons as Roberts sails his ship Royal Fortune toward the oncoming Swallow in order to gain time by forcing Swallow to turn around. Standing on the deck, Roberts and two of his crew are killed by the second wave of cannon fire. The remaining 272 pirate crew are captured.
- February 16 – Peter the Great, Emperor of All Russia, publishes the Law on Succession, which rejects primogeniture and requires the reigning monarch to nominate their successor with regard to worthiness.
- February 21 – Nasir-ud-Din Muḥammad Shah, the Grand Mogul of north India's Mughal Empire, names Nizam-ul-Mulk as his Grand Vizier. Three years later, the Nizam will rebel against the Grand Mogul and create his own independent nation as the Nizam of Hyderabad, reigning as Asaf Jah.
- March 8 – Battle of Gulnabad in Persia: The Pashtun people of Afghanistan, led by Mahmud Hotak, decisively defeat forces of the Persian Safavid dynasty, precipitating its fall.

=== April–June ===
- April 2 – The first Silence Dogood letter, written by Benjamin Franklin, is printed.
- April 5 (Easter Sunday) – Dutch admiral Jacob Roggeveen lands on what is now Easter Island.
- May 5 – Pennsylvania colony enacts a statute, requiring all persons importing any person previously convicted of sodomy, to pay £5 for each such incoming person.
- May 9 – The 1722 British general election (began March 19) closes with Prime Minister Robert Walpole's Whig Party increasing its majority in the House of Commons of Great Britain, capturing 48 additional seats from the Tory Party and having a 389 to 169 advantage.
- June 15 – Pirate Edward Low and his men sail the stolen ship Rebecca into Port Roseway near modern Shelburne, Nova Scotia, where 13 fishing boats from Massachusetts are anchored. Over the next few days, the pirates board the boats and lay siege to them. On June 19, Low confiscates the schooner Mary from its owner, Joseph Dolliber, outfits it with cannons and renames it the Fancy. Eight of the fishermen are taken hostage as the stolen vessel departs, including Philip Ashton.

=== July–September ===
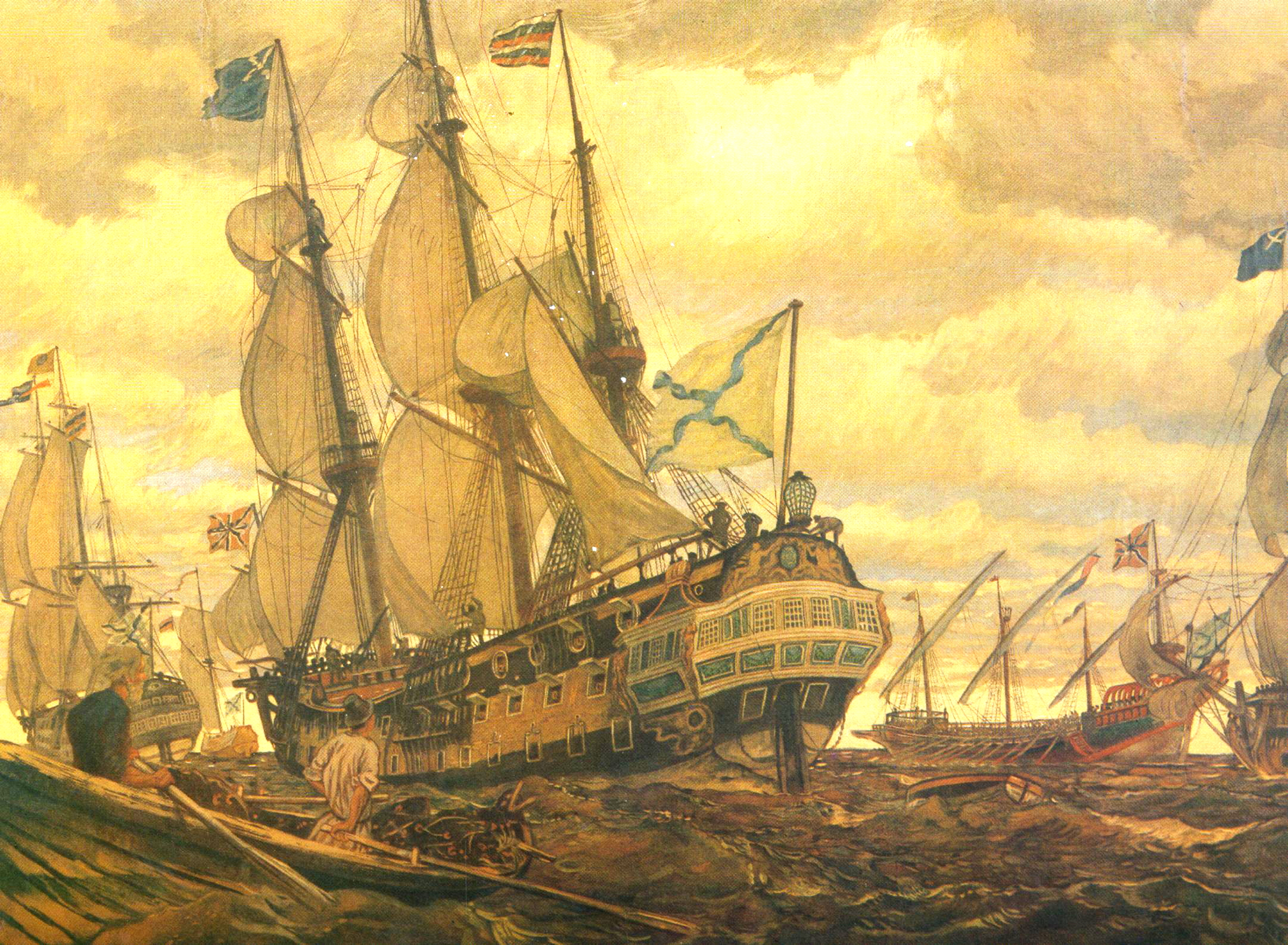
July 26: Start of the Russo-Persian War.

- July 25 – Dummer's War (1722–1725) begins along the Maine and Massachusetts border.
- July 26 (July 15 O.S.) – The Russo-Persian War (1722–1723) begins with Peter the Great's Persian campaign.
- August 24 – Francis Atterbury, Anglican Bishop of Rochester and Dean of Westminster, is arrested in his deanery and confined in the Tower of London for treason, accused of leading the Jacobite "Atterbury Plot" in support of the pretender James Francis Edward Stuart with the aim of overthrowing the House of Hanover and King George I of Great Britain and restoring the House of Stuart by installing Prince James as "King James III".
- September 6 – Wälättä Giyorgis, a 16-year-old who nursed Ethiopia's Emperor Bakaffa back to health after he fell ill, marries the Emperor and begins her rise to power as the Empress Mentewab. Upon Bakaffa's death in 1730, Mentewab becomes the regent for her son by Bakaffa, Iyasu II.
- September 23 – La Nouvelle-Orléans (New Orleans), recently established by France as the capital of the Louisiana Territory is hit by what is later called the "Great Hurricane of 1722", starting with 7 feet (2.1 m) high waves, followed by winds in excess of 100 miles per hour (160 km/h). By September 24, "Almost every public building in New Orleans, from the hospital to the cathedral" is "either unroofed or totally ruined."

=== October–December ===
- October 23 – The six-month-long Siege of Isfahan ends, when the Safavid capital Isfahan capitulates to the Afghan rebels. Safavid Sultan Husayn abdicates, and acknowledges Mahmud Hotak as the new Shah of Persia.
- November 15 (November 4 O.S.) – Russia's Emperor Peter the Great issues an order establishing the Caspian Flotilla during its war against Persia to gain complete control of the landlocked Caspian Sea.
- November 20 – The Dutch East India Company cargo ship Schoonenberg runs aground in South Africa's Struis Bay and is looted by most of its 110 crew, beginning a legend and questions of whether the wreck was part of a conspiracy or simply an accident. Almost 300 years later, the event is reconstructed in detail by investigators.
- December 20 – After the longest reign by a Chinese Emperor in history (61 years), the Kangxi Emperor dies, and is succeeded by his son Yinzhen as Yongzheng Emperor.

=== Date unknown ===
- Edenton is incorporated as the county seat of Chowan County, North Carolina. The governor and assembly of North Carolina move to Edenton, making it the de facto capital of North Carolina until 1746, when the government is moved to New Bern.
- Peter the Great of Russia creates the Table of Ranks.
- A small group of Bohemian Brethren (the "Hidden Seed") from northern Moravia are allowed to settle in a new village, Herrnhut, on the Berthelsdorf estate of the pietist Count Nicolaus Zinzendorf in Upper Lusatia (Saxony), forming the Herrnhuter Brüdergemeine, seed of the Moravian Church's renewal.
- The Chiesa del Purgatorio, Venafro, Italy, Catholic Church is built.
- The first public theatre in Denmark, Lille Grønnegade Theatre, is founded in Copenhagen.
- Modern music theory finds definition in Jean-Philippe Rameau's Traité de l'harmonie réduite à ses principes naturels (Treatise on Harmony), published in Paris.
- The "Brown Bess" muzzle-loading smoothbore musket becomes the British Army's standard infantry firearm for land combat for more than a century.
- Johann Sebastian Bach composes The Well-Tempered Clavier.

== Births ==
- January 1 – Sir George Baker, 1st Baronet, British physician (d. 1809)
- January 3 – Fredrik Hasselqvist, Swedish traveller and naturalist (d. 1752)
- January 12 – Nicolas Luckner, German in French service rising to become a Marshal of France (d. 1794)
- January 15 – Herman Scholliner, German historian (d. 1795)
- January 18 – Antonio Rodríguez de Hita, Spanish composer (d. 1787)
- January 26 – Alexander Carlyle, Scottish church leader (d. 1805)
- January 29 – Duchess Luise of Brunswick-Wolfenbüttel, Prussian princess (d. 1780)
- February 3 – Duchess Louise Frederica of Württemberg, German noble (d. 1791)
- February 4 – Antonio Greppi (1722–1799), Italian banker (d. 1799)
- February 5 – Anders Rudolf du Rietz, Swedish general, count and politician (d. 1792)
- February 7 – Azar Bigdeli, Iranian anthologist and poet (d. 1781)
- February 14 – Georg Christian Füchsel, German physician and geologist (d. 1773)
- February 19 – Charles-François Tiphaigne de la Roche, French author (d. 1774)
- February 21 – Lord Robert Manners-Sutton, British politician (d. 1762)
- February 22
  - Théophile de Bordeu, French physician (d. 1776)
  - John Redman (physician), American physician (d. 1808)

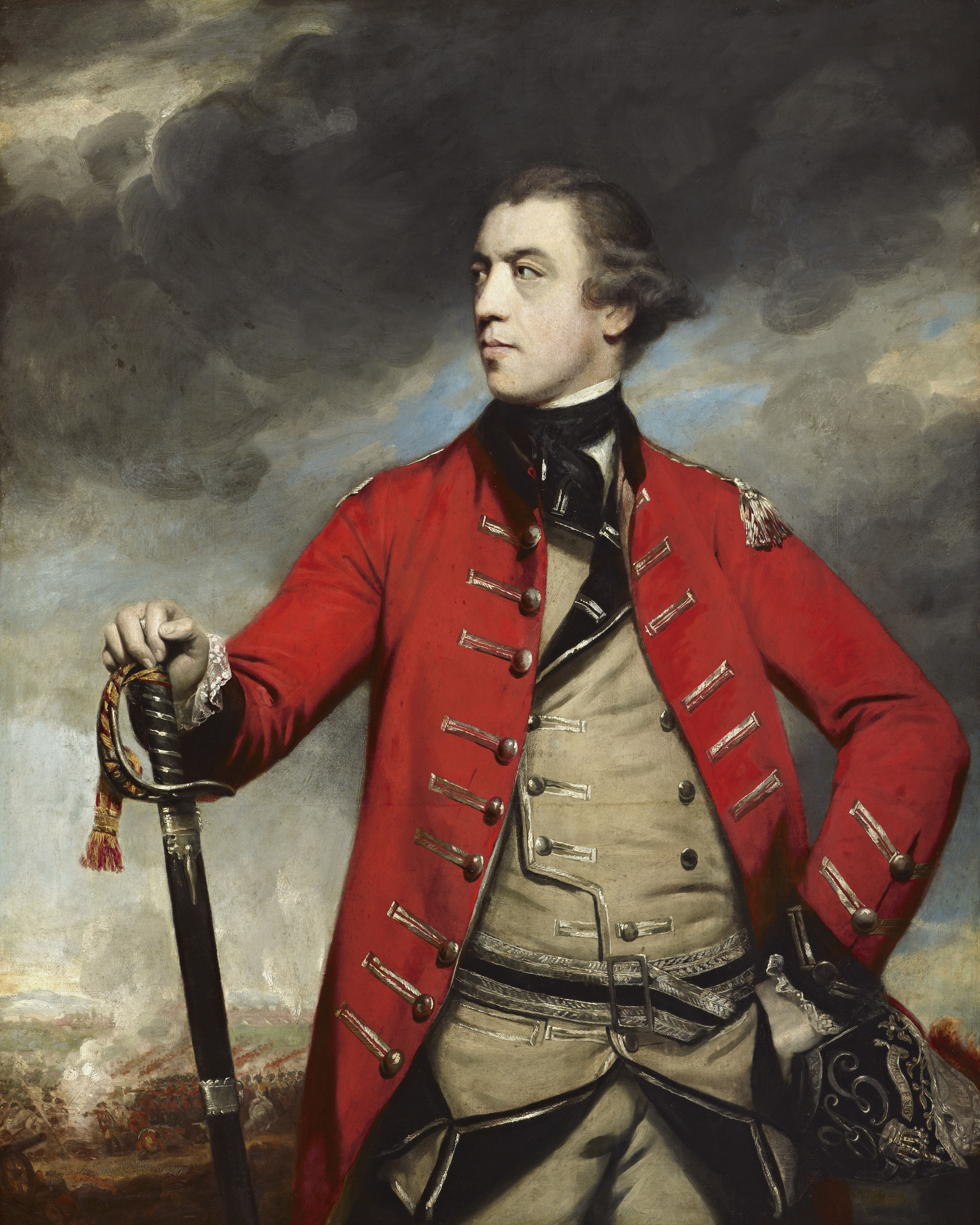
John Burgoyne

- February 24 – John Burgoyne, British army officer, playwright and politician (d. 1792)
- March 3 – Pietro Maria Gazzaniga, Italian theologian (d. 1799)
- March 6 – Johann Christian Brand, Austrian painter (d. 1795)
- March 7 – Louis-Jacques Goussier, French artist (d. 1799)
- March 15 – Gabriel Lenkiewicz, Belarusian Temporary Vicar General of the Society of Jesus (d. 1798)
- March 17 – William Wentworth, 2nd Earl of Strafford (1722–1791), England (d. 1791)
- March 18
  - Ulrika Eleonora von Düben, Swedish lady in waiting (d. 1758)
  - Heinrich XI, Prince Reuss of Greiz, German noble (d. 1800)
- March 19 – Edmund Nelson (clergyman), English priest (d. 1802)
- March 23
  - Marguerite-Thérèse Lemoine Despins, Canadian mother superior (d. 1792)
  - Jean-Baptiste Chappe d'Auteroche, French astronomer (d. 1769)
- April 8 – Jakob Friedrich Kleinknecht, German composer (d. 1794)

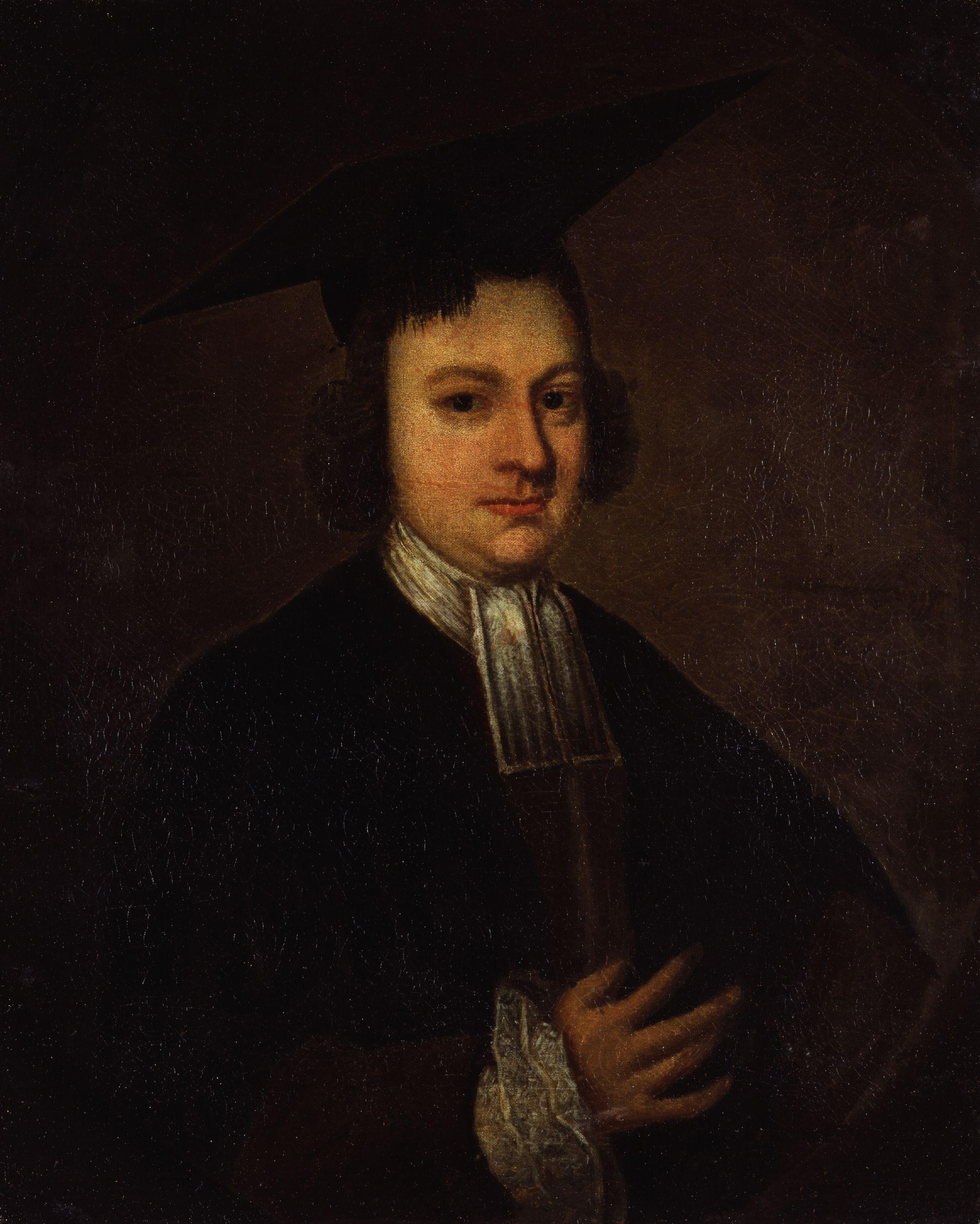
Christopher Smart

- April 11 – Christopher Smart, English poet (d. 1771)
- April 12 – Pietro Nardini, Italian composer and violinist (d. 1793)
- April 19 – Duke Clement Francis of Bavaria, German nobleman (d. 1770)
- April 22 (bapt.) – Joseph Warton, English poet and critic (d. 1800)
- April 25 – Mark Robinson (Royal Navy officer), Royal Navy admiral (d. 1799)
- April 26 – George Coventry, 6th Earl of Coventry, English noble and politician (d. 1809)
- April 29 – Francesco Carafa di Trajetto, Italian Catholic cardinal (d. 1818)
- May 2 – Gerhard Schøning, Norwegian historian (d. 1780)
- May 4
  - David Leslie, 6th Earl of Leven, British noble (d. 1802)
  - Robert McQueen, Lord Braxfield, Scottish advocate and judge (d. 1799)
- May 9 – Morgan Edwards, British historian and minister (d. 1795)
- May 11 – Petrus Camper, Dutch scientist (d. 1789)
- May 23 – Claudius Franciscus Gagnières des Granges, French martyr (d. 1792)
- May 25 – Anton Cebej, Slovenian artist (d. 1774)
- May 26 – Washington Shirley, 5th Earl Ferrers, British Royal Navy admiral (d. 1778)
- May 28 – Hugh Pigot (Royal Navy officer, born 1722), British Royal Navy admiral (d. 1792)
- May 29 – James FitzGerald, 1st Duke of Leinster (d. 1773)
- June 7 – George Paulet, 12th Marquess of Winchester, British politician (d. 1800)
- June 19 – George Gordon, 3rd Earl of Aberdeen (d. 1801)
- June 25 – St George Gore-St George, Irish politician (d. 1746)
- June 28 – Daniel Dulany the Younger, American politician (d. 1797)
- June 30 – Jiří Antonín Benda, Bohemian composer (d. 1795)
- July 1 – Vasily Dolgorukov-Krymsky, Russian general (d. 1782)
- July 11 – Prince George William of Hesse-Darmstadt, German prince (d. 1782)
- July 14 – Jean-Pierre du Teil, French general (d. 1794)
- July 16 – Joseph Wilton, English sculptor (d. 1803)
- July 21 – James Colebrooke, British baronet (d. 1761)
- July 23
  - Antoine Petit, French physician (d. 1794)
  - Anne-Catherine de Ligniville, Madame Helvétius, French salon holder (d. 1800)
- July 25 – Jakab Fellner, Hungarian architect (d. 1780)
- August 1 – Anne Marie Louise de La Tour d'Auvergne, French princess (d. 1739)
- August 5 – William Fortescue, 1st Earl of Clermont, Irish politician (d. 1806)
- August 9 – Prince Augustus William of Prussia (d. 1758)
- August 11 – Richard Brocklesby, British doctor (d. 1797)
- August 12 – Giuseppe Baldrighi, Italian painter (d. 1803)
- August 14 – Sir Thomas Dyke Acland, 7th Baronet (d. 1785)
- August 22
  - Constantine Phipps, 1st Baron Mulgrave of Ireland (d. 1775)
  - Josef Georg Hörl, Austrian politician (d. 1806)
- August 24 – John Gilbert Cooper, British poet and writer (d. 1769)
- September 1 – Karl Gotthelf von Hund, German baron (d. 1776)
- September 2
  - Vigilius Eriksen, Danish artist (died 1782)
  - William Crawford, American soldier and surveyor (died 1782)
- September 5 – Frederick Christian, Elector of Saxony (d. 1763)
- September 6 – Christian IV, Count Palatine of Zweibrücken, German noble (d. 1775)
- September 7 – Ernst Anton Nicolai, German chemist (d. 1802)
- September 13 – John Home, Scottish minister, soldier, author (d. 1808)
- September 16 – Gabriel Christie (British Army officer), British Army general (d. 1799)
- September 21 – Gisela Agnes of Anhalt-Köthen, Princess of Anhalt-Köthen by birth and by marriage Princess of Anhalt-Dessau (d. 1751)

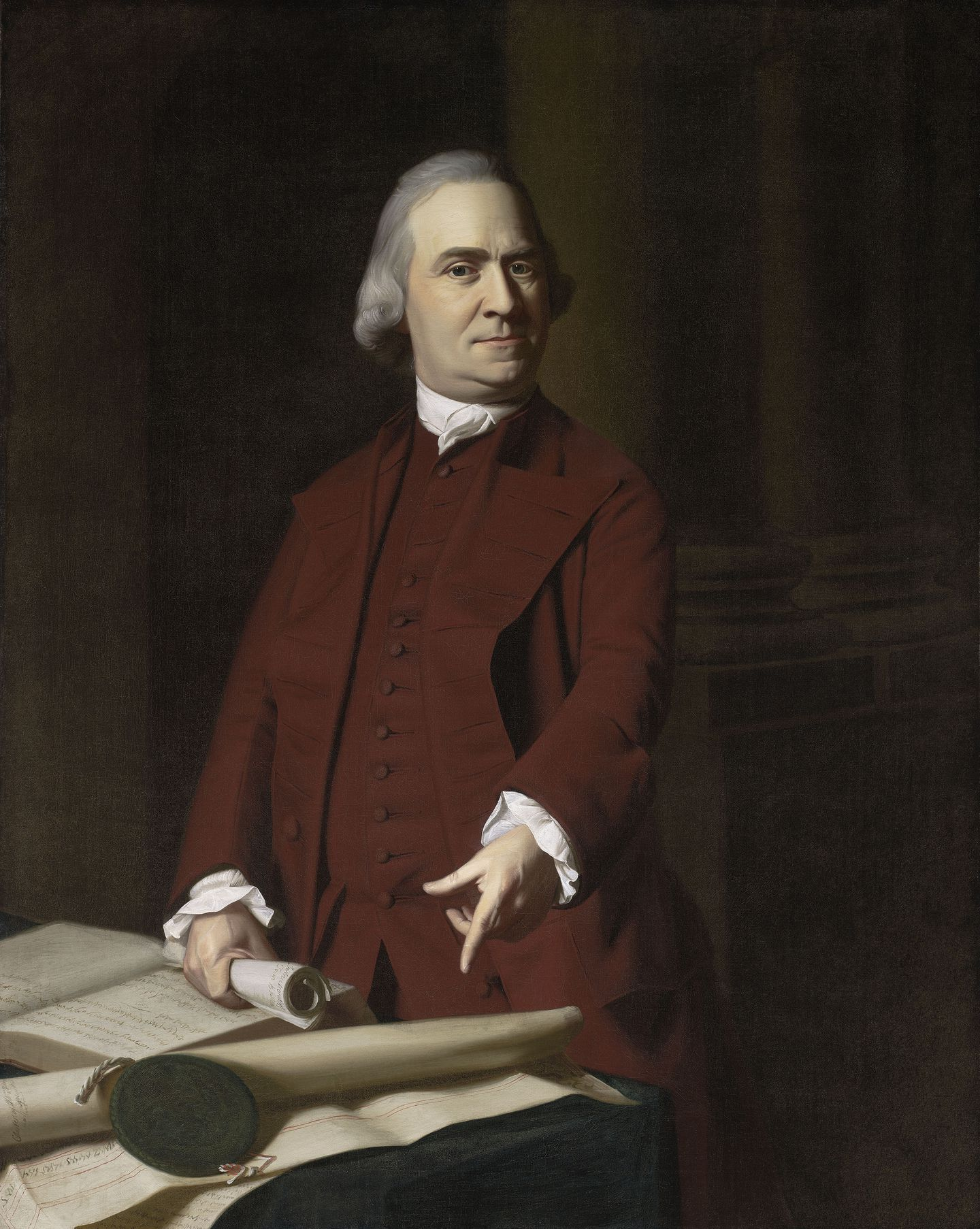
Samuel Adams

- September 27 – Samuel Adams, Boston politician, leader in the American Revolution (d. 1803)
- October 2 – Leopold Widhalm, Austrian luthier (d. 1776)
- October 3 – Johann Heinrich Tischbein, German artist (d. 1789)
- October 5 – Richard Hotham, English property developer and politician (d. 1799)
- October 10 – Humphry Marshall, American botanist (d. 1801)
- October 20 – Joachim Edler von Popper, Austrian banker (d. 1795)
- October 24 – Dominic Schram, German theologian (d. 1797)
- October 31 – Princess Ulrike Friederike Wilhelmine of Hesse-Kassel, German princess (d. 1787)
- November 4 – Raphael Cohen, German rabbi (d. 1803)
- November 5 – William Byron, 5th Baron Byron, English dueller (d. 1798)
- November 11 – Nicolas Antoine Boulanger, French philosopher (d. 1759)
- November 18 – Ichijō Michika, Japanese court noble (d. 1769)
- November 19
  - Leopold Auenbrugger, Austrian physician (d. 1809)
  - Benjamin Chew, Chief Justice of colonial Pennsylvania (d. 1810)
- November 21 – Richard Bampfylde, British politician (d. 1776)
- November 22 – Marc Antoine René de Voyer, French noble (d. 1787)
- November 25 – Heinrich Johann Nepomuk von Crantz, Luxembourgian botanist (d. 1799)
- November 30 – Théodore Gardelle, Swiss painter, enameller (d. 1761)
- December 1
  - Jean-Pierre de Bougainville, French writer (d. 1763)
  - Anna Louisa Karsch, German poet (d. 1791)
  - Dunbar Douglas, 4th Earl of Selkirk, Scottish peer (d. 1799)
- December 4 – Guillaume Piguel, French-born Apostolic Vicar of Cochin (d. 1771)
- December 12 – Charles Wallop, British politician (d. 1771)
- December 20 – Joseph O'Donnell Sr., Irish soldier (d. 1787)
- December 24 – Sampson Sammons, American army officer (d. 1796)
- December 28
  - John Pitcairn, British Marine officer who was stationed in Boston (d. 1775)
  - Eliza Lucas, American agronomist (d. 1793)
- December 30 – Charles Yorke, Lord Chancellor of Great Britain (d. 1770)
- date unknown – Flora MacDonald, Scottish heroine (d. 1790)
- probable – Hyder Ali, Indian general, Sultan of Mysore (d. 1782)

== Deaths ==
- January 7 – Antoine Coypel, French painter (b. 1661)
- January 21 – Charles Paulet, 2nd Duke of Bolton, English supporter of William III of England (b. 1661)
- January 23 – Henri de Boulainvilliers, French nobleman (b. 1658)
- January 29 – Carl Gustav Rehnskiöld, Swedish military leader (b. 1651)
- February 5 – Éléonore Desmier d'Olbreuse, Duchess of Braunschweig-Lüneburg (b. 1639)
- February 10 – Bartholomew Roberts, Welsh pirate (b. 1682)
- March 11 – John Toland, Irish philosopher (b. 1670)
- March 31 – Eberhard von Danckelmann, Prime Minister of Brandenburg-Prussia (b. 1643)
- April 13 – Charles Leslie, Irish Anglican theologian (b. 1650)
- April 21 – Robert Beverley, Jr., historian of Colonial Virginia (b. 1673)
- May 20 – Sébastien Vaillant, French botanist (b. 1669)
- June 5 – Johann Kuhnau, German composer (b. 1660)

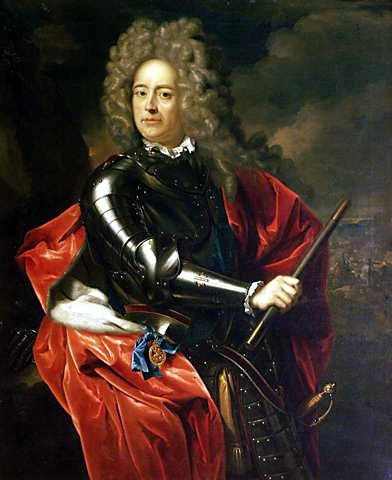
John Churchill, 1st Duke of Marlborough

- June 16
  - John Churchill, 1st Duke of Marlborough, English general (b. 1650)
  - Marc'Antonio Zondadari, Italian-born 65th Grandmaster of the Knights Hospitaller (b. 1658)
- July 16 – Maria Angela Caterina d'Este, Italian princess (b. 1656)
- August 20 – John Coney (silversmith), early American silversmith/goldsmith (b. 1655)
- September 18 – André Dacier, French classical scholar (b. 1651)
- September 20 – John Lauder, Lord Fountainhall, Scottish jurist (b. 1646)
- October 8 – Gerard Callenburgh, Dutch admiral (b. 1642)
- November 12 – Adriaen van der Werff, Dutch painter (b. 1659)
- November 20 – Johann Adam Reincken, German organist (b. 1643)
- December 5 – Marie Anne de La Trémoille, princesse des Ursins, politically active Spanish court official (b. 1642)
- December 8 – Elizabeth Charlotte, Princess Palatine, wife to Philippe I, Duke of Orléans (b. 1652)

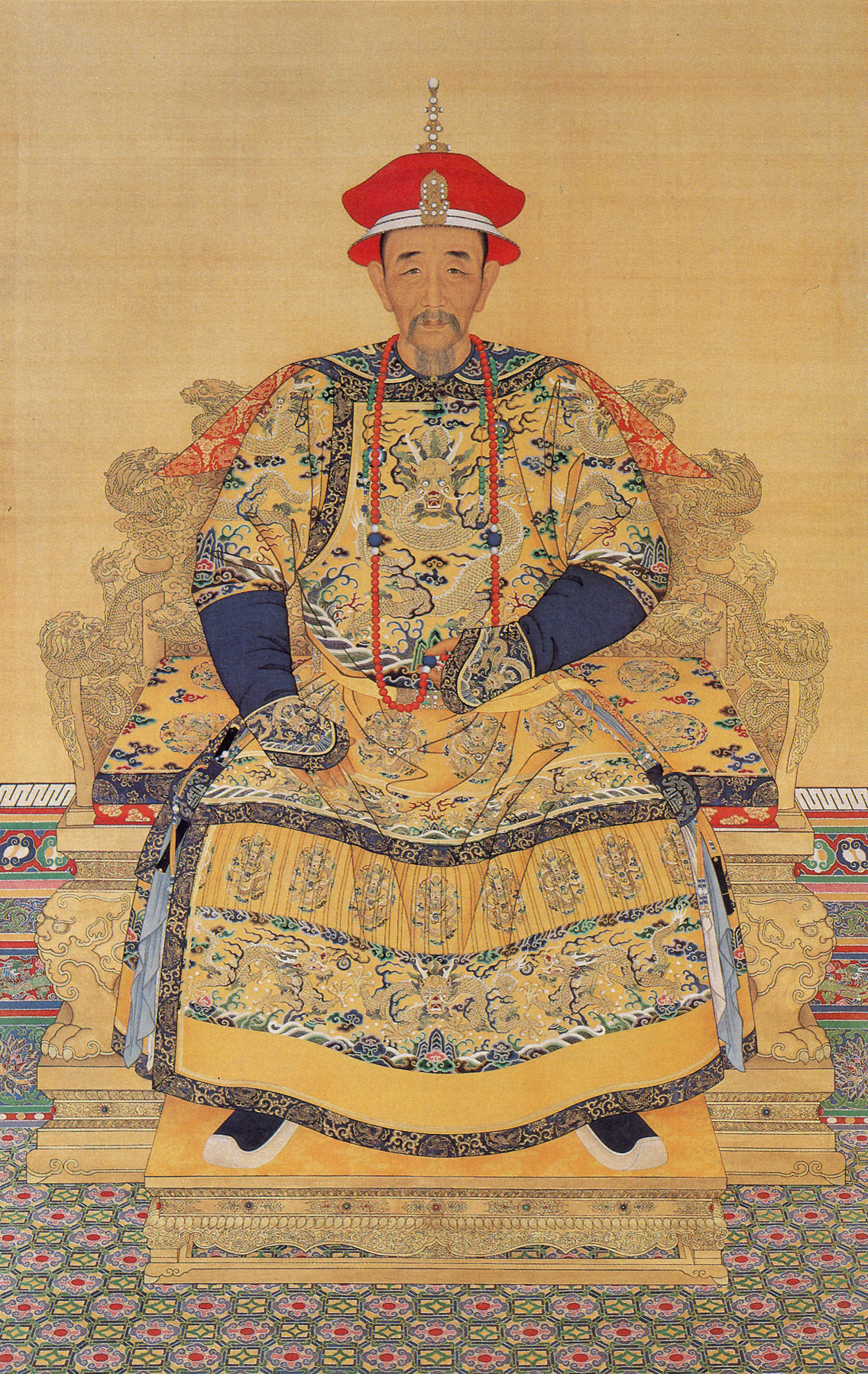
Kangxi Emperor

- December 20 – Kangxi Emperor of China (b. 1654)
- December 23 – Pierre Varignon, French mathematician (b. 1654)
