= 1761 =

1761 in various calendars
- Gregorian calendar: 1761; MDCCLXI
- Ab urbe condita: 2514
- Armenian calendar: 1210; ԹՎ ՌՄԺ
- Assyrian calendar: 6511
- Balinese saka calendar: 1682–1683
- Bengali calendar: 1167–1168
- Berber calendar: 2711
- British Regnal year: 1 Geo. 3 – 2 Geo. 3
- Buddhist calendar: 2305
- Burmese calendar: 1123
- Byzantine calendar: 7269–7270
- Chinese calendar: 庚辰年 (Metal Dragon); 4458 or 4251 — to — 辛巳年 (Metal Snake); 4459 or 4252
- Coptic calendar: 1477–1478
- Discordian calendar: 2927
- Ethiopian calendar: 1753–1754
- Hebrew calendar: 5521–5522
- Hindu calendars
- Vikram Samvat: 1817–1818
- Shaka Samvat: 1682–1683
- Kali Yuga: 4861–4862
- Holocene calendar: 11761
- Igbo calendar: 761–762
- Iranian calendar: 1139–1140
- Islamic calendar: 1174–1175
- Japanese calendar: Hōreki 11 (宝暦１１年)
- Javanese calendar: 1686–1687
- Julian calendar: Gregorian minus 11 days
- Korean calendar: 4094
- Minguo calendar: 151 before ROC 民前151年
- Nanakshahi calendar: 293
- Thai solar calendar: 2303–2304
- Tibetan calendar: ལྕགས་ཕོ་འབྲུག་ལོ་ (male Iron-Dragon); 1887 or 1506 or 734 — to — ལྕགས་མོ་སྦྲུལ་ལོ་ (female Iron-Snake); 1888 or 1507 or 735

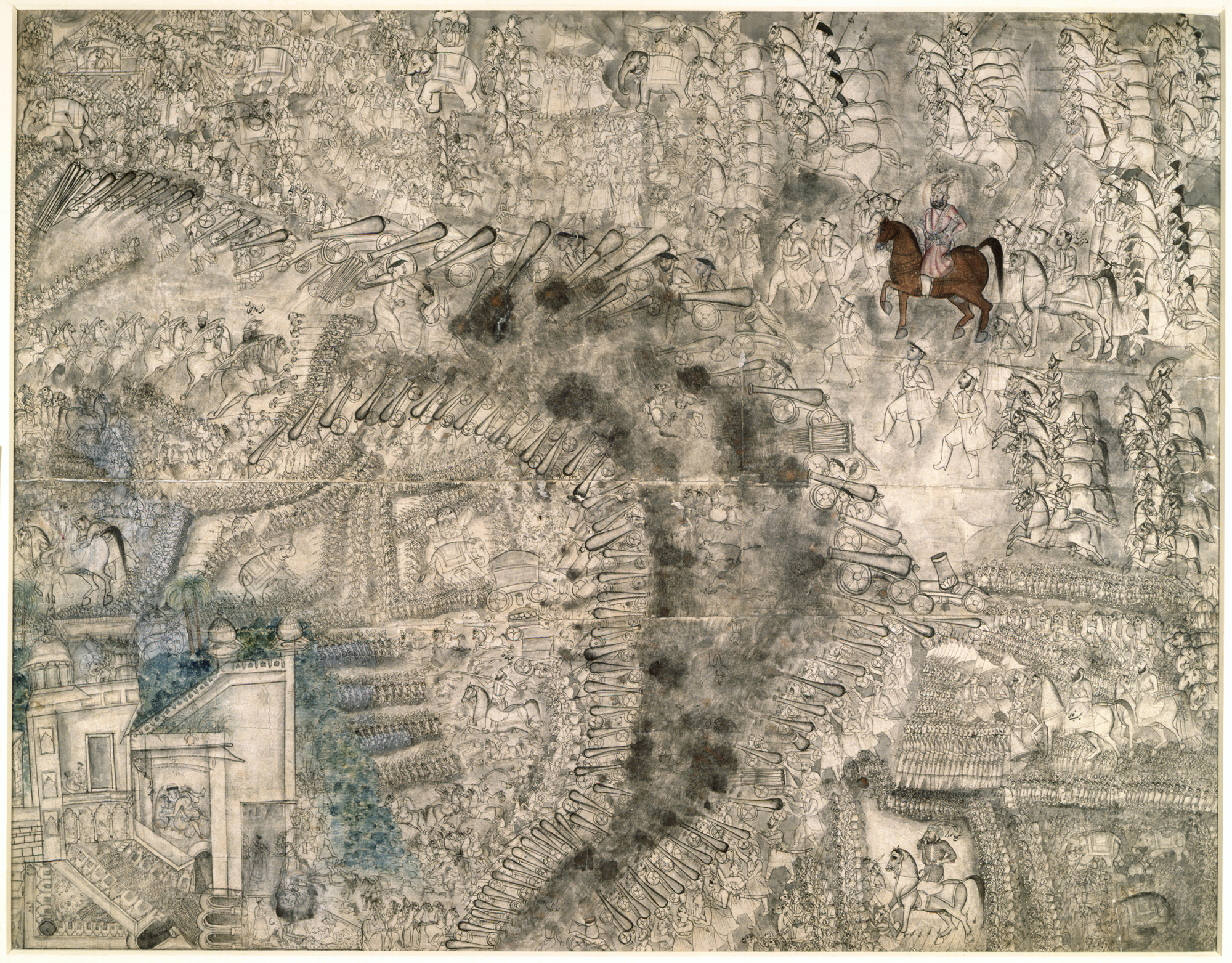
Ahmad Shah Durrani and Najib Khan Yousafzai with their coalition defeat the Maratha Confederacy in the Third Battle of Panipat, which was the largest number of fatalities (100,000 or more) in a single day reported in a classic formation battle between two armies.

1761 (MDCCLXI) was a common year starting on Thursday of the Gregorian calendar and a common year starting on Monday of the Julian calendar, the 1761st year of the Common Era (CE) and Anno Domini (AD) designations, the 761st year of the 2nd millennium, the 61st year of the 18th century, and the 2nd year of the 1760s decade. As of the start of 1761, the Gregorian calendar was 11 days ahead of the Julian calendar, which remained in localized use until 1923.

== Events ==
=== January–March ===
- January 14 – Third Battle of Panipat: In India, the armies of the Durrani Empire from Afghanistan, led by Ahmad Shah Durrani and his coalition decisively defeat the Maratha Confederacy, killing over 100,000 Maratha soldiers and civilians in battle and in a subsequent massacre, regaining territory lost by the Mughal Empire and restoring the Mughal Emperor, Shah Alam II, to the throne in Delhi as the nominal ruler.
- January 16 – In India, the Siege of Pondicherry ends as the British Empire captures Pondichéry from the French colonial empire.
- February 8 – An earthquake in London breaks chimneys in Limehouse and Poplar.
- March 8 – A second earthquake occurs in North London, Hampstead and Highgate.
- March 31 – An 8.5 magnitude earthquake strikes Lisbon in the Kingdom of Portugal, with effects felt as far north as Scotland, but few deaths are reported because of censorship by the Portuguese government.

=== April–June ===
- April 1 – The Austrian Empire and the Russian Empire sign a new treaty of alliance.
- April 4 – A severe epidemic of influenza breaks out in London and "practically the entire population of the city" is afflicted; particularly contagious to pregnant women, the disease causes an unusual number of miscarriages and premature births.
- April 14 – Thomas Boone is transferred south to become the Royal Governor of South Carolina after proving to be unable to work with the local assembly as the Royal Governor of New Jersey.
- May 4 – The first multiple death tornado in the 13 American colonies strikes Charleston, South Carolina, killing eight people and sinking five ships in harbor.
- May 9 – Exhibition of 1761, the inaugural exhibition of the Society of Artists of Great Britain opens at Spring Gardens in London
- June 6 – (May 26 old style); A transit of Venus occurs, and is observed from 120 locations around the Earth. In his observations by telescope at St. Petersburg, Mikhail Lomonosov notes a ring of light around the planet's silhouette as it begins the transit, and becomes the first astronomer to discover that the planet Venus has an atmosphere.

=== July–September ===
- July 17 – The first section of the Bridgewater Canal is opened, for the transportation of coal from local mines to Manchester.
- August 6 – The Parlement of Paris votes to close all colleges, associations and seminaries associated with the Jesuit Order, following a long campaign by Louis-Adrien Le Paige.
- August 11 – Two years after his marriage to Martha Custis and his move to Mount Vernon, American military officer and politician George Washington advertises a reward in the Maryland Gazette for the capture of four fugitive slaves who ran away from him: Cupid, Peros, Jack and Neptune, claiming in the gazette that they had escaped "without the least suspicion, provocation, or difference with anybody".
- August 15 – The Third Family Compact is executed by King Charles III of Spain and King Louis XV of France, as well as representatives of members of the House of Bourbon, King Ferdinand IV of Naples and Philip, Duke of Parma.
- August 29 – Cherokee chief Attakullakulla and British Army officer Major James Grant meet at Fort Prince George in the Province of South Carolina and begin negotiations to end the Anglo-Cherokee War.
- September 8 – George III marries Charlotte of Mecklenburg-Strelitz.
- September 19 – Slavery in Portugal is abolished.
- September 22 – George III and Charlotte of Mecklenburg-Strelitz are crowned.

=== October–December ===
- October 1 – Austrian field marshal Ernst Gideon von Laudon captures the Prussian town of Schweidnitz (now Świdnica in Poland) during the Seven Years' War.
- October 5 – William Pitt is dismissed from his position as Secretary of State for the Southern Department after having been a powerful part of a coalition government with the Prime Minister, the Duke of Newcastle.
- October 30 – Colonel Henry Bouquet issues the first proclamation against Anglo-American settlement on Indian lands in America.
- November 7 – The New London Harbor Light is first lit to guide ships into the Connecticut harbor; the lighthouse, only the fourth to be built has been in continuous operation for more than 250 years.
- November 11 – The Earl of Egremont, serving as Secretary of State for the Southern Department, initiated a policy which forbids the issuing of any land grants to white settlers in territory occupied by the American Indian tribes.
- November 19 – A separate peace treaty is signed between the Cherokee Indians and the Colony of Virginia, bringing the Anglo-Cherokee War to a close.
- November 26 – A 500-man force from the Army of Spain brings the revolt of Mexico's Maya population to an end, capturing the Yucatan village of Cisteil, killing about 500 of the 2,500 Mayan defenders and losing 40 of their own. The Spaniards arrest 254 people, including Jacinto Canek, who had proclaimed himself as King Canek Montezuma of the Mayas. Canek and eight other rebellion leaders are executed less than three weeks later.
- December 16 – Seven Years' War: After four months of siege, the Russians under Pyotr Rumyantsev take the Prussian fortress of Kolberg.

=== Date unknown ===
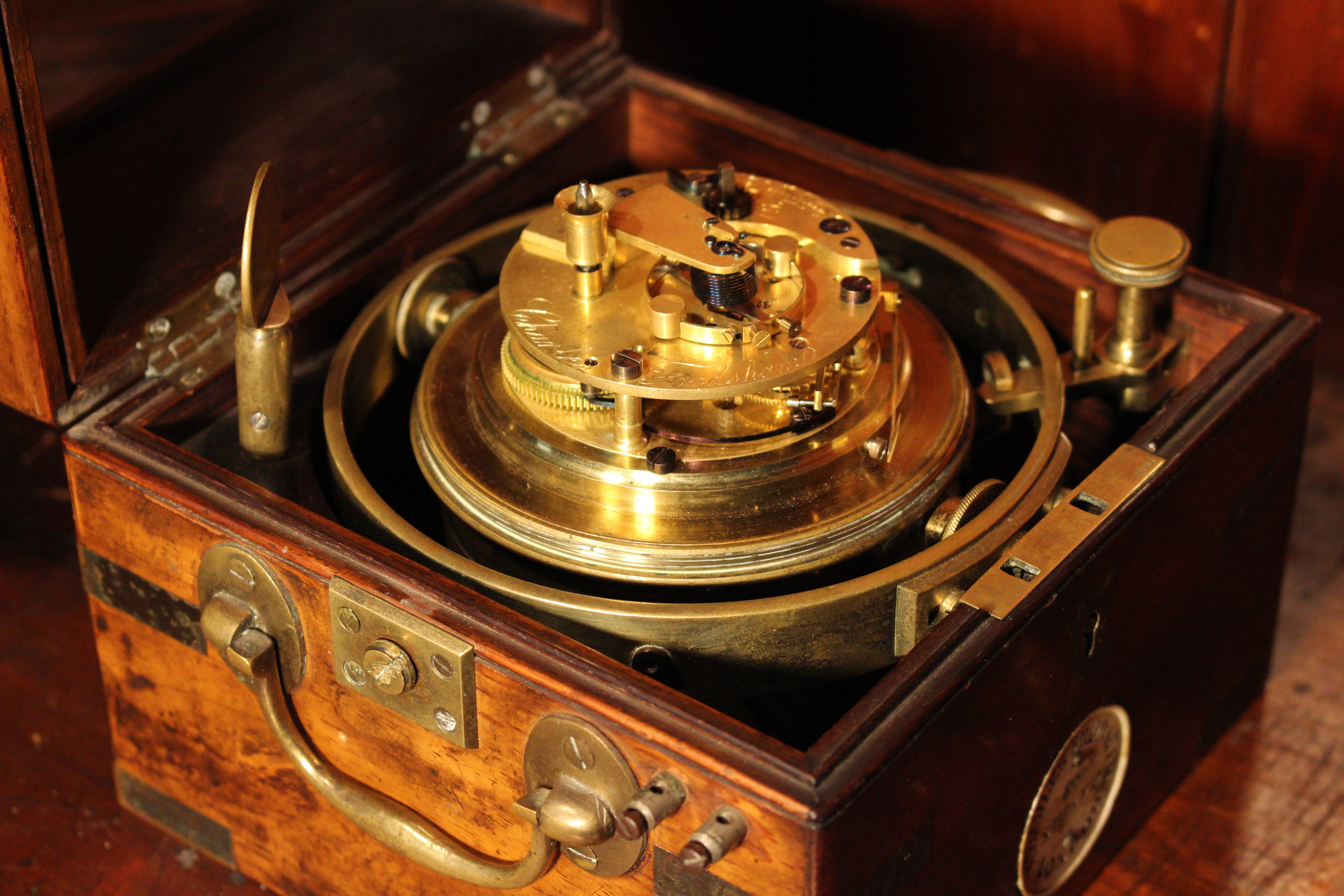
Marine chronometer

- The Halifax Treaties are concluded between the various bands of the Miꞌkmaq, other First Nations people and the British in Halifax, Nova Scotia, notably in the Burying the Hatchet ceremony on June 25.
- In Dutch Guyana, a "state" formed by escaped slaves signs a treaty with the local governor.
- Marine chronometer invented as a means to accurately determine longitude.
- Matthew Boulton's Soho Manufactory opens in the midlands of England.
- The music for "Ah! vous dirai-je, maman" ("Ah, would I tell you Mom?") is first published in France by a Monsieur Bouin in his book Les Amusements d'une Heure et Demy; in 1806, English poet Jane Taylor publishes her poem, The Star, whose words fit the rhythm of the tune and become the children's song Twinkle Twinkle Little Star.
- Faber-Castell Company is founded by Kasper Faber in Nuremberg, Germany.
- Johann Heinrich Lambert finds a proof that π is irrational.
- l'Ordre des Chevaliers Maçons Élus Coëns de l'Univers is founded.

== Births ==
- January 17 – James Hall, Scottish geologist (d. 1832)
- February 1 – Christian Hendrik Persoon, South African mycologist (d. 1836)
- February 3 – Dorothea von Medem, Latvian diplomat, duchess of Courland (d. 1821)
- February 16 – Charles Pichegru, French general (d. 1804)
- February 22 – Erik Tulindberg, Finnish composer (d. 1814)
- March 6 – Antoine-Francois Andreossy, French general (d. 1828)
- May 3 – August von Kotzebue, German dramatist (d. 1819)
- June 3 – Henry Shrapnel, British Army officer and inventor (d. 1842)

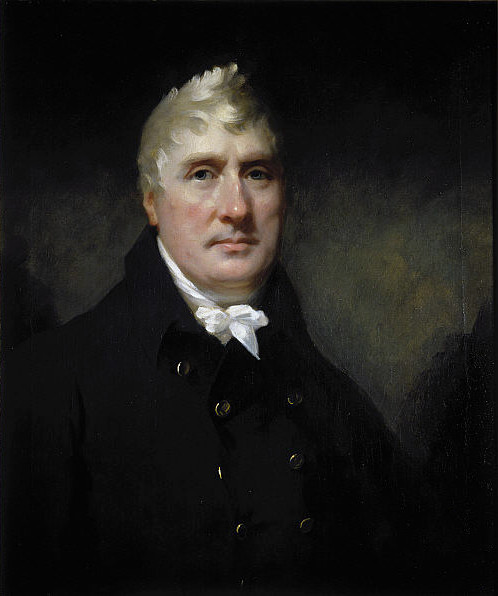
John Rennie the Elder

- June 7 – John Rennie the Elder, Scottish-born civil engineer (d. 1821)
- August 17 – Levi Hutchins, American clockmaker, nventor of the alarm clock (d. 1855)
- October 21 – Louis Albert Guislain Bacler d'Albe, French painter and cartographer (d. 1824)
- October 27 – Matthew Baillie, Scottish physician and pathologist (d. 1823)
- November 4 – Bertrand Andrieu, French engraver of medals (d. 1822)
- November 13 – John Moore, British general (d. 1809)
- November 20 – Pope Pius VIII (d. 1830)
- December 1 – Marie Tussaud, French wax modeller (d. 1850)
- December 24 – Jean-Louis Pons, French astronomer (d. 1831)

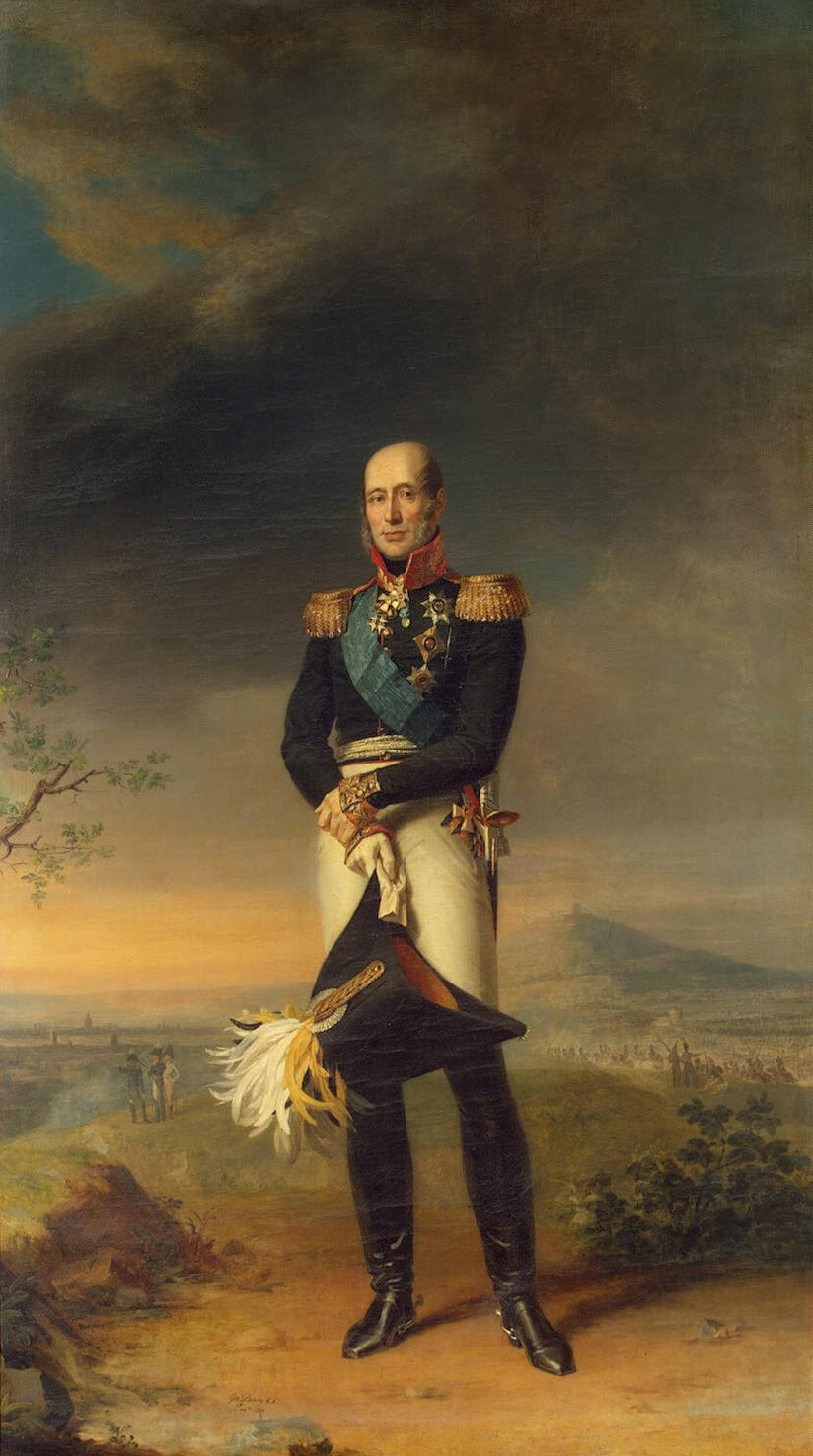
Michael Andreas Barclay de Tolly

- December 27 – Michael Andreas Barclay de Tolly, Russian military commander (d. 1818)
- Date unknown – Dido Elizabeth Belle, British slave heiress (d. 1804)

== Deaths ==
- January 4 – Stephen Hales, English physiologist, chemist, and inventor (b. 1677)
- January 7 – Darkey Kelly, Irish madam and serial murderer, executed by burning

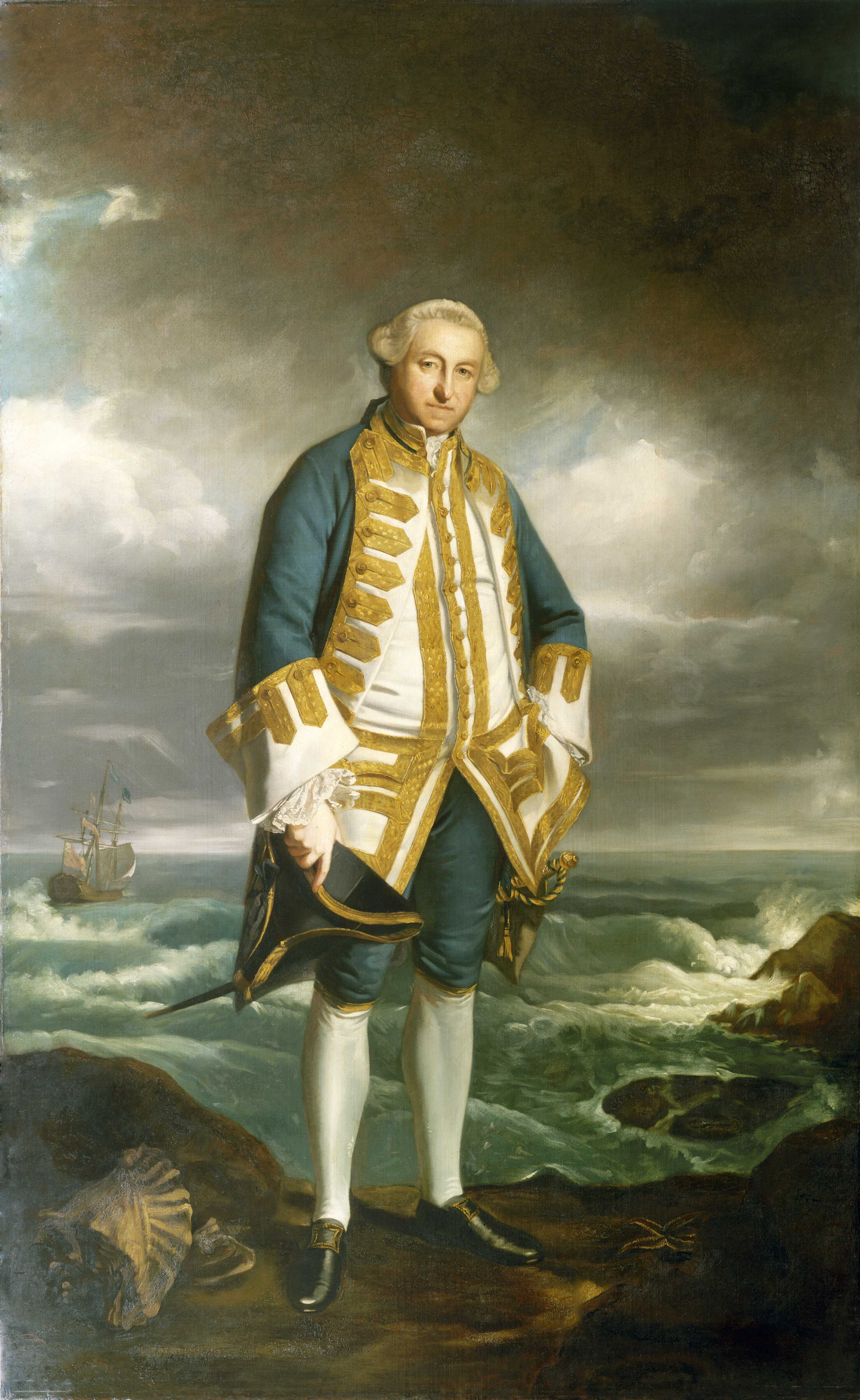
Edward Boscawen

- January 10 – Edward Boscawen, British admiral (b. 1711)
- January 26 – Charles Louis Auguste Fouquet, duc de Belle-Isle, French general and statesman (b. 1684)
- February 1 – Pierre François Xavier de Charlevoix, French historian (b. 1682)
- February 6 – Clemens August of Bavaria, Archbishop-Elector of Cologne (b. 1700)
- April 2 – William Sawyer, English cricketer (b. 1712)
- April 4 – Theodore Gardelle, Swiss painter, enameler (b. 1722)
- April 9 – William Law, English minister (b. 1686)
- April 15
  - Archibald Campbell, 3rd Duke of Argyll, Scottish politician (b. 1682)
  - William Oldys, English antiquarian and bibliographer (b. 1696)
- April 17 – Thomas Bayes, English mathematician (b. c. 1702)
- May 1 – August Friedrich Müller, German legal scholar, logician (b. 1684)
- May 10
  - James Colebrooke, British baronet (b. 1722)
  - Richard Edgcumbe, 2nd Baron Edgcumbe, British baron, politician (b. 1716)
- May 14 – Thomas Simpson, English mathematician (b. 1710)
- June 2 – Jonas Alströmer, Swedish industrialist (b. 1685)
- June 29 – Princess Elisabeth Albertine of Saxe-Hildburghausen, Duchess consort of Mecklenburg-Strelitz (b. 1713)
- July 4 – Samuel Richardson, English writer (b. 1689)
- July 9 – Carl Gotthelf Gerlach, German organist (b. 1704)
- July 13 – Tokugawa Ieshige, Japanese shōgun (b. 1712)
- July 16 – Jacob Fortling, Danish sculptor (b. 1711)
- August 3 – Johann Matthias Gesner, German classical scholar (b. 1691)
- September 8 – Bernard Forest de Bélidor, French engineer (b. 1698)
- October 22 – Louis George, Margrave of Baden-Baden (b. 1702)
- October 25 – Gioacchino Conti, Italian opera singer (b. 1714)
- November 21 – Charles Holmes, British Royal Navy admiral (b. 1711)
- November 30 – John Dollond, English optician (b. 1706)
- December 9 – Tarabai, Indian queen regent of the Maratha Empire (b. 1675)
- December 15 – John Willes (judge), English lawyer (b. 1685)
- December 23 – Alestair Ruadh MacDonnell, Scottish Jacobite spy (b. c. 1725)
- December 25 – Princess Dorothea of Schleswig-Holstein-Sonderburg-Beck, German noble (b. 1685)
- date unknown – Aldegonde Jeanne Pauli, banker in the Austrian Netherlands (b. 1685)
