= Zelinka =

Zelinka (Czech/Slovak feminine: Zelinková) is a Czech and Slovak surname. In both languages, zelený means 'green'. Notable people with the surname include:

- Andreas Zelinka (1802–1868), Czech-Austrian politician, a Mayor of Vienna
- Jessica Zelinka (born 1981), Canadian athlete
- Miroslav Zelinka (born 1981), Czech football referee
- Peter Zelinka (1957–2021), Slovak biathlete
