= Josef Kriehuber =

Austrian lithographer and painter (1800–1876)

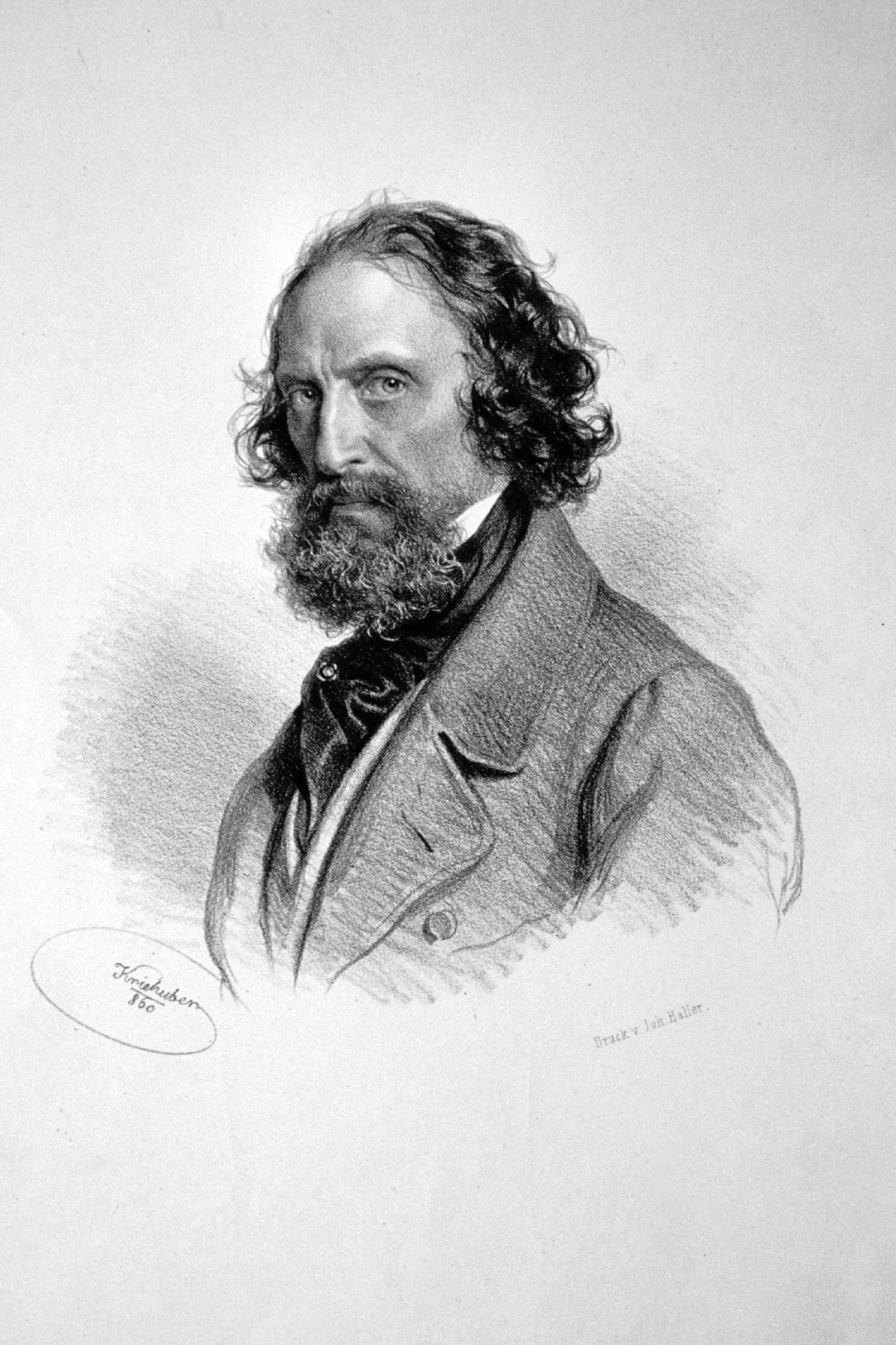
- Self-portrait of Kriehuber, lithography, 1860
- Born: 14 December 1800; Vienna, Austria, Holy Roman Empire
- Died: 30 May 1876 (aged 75); Vienna, Austria-Hungary
- Occupations: Lithographer; painter

Josef Kriehuber (14 December 1800 – 30 May 1876) was an Austrian lithographer and painter, notable for the high quality of his lithographic portraits. A prolific yet meticulous artist, he made numerous portraits of near-photographic detail for nobility, well-known personalities, and government officials. Josef Kriehuber left more than 3000 lithographs, with portraits of many people including some of the most illustrious figures of mid-19th century Central Europe.

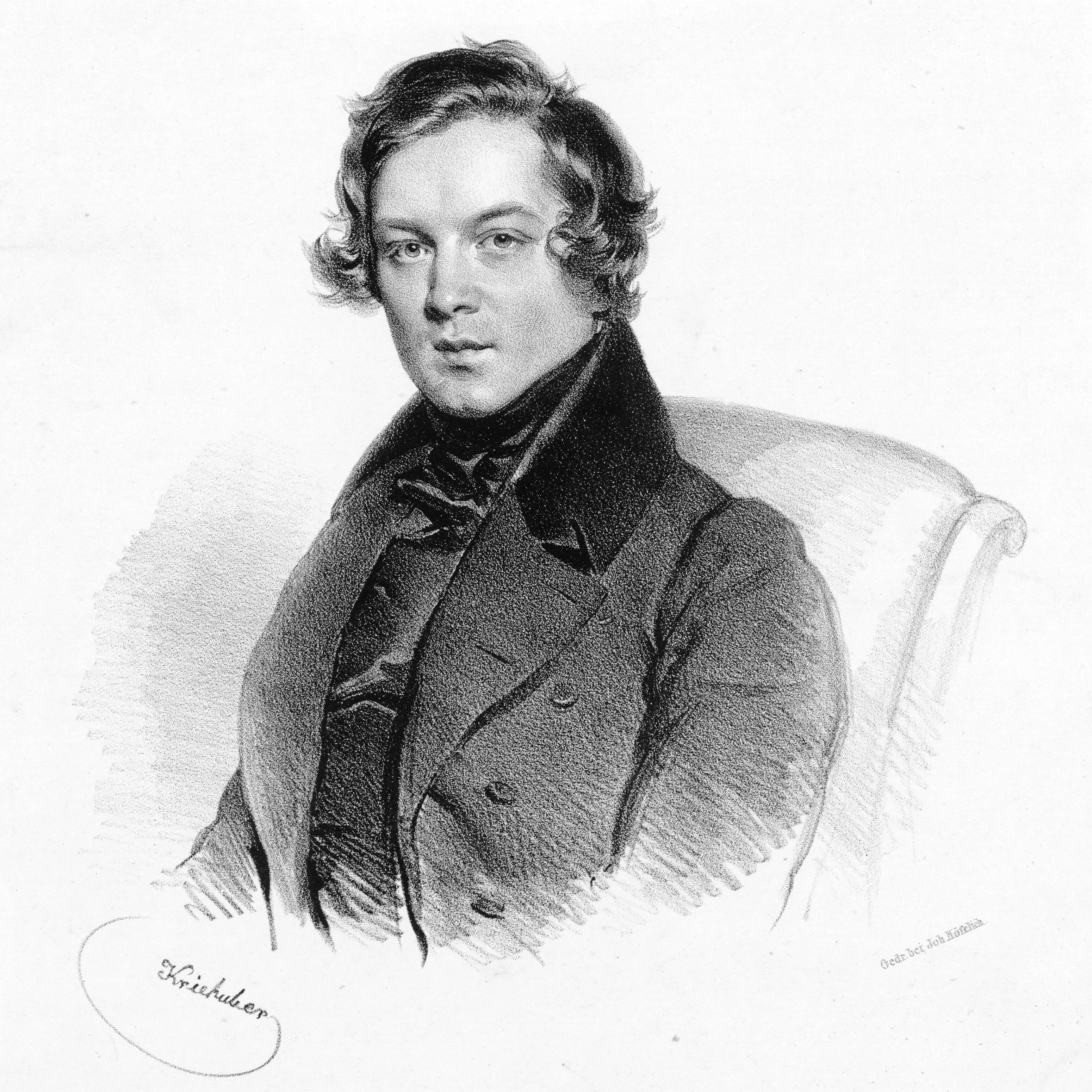
Robert Schumann, Lithograph by Josef Kriehuber, in 1839

== Life ==
Josef Kriehuber was born in Vienna, Austria on 14 December 1800. He was first trained by his brother Johann Kriehuber, then studied at the Vienna Academy under Hubert Maurer, then moved to Galicia, where he devoted himself to horse painting. He worked as a lithographer for several Viennese publishing houses. With nearly 3,000 works, Josef Kriehuber was the most important portrait lithographer of the Viennese Biedermeier period. Kriehuber is also noted for his studies of the Prater park. He taught at the Vienna Theresianum academy.

Kriehuber was only 13 years old when he went to the art-class in the Imperial Academy in Vienna. In 1818, he accompanied the prince Sanguszko as a drawing-master to Poland. In 1821 he returned to Vienna. To earn himself money for the course at the academy, and for the cost of living, he became one of the most industrious lithographic employees of the publishing company Trentsensky. In 1826, his first portraits using the new printing technique of lithography appear. In the next few decades, Kriehuber becomes the most sought-after and best-paid portraitist of Biedermeier Vienna. His success probably stems from the fact that he is a master of portraying men as more distinguished, and women as prettier, than they are in reality.

His works, an extensive portrait album of the Viennese society of this epoch, include nearly 3000 portrait-lithographs, along with a few hundred water-colours. There are but few well-known persons of that time who did not have their portrait made by Kriehuber. Names include: Ludwig van Beethoven, Francis I of Austria, Fürst von Metternich, Josef Radetzky, Franz Grillparzer, Johann Nestroy, Archduke Johann, Friedrich Halm, Friedrich Hebbel, Hammer-Purgstall, Franz Schubert, Anton Diabelli, Robert Schumann, Giacomo Meyerbeer, Carl Czerny, Franz Liszt, Sigismond Thalberg, Ole Bull, Niccolò Paganini, Elias Parish Alvars, Fritz Reuter, Therese Krones, Fanny Elßler, Archduke Karl Ludwig, Sophie of Austria, Marie-Louise of Austria, Johann Kaspar von Seiller, Hector Berlioz, Stephan Endlicher, Ignaz von Seyfried, Moritz Gottlieb Saphir, Carl von Ghega, Wilhelm von Tegetthoff, Ferdinand Maximilian von Austria.

In 1860 he was hailed as first artist awarded the Franz Joseph Order in Austria. With the advances of photography, however, commissions fell off; Kriehuber's last years were overshadowed by poverty. He died on 30 May 1876, in his native city of Vienna. His final resting place, now an honorary grave, is in Vienna's "Zentralfriedhof" (central cemetery).

Significant collections of his works are in the Albertina (Vienna), and in the portrait collection of the Austrian National Library in Vienna. Since 1889 a street in Vienna-Margareten (Vienna's 5th district), has been named after Kriehuber.
