= Ignaz Czapka =

Austrian politician

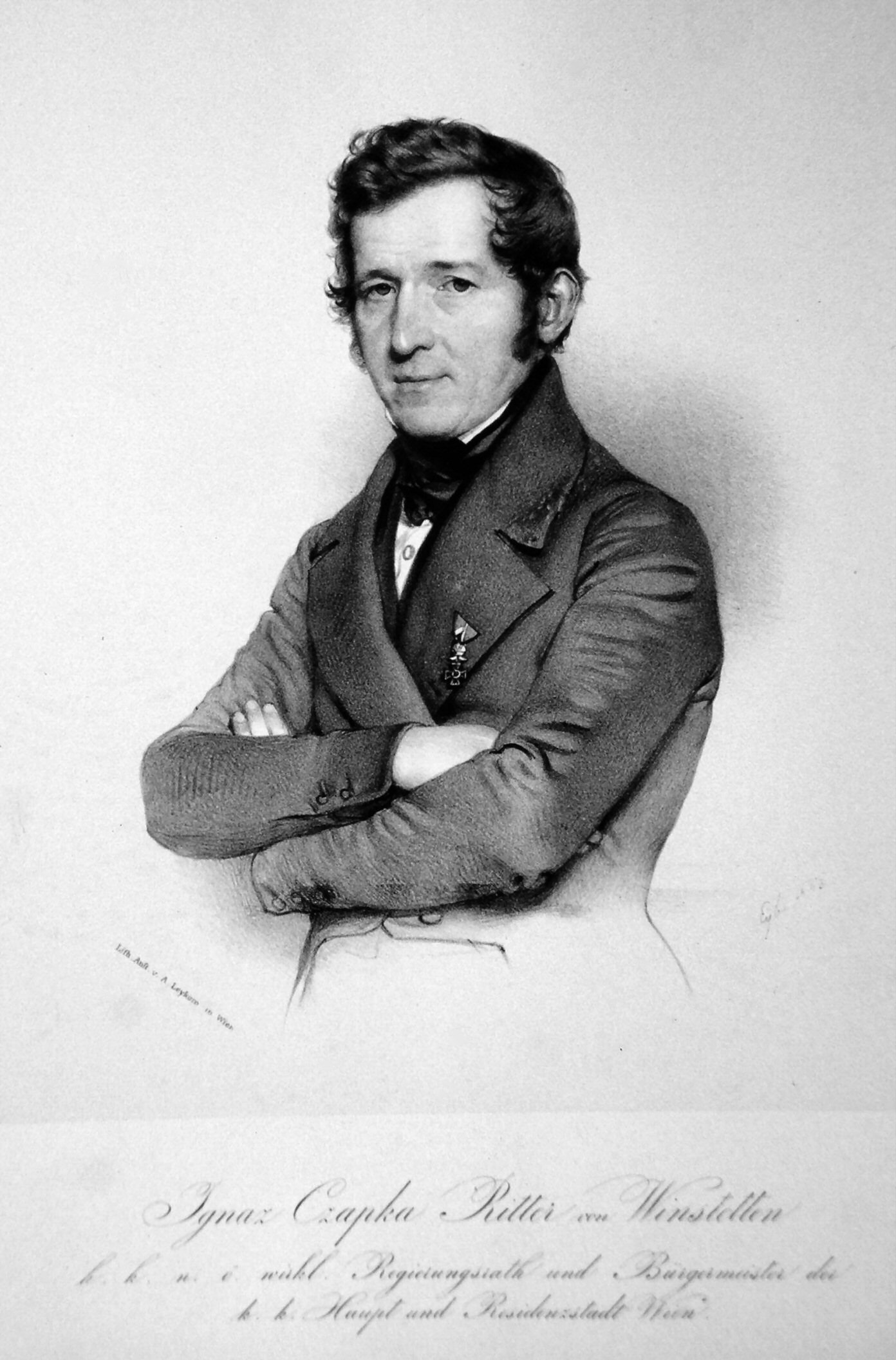

Mayor of Vienna
- In office 1838–1848
- Preceded by: Anton Joseph Leeb
- Succeeded by: Johann Kaspar von Seiller

Personal details
- Born: 24 February 1791 Liebau, Moravia
- Died: 5 June 1881 (aged 90) Vienna, Austria-Hungary

Ignaz Czapka (24 February 1791 — 5 June 1881) was a mayor of Vienna from 1838 to 1848, and later chief commissioner of the police in Vienna. As mayor, he oversaw major public works including improvements to sewers, water supply and street gas lighting.
