= Napoleon Receiving the Keys of Vienna =

Painting by Anne-Louis Girodet de Roussy-Trioson

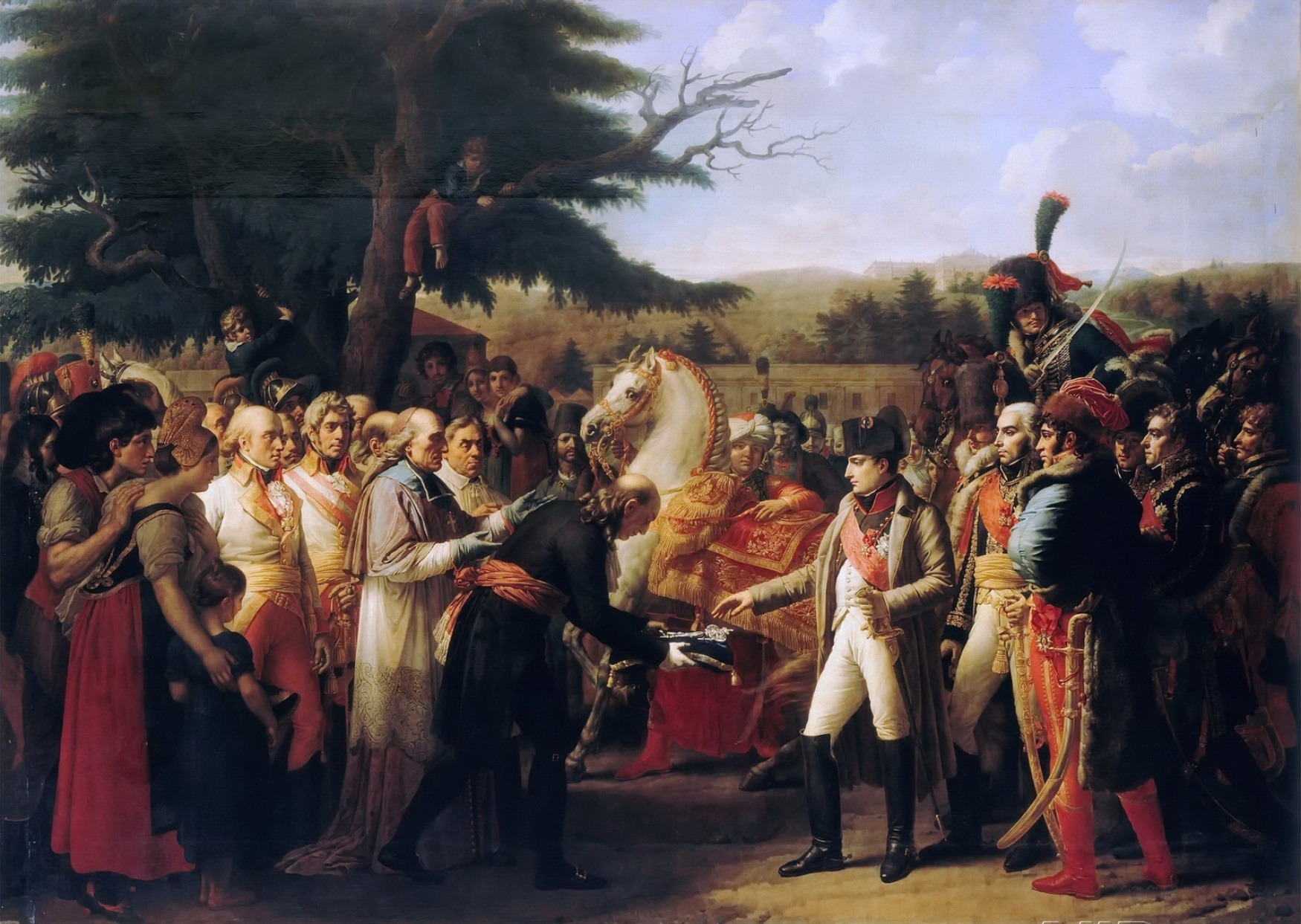
- Artist: Anne-Louis Girodet de Roussy-Trioson
- Year: 1808
- Type: Oil on canvas, history painting
- Dimensions: 380 cm × 532 cm (150 in × 209 in)
- Location: Palace of Versailles; Versailles

Napoleon Receiving the Keys of Vienna (French: Napoleon recoit les cles de la ville de Vienne) is an oil on canvas history painting by the French artist Anne-Louis Girodet de Roussy-Trioson, from 1808.

== History and description ==
It depicts a scene on the 13 November 1805 during the War of the Third Coalition when the French Emperor Napoleon was presented the keys to the city of Vienna at Schönbrunn Palace by the city's mayor Stephan von Wohlleben. Also shown in the scene are the French Marshals Jean-Baptiste Bessières, Louis-Alexandre Berthier, Joachim Murat as well as Géraud Duroc and Roustam Raza. The scene is watched also by commoners, including women and two children that are climbing at a nearby tree. A few weeks later Napoleon would win his decisive victory at the Battle of Austerlitz.

It was the first commission that Girodet received from the authorities during the Napoleonic era. It was commissioned to hang in the Tuileries Palace in Paris. It was exhibited at the Salon of 1808 at the Louvre. Today it is in the collection of the Palace of Versailles.

== Bibliography ==
- Cumming, Robert. Art. Dorling Kindersley, 2008.
- Eitner, Lorenz. An Outline Of 19th Century European Painting: From David Through Cezanne. Routledge, 2021.
- Godsey, William D. The Sinews of Habsburg Power: Lower Austria in a Fiscal-Military State 1650-1820. Oxford University Press, 2018.
- Herold, J. Christopher & Davidson, Marshall B. The Horizon Book of the Age of Napoleon. American Heritage Publishing Company, 1983.
