= Stephan Edler von Wohlleben =

Austrian politician (1751–1823)

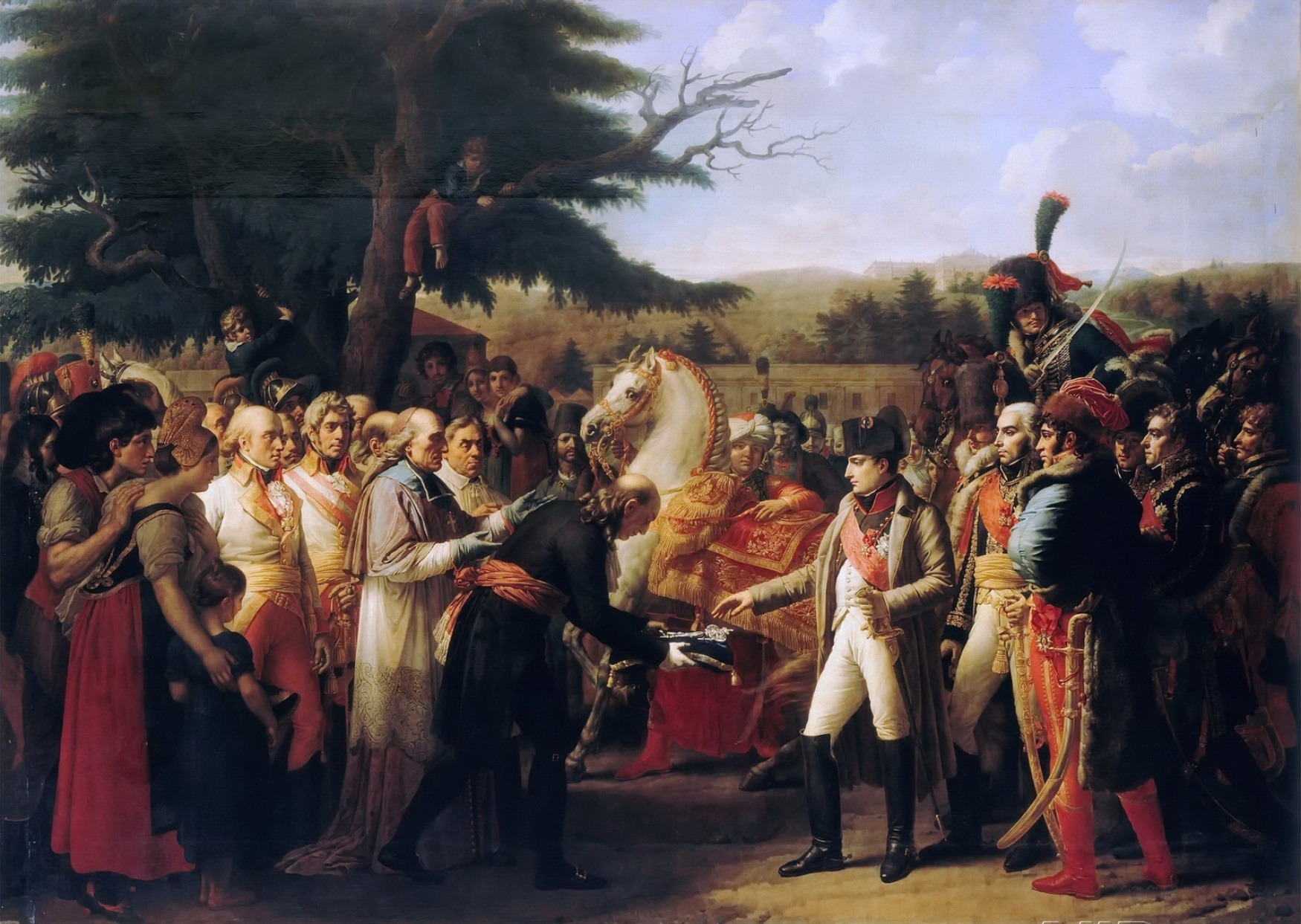
- Napoleon Receiving the Keys of Vienna by Girodet, 1808. Von Wohlleben is shown formally surrendering the city to Napoleon in November 1805.

Mayor of Vienna
- In office 1804–1823
- Preceded by: Josef Georg Hörl
- Succeeded by: Anton Joseph Edler von Leeb

Stephan Edler von Wohlleben (1751 – 30 July 1823) was a mayor of Vienna.
