= Anton Joseph Leeb =

Austrian politician (1769–1837)

Anton Joseph Edler von Leeb
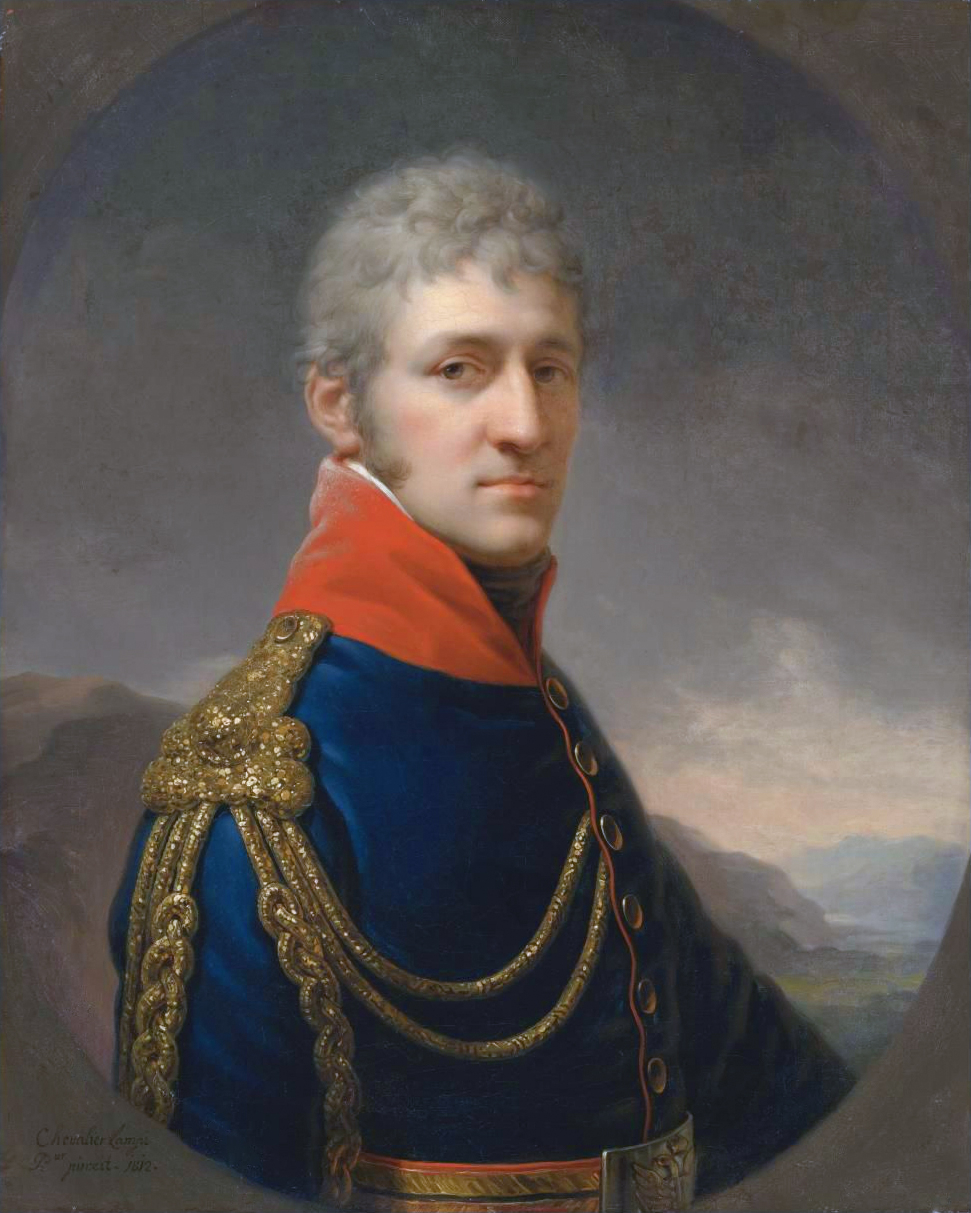

Mayor of Vienna
- In office 1835–1837
- Preceded by: Stephan Edler von Wohlleben
- Succeeded by: Ignaz Czapka

Personal details
- Born: 13 June 1769 Nikolsburg, Moravia
- Died: 6 December 1837 (aged 68) Vienna

Anton Joseph Edler von Leeb (13 June 1769 – 6 December 1837) was an Austrian politician and a mayor of Vienna from 1835 to 1837.
