= Andreas Zelinka =

Mayor of Vienna from 1861 to 1868

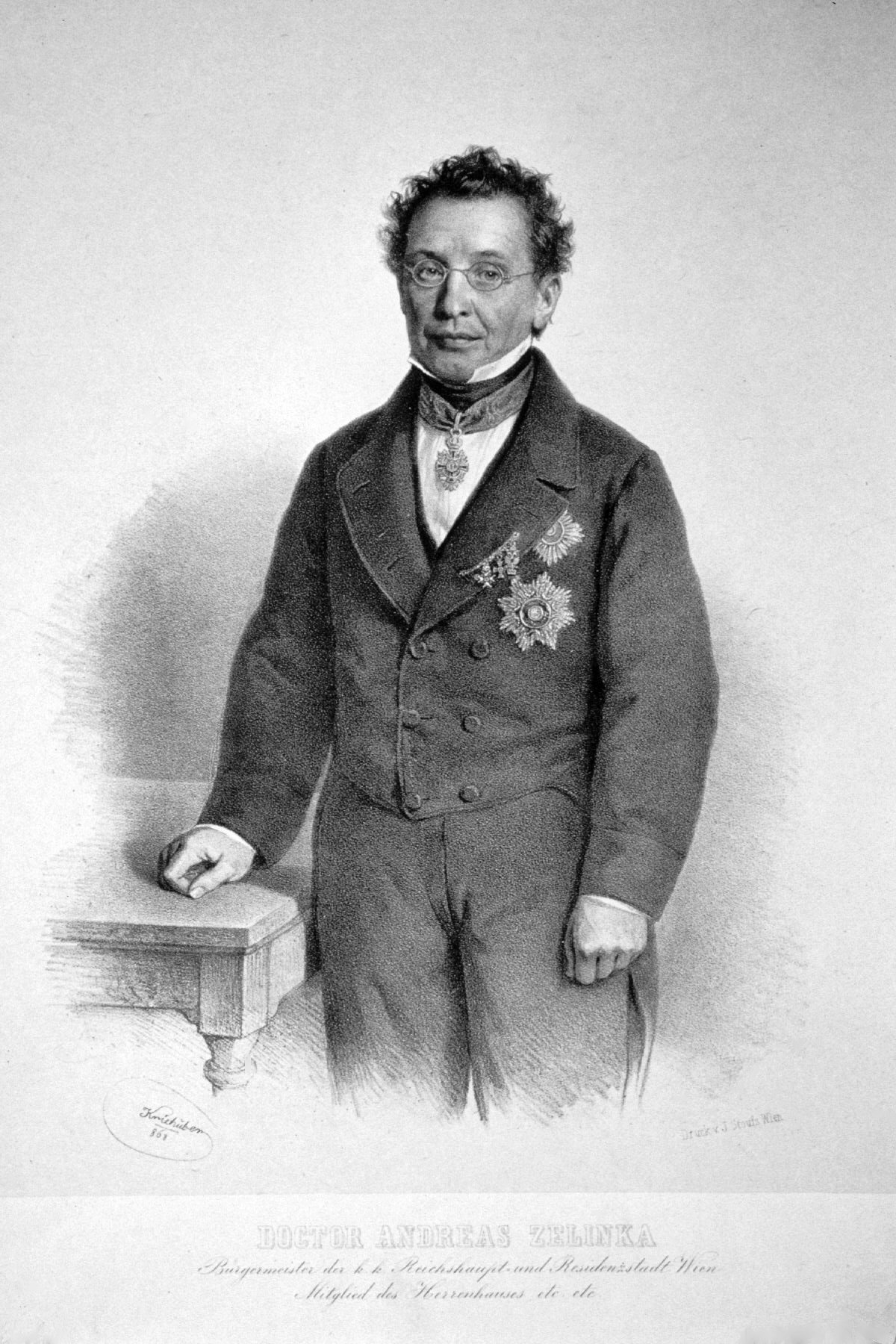
Andreas Zelinka (lithograph by Joseph Kriehuber, 1868)

Andreas Zelinka (Czech: Ondřej Zelinka; 23 February 1802 – 21 January 1868) was a Czech-Austrian politician. He served as the mayor of Vienna, Austria from 1861 to 1868.

== Life ==
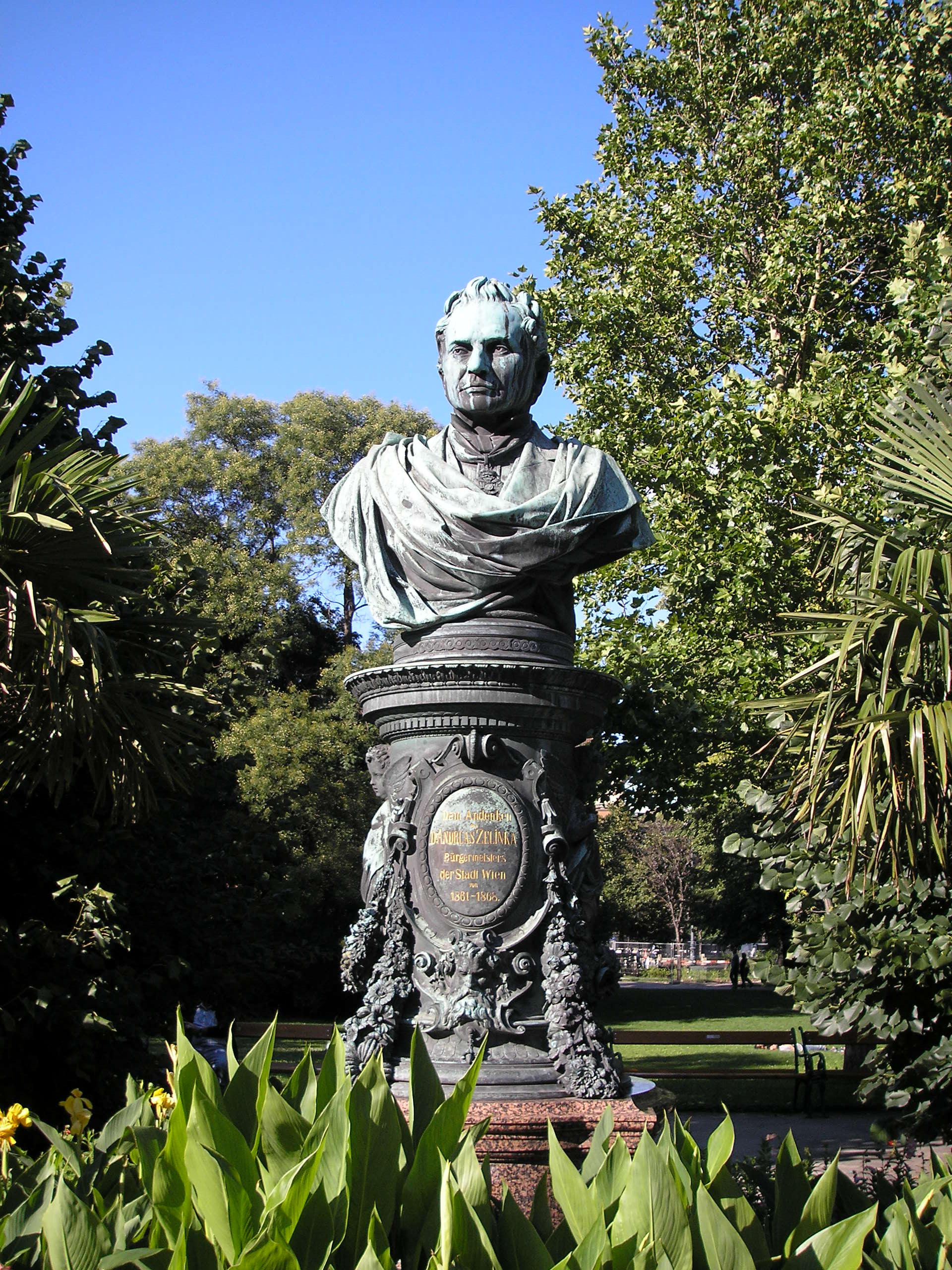
Andreas Zelinka Monument in the Stadtpark

Zelinka was born on 23 February 1802 in Vyškov, Moravia. He attended high school in Brno. From 1821 to 1825, he studied law at the University of Vienna and received his PhD in 1829. Beginning in 1831, he worked as a health inspector and an attorney. In 1848, he was elected to the Vienna City Council and became its vice-president in 1849. He was awarded the Franz Joseph Order in 1850. During his years as mayor he also served in the State Parliament of Lower Austria and, from 1867, in the Herrenhaus of the Imperial Council of Austria.

As mayor, he participated in planning the First Vienna Mountain Spring Pipeline, the Wiener Donauregulierung (a flood control project) and the Zentralfriedhof (Central Cemetery). In 1865, the first sections of the Ringstraße were opened. His entire annual salary of 12,000 florins was donated to charity. The people of Vienna called him Papa Zelinka. He died on 21 January 1868 in Vienna. In 1869, a street in the Innere Stadt was named the Zelinkagasse in his honor. He is also commemorated by a monument in the Stadtpark.

== Sources ==
- Article on Zelinka @ German Wikisource.

Government offices
Preceded by Johann Kaspar Freiherr von Seiller	Mayor of Vienna; 1861–1868	Succeeded by Cajetan Freiherr von Felder
