= Erik Tulindberg =

Finnish composer, violinist and civil servant (1761–1814)

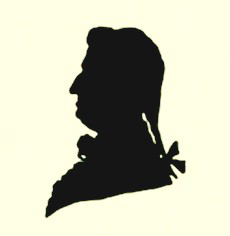
Silhouette of Eric Tulindberg by unknown artist

Erik Eriksson Tulindberg (February 22, 1761 – September 1, 1814) was one of the first known Finnish composers of classical music.

== Life ==
Tulindberg was born in Vähäkyrö in Western Finland. He studied in Turku and then worked as a civil servant in Oulu from 1784 to 1809 and thereafter in Turku. He played the violin and cello and was appointed a member of the Royal Swedish Academy of Music in 1797. He died in Turku at the age of 53.

== Music ==
From his compositions only a violin concerto in B-flat major, six string quartets, and a polonaise with five variations for solo violin remain. He wrote the violin concerto before 1784 during his youth in Turku. The work shows "simplicity and occasional clumsiness" and the influences of Mozart, Haydn and the Mannheim School of music.

His string quartets are more mature works and are better known today than the violin concerto. The string quartets are in the tradition of Haydn. A copy of Haydn's string quartets was found among Tulindberg's possessions after his death.

== Perspective ==
Tulindberg was a contemporary of Mozart and, like Mozart, he was part of the Classical era in music. His importance stems largely from his pioneering position in the music of Finland. No Finnish composer is known from the Renaissance or Baroque eras. The compositions of Tulindberg were not rediscovered until 100 years after his death.
