= Chiesa del Purgatorio, Venafro =

Roman Catholic church in Molise, Italy

Coordinates: 41°29′10″N 14°02′46″E

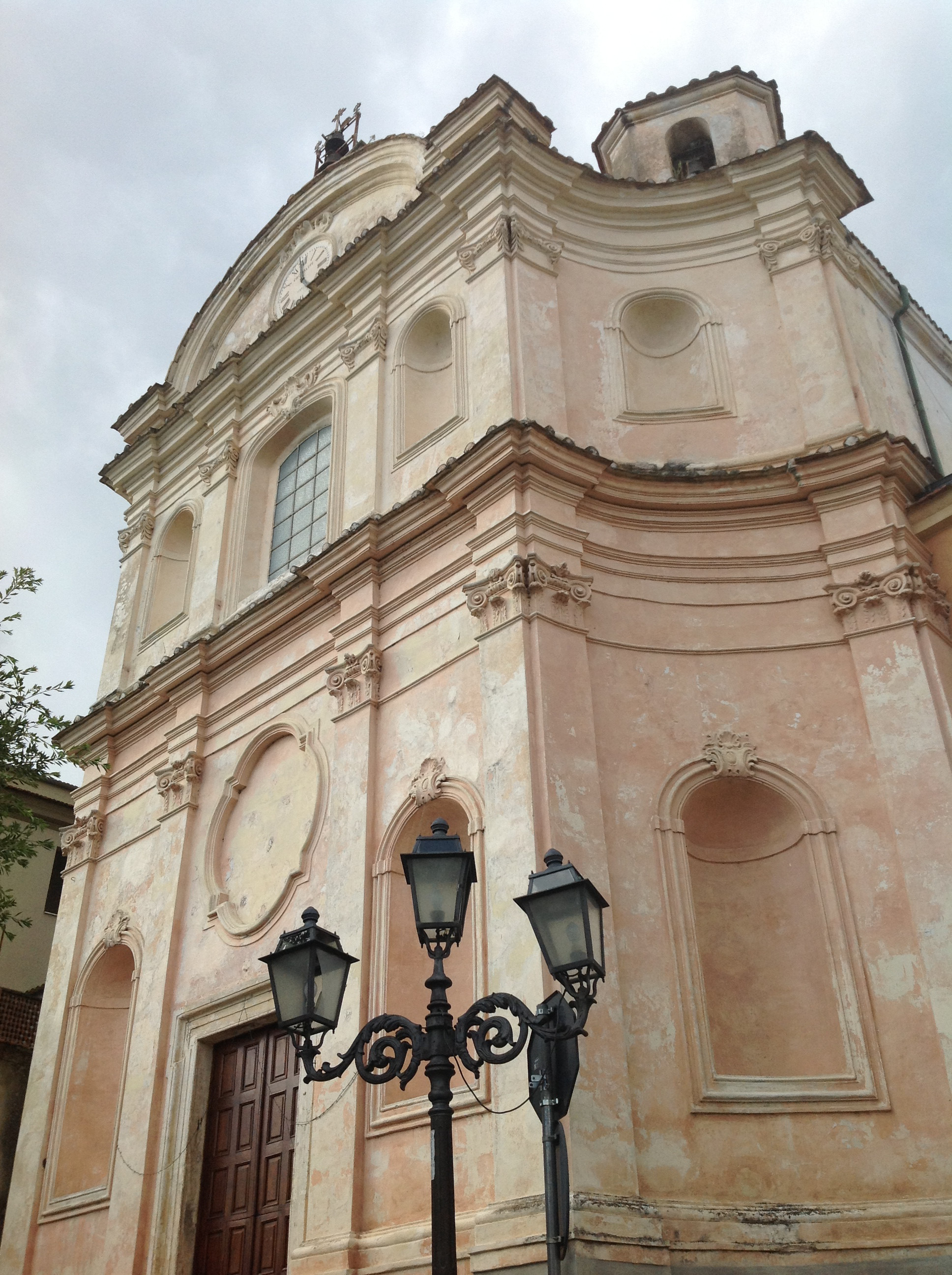

The Chiesa del Purgatorio (Church of the Purgatory) is a Baroque-style, Roman Catholic church in the town of Venafro, province of Isernia, region of Molise, Italy.

== History ==
The church was built in 1722 outside the gate for the marketplace, such that merchants and buyers could pray without having to enter the city. The tall facade has three orders. The layout is that of a Greek cross and has a clock on the facade. In 1984, after the earthquake, it was closed to worship and only re-opened in 1994.
