= Herman Scholliner =

German Benedictine theologian and historian

Herman Scholliner (15 January 1722 in Freising, Upper Bavaria – 16 July 1795) was a German Benedictine theologian and historian.

== Biography ==
He entered the Benedictine abbey of Oberaltaich in 1738; studied philosophy and theology at Erfurt and Salzburg. He was director of the house of studies of the Bavarian Benedictines from 1752 to 1757; professor of dogmatic theology at Salzburg from 1759 to 1766. He traveled to Vienna in the interests of his monastery in 1770 and became prior of his monastery in 1772. He taught dogmatic theology at Ingolstadt from 1776 to 1780 and became provost at Welchenberg in 1780. From 1759 he was a member of the Bavarian Academy of Sciences and Humanities.

He died at Welchenberg in 1795.

== Works ==
He is the author of about fifty theological and historical treatises.

As member of the Bavarian Academy he wrote Monumenta Niederaltacensia and Monumenta Oberaltacensia Elisabethcellensia et Osterhofensia, which form volumes XI (1-340) and XII of Monumenta Boica.

Other works of his include:

- De magistratuum ecclesiasticorun origine et creatione(Stadtamhof, 1757)
- De disciplinae arcani antiquitate et usu (Tegernsee, 1755)
- Ecclesiae orientalis et occidentalis concordia in transsubstantiatione (Ratisbon, 1756)
- De hierarchia ecclesiae catholicae (Ratisbon, 1757)
- Historia theologiae christianae saeculi primi (Salzburg, 1761)
- Praelectiones theologicae ad usum studii communis congregationis Benedictino-Bavaricae in XII tomos divisae (Augsburg, 1769)
- numerous contributions to the Abhandlungen der bayr. Akademie der Wissenschaften.
