= Traité de l'harmonie réduite à ses principes naturels =

Musical theory treatise by Jean-Philippe Rameau

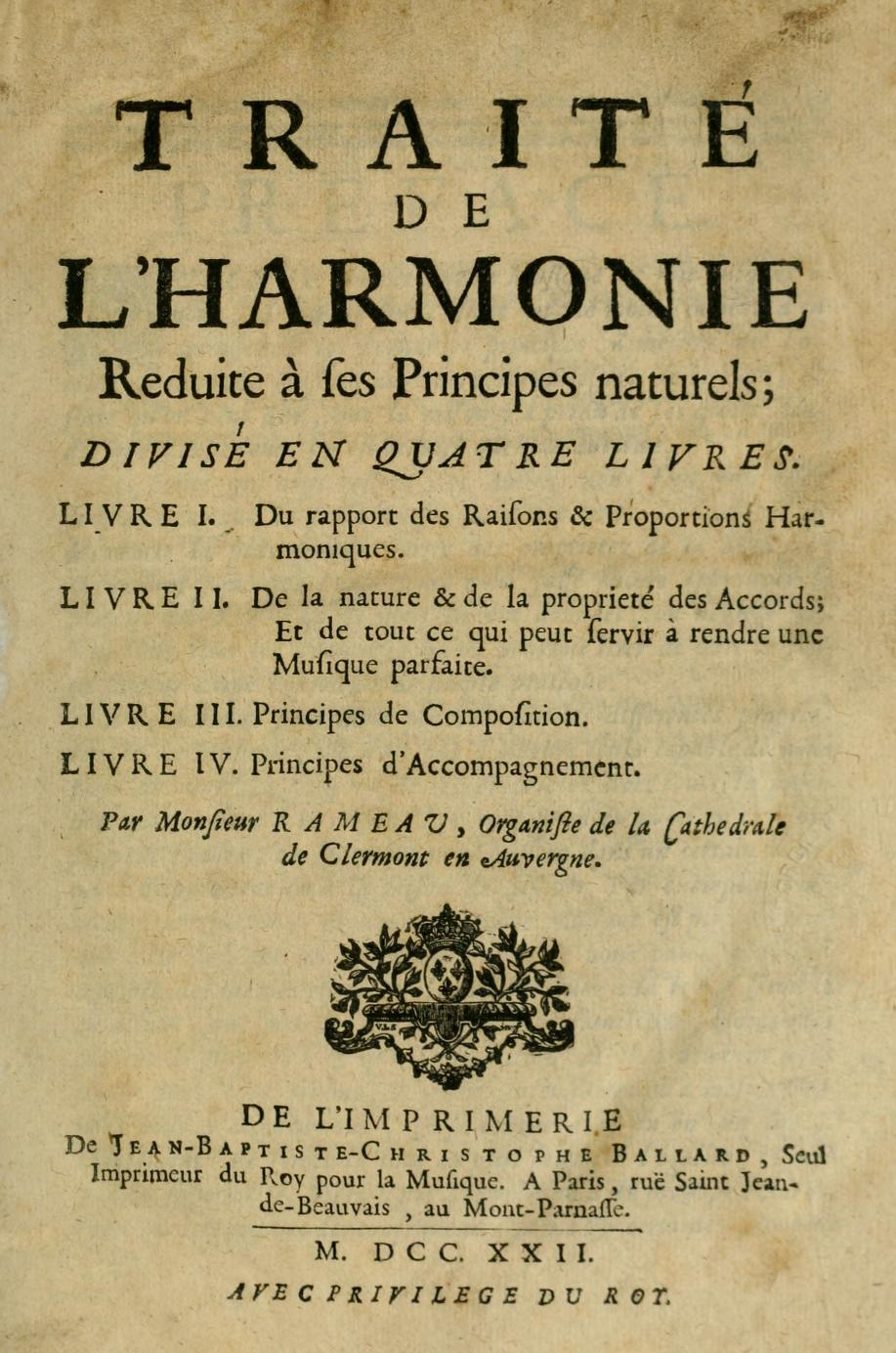
Traité de l'harmonie

Traité de l'harmonie réduite à ses principes naturels (Treatise on Harmony Reduced to Its Natural Principles) is a music treatise written by Jean-Philippe Rameau. It was first published in Paris in 1722 by Jean-Baptiste-Christophe Ballard. It is Rameau's first treatise on musical theory. A fundamental work in the development of Western music, it earned Rameau a reputation as the most learned musician of his time.

The Treatise summarizes the efforts of its author to make music a science, when before him it was considered an art. Rameau takes up the work of his predecessors, notably Gioseffo Zarlino (various theoretical works published 1549 to 1567) and René Descartes (Compendium musicae, written 1618, published posthumously, 1650), to bring order to the scattered notions identified before him and make harmony a deductive science like mathematics, on the postulate that “sound is to sound as string is to string” (referring to the mathematical relation between pitch and length). For Rameau, “nature” is the basis of his theory, which allows him to affirm that harmony is the quintessence of music, melody only proceeding from harmony.

== Contents ==
The Treatise describes music and how to write it based on the tonal system used in classical music. It uses the modern major and minor keys to teach readers what to do to achieve good-sounding music based on the 12 tone music scale.

It states the principle of the equivalence of octaves, the notions of the fundamental bass and the inversion of chords, the pre-eminence of the major triad and, at the cost of an intellectual contortion (one of the weaknesses of the theory), that of the minor perfect chord. It thus lays the foundations of classical harmony and tonality in a way that is no longer empirical.

The Treatise is divided into four books:

- Book I: On the relationship between Harmonic Ratios and Proportions.
- Book II: On the Nature and Properties of Chords; and on Everything which may be used to make music perfect.
- Book III: Principles of Composition.
- Book IV: Principles of Accompaniment.

At the time of writing his treatise, Rameau was not yet aware of Joseph Sauveur's work on harmonic sounds. A few years later, he saw that striking confirmation of his theory, which gave rise to the publication of a complementary treatise, Harmonic Generation.

== See also ==
- New System of Musical Theory (by Rameau)
- Extensive article in French Wikipedia
