= Jakob Friedrich Kleinknecht =

German composer, flutist, and Kapellmeister

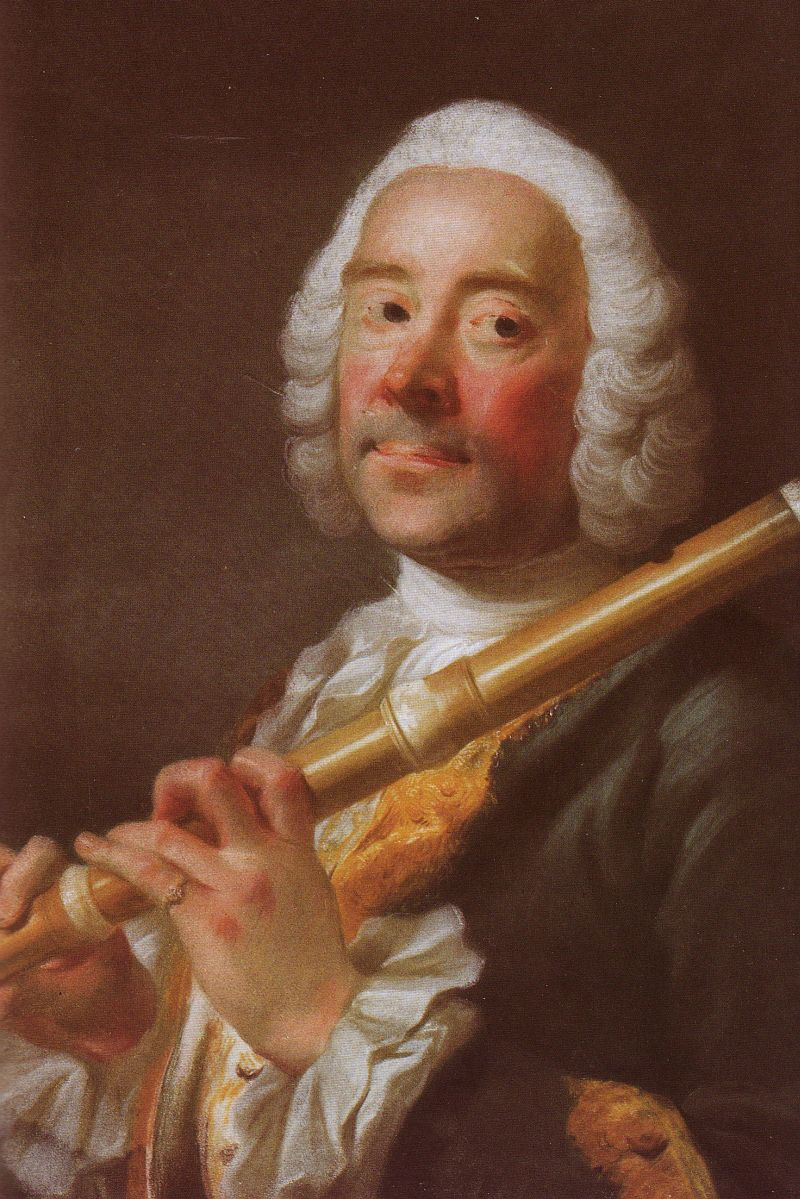
- Born: 8 April 1722 in Ulm - 11 August 1794 in Ansbach

Jakob Friedrich Kleinknecht (8 April 1722 in Ulm - 11 August 1794 in Ansbach) was a German composer, flutist, and Kapellmeister. Born to a musical family, he composed many works of chamber music and symphonies. From 1743 to 1769, he served at the court of Bayreuth. His son, Christian Ludwig Kleinknecht (1765-1794), was also a musician and a composer.
