= Schoonenberg =

Dutch trading ship

The Schoonenberg, also spelled Schonenberg and Schonenbergh, was a trading ship operated by the VOC between 1717 and 1722. The ship, a Spiegelretourschip or Dutch East Indiaman, was damaged beyond repair in an accident at Struisbaai, South Africa on 20 November 1722, during a return voyage to the Netherlands from Batavia, and was later burned and destroyed. This happened on the second of two calamitous voyages; on the maiden sailing in 1720, 75 of the crew died when the ship ran out of water and food on the leg from Cape Town to Ceylon, before finally reaching the diversion port of Mocha after spending 6 months stranded in present-day Somalia.

== Construction and specifications ==
The Schoonenberg was built in 1717 for the Amsterdam chamber of the VOC, at the companies' wharf in Amsterdam, with a length of 150 Amsterdam feet (140 feet, 42 metres). Its cargo capacity was 800 tons, with capacity for 250 people on board.

== Maiden voyage and massacre, 1719-20 ==
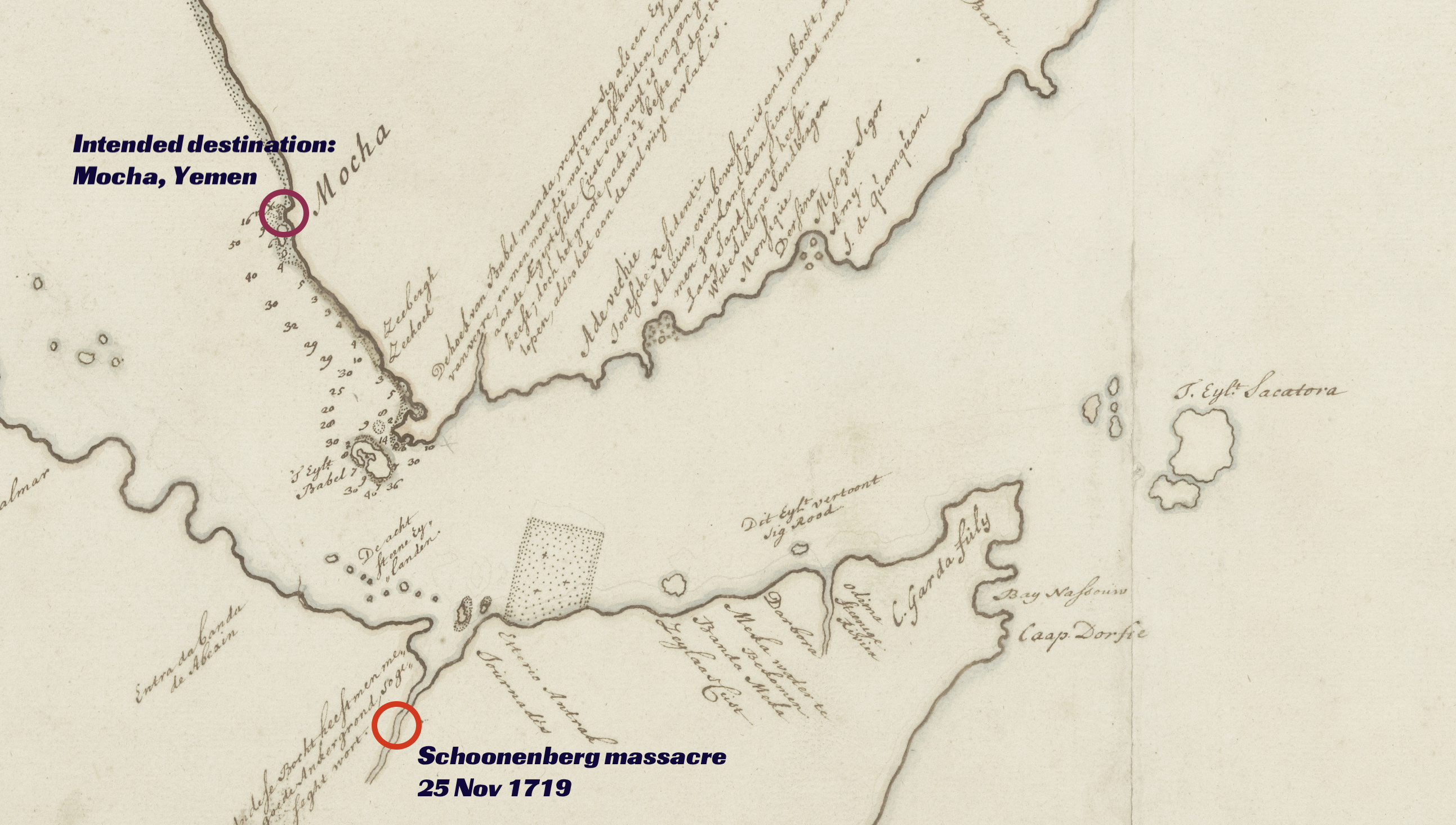
Location of the Schoonenberg Massacre, 25 Nov 1719

Under the command of Capt. Jan van der Linden, Schoonenberg left Texel on 10 February 1719 on her maiden voyage with a final destination of Ceylon. Following the routine stop at Cape Town, the ship departed on 10 August 1719 for Ceylon with 221 crew on board. However, due to strong westerly winds, the ship was unable to make progress to the east, and on 8 November, with dwindling supplies of water and food, the crew made the decision to divert to Mocha. A navigational error meant that instead of entering the area of the Red Sea beyond Bab-el-Mandeb, the ship instead sailed into a river mouth at Saylac, Ajura (present day Zeila, Somalia). The river is referred to by the crew as the "Journaldus Rivier", which is depicted on an old map of the VOC.

This mistake compounded their problems, because in addition to the lack of critical provisions, they faced a security problem: the hostility of the locals. On 25 November, they reached a point 8–9 miles upriver, and despite opposition from the third helmsman, Pieter Bellaard, the captain ordered that they launch their small boat and go on shore to negotiate for supplies. The attempt at bargaining ended in massacre: all but one of the 16 that went onshore were killed almost instantly by the locals, including van der Linden, the captain.

Following the horrific murder of their compatriots, and with scores already dead from malnutrition, hunger, and thirst, the remaining crew were in a very difficult position, too weak to sail the ship elsewhere for help, and despondent to their fate. Thanks to a chance encounter on 28 November with a small local VOC ship, they were able to communicate their plight to the company post at Mocha. However, with limited resources, all the company could do was send occasional supplies to aid them, and the Schoonenberg remained where it was. On 8 December 1719, the crew tried to make sail for Mocha, but strong currents and a general air of despondency prevented any progress. No further attempts to sail were made until 25 March 1720, but again, they could not muster the strength to depart.

A final attempt in June 1720 finally succeeded, and the Schoonenberg limped into the port of Mocha with 83 sailors, 59 soldiers, four passengers, and a total of 75 dead. In total, they had spent six months at the mouth of the river. The Schoonenberg finally reached Ceylon on 16 September 1720, and departed back to the Netherlands on 22 November, reaching Texel on 21 August 1721.

== Second voyage and shipwreck, 1722 ==
The second voyage of Schoonenberg started on 15 December 1721, under the command of Captain Albertus van Soest. Sailing for the chamber of Amsterdam, this second and final voyage for the ship would end in its demise.

Before dawn on 20 November 1722, the Schoonenberg, on its return journey from Batavia to the Netherlands, foundered on a reef at Struisbaai, South Africa (near Cape Agulhas). The events surrounding the shipwreck became the subject of legend and fable in the centuries that followed. Work by the author Jan Malan, detailed in his book Die stranding van die VOC-skip Schoonenberg: Struisbaai 1722, has separated fact from fiction, and presents a clear account of what actually happened.

== The fable ==
The earliest known version, written by Oliver Jenkins, appeared in the Cape Times of 23 December 1939 under the title "The Vanished Treasure of Vergelegen."

According to this, the skipper and three farmers had conspired to deliberately run the ship aground. The treasure from the vessel was taken to the farm Vergelegen in the Hottentots Holland, where one of the farmers and four slaves buried it in the octagonal garden behind the homestead. Three of the slaves were later found murdered, and the other absconded. The farmer also died mysteriously when the conspirators went to dig up the treasure, so that nobody knew where it had been hidden. The governor rounded up the remaining conspirators and submitted them to trial. The skipper was broken on the wheel, strangled and hanged, and the two remaining farmers were sent in chains to Batavia. Jenkins gave no sources for his story, but the use of the names of historic persons may be an indication of the creative use of snippets from the archives. Murder in the vineyards of Vergelegen, and a hidden treasure, had been part of an old oral tradition in the Hottentots Holland.

The story by Jenkins was repeated with minor changes by the well-known authors Eric Rosenthal (1951) and Lawrence Green (1958). Neither mentions any specific sources, but each alleges that his story is based on old documents. As a result, this clever fiction has subsequently been accepted generally as a credible legend.

== The true Schoonenberg story ==
Exceptionally comprehensive documentation regarding this event has been preserved in the Cape archives: the relevant Resolutions of the Political Council and correspondence between the Cape Governor and the Council of XVII in the Netherlands; the Ship's Journal of the skipper; travel journals of the missions to the wreck; affidavits by the ship's officers and men; the charge-sheet (Eijsch en Conclusie) of the fiscal; the documentation of the judicial enquiry by the Council of Justice, with several rounds of arguments and counter arguments, and the final verdict. This allows the events, as they unfolded 300 years ago, to be reconstructed in detail. Nevertheless, it was a fable, deviating radically from the truth, which caused the Schoonenberg disaster to become well known.

Between 2011 and 2017 all documentation pertaining to the Schoonenberg in the Cape archives had been investigated systematically. From this emerged the real story of the ship and its crew.

The 800-ton Schoonenberg was built for the Amsterdam Chamber of the VOC as a typical 40 m three master for trade with the East. She was launched in 1717 and left on her first visit to the East in 1719, only returning to the Netherlands in 1721. Albertus van Soest was the skipper for the second voyage which departed from Texel on 15 December 1721. It was also his second journey to the East as skipper. Stop-overs at the Cape usually lasted from three to six weeks, and Van Soest became friends with Jacob van der Heijde who supplied meat to passing ships. On 21 July 1722 the Schoonenberg arrived at Batavia.

=== The disastrous journey ===
In the company of another East-Indiaman, the Anna Maria, the Schoonenberg sailed from Batavia on 25 September 1722. Her 700-ton cargo consisted of sugar, tea, coffee, pepper and sapan wood to the value of 294,411 guilder. There were 110 men aboard, and the ship carried 28 cannons. The two vessels lost contact shortly before the Schoonenberg saw the coast of Africa just to the north of Algoa Bay on the morning of 16 November. During the following days she sailed south-west and then due west. At midday on 19 November her latitude was measured as 34 degrees 54 minutes south, that is about 8 km further south than Cape Agulhas, the most southern promontory of the continent. The skipper ordered a due westerly course to be maintained.

According to the officers, at sunset land was visible northwest of west, about 60 km off. Due west it was too hazy to see anything. It was a standing order of the Company that depth soundings had to be taken when land was being approached. The officers asked the skipper whether this should not be done. His reply, later confirmed by the men who stood at the helm, was that they knew where they were—on the sand (that is on the Agulhas Bank)—and that a depth sounding would unnecessarily retard their journey. It would be duly done the next morning. Before a stiff east-northeasterly breeze the ship journeyed on with all sails set.

Second mate Pieter Corver was on duty during the ‘dog watch’, that is from 24h00 till 04h00 the next morning. His brief was to alert the skipper and to steer away from the coast, should land be detected. Steering the ship due west was Bruno Seekamp. Around 03h30 the lookout, Pieter Janszoon, called out that there was land ahead. Corver acknowledged the call, but took no action. When the lookout called again, Corver went to alert the skipper, who had heard the second call and was already on his way to the deck. He immediately shouted for the rudder and sails to be adjusted so that they could move away from the land. The water depth was 12.5 m, but was decreasing rapidly. When the vessel responded sluggishly the daily anchor (bower anchor) was cast out, but the cable snapped when a brake was applied to slow down the ship. The dredge anchor, tied to the foremast, was then cast out. This caused the bow to veer to the north, but when its cable had run out, it also snapped. The depth was now only 7.5 m. The ship drifted sideways towards the reef, and the waves pushed it firmly on to the rocks with its bow facing the land, some 800 m off.

Water started rushing in, and after an hour or two the pumps could no longer cope. Many of the sailors were drunk as the liquor store had been looted. Some of the men went ashore on the ship's boat. The others made rafts, and so all reached land safely. The skipper and some of his officers stayed on board throughout the day and following night, while the violence of the waves caused the hull to crack in the middle, with the masts still standing. On the morning of 21 November the boat came to fetch the officers; the skipper was only taken off towards evening.

On the beach a hostile reception awaited him. According to him the officers had led the men to believe that he was responsible for the disaster which befell them. During the night he was manhandled and robbed in his tent by a bunch of ruffians.

The provisions they had brought from the ship were skimpy: 150 I of water, two barrels of barley and three live pigs. The next morning the skipper was informed by the officers that they had decided to walk to the cape. About 84 men followed them, while some 20 stayed with the skipper. These men were completely unruly and went to the wreck at will to plunder and to fetch more liquor. Van Soest and his bookkeeper, Paulus Augier, had to carry pistols to protect them from the mutineers. It was only on 26 December that all of them left for the cape with the second fact-finding mission.

According to all evidence there was never any hint of the deliberate stranding of the ship: negligence, yes, especially with the choice of a route dangerously close to the treacherous coast, and with the failure to take depth soundings. However, the reason for the large departure from their planned course remains a mystery. Possible navigational errors cannot explain the full deviation of 12 km to the north. The well-known reverse eddies to the north, of the Agulhas current as it hits the Agulhas Bank, might well have played a role. On the bank such side currents often reach more than 4 km per hour. Especially at night, the seamen could not have known that they were drifting off to the north, while steering west.

=== Action by the governor and political council ===
On the afternoon of 24 November the Anna Maria sailed into Table Bay with the news that the Schoonenberg was stranded on the rocks near Cape Agulhas. Governor Mauritz de Chavonnes immediately sent someone to investigate. When he learnt that men from the ship were on their way to the cape, he sent a delegation led by the deputy governor, Jan de la Fontaine, to Hottentots Holland to meet them at Vergelegen, the farm of Jacob van der Heijde. According to the officers, the ship and her cargo could not be salvaged and the men on the beach had little water and food. On the request of the officials, Jacob (Jacques) Malan, the farmer of the neighboring Morgenster, together with Gerrit Romond set out for the wreck. They left on 30 November with Malan's wagon loaded with emergency provisions. Two days later, two senior officials, Cornelis Valk and Johannes Pleunes, also left for Struis Bay on a fact-finding mission. Both wagons reached the stranded men on 6 December.

Meanwhile, the 84 men and their officers were cared for and entertained by Philip Morkel on his farm Onverwacht in the Hottentots-Holland. After their return to the Netherlands they expressed their gratitude by sending a tribute in the form of an epic poem called "Liefdekrans" to the Morkels.

Finally, on 25 December, the second fact-finding mission confirmed in writing on the deck of the Schoonenberg that nothing could be salvaged. Van Soest and Augier were later sent by the political council to burn the wreck so that it would not mislead passing ships. This was accomplished on 26 January 1723.

In the course of 1723 some of the Schoonenberg sailors were placed on passing ships which had lost seamen. Those remaining, together with the officers, were repatriated to the Netherlands early in 1724.

=== Judicial enquiry and verdict ===
Fiscal Cornelis van Beaumont took affidavits from all those involved and in March 1723 formulated his charge-sheet. The skipper and his officers were charged with negligence for not taking depth soundings. The lawsuit before the Council of Justice, with a number of rounds of arguments and counter-arguments, continued till 11 September when judgment was passed. All four were found guilty. Van Soest and Corver were dismissed with loss of salary and rank, and were declared unfit to serve the Company again in any capacity. Their possessions and any salary owed to them were confiscated. First mate Willem Verbeek was dismissed with loss of salary and rank, and third mate Dirk Pest was reprimanded by the Council but retained his rank.

Following the loss of his rank, Van Soest did not want to travel as an ordinary passenger on a VOC ship. Assisted by his friend Jacob van der Heijde, he secretly boarded an English vessel, the Berrington, and sailed for Europe at the end of 1723.

=== Suspicion of looting from the wreck ===
The Council of XVII in the Netherlands were dissatisfied with the long-drawn-out legal process, and even more so with the lenient sentence of Van Soest, whom they suspected of having beached the ship deliberately. After his return to his fatherland as a free man, they resolved to charge him for the robbery of goods which he was supposed to bring from the East for people in Holland, and which he now alleged had been lost in the disaster.

The investigation of fiscal Adriaan van Kervel in 1726 on order of the Council of XVII did find evidence that a sealed package containing a hoard had been sent by Van Soest to Van der Heijde, and that locked cases and rolls of eastern materials had been offloaded at Vergelegen. But Van der Heijde and his family denied having seen this. No material evidence could be found and there was no indication that anything had later been transported from Vergelegen.

Replying to Van Kervel's report, the Council of XVII wrote that they would give the matter more thought. No documents were found indicating that anybody had ever been charged for looting.

== Discovery of the wreck ==
On 25 November 1985 Charlie Shapiro and Mike Keulemans found indications of a wreck while conducting a magnetometer survey on Northumberland reef at Struis Bay. A systematic survey of the site in 1990 by a party led by Jimmy Herbert allowed the position of four anchors (including a bent dredge anchor) and 21 cannon to be mapped, and also brought to light Eastern porcelain, pepper, Dutch ijsel bricks, molten lead and various household articles. This evidence, together with historic records regarding the orientation of the wreck and its subsequent burning, convinced the researchers that the discovered wreck was that of the Schoonenberg.
