= Dominic Schram =

German Benedictine theologian and canonist

Dominic Schram, sometimes spelled Schramm (24 October 1722 - 21 September 1797) was a German Benedictine theologian and canonist.

== Biography ==
He was born at Bamberg. He took vows at Banz near Bamberg in 1743, and after being ordained priest on 18 August 1748, taught at his monastery: at first mathematics (1757), then canon law (1760), philosophy (1762) and soon after theology. In 1782 he reluctantly accepted the position of prior in the monastery of Michelsberg at Bamberg, whence he returned to Banz in 1787, where he died ten years later.

== Writings ==
His chief works are:

- "Compendium theologiae dogmaticae, scholasticae, et moralis, methodo scientifica propositum", 3 volumes (Augsburg, 1768; 3d edition, Turin, 1837-9)
- "Institutiones theologiae mysticae", 2 volumes (Ausburg, 1774; 3d edition, Paris, 1868), his best work; Analysis operum SS. Patrum et scriptorum ecclesiasticorum", 18 volumes, reaching as far as St. Damasus (Augsburg 1780 96)
- "Institutiones juris ecclesiastici publici et privati", 3 vols. (Augsburg, 1774-5; 2d ed., 1782)
- "Epitome canonum ecclesiasticorum ex conciliis Germaniae collecta" (Augsburg, 1774)
- a newly arranged edition of the "Summa Conciliorum" of Carranza continued up to Pius VI, 4 volumes (Augsburg, 1778).
