= Claudius Franciscus Gagnières des Granges =

Claudius Franciscus Gagnières des Granges (23 May 1722 – 2 September 1792) was a French Jesuit.

Born in Chambéry, he was one of the 191 victims of the September Massacres. He was beatified by Pope Pius XI in 1926.
