= Josef Georg Hörl =

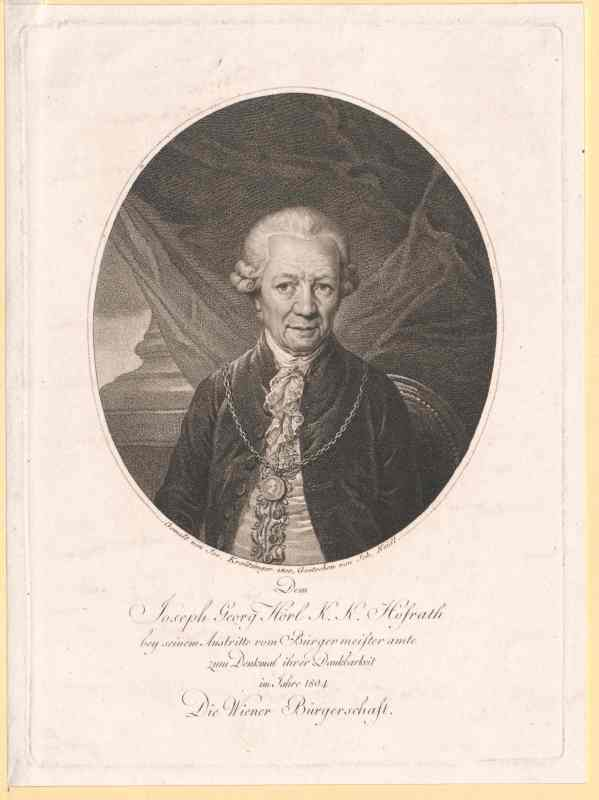

Mayor of Vienna
- In office 1773–1804
- Preceded by: Leopold Franz Gruber
- Succeeded by: Stephan Edler von Wohlleben

Personal details
- Born: 22 August 1722 Vienna
- Died: 9 December 1806 (aged 84) Vienna

Josef Georg Hörl (22 August 1722 – 9 December 1806) was an Austrian lawyer, serving as mayor of Vienna from 1773 to 1804. He is also considered to be the longest-serving mayor of Vienna. He was a supporter of Mozart during the composers ten years living in Vienna.

Hörl's tenure saw the creation of three theatres - the Theater auf der Wieden (1787), the Theater in der Josefstadt (1788), and the Theater an der Wien (1801). In September 1791 the Theater auf der Wieden saw the premiere of Wolfgang Amadeus Mozart's opera The Magic Flute. Emanuel Schikaneder's troupe moved to the Theater an der Wien when it opened in 1801, and the Theater auf der Wieden was converted into apartments.

Hörl was appointed to the position of Mayor of Vienna in 1773 by Empress Maria Theresia. In 1780 Emperor Joseph II elevated him to the rank of k.k. Rat (Imperial Advisor) and invited him to participate in his Magistratsreform, which was introduced in 1783 and remained in force until 1850. During this period the municipal administration of Vienna, the Magistrat (with 42 Magistratsräte), was divided into three independent 'Senates', with the mayor as the overall executive leader. The 'Senat in publico-politicis et oeconomicis' was responsible for the municipal administration and finances, the 'Senat in judicialibus criminalibus' oversaw criminal law and the 'Senat in judicialibus civilibus' oversaw civil law. The mayor in person chaired the first of these Senates, the other two were chaired by depute mayors. The Magistratsräte, the depute mayors and the mayor were elected for four years at a time by the Äußerer Rat, a committee of Viennese citizens, and their appointment had to be ratified by the Government. The citizens' committee, originally with 95 members, was for its part elected by the Magistratsräte.

With this reform Joseph II in effect incorporated the municipal administration into the centralised system of an absolutist state, thereby successfully preventing the citizens of Vienna from attaining political independence.

== Sources ==
- Felix Czeike: Wien und seine Bürgermeister. Sieben Jahrhunderte Wiener Stadtgeschichte. Jugend und Volk, Wien u. a. 1974, ISBN 3-8113-6078-7.
- Andreas Pittler: Die Bürgermeister Wiens: die Geschichte der Stadt in Porträts. Ueberreuter, 2003, ISBN 3-8000-3873-0.
- Ferdinand Opll and Peter Csendes (eds), Wien: Von 1790 bis zur Gegenwart, Vienna: Böhlau, 2006, pp. 89–90, ISBN 978-3-205-99268-4.
