= Johann Kaspar von Seiller =

First elected mayor of Vienna

Johann Kaspar Freiherr von Seiller
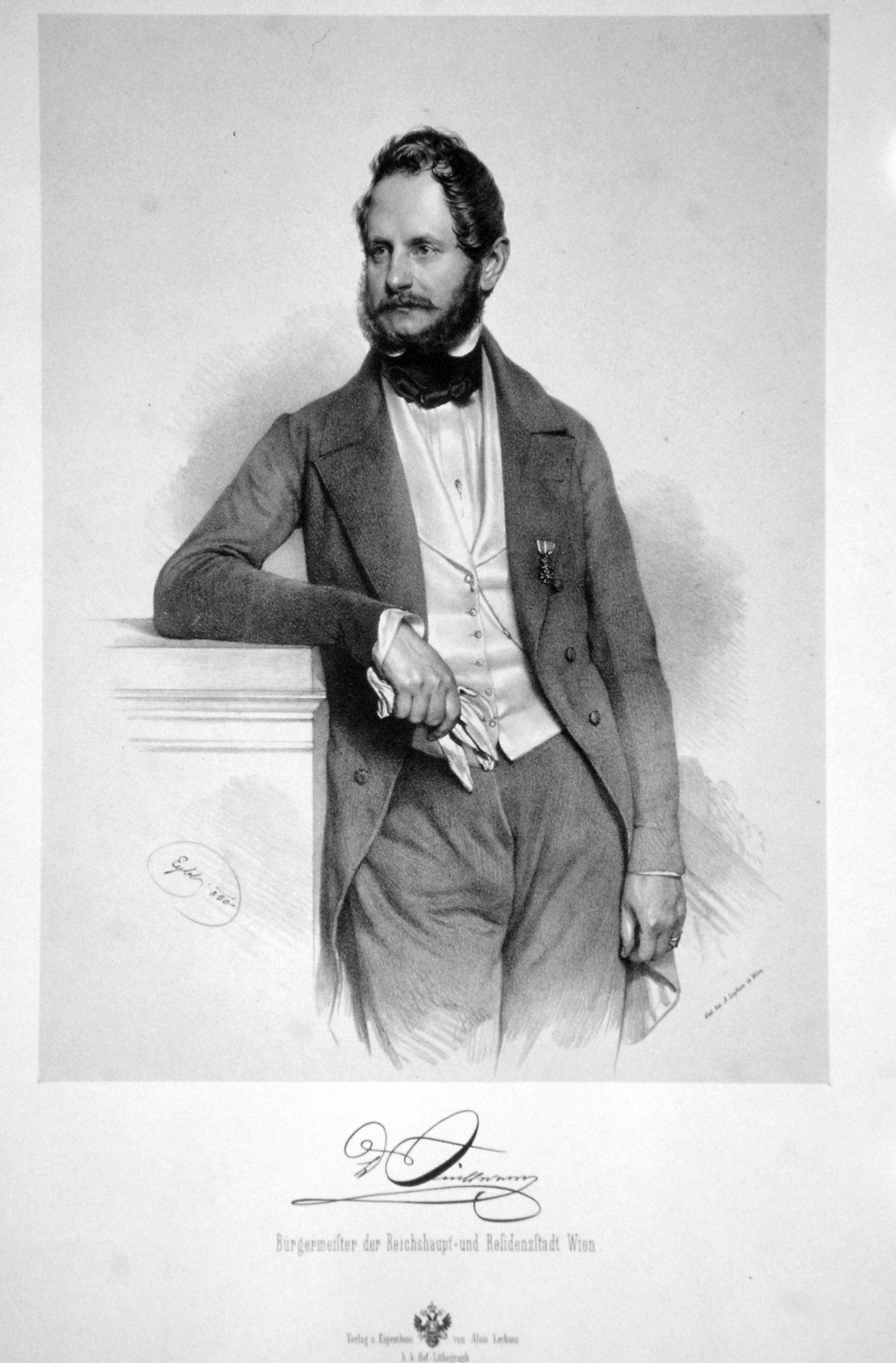

Mayor of Vienna
- In office 1851–1861
- Preceded by: Ignaz Czapka
- Succeeded by: Andreas Zelinka

Personal details
- Born: 20 October 1802 Maribor, Styria, Habsburg monarchy (present-day, Slovenia)
- Died: 10 February 1888 (aged 85) Vienna, Austria-Hungary
- Spouse: Maria Weigl
- Children: Josef von Seiller, Aloys von Seiller, Anton von Seiller, Maria Walpurga von Schwaiger, Viktor von Seiller, Maximilian von Seiller.
- Education: Doctor of Law (University of Vienna)
- Profession: Lawyer, Judge, Politician

Johann Kaspar Freiherr von Seiller (1802–1888) was the first freely elected mayor of Vienna.
