= Pietro Maria Gazzaniga =

Italian Dominican theologian

Pietro Maria Gazzaniga (3 March 1722 at Bergamo, Italy – 11 December 1799 at Vicenza) was an Italian Dominican theologian.

== Life ==
At a very early age he entered the Order of St. Dominic, and studied the various branches of ecclesiastical sciences, especially philosophy and theology. He was then, despite his youth, appointed to teach philosophy and church history, first in the various houses of his order and later at the University of Bologna.

The University of Vienna had in 1760, a vacancy for the chair of dogmatic theology, which had been assigned exclusively to members of the Dominican Order. The Empress Maria Theresa appealed to Gazzaniga's superiors to have him transferred. At his feet sat the Empress herself, Cardinal Migazzi, and Garampi; and Pope Pius VI, during his sojourn in Vienna, attended his lectures. After twenty years, he returned to Italy, where he continued to lecture in various places until his death.

== Works ==
In theology, Gazzaniga was a leading defender and exponent of the Thomistic school during the eighteenth century. By strict adherence to the traditional teaching of his school, he set himself against the spirit of his age, which sought to modernize and to conduct all theological schools of Austria on plans designed to render them more independent of ecclesiastical and royal authority. He succeeded in winning over to his cause Simon Rock, till then an associate of Gerard van Swieten, the promoter of the Jansenist spirit in Austria, and with his assistance restored Thomism in the schools. His fidelity to Aquinas likewise rendered him very bitter against Molinism; so much so, in fact, that he succeeded in persuading Gomarist Calvinists, as against the Arminians, to subscribe to the Thomistic doctrine of predestination and reprobation (ad sanam Thomistarum de predestinations et reprobatione doctrinam descenderunt, Proelect., vol. II, diss. 6, n. 242).

His principal work, the "Praelectiones theologicae habitae in vindobonensi universitate, nunc vero alio methodo dispositae, emendatae et auctae", went through many editions (9 vols., Bologna, 1788–1793; Bassani, 1831).
