= Théodore Gardelle =

Genevan artist (1722–1761)

Théodore Gardelle (30 November 1722 – 4 April 1761) was a painter and enameller.

He was born in Geneva, then in the independent Republic of Geneva, where he studied portrait miniature painting. Having acquired its first rudiments, he went to Paris in 1744. There he gained great proficiency in the art. He lived there studying and painting until 1750. Then he returned to his native place and practised his profession for some years. In 1756, he again went to Paris. In 1760, he went to England, where he was executed in Haymarket, London, for murdering his landlady Anne King.
