= 1806 in Iran =

- Decades
- See also: Other events of 1806; Years in Iran

The following lists events that happened during 1806 in Qajar era.

== Incumbents ==
- Monarch: Fath-Ali Shah Qajar

== Births ==
- January 10 – Hakob Hovnatanyan, Armenian artist.
