= 1759 =

1759 in various calendars
- Gregorian calendar: 1759; MDCCLIX
- Ab urbe condita: 2512
- Armenian calendar: 1208; ԹՎ ՌՄԸ
- Assyrian calendar: 6509
- Balinese saka calendar: 1680–1681
- Bengali calendar: 1165–1166
- Berber calendar: 2709
- British Regnal year: 32 Geo. 2 – 33 Geo. 2
- Buddhist calendar: 2303
- Burmese calendar: 1121
- Byzantine calendar: 7267–7268
- Chinese calendar: 戊寅年 (Earth Tiger); 4456 or 4249 — to — 己卯年 (Earth Rabbit); 4457 or 4250
- Coptic calendar: 1475–1476
- Discordian calendar: 2925
- Ethiopian calendar: 1751–1752
- Hebrew calendar: 5519–5520
- Hindu calendars
- Vikram Samvat: 1815–1816
- Shaka Samvat: 1680–1681
- Kali Yuga: 4859–4860
- Holocene calendar: 11759
- Igbo calendar: 759–760
- Iranian calendar: 1137–1138
- Islamic calendar: 1172–1173
- Japanese calendar: Hōreki 9 (宝暦９年)
- Javanese calendar: 1684–1685
- Julian calendar: Gregorian minus 11 days
- Korean calendar: 4092
- Minguo calendar: 153 before ROC 民前153年
- Nanakshahi calendar: 291
- Thai solar calendar: 2301–2302
- Tibetan calendar: ས་ཕོ་སྟག་ལོ་ (male Earth-Tiger); 1885 or 1504 or 732 — to — ས་མོ་ཡོས་ལོ་ (female Earth-Hare); 1886 or 1505 or 733

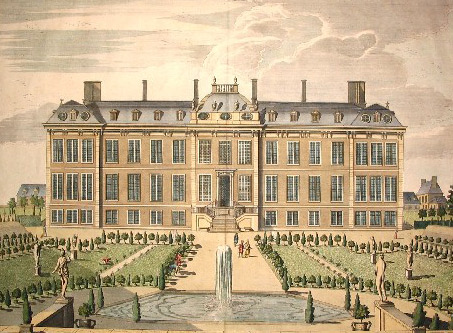
January 15:The British Museum opens in London.

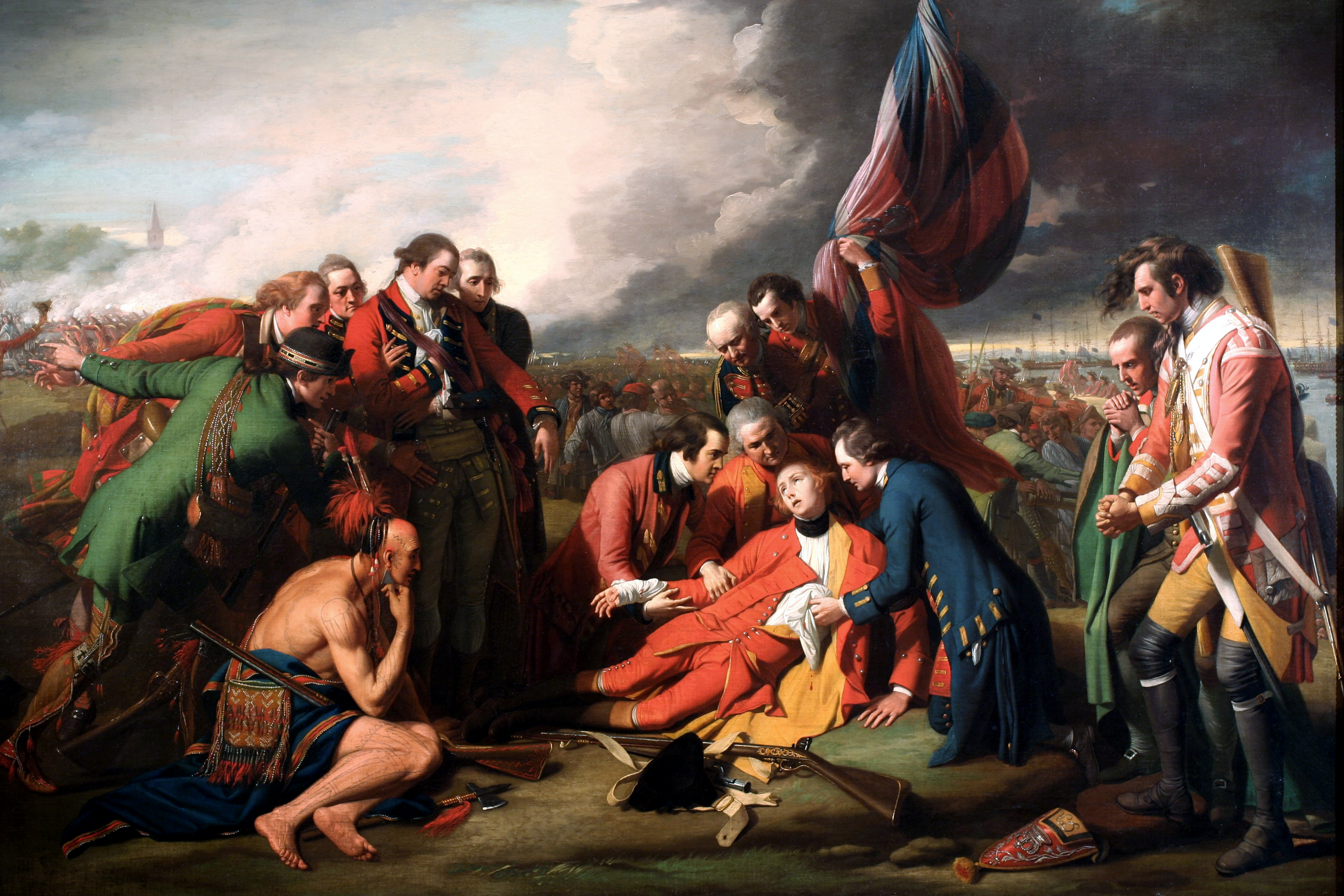
September 13: Britain defeats France in the Battle of the Plains of Abraham to capture Quebec, but the commanders of both sides (General Wolfe and the Marquis de Montcalm) are killed.

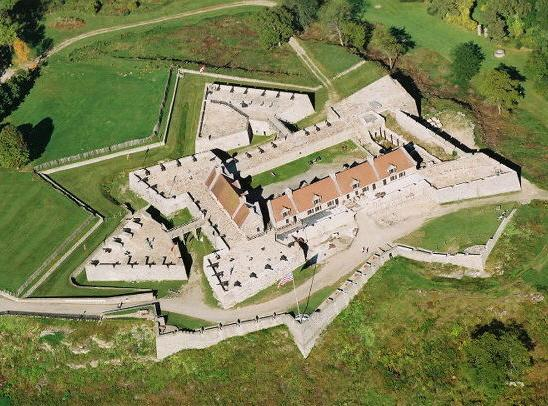
July 26/27: Fort Carillon/Fort Ticonderoga.

1759 (MDCCLIX) was a common year starting on Monday of the Gregorian calendar and a common year starting on Friday of the Julian calendar, the 1759th year of the Common Era (CE) and Anno Domini (AD) designations, the 759th year of the 2nd millennium, the 59th year of the 18th century, and the 10th and last year of the 1750s decade. As of the start of 1759, the Gregorian calendar was 11 days ahead of the Julian calendar, which remained in localized use until 1923.

In Great Britain, this year was known as the Annus Mirabilis, because of British victories in the Seven Years' War.

== Events ==
=== January–March ===
- January 6 – George Washington marries Martha Dandridge Custis.
- January 11 – In Philadelphia, the first American life insurance company is incorporated.
- January 13 – Távora affair: The Távora family is executed, following accusations of the attempted regicide of Joseph I of Portugal.
- January 15
  - The British Museum opens at Montagu House in London after six years of development.
  - Voltaire's satire Candide is published simultaneously in five countries.
- January 27 – Battle of Río Bueno: Spanish forces, led by Juan Antonio Garretón, defeat indigenous Huilliches of southern Chile.
- February 12 – Ali II ibn Hussein becomes the new Ruler of Tunisia upon the death of his brother, Muhammad I ar-Rashid. Ali reigns for 23 years until his death in 1782.
- February 16 – The Comte de Lally (Thomas Lally) ends the French Army's two-month siege of the British Indian fort at Madras and retreats.
- February 17 – "The greatest fleet that had ever put out for America" departs from Portsmouth with 250 ships (including 49 Royal Navy warships under the command of Vice Admiral Charles Saunders, on a mission to capture French-controlled Quebec. The ships bring 14,000 sailors, marines and British Army troops under the command of Major General James Wolfe, along with another 7,000 men in merchant service.
- March 4–November 20 – Étienne de Silhouette serves as Controller-General of France and attempts major financial reforms.

=== April–June ===
- April 13 – Seven Years' War – Battle of Bergen: A French army defeats Ferdinand, Duke of Brunswick in Hesse.
- May 1 – Josiah Wedgwood founds the Wedgwood pottery in England.
- May 10 – The Macedonian Hussar Regiment is formed and starts to assist the Russian Empire in the Seven Years' War.
- June 4 – After arriving at Canada, the Royal Navy fleet sails out of British-controlled Halifax toward the St. Lawrence River to prepare the invasion of French Quebec.
- June 15 – The first vascular surgery in history is performed by a Dr. Hallowell (whose first name has been lost) at Newcastle upon Tyne in England, who uses suture repair rather than a tying off with a ligature to repair an aneurysm on a patient's brachial artery. The case is reported in 1761 by Dr. Richard Lambert in the paper "A new technique of treating an aneurysm", published in the journal Medical Observations and Inquiries. The new procedure of reconstructing a damaged artery replaces the practice of ligation that had risked the amputation of a limb or organ failure.
- June 26 – After their fleet finishes navigation of the St. Lawrence and arriving at the Île d'Orléans, British troops go ashore on France's North American territory and begin the siege of Quebec City.

=== July–September ===
- July 19 – The Great Stockholm Fire 1759 breaks out at Södermalm in Stockholm, Sweden.
- July 25 – Seven Years' War (French and Indian War): In Canada, British forces capture Fort Niagara from the French, who subsequently abandon Fort Rouillé.
- July 26–27 – Seven Years' War (French and Indian War) – Battle of Ticonderoga: At the southern end of Lake Champlain, French forces withdraw from Fort Carillon, which is taken by the British under General Amherst, and renamed Fort Ticonderoga.
- August 1 – Battle of Minden: Anglo–Hanoverian forces under Ferdinand of Brunswick defeat the French army of the Duc de Broglie, but due to the disobedience of the English cavalry commander Lord George Sackville, the French are able to withdraw unmolested.
- August 10 – Ferdinand VI of Spain dies, and is succeeded by his half-brother Charles III. Charles resigns the thrones of Naples and Sicily to his third son, Ferdinand IV.

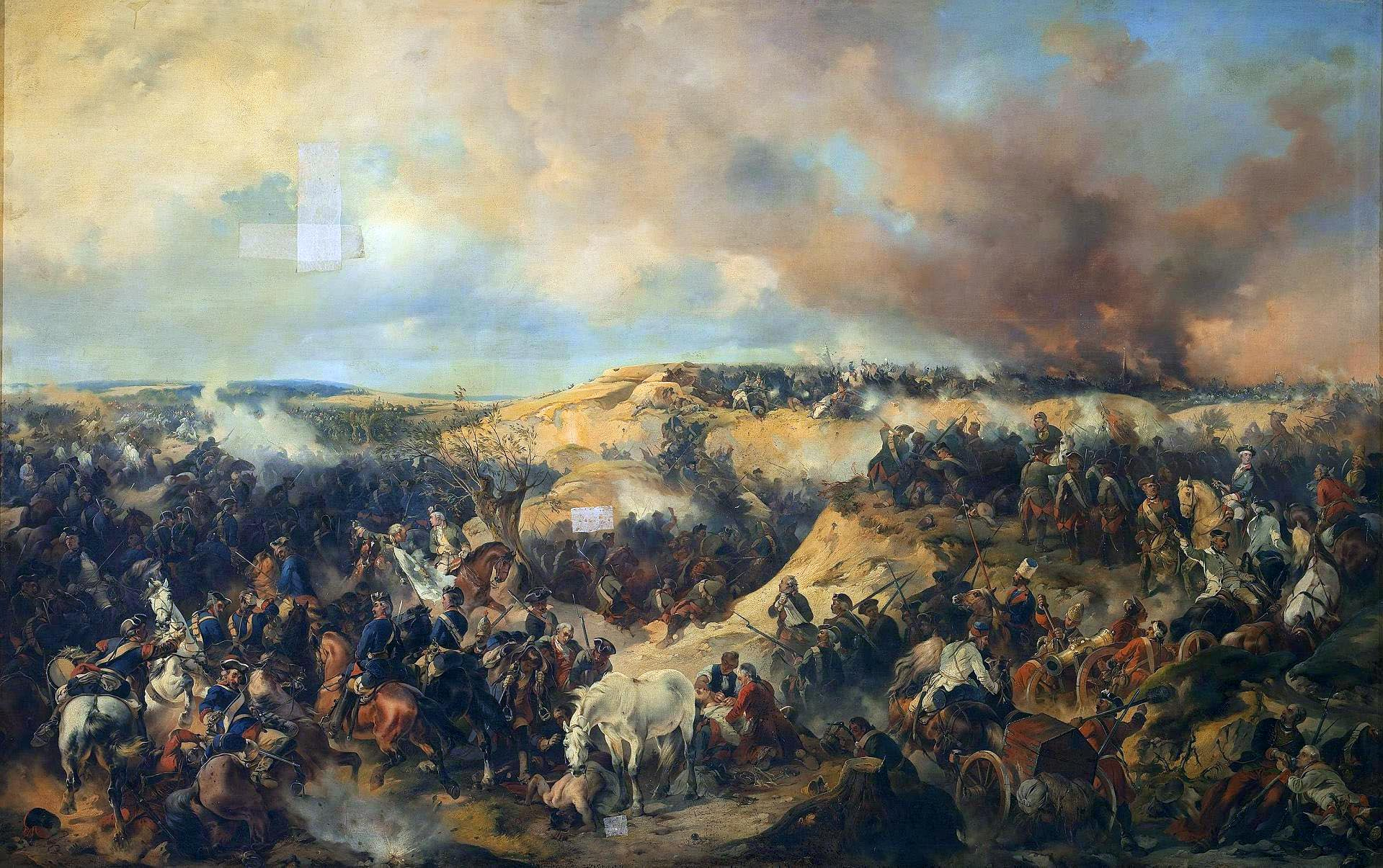
August 12: Battle of Kunersdorf.

- August 12 – Battle of Kunersdorf: Frederick the Great is rebuffed in bloody assaults, by the combined Austro–Russian army of Pyotr Saltykov and Ernst von Laudon. This is one of Frederick's greatest defeats.
- August 18 – Battle of Lagos: The British fleet of Edward Boscawen defeats a French force under Commodore Jean-François de La Clue-Sabran off the Portuguese coast.
- September 10 – Battle of Pondicherry: An inconclusive naval battle is fought off the coast of India, between the French Admiral d'Aché and the British under George Pocock. The French forces are badly damaged and sail home, never to return.
- September 13 – Seven Years' War (French and Indian War) – Battle of the Plains of Abraham: Quebec falls to British forces, following General James Wolfe's victory just outside the city. Both the French Commander (the Marquis de Montcalm) and the British General Wolfe are fatally wounded.
- September 14 – Carrington Bowles publishes A Journey Through Europe, a board game designed by John Jefferys, the earliest board game whose designer's name is known.

=== October–December ===
- October 16 – Smeaton's Tower, John Smeaton’s Eddystone Lighthouse off the coast of South West England, is first illuminated.
- October 18 – A fire destroys the Macedonian city of Salonika, reducing 4,000 houses to ashes.
- October 30 – Near East earthquakes of 1759: The first event in an earthquake doublet occurs to the north of the Sea of Galilee, with a surface wave magnitude of 6.6 and a maximum Mercalli intensity of VIII–IX (Severe–Violent). About 2,000 are killed in Safed.
- November 20 – Battle of Quiberon Bay: The British fleet of Sir Edward Hawke defeats a French fleet under Marshal de Conflans, near the coast of Brittany. This is the decisive naval engagement of the Seven Years' War – after this, the French are no longer able to field a significant fleet.

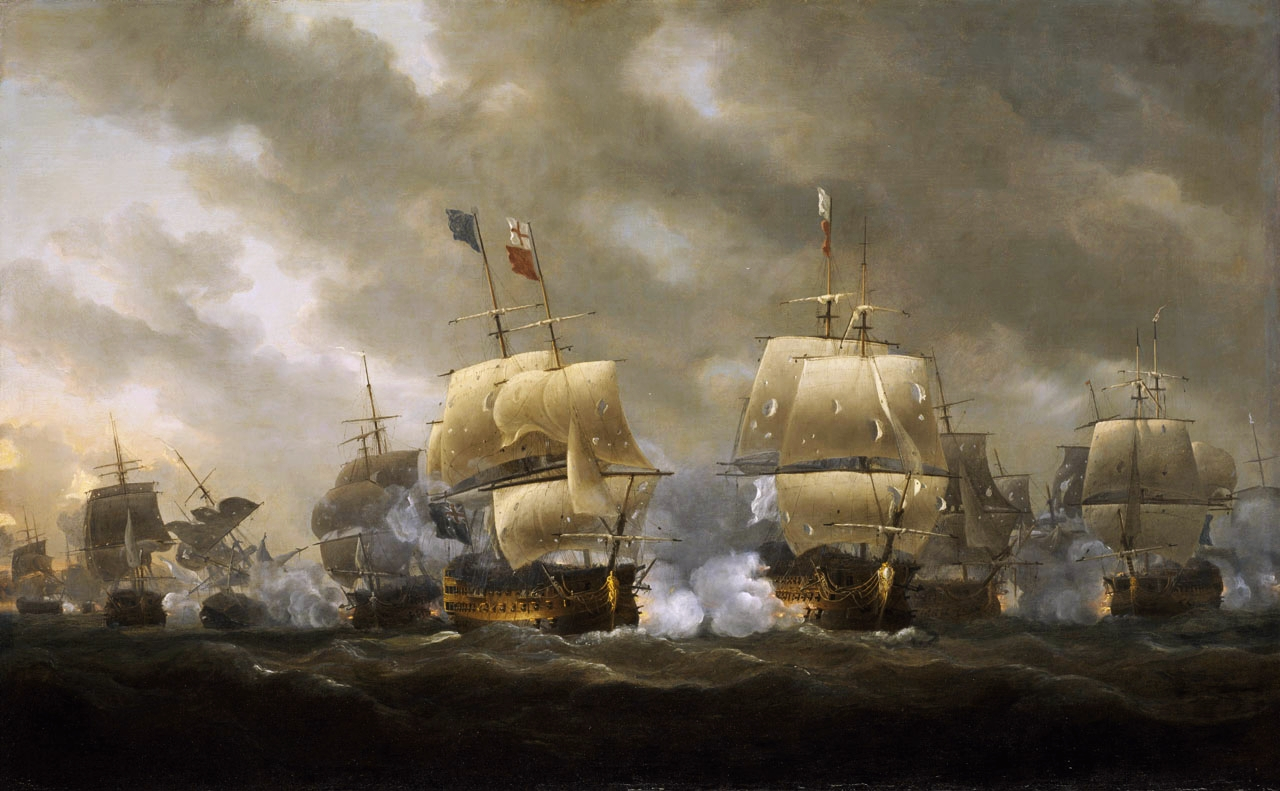
November 20: Battle of Quiberon Bay

- November 21 – Battle of Maxen: The Austrian army of Marshal von Daun cuts off and forces the surrender of a Prussian force, under Friedrich von Finck.
- November 25 – Near East earthquakes of 1759: The second and stronger event in an earthquake doublet occurs to the east of Beirut, with a surface wave magnitude of 7.4 and a maximum Mercalli intensity of IX (Violent), destroying all the villages in the Beqaa Valley.
- November 29 – Alamgir II, the Mughal Emperor of India, is assassinated in a conspiracy orchestrated by his Prime Minister, Imad-ul-Mulk. The Shah Alam II, a grandson of the 17th century Emperor Aurangzeb, is made the new Mughal Emperor.
- December 6 – The Germantown Union School (later called Germantown Academy), America's oldest nonsectarian day school, is founded.
- December 10 – Shah Jahan III is installed as the puppet ruler of India's Mughal Empire eleven days after the death of Alamgir II, but is removed after a reign of only ten months.
- December 31 – The Guinness Brewery is leased by Arthur Guinness in St. James's Gate, Dublin, Ireland, for the brewing of Guinness.

=== Date unknown ===
- Adam Smith publishes his Theory of Moral Sentiments, embodying some of his Glasgow lectures.
- The town of Egedesminde (modern Aasiaat) is founded in Greenland.
- English clockmaker John Harrison produces his "No. 1 sea watch" (H4), the first successful marine chronometer.
- The Kew Gardens are established in England by Princess Augusta of Saxe-Gotha, the mother of George III.
- Churton Town, the Orange County, North Carolina county seat laid out in 1754, is renamed Childsburgh, in honor of North Carolina attorney general Thomas Child. It is later renamed Hillsborough in 1766.
- Fire destroys 250 houses in Stockholm.
- Madame du Coudray publishes Abrégé de l'art des accouchements (The Art of Obstetrics), and the French government authorizes her to carry her instruction "throughout the realm" and promises financial support.

== Births ==
- January 25 – Robert Burns, Scottish poet (d. 1796)
- January 29 – Louis Augustin Guillaume Bosc, French botanist (d. 1828)
- February 15 – Friedrich August Wolf, German philologist, archaeologist (d. 1824)
- February 22 – Claude Lecourbe, French general (d. 1815)
- April 19 – August Wilhelm Iffland, German actor (d. 1814)
- April 22 – James Freeman, first clergyman in America to call himself a Unitarian (d. 1835)

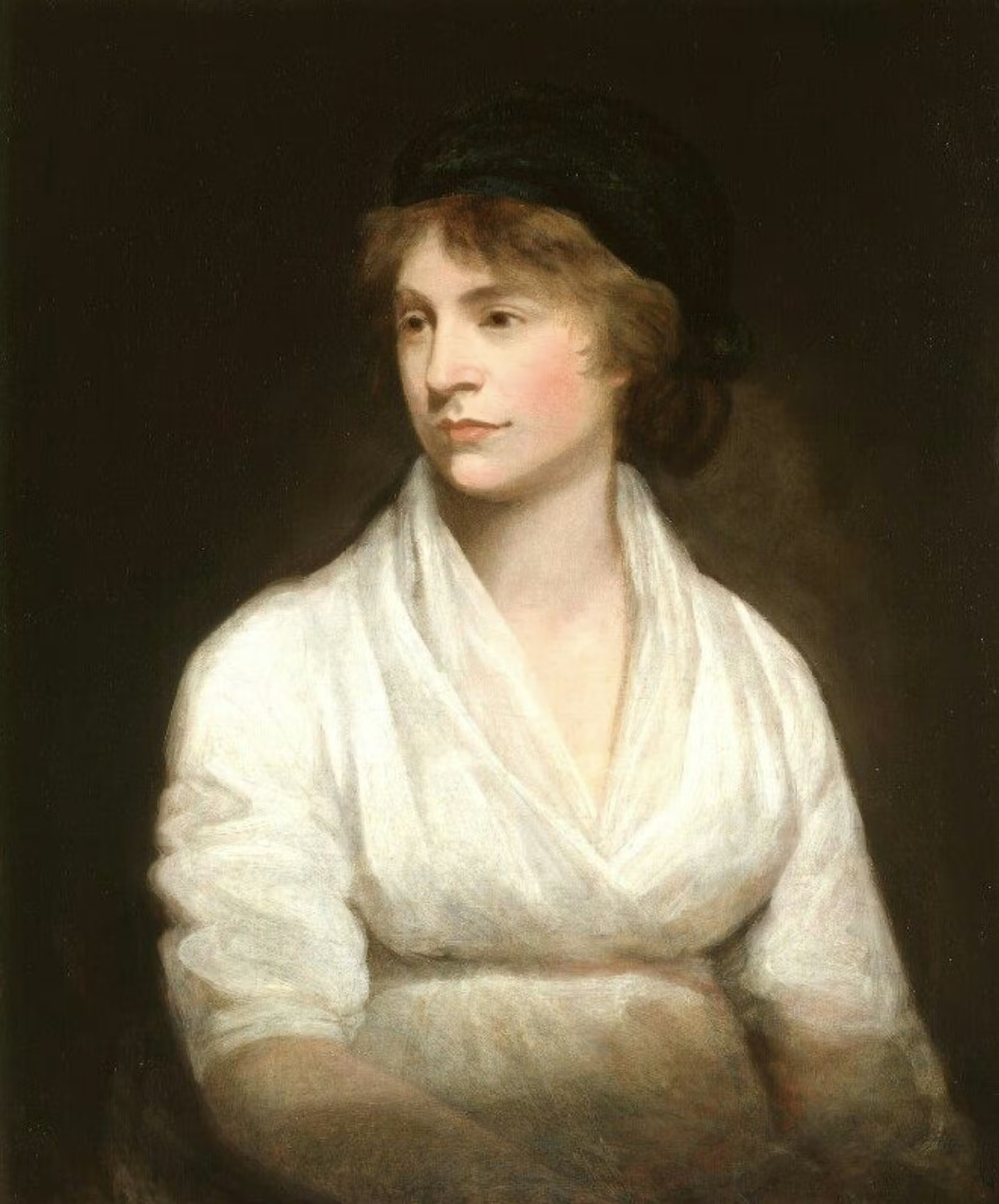
Mary Wollstonecraft

- April 27 – Mary Wollstonecraft, English feminist author (d. 1797)
- May 15 – Maria Theresia von Paradis, Austrian musician, composer (d. 1824)
- May 20 – William Thornton, American architect (d. 1828)
- May 21 – Joseph Fouché, French statesman (d. 1820)
- May 28 – William Pitt the Younger, Prime Minister of the United Kingdom (d. 1806)
- June 21 – Alexander J. Dallas, American statesman and financier (d. 1817)
- June 25 – William Plumer, American lawyer, Baptist lay preacher, and politician (d. 1850)
- July 2 – Nathan Read, American engineer and politician (d. 1849)
- July 31 – Ignaz Anton von Indermauer, Austrian nobleman and government official (d. 1796)

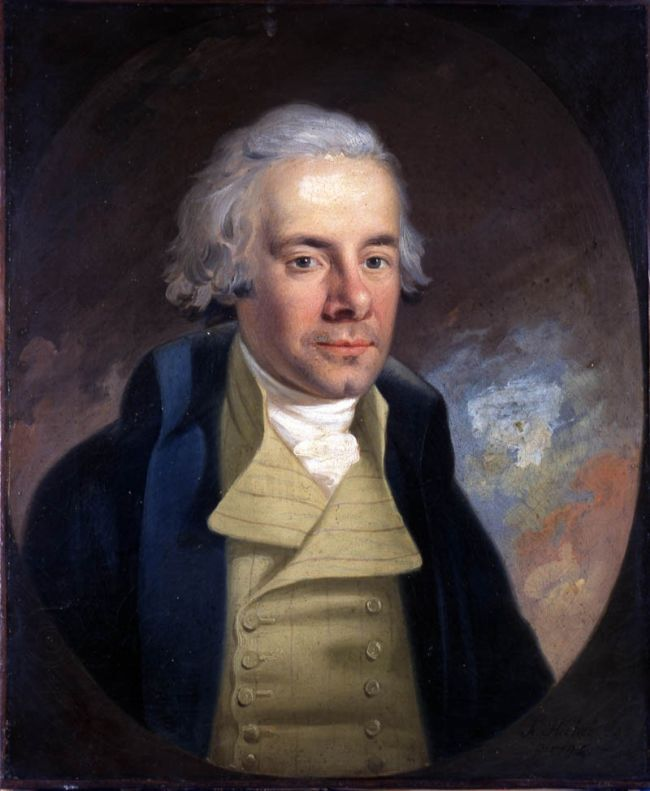
William Wilberforce

- August 24 – William Wilberforce, British abolitionist (d. 1833)
- September 10 – Lemuel Cook, American Revolutionary War veteran, centenarian (d. 1866)
- September 19 – William Kirby, English entomologist (d. 1850)
- October 25
  - Sophie Marie Dorothea of Württemberg, empress of Paul I of Russia (d. 1828)
  - William Grenville, 1st Baron Grenville, Prime Minister of the United Kingdom (d. 1834)
- October 26 – Georges Danton, French Revolutionary leader (d. 1794)

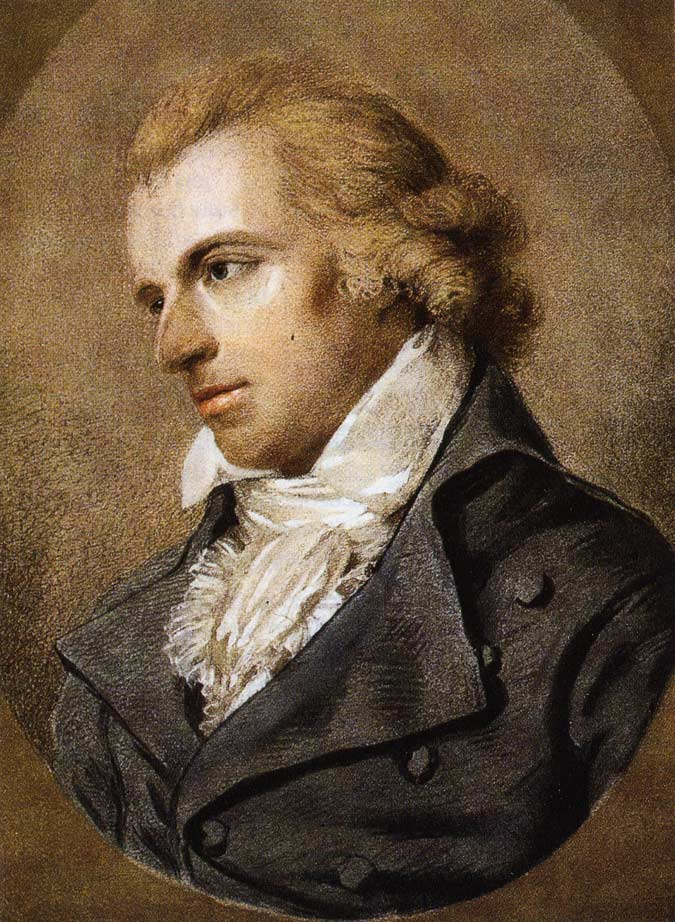
Friedrich Schiller

- November 10 – Friedrich Schiller, German writer (d. 1805)
- November 27 – Franz Krommer, Czech composer (d. 1831)
- November 23 – Felipe Enrique Neri, legislator and colonizer of Texas (d. 1820)
- December 2 – James Edward Smith, English botanist (d. 1828)
- Date unknown – Maria Petraccini, Italian anatomist, physician (d. 1791)
  - Salomea Deszner, Polish actress, singer and theater director (d. 1806)
  - Alice Flowerdew, British teacher, religious poet, hymnwriter (d. 1830)

== Deaths ==
- January 12 – Anne, Princess Royal and Princess of Orange, regent of Friesland (b. 1709)
- February 9 – Louise Henriette of Bourbon, Duchess of Orléans, mother of Philippe Égalité (b. 1726)
- February 20 – Georg Anton Urlaub, German painter (b. 1713)
- February 27 – Jacob Theodor Klein, German scholar (b. 1685)
- March 11 – John Forbes, British general (b. 1707)
- April 6 – Johann Gottfried Zinn, German anatomist, botanist (b. 1727)

George Frideric Handel

- April 14 – George Frideric Handel, German composer (b. 1685)
- May 12 – Lambert-Sigisbert Adam, French sculptor (b. 1700)
- May 23 – Landgravine Eleonore of Hesse-Rotenburg, Countess (b. 1712)
- June 3 – Didier Diderot, French craftsman (b. 1685)
- June 20 – Margareta Capsia, Finnish artist (b. 1682)
- June 27 – Jacques Claude Marie Vincent de Gournay, French economist (b. 1712)
- July 6 – William Pepperrell, English colonial soldier (b. 1696)
- July 27 – Pierre Louis Moreau de Maupertuis, French mathematician (b. 1698)
- August 8 – Carl Heinrich Graun, German composer (b. 1704)
- August 10 – King Ferdinand VI of Spain (b. 1713)
- August 16 – Eugene Aram, English philologist and murderer, hanged (b. 1704)
- August 24 – Ewald Christian von Kleist, German poet (b. 1715)
- September 10 – Ferdinand Konščak, Croatian explorer (b. 1703)
- September 13 – James Wolfe, British general (b. 1727)
- September 14 – Louis-Joseph de Montcalm, French general (b. 1712)
- September 16 – Nicolas Antoine Boulanger, French philosopher (b. 1722)
- October 10 – Granville Elliott, Army General, British military expert, working for Britain and Palatine forces (b. 1713)
- October 27 – Konstancja Czartoryska, Polish noblewoman politician (b. 1700)
- November 14 – Grégoire Orlyk, Ukrainian-born French Lieutenant General (b. 1702)
- November 29 – Nicolaus I Bernoulli, Swiss mathematician (b. 1687)
- December 6 – Princess Louise-Élisabeth of France, daughter of King Louis XV (b. 1727)
- date unknown
  - Alberto Pullicino, Maltese painter (b. 1719)
  - King Thipchang of the Realm of Lampang (b. c. 1675)
