= 1805 in Iran =

- Decades
- See also: Other events of 1805; Years in Iran

The following lists events that happened during 1805 in Qajar era.

== Incumbents ==
- Monarch: Fath-Ali Shah Qajar

== Births ==
- February 26 – Malek Jahan Khanom, Regent of Persia, Qajar queen mother and princess.
