= 1810 in Iran =

- Decades
- See also: Other events of 1810; Years in Iran

The following lists events that happened during 1810 in Qajar era.

== Incumbents ==
- Monarch: Fath-Ali Shah Qajar
