= 1803 in Iran =

- Decades
- See also: Other events of 1803; Years in Iran

The following lists events that happened during 1803 in Qajar era.

== Incumbents ==
- Monarch: Fath-Ali Shah Qajar
