= 1802 in Iran =

- Decades
- See also: Other events of 1802; Years in Iran

The following lists events that happened during 1802 in Qajar era.

== Incumbents ==
- Monarch: Fath-Ali Shah Qajar

== Births ==
- June 22 – Alexander Kasimovich Kazembek, Russian orientalist, historian and philologist.
