= 1812 in Iran =

- Decades
- See also: Other events of 1812; Years in Iran

The following lists events that happened during 1812 in Qajar era.

== Incumbents ==
- Monarch: Fath-Ali Shah Qajar

== Births ==
- ? – Hujjat (Bábí), Babi leader.
- ? – Mirza Yusuf Ashtiani, Iranian politician.
