= 1814 in Iran =

- Decades
- See also: Other events of 1814; Years in Iran

The following lists events that happened during 1814 in Qajar era.

== Incumbents ==
- Monarch: Fath-Ali Shah Qajar

== Births ==
- ? – Emamqoli Mirza Emad od-Dowleh, Persian Qajar prince and governor.
