= 1816 in Iran =

- Decades
- See also: Other events of 1816; Years in Iran

The following lists events that happened during 1816 in Qajar era.

== Incumbents ==
- Monarch: Fath-Ali Shah Qajar

== Deaths ==
- ? – Mirza-ye Qomi, Iranian Islamic scholar and writer.
