= John Jefferys =

Board game designer

John Jefferys, is the first game designer to whom a game design can be definitively ascribed (in the Anglophone world).

== Life ==
He is the designer of the 1759 game A Journey Through Europe, which was based upon Game of the Goose. The game is inscribed "Invented and sold by the Proprietor, John Jefferys, at his house in Chapel Street, near the Broad Way, Westmr. Writing Master, Accompt. Geographer, etc. Printed for Carrington Bowles, Map & Printseller, No 69 in St. Paul's Church Yard, London. Price 8s. Published as the Act directs, September 14th, 1759." The game was among the oldest English cartographic board games.

As with most 18th century British original board games, it is a track game, with the kind of game mechanics familiar in track games today (e.g., landing on certain spaces advances you or sends you back to other spaces). Rather than using dice, players used a teetotum, a multi-sided top, with a number on each side, players moving the number of spaces indicated by the uppermost side when the top falls. (Dice were considered gambling instruments, and not appropriate in Christian households.) The game was designed to help players learn about geographical features of the European Continent.
