= Bà Huyện Thanh Quan =

Vietnamese poet

- Born: 1805
- Died: 1848 (aged 42–43)
- Occupation: Poet

Nguyễn Thị Hinh, popularly known as Bà Huyện Thanh Quan (chữ Nôm: 婆縣青關, Lady of the Thanh Quan District Chief) (Vĩnh Thuận, 1805–1848) was a Vietnamese female poet.

== Biography ==
Nguyễn Thị Hinh was born in Nghi Tàm ward, Vĩnh Thuận district, near Hồ Tây (now Quảng An ward, Tây Hồ district), Hanoi. Her father, Nguyễn Lý (1755-1837), was the valedictorian in 1783, during the reign of Emperor Lê Hiển Tông. She is a student of Pham Quy Thich (1760-1825) and the wife of Luu Nghi (1804-1847). She passed the examination for the degree of Cử nhân in 1821 (the second year of Emperor Minh Mang’s reign) and was assigned to be the district chief of Thanh Quan (currently Thai Thuy district, Thai Binh province), hence her nickname: Ba Huyen Thanh Quan.

== Works ==
Bà Huyện Thanh Quan is famous for composing poems in Hán Nôm, some works including,

=== Crossing Ngang Pass (Qua đèo Ngang, 戈𡸇卬) ===
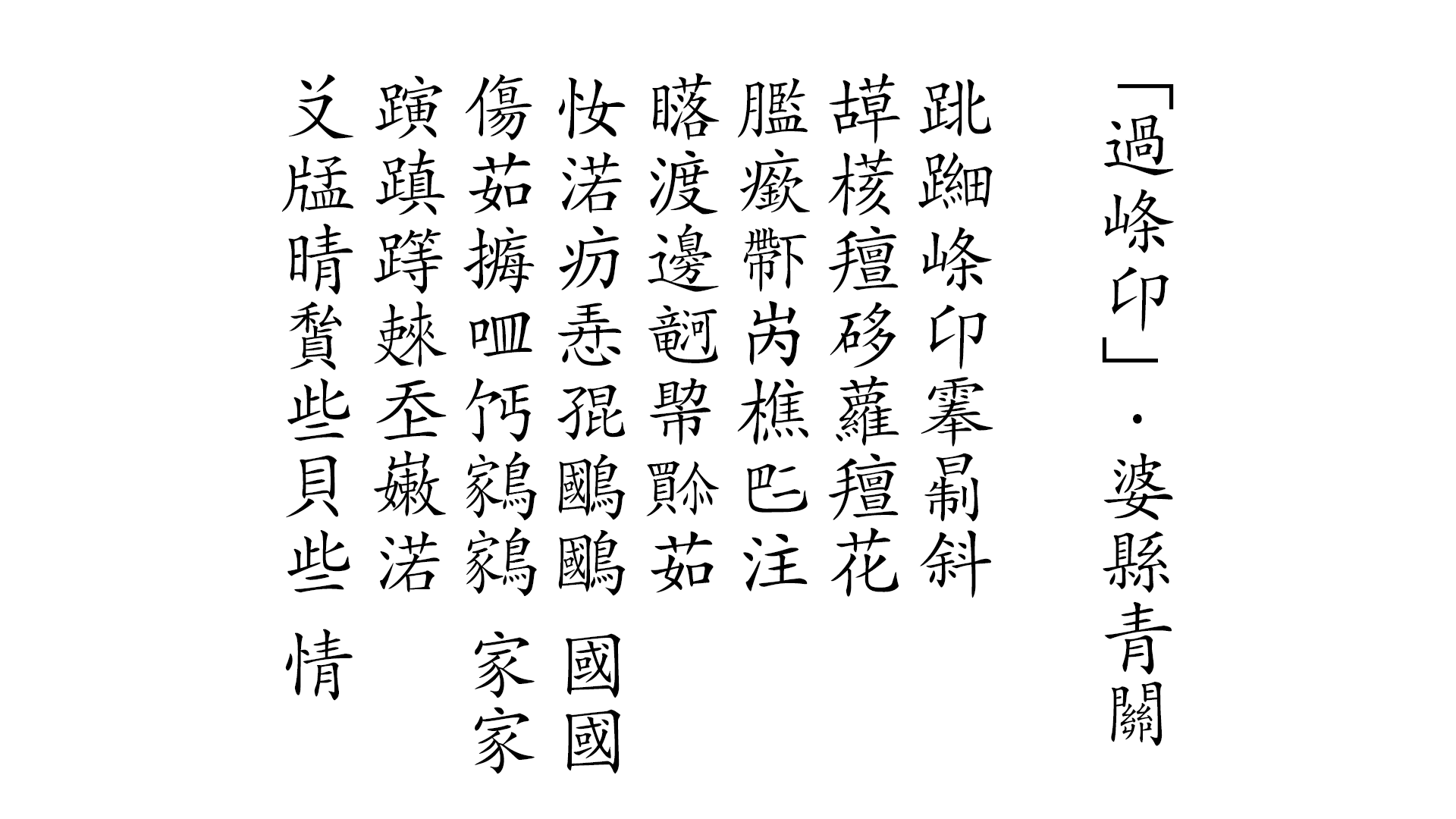

Vietnamese Chữ Nôm (chữ Nôm, 𡨸喃)	Vietnamese alphabet (chữ Quốc Ngữ, 𡨸國語)	English Translation
𨀈𬧐𡸇卬，𩃳㫼斜，	Bước tới Đèo Ngang, bóng xế tà,	Arriving at Ngang Pass at dusk,
𦹯𣘃𢷆𥒥，蘿𢷆花。	Cỏ cây chen đá, lá chen hoa.	Grass trees mix with rocks, leaves mix with flowers.
𦡶𤺰𠁑𡶀，樵𠄧注，	Lom khom dưới núi, tiều vài chú,	Hunched below the foothills, a handful of woodcutters,
𥋷渡邊𪷹，𢄂𫣿茹。	Lác đác bên sông, chợ mấy nhà.	Scattered across the stream, a couple of market stalls.
𪡑渃𤴬𢚸，𡥵𫛐𫛐，「國國」	Nhớ nước đau lòng, con cuốc cuốc (quốc quốc),	Missing homeland rends the heart of, the quail,
傷茹𢵹𠰘，丐𬷬𬷬。「家家」	Thương nhà mỏi miệng, cái da da (gia gia).	Loving home tires the mouth of, the partridge.
𨄻蹎𨅸𫣚，𡗶，𡽫，渃，	Dừng chân đứng lại, trời, non, nước,	Stopping (to see), sky, mountains, water,
𠬠𥕊情𥢅，些貝些。	Một mảnh tình riêng, ta với ta.	A private feeling of utter lonesomeness, myself with myself.
