= 1804 in Iran =

- Decades
- See also: Other events of 1804; Years in Iran

The following lists events that have happened in 1804 in the Qajar dynasty.

== Incumbents ==
- Monarch: Fat′h-Ali Shah Qajar

== Events ==
- Battle of Ganja (1804)
- Russo-Persian War (1804–13) begins.
