= 1807 in Iran =

- Decades
- See also: Other events of 1807; Years in Iran

The following lists events that happened in 1807 in the Qajar dynasty, Iran.

== Incumbents ==
- Monarch: Fat′h-Ali Shah Qajar

== Events ==
- May 4 – Treaty of Finckenstein was signed between Iran and France.
