= Salomea Deszner =

Polish actress (1759–1806)

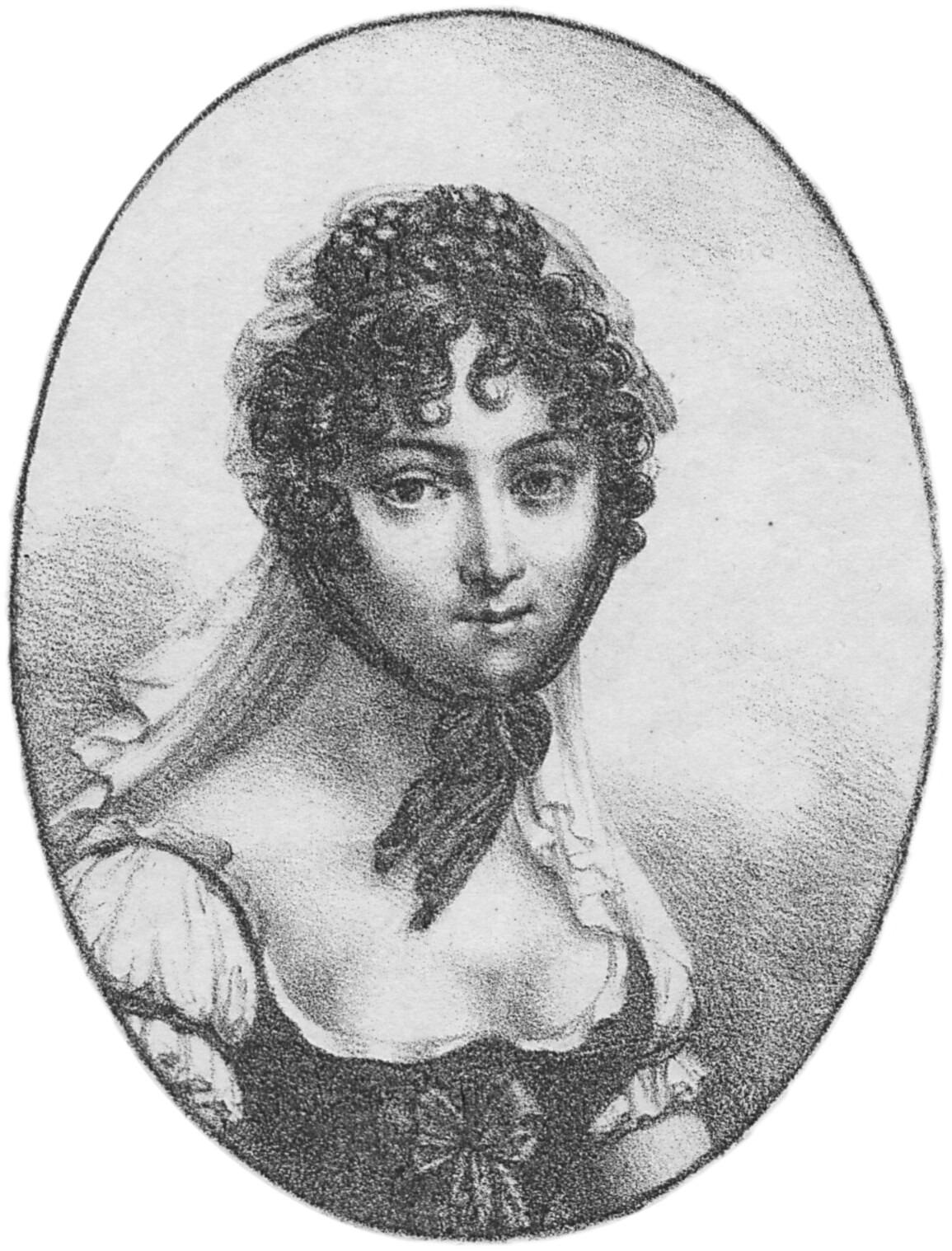
Salomea Deszner

Salomea Deszner (née Teschner, Teszner; 1759 – 20 March 1806), was a Polish stage actress, opera singer, and theater director, active 1777–1806.

Her father, Adam Teschner, was employed in the household of the aristocratic Branicki family, and she was noticed by the king and engaged at his theater. She was employed at Warsaw's National Theatre in 1777-85 and 1789–96, and in the theater in Vilnius in 1785-89 and 1796–1801. She was the director of the theater in Grodno from 1802 until 1806, and as such had authority over the theatrical policy in the entire district. As an actor, she was regarded as belonging to the elite in Poland, and she was active in tragedy, comedy, and opera, was famed in breeches roles, and was particularly known for the part of Minna von Barnhelm. She participated in the first opera buffa in Poland, Dla miłości zmyślone szaleństwo (1779).
