= 1808 in Iran =

- Decades
- See also: Other events of 1808; Years in Iran

The following lists events that happened in 1808 in the Sublime State of Persia.

== Incumbents ==
- Monarch: Fat′h-Ali Shah Qajar

== Birth ==
- January 5 – Mohammad Shah Qajar, third king of Qajar dynasty, was born in Tabriz, Iran.
