= 1813 in Iran =

- Decades
- See also: Other events of 1813; Years in Iran

The following lists events that have happened in 1813 in the Sublime State of Persia.

== Incumbents ==
- Monarch: Fat′h-Ali Shah Qajar

== Events ==
- Russo-Persian War (1804–13) finished.
- October – Treaty of Gulistan signed between Persia and Russia.
