= 1806 =

1806 in various calendars
- Gregorian calendar: 1806; MDCCCVI
- Ab urbe condita: 2559
- Armenian calendar: 1255; ԹՎ ՌՄԾԵ
- Assyrian calendar: 6556
- Balinese saka calendar: 1727–1728
- Bengali calendar: 1212–1213
- Berber calendar: 2756
- British Regnal year: 46 Geo. 3 – 47 Geo. 3
- Buddhist calendar: 2350
- Burmese calendar: 1168
- Byzantine calendar: 7314–7315
- Chinese calendar: 乙丑年 (Wood Ox); 4503 or 4296 — to — 丙寅年 (Fire Tiger); 4504 or 4297
- Coptic calendar: 1522–1523
- Discordian calendar: 2972
- Ethiopian calendar: 1798–1799
- Hebrew calendar: 5566–5567
- Hindu calendars
- Vikram Samvat: 1862–1863
- Shaka Samvat: 1727–1728
- Kali Yuga: 4906–4907
- Holocene calendar: 11806
- Igbo calendar: 806–807
- Iranian calendar: 1184–1185
- Islamic calendar: 1220–1221
- Japanese calendar: Bunka 3 (文化３年)
- Javanese calendar: 1732–1733
- Julian calendar: Gregorian minus 12 days
- Korean calendar: 4139
- Minguo calendar: 106 before ROC 民前106年
- Nanakshahi calendar: 338
- Thai solar calendar: 2348–2349
- Tibetan calendar: ཤིང་མོ་གླང་ལོ་ (female Wood-Ox); 1932 or 1551 or 779 — to — མེ་ཕོ་སྟག་ལོ་ (male Fire-Tiger); 1933 or 1552 or 780

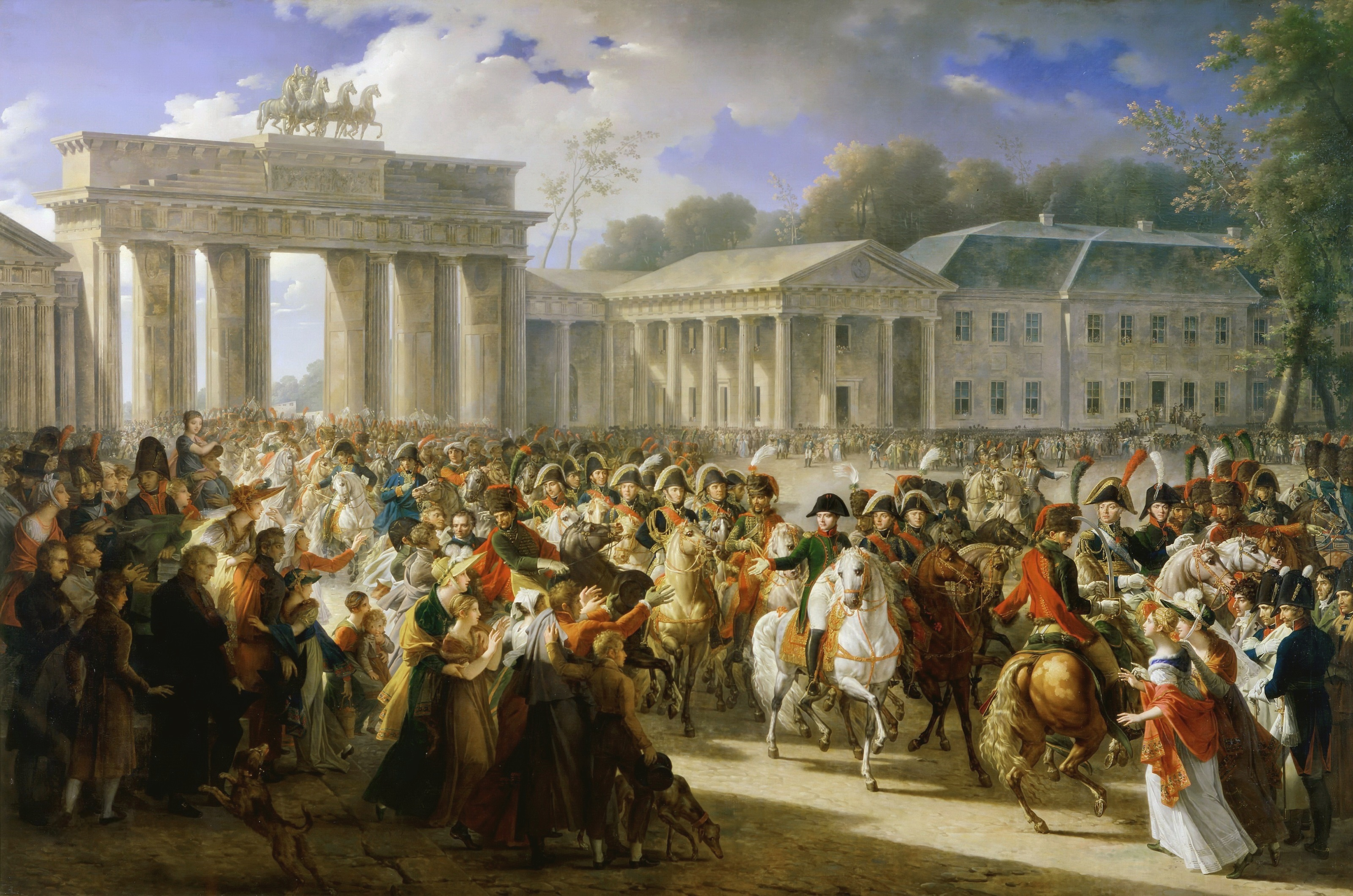
October 27. Entry of Napoleon into Berlin. French troops enter Berlin following Jena.

1806 (MDCCCVI) was a common year starting on Wednesday of the Gregorian calendar and a common year starting on Monday of the Julian calendar, the 1806th year of the Common Era (CE) and Anno Domini (AD) designations, the 806th year of the 2nd millennium, the 6th year of the 19th century, and the 7th year of the 1800s decade. As of the start of 1806, the Gregorian calendar was 12 days ahead of the Julian calendar, which remained in localized use until 1923.

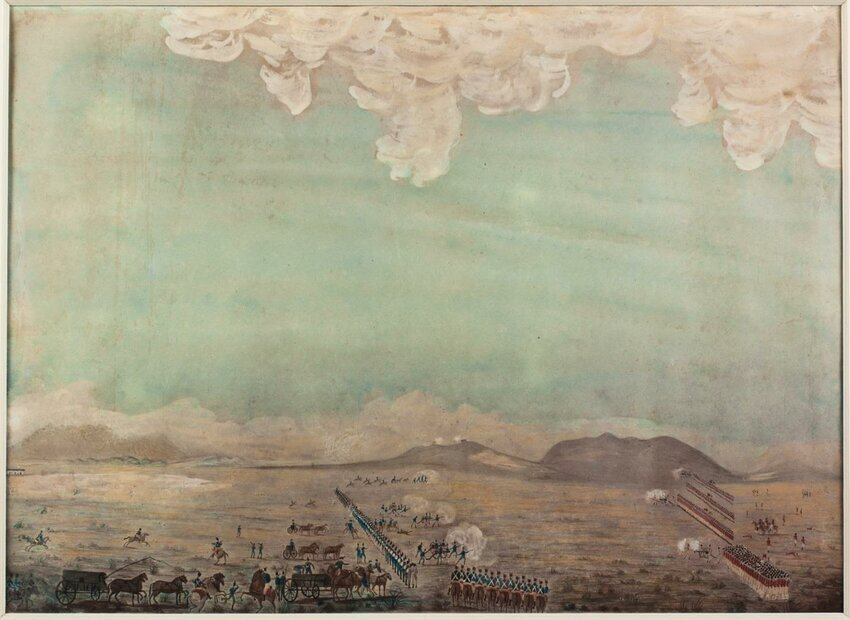
January 8: Battle of Blaauwberg

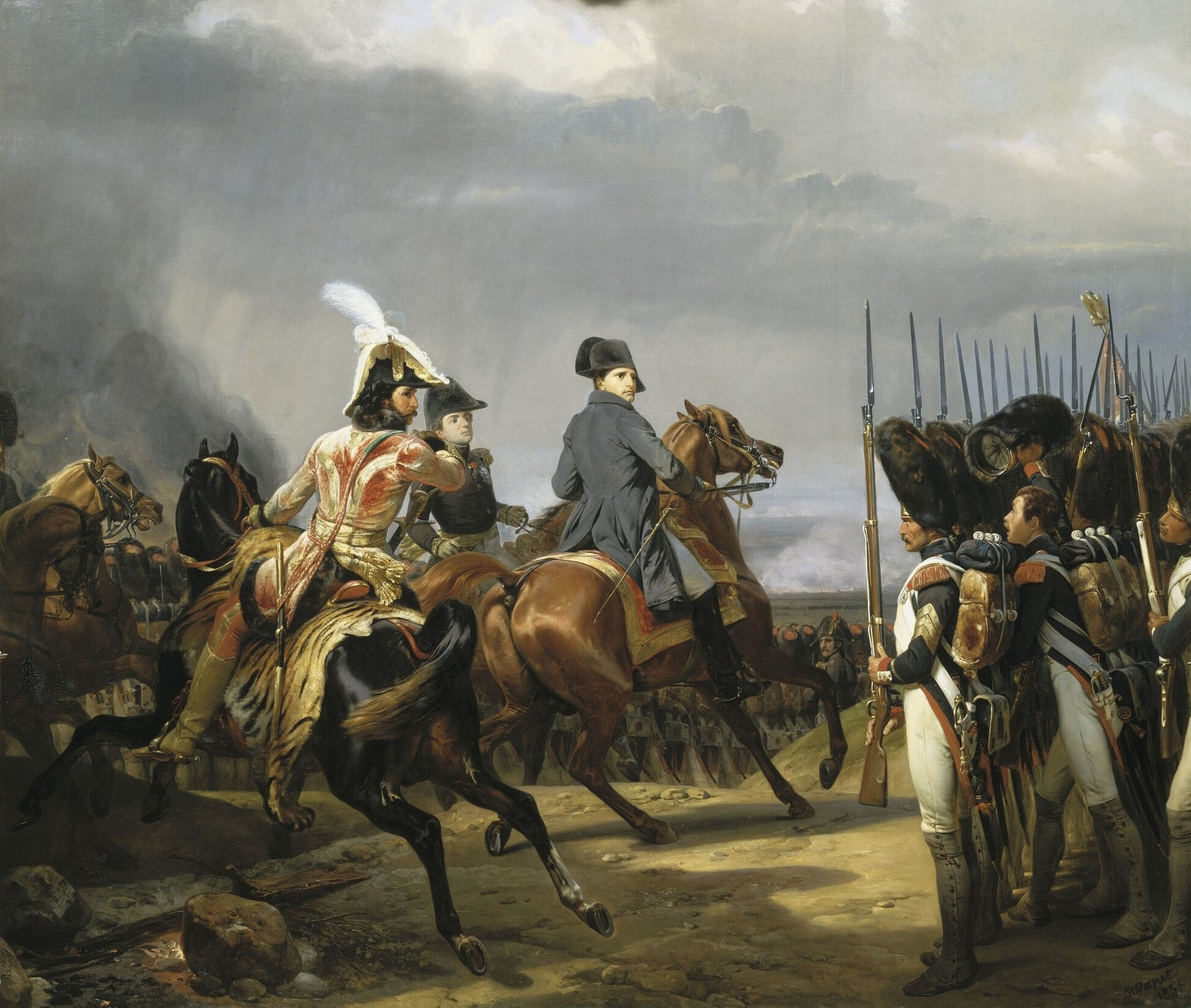
October 14: Battle of Jena–Auerstedt

== Events ==
=== January–March ===
- January 1
  - The French Republican Calendar is abolished.
  - The Kingdom of Bavaria is established by Napoleon.
- January 8 – Battle of Blaauwberg: British infantry force troops of the Batavian Republic in the Dutch Cape Colony to withdraw.
- January 9
  - The Dutch commandant of Cape Town surrenders to British forces. On January 10, formal capitulation is signed under the Treaty Tree in Papendorp (modern-day Woodstock).
  - Lord Nelson is given a state funeral and interment at St Paul's Cathedral in London, attended by the Prince of Wales.
- January 18 – The Dutch Cape Colony capitulates to British forces, the origin of its status as a colony within the British Empire.
- January 23
  - Following the death of William Pitt the Younger, his cousin Lord Grenville succeeds him as wartime Prime Minister of the United Kingdom.
  - Invasion of Naples: Ferdinand I of the Two Sicilies flees to the Kingdom of Sicily under British protection.
- February 6 – Battle of San Domingo: The British Royal Navy gains a victory over the French off Santo Domingo.
- February 15 – Invasion of Naples: Joseph Bonaparte enters Naples.
- March 23 – Explorers Lewis and Clark and their Corps of Discovery, having reached the Pacific Ocean after traveling through the Louisiana Purchase, begin their journey home.
- March 28 – Washington College (modern-day Washington & Jefferson College) is chartered by the Pennsylvania General Assembly.
- March 30 – The Napoleonic Kingdom of Naples is proclaimed.

=== April–June ===
- April 8 – Stéphanie de Beauharnais, adopted daughter of Emperor Napoleon I, marries Prince Karl Ludwig Friedrich of Baden.
- April 25 – Rana Bahadur Shah is killed by his step-brother Sher Bahadur Shah in the late night meeting which triggers the two weeks' long Bhandarkhal garden massacre in Khatmandu.
- May 16 – A British Order in Council of 16 May 1806 declares all ports from Brest (France) to the Elbe to be under a state of blockade by the British Royal Navy.
- May 30 – Future President of the United States Andrew Jackson fights his third duel, killing lawyer Charles Dickinson following a dispute over payment of a forfeit.
- June 5 – Louis Bonaparte is appointed as King of Holland by his brother, Emperor Napoleon, replacing the Batavian Republic.

=== July–September ===
- July 4 – Invasion of Naples (War of the Third Coalition): Battle of Maida – Britain defeats the French in Calabria.
- July 10 – Vellore Mutiny: Indian sepoys mutiny against the East India Company, for the first time.
- July 12 – Sixteen German Imperial States leave the Holy Roman Empire and form the Confederation of the Rhine, leading to the collapse of the Empire. Liechtenstein is given full sovereignty.
- July 15 – Pike Expedition: Near St. Louis, Missouri, United States Army Lieutenant Zebulon Pike leads an expedition from Fort Bellefontaine, to explore the American West.
- July 18 – 1806 Birgu polverista explosion: A gunpowder magazine explosion in Birgu, Malta kills around 200 people.
- July 23 – British invasions of the River Plate: A British expeditionary force of 1,700 men lands on the left bank of the Río de la Plata and invades Buenos Aires.
- August 6 – Francis II, the last Holy Roman Emperor, abdicates, thus ending the Holy Roman Empire after 844 years.
- August 18 – English seal hunter Abraham Bristow discovers the Auckland Islands.
- September 23 – The Lewis and Clark Expedition reaches St. Louis, Missouri, ending a successful exploration of the Louisiana Territory and the Pacific Northwest. Their arrival comes "much to the amazement of residents, who had given the travelers up for dead" according to one historian.
- September 25 – Prussia issues an ultimatum to Paris, threatening war if France does not halt marching its troops through Prussian territory to reach Austria; the message does not reach Napoleon Bonaparte until October 7, and he responds by attacking Prussia.

=== October–December ===
- October 8 – Napoleon responds to the September 25 ultimatum from Prussia, and begins the War of the Fourth Coalition; Prussia is joined by Saxony and other minor German states.
- October 9 – Battle of Schleiz: French and Prussian forces fight for the first time since the war began. A more numerous French force easily defeats the Prussian army.
- October 10 - Battle of Saalfeld: French forces under Marshal Jean Lannes clash at Saalfeld with a Prussian advance guard. The Prussian troops are routed, and Prince Louis Ferdinand of Prussia is killed in combat.
- October 14 – Battle of Jena–Auerstedt: At Jena, Napoleon defeats the Prussian army of Prince Hohenlohe, while at Auerstedt, Marshal Davout defeats the main Prussian army under Karl Wilhelm Ferdinand, Duke of Brunswick (who is fatally wounded).
- October 17 – Emperor Jacques I of Haiti (Jean-Jacques Dessalines) is assassinated at the Pont-Rouge, Haiti, and Alexandre Pétion becomes first President of the Republic of Haiti.
- October 20 – British ship of the line HMS Athenienne (1800) is wrecked in the Strait of Sicily with the loss of 347 of the 488 on board.
- October 24 – French forces enter Berlin.
- October 30 – Capitulation of Stettin: Believing themselves massively outnumbered, the 5,300-man garrison at Stettin in Prussia surrenders to a much smaller French force without a fight.
- November 15 – Pike Expedition: During his second exploratory expedition, Lieutenant Zebulon Pike sees a distant mountain peak while near the Colorado foothills of the Rocky Mountains (later named Pikes Peak in his honor).
- November 21 – Napoleon's Berlin Decree initiates the Continental System, blocking the import of British manufactured goods to the rest of Europe.
- November 24 – The last major Prussian field force, under Gebhard Leberecht von Blücher, surrenders to the French near Lübeck. Frederick William III has by this time fled to Memel in East Prussia.
- November 28 – French troops enter Warsaw.
- December 23 – Ludwig van Beethoven premieres his violin concerto at the Theater an der Wien.
- December 26 – War of the Fourth Coalition:
  - Battle of Pułtusk – Russian forces under General Bennigsen narrowly escape from a direct confrontation with Napoleon, who goes into winter quarters.
  - Battle of Golymin – Russian forces under General Golitsyn fight a successful rearguard action against French forces, under Marshal Murat.

== Births ==
=== January–June ===
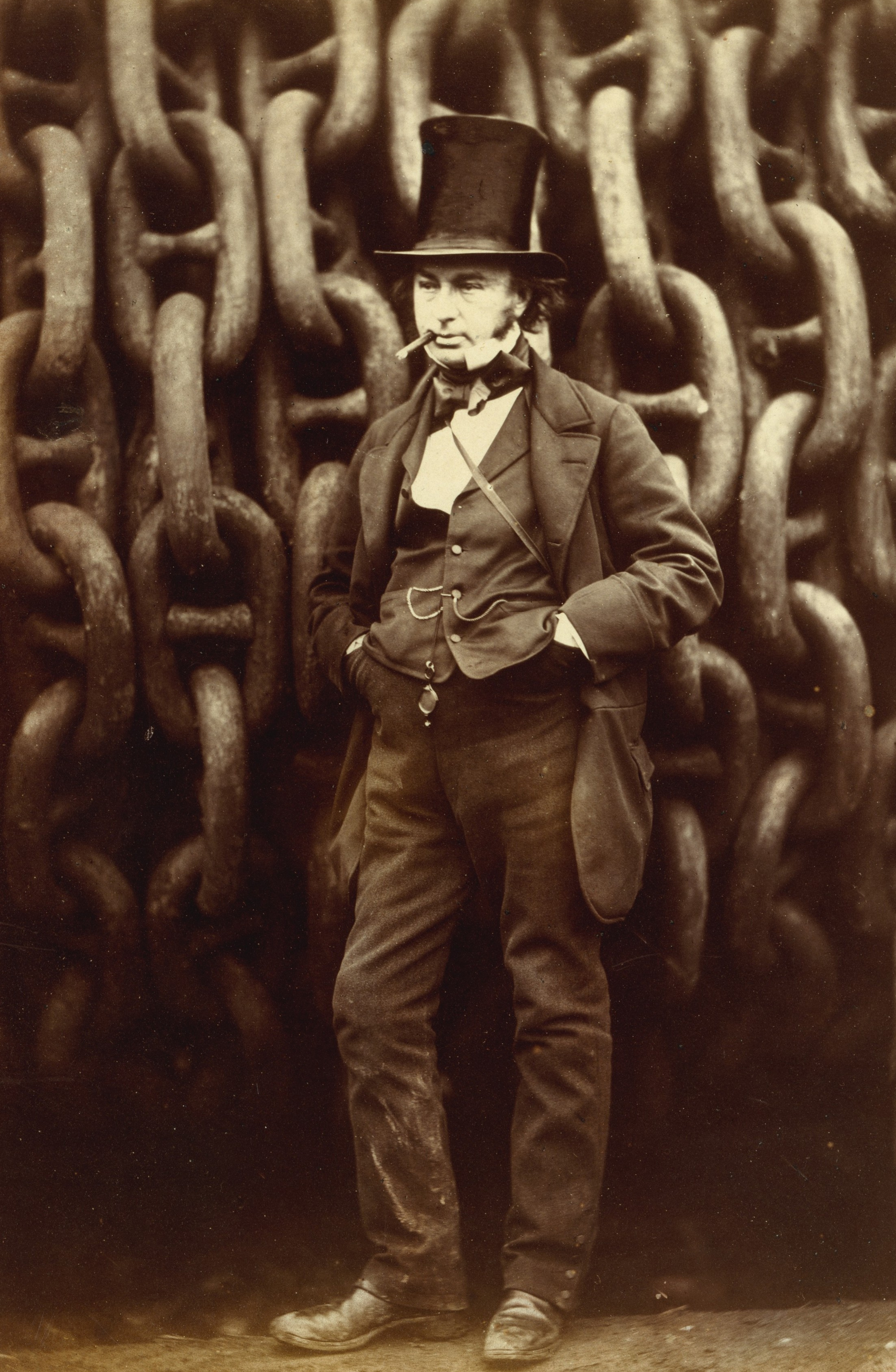
Isambard Kingdom Brunel

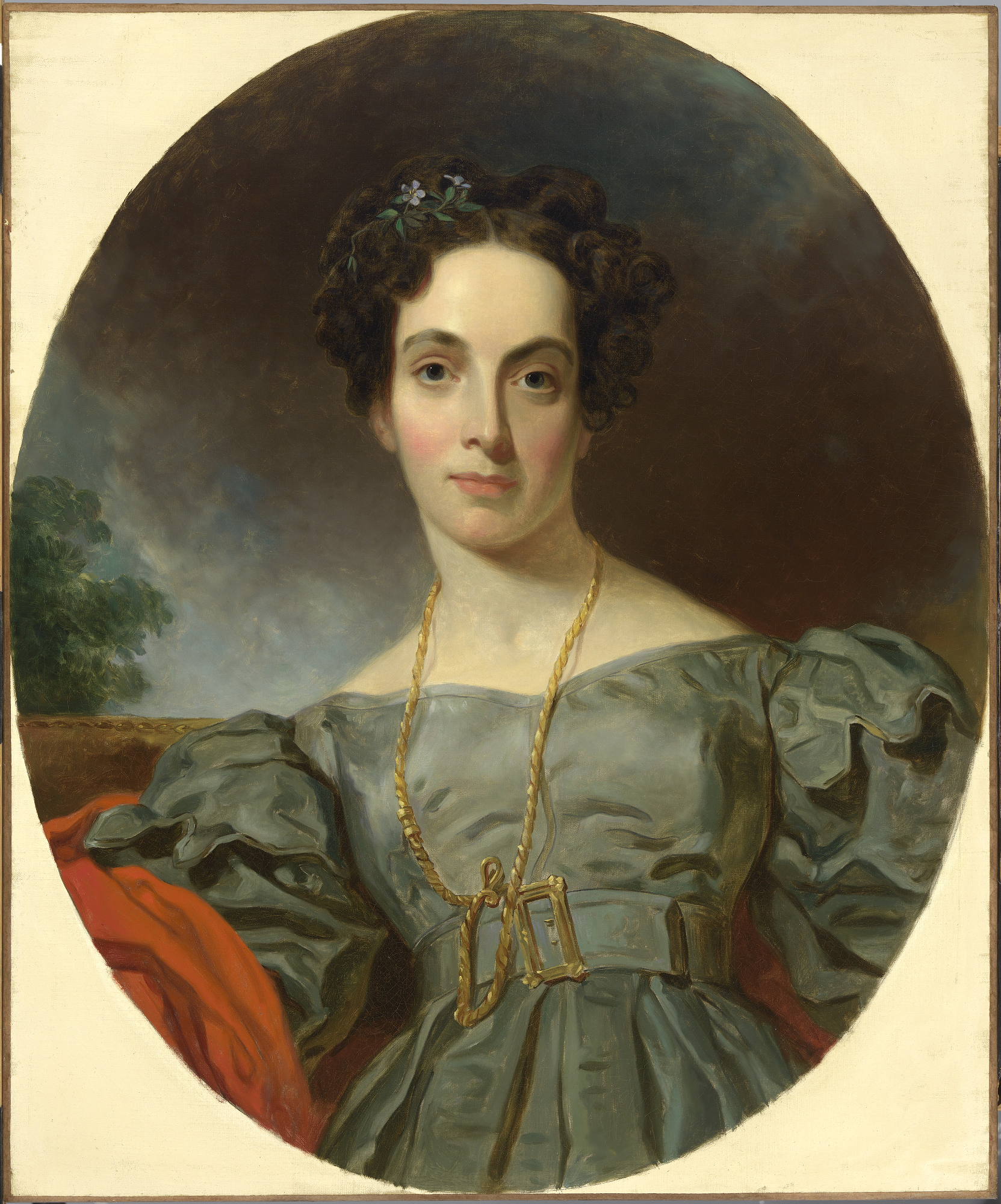
Emma Catherine Embury

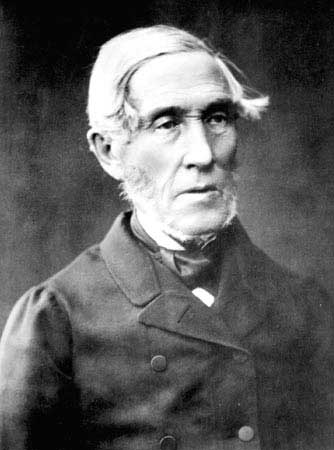
J. V. Snellman

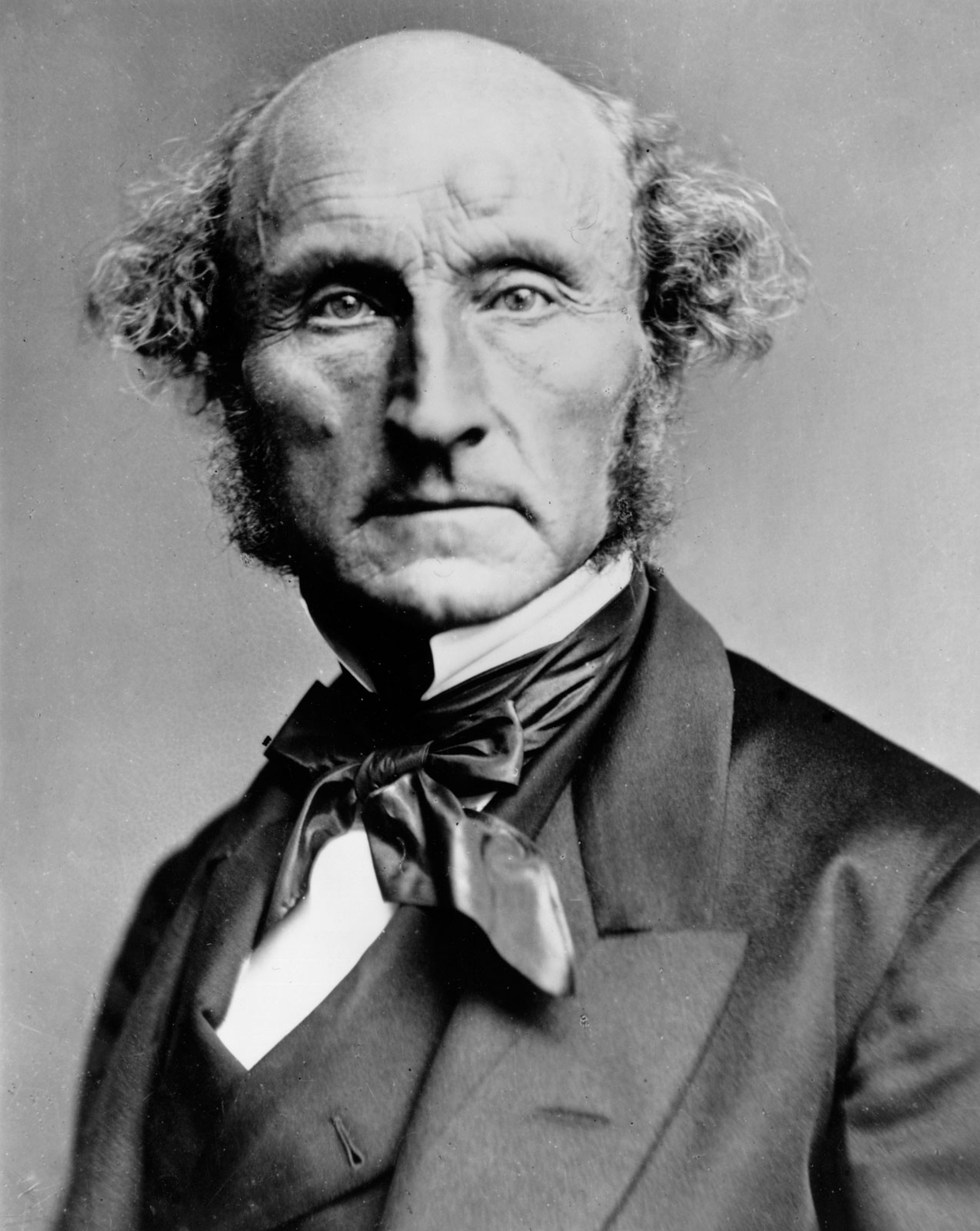
John Stuart Mill

- January 1 – Lionel Kieseritzky, Baltic-German chess player (d. 1853)
- January 27 – Juan Crisóstomo Arriaga, Spanish composer (d. 1826)
- February 22 – Józef Kremer, Polish messianic philosopher (d. 1875)
- March 4
  - Ephraim Wales Bull, American farmer, creator of the Concord grape (d. 1895)
  - George Bradburn, American abolitionist, women's rights advocate (d. 1880)
- March 6 – Elizabeth Barrett Browning, English poet (d. 1861)
- March 11 – Carlo Pellion di Persano, Italian admiral, politician (d. 1883)
- March 12 – Jane Pierce, First Lady of the United States (d. 1863)
- March 21 – Benito Juárez, Mexican statesman, folk hero (d. 1872)
- March 28 – Ludolph Anne Jan Wilt Sloet van de Beele, Governor-General of the Dutch East Indies (d. 1890)
- April 3 – Ivan Kireyevsky, Russian literary critic, philosopher (d. 1856)
- April 6 – Friedrich Wilhelm Ritschl, German scholar (d. 1876)
- April 9 – Isambard Kingdom Brunel, British civil engineer (d. 1859)
- May 2 – Catherine Labouré, French visionary, saint (d. 1876)
- May 4 – William Fothergill Cooke, English inventor (d. 1879)
- May 12 – J. V. Snellman, Finnish statesman and influential Fennoman philosopher (d. 1881)
- May 20 – John Stuart Mill, British philosopher (d. 1873)
- June 12 – John Augustus Roebling, German-American engineer (d. 1869)
- June 27 – Augustus De Morgan, British mathematician, logician (d. 1871)

=== July–December ===
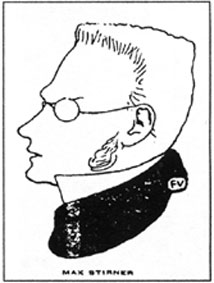
Max Stirner

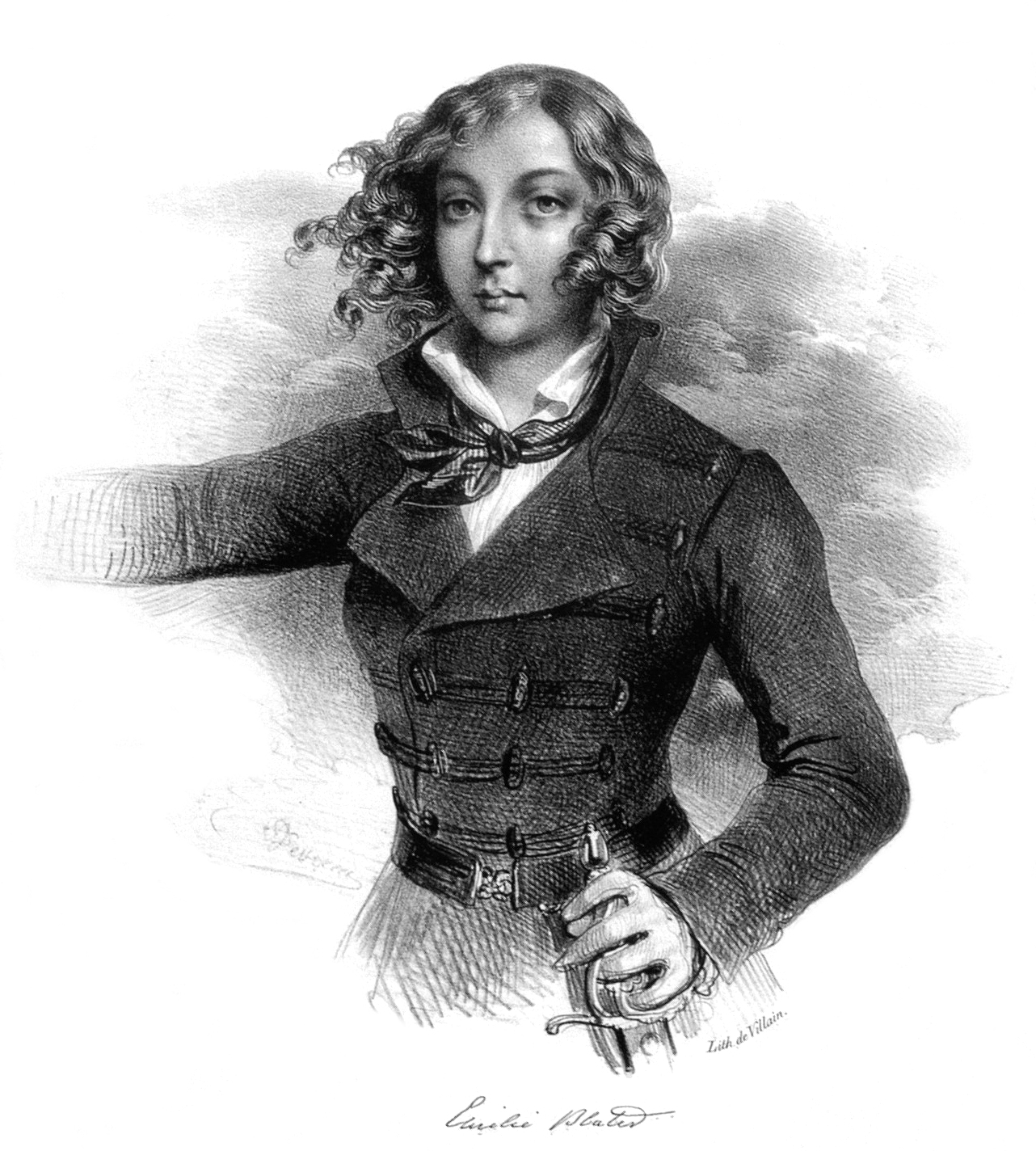
Emilia Plater

- July 5
  - James Dawson, Scottish-born Australian settler, champion of aboriginal interests (d. 1900)
  - Blanka Teleki, Hungarian countess, women's rights activist (d. 1862)
- September 12 – Andrew Hull Foote, American admiral (d. 1863)
- September 22 – Bernardino António Gomes, Portuguese physician and naturalist (d. 1877)
- October 3 – Oliver Cowdery, American religious leader (d. 1850)
- October 25 – Max Stirner, German philosopher (d. 1856)
- November 10 – Sir Alexander Milne, British admiral (d. 1896)
- November 13 – Emilia Plater, Polish heroine (d. 1831)
- December 11 – Otto Wilhelm Hermann von Abich, German geologist (d. 1886)

== Deaths ==
=== January–June ===
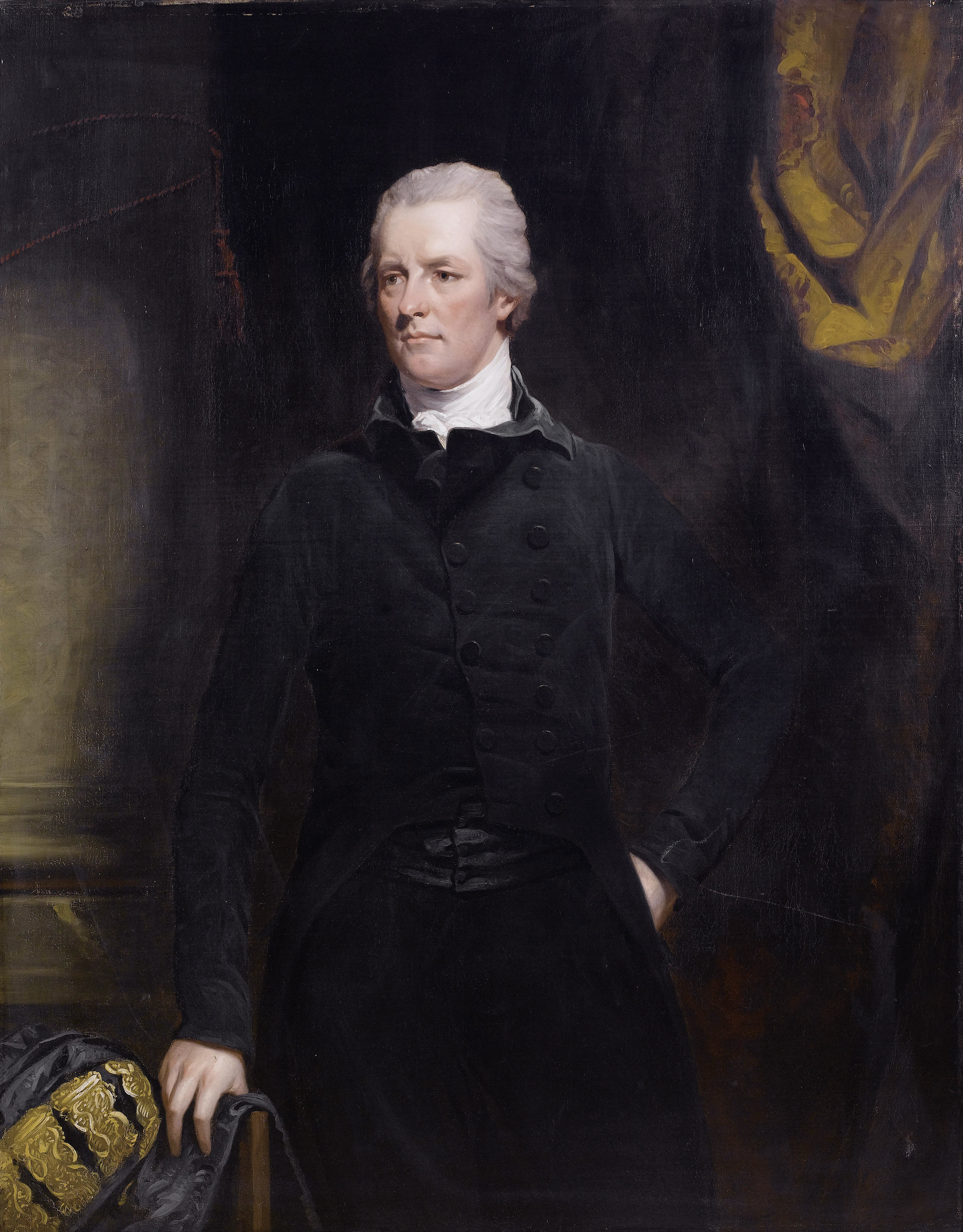
William Pitt the Younger

- January 8 – Magdalena Dávalos y Maldonado, Ecuadorian scholar, socialite (b. 1725)
- January 23 – William Pitt the Younger, Prime Minister of the United Kingdom (b. 1759)
- February 2 – Nicolas Restif de la Bretonne, French writer (b. 1734)
- February 16 – Franz von Weyrother, Austrian general (b. 1755)
- February 19 – Elizabeth Carter, English writer (b. 1717)
- February 20 – Lachlan McIntosh, Scottish-born American military and political leader (b. 1725)
- March 20 – Salomea Deszner, Polish actress, singer and theater director (b. 1759)
- March 30 – Georgiana Cavendish, Duchess of Devonshire, English noblewoman, socialite, political organizer, style icon, author and activist (b. 1757)
- April 9 – William V, Prince of Orange, last Stadtholder of the Dutch Republic (b. 1748)
- April 10 – Horatio Gates, British soldier, served as an American general during the American Revolutionary War (b. 1727)
- April 22 – Pierre-Charles Villeneuve, French admiral (stabbed) (b. 1763)
- May 9 – Robert Morris, English-born merchant, one of the Founding Fathers of the United States, "financier of the American Revolution" (b. 1734)
- May 24 – John Campbell, 5th Duke of Argyll, British field marshal (b. 1723)
- June 23 – Mathurin Jacques Brisson, French naturalist (b. 1723)

=== July–December ===
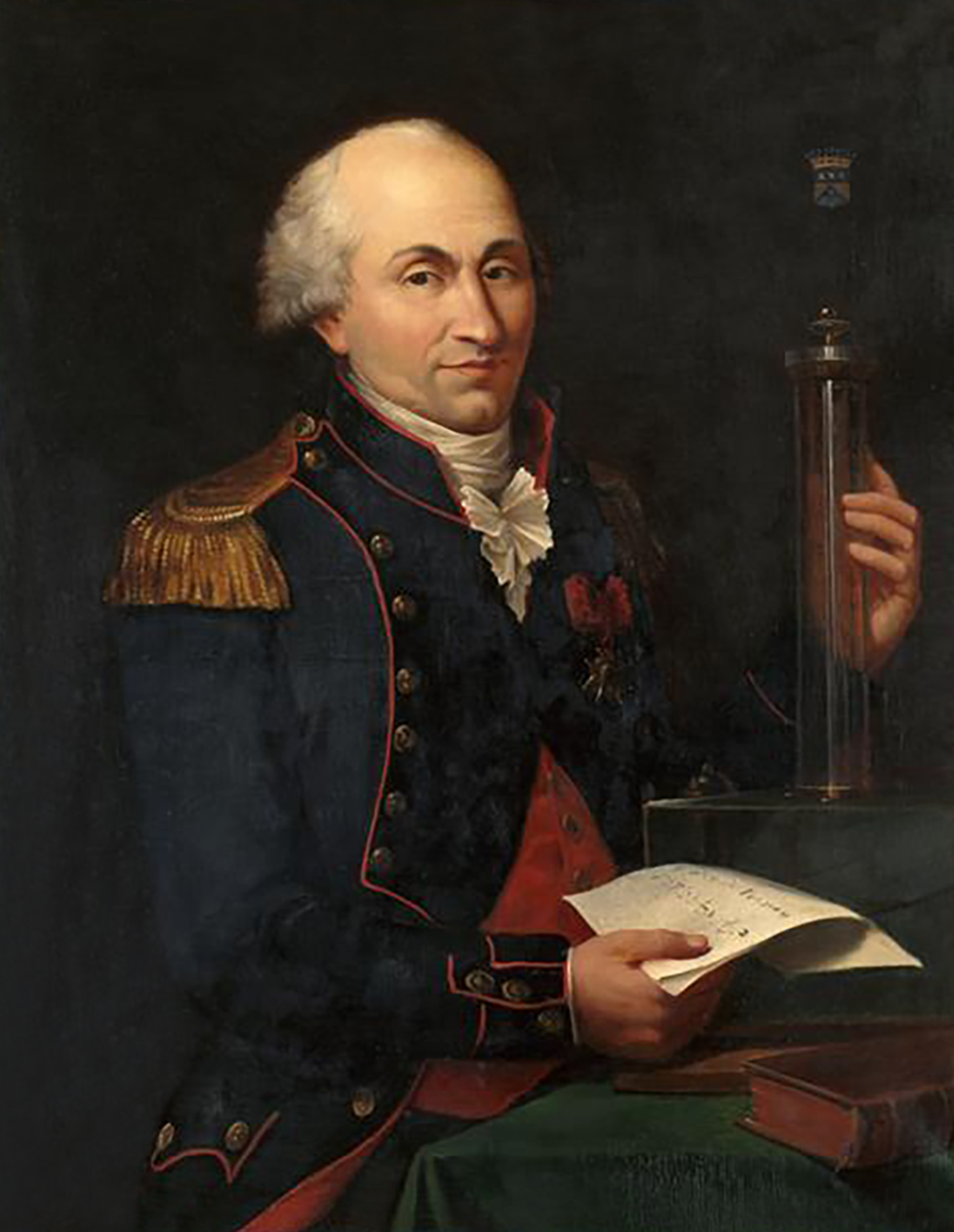
Charles-Augustin de Coulomb

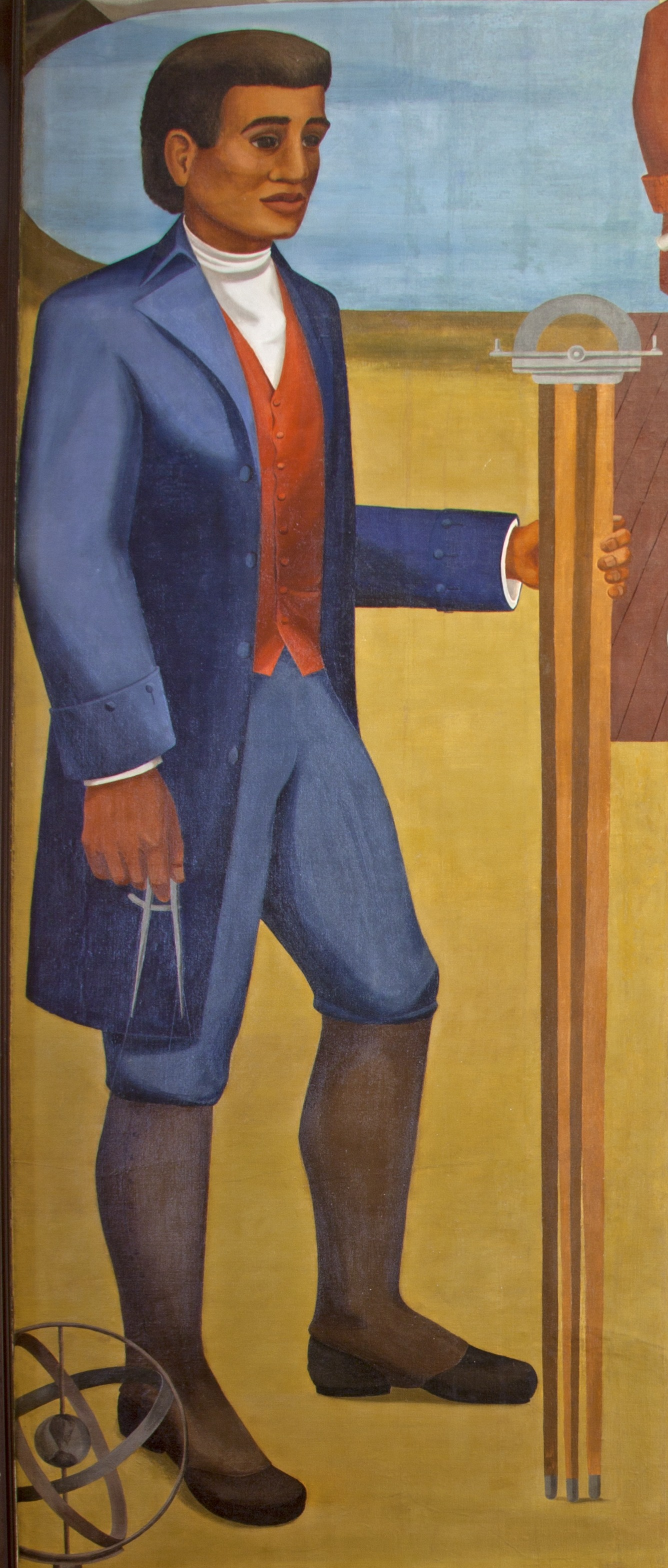
Benjamin Banneker

- July 4 – Charles Henri Sanson, Royal Executioner of France during the reign of King Louis XVI (b. 1739)
- July 10 – George Stubbs, English animal painter (b. 1724)
- July 11 – James Smith, Irish-born American lawyer and politician, signer of the United States Declaration of Independence (b. 1719)
- July 16 – Johann Gottfried Arnold, German cellist (lung infection) (b. 1773)
- August 10 – Michael Haydn, Austrian composer and brother of Joseph Haydn (b. 1737)
- August 22 – Jean-Honoré Fragonard, French painter (b. 1742)
- August 23 – Charles-Augustin de Coulomb, French physicist (b. 1736)
- September 9 – William Paterson, Irish-born American judge, signer of the United States Constitution, Governor of New Jersey (b. 1745)
- September 13 – Charles James Fox, English politician (b. 1749)
- September 30 – William Fortescue, 1st Earl of Clermont, Irish politician (b. 1722)
- October 9 – Benjamin Banneker, American astronomer and surveyor (b. 1731)
- October 10 – Louis Ferdinand of Prussia, German prince (killed in battle) (b. 1772)
- October 25 – Henry Knox, Secretary of War under George Washington (b. 1750)
- October 26 – John Graves Simcoe, English army officer and colonial administrator, first Lieutenant-Governor of Upper Canada (b. 1752)
- November 10 – Karl Wilhelm Ferdinand, Duke of Brunswick, German ruling prince and general (died of wounds) (b. 1735)
- November 23 – Roger Newdigate, English politician (b. 1719)
- December 9 – Josef Georg Hörl, Austrian politician (b. 1722)

=== Date unknown ===
- Mungo Park, Scottish explorer (drowned in attack) (b. 1771)
