= 1805 =

1805 in various calendars
- Gregorian calendar: 1805; MDCCCV
- French Republican calendar: 13–14; XIII–XIV
- Ab urbe condita: 2558
- Armenian calendar: 1254; ԹՎ ՌՄԾԴ
- Assyrian calendar: 6555
- Balinese saka calendar: 1726–1727
- Bengali calendar: 1211–1212
- Berber calendar: 2755
- British Regnal year: 45 Geo. 3 – 46 Geo. 3
- Buddhist calendar: 2349
- Burmese calendar: 1167
- Byzantine calendar: 7313–7314
- Chinese calendar: 甲子年 (Wood Rat); 4502 or 4295 — to — 乙丑年 (Wood Ox); 4503 or 4296
- Coptic calendar: 1521–1522
- Discordian calendar: 2971
- Ethiopian calendar: 1797–1798
- Hebrew calendar: 5565–5566
- Hindu calendars
- Vikram Samvat: 1861–1862
- Shaka Samvat: 1726–1727
- Kali Yuga: 4905–4906
- Holocene calendar: 11805
- Igbo calendar: 805–806
- Iranian calendar: 1183–1184
- Islamic calendar: 1219–1220
- Japanese calendar: Bunka 2 (文化２年)
- Javanese calendar: 1731–1732
- Julian calendar: Gregorian minus 12 days
- Korean calendar: 4138
- Minguo calendar: 107 before ROC 民前107年
- Nanakshahi calendar: 337
- Thai solar calendar: 2347–2348
- Tibetan calendar: ཤིང་ཕོ་བྱི་བ་ལོ་ (male Wood-Rat); 1931 or 1550 or 778 — to — ཤིང་མོ་གླང་ལོ་ (female Wood-Ox); 1932 or 1551 or 779

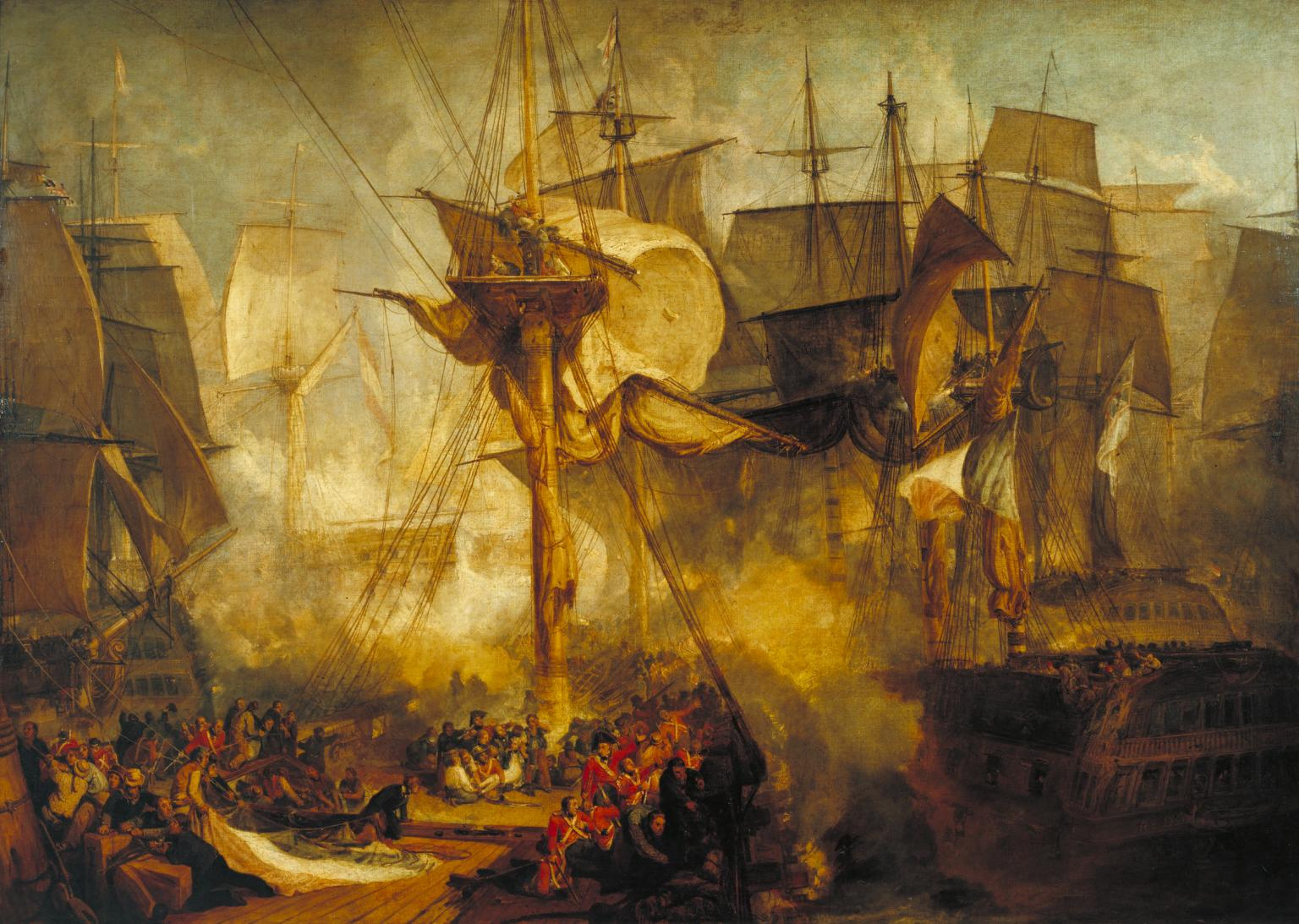
October 21: Battle of Trafalgar

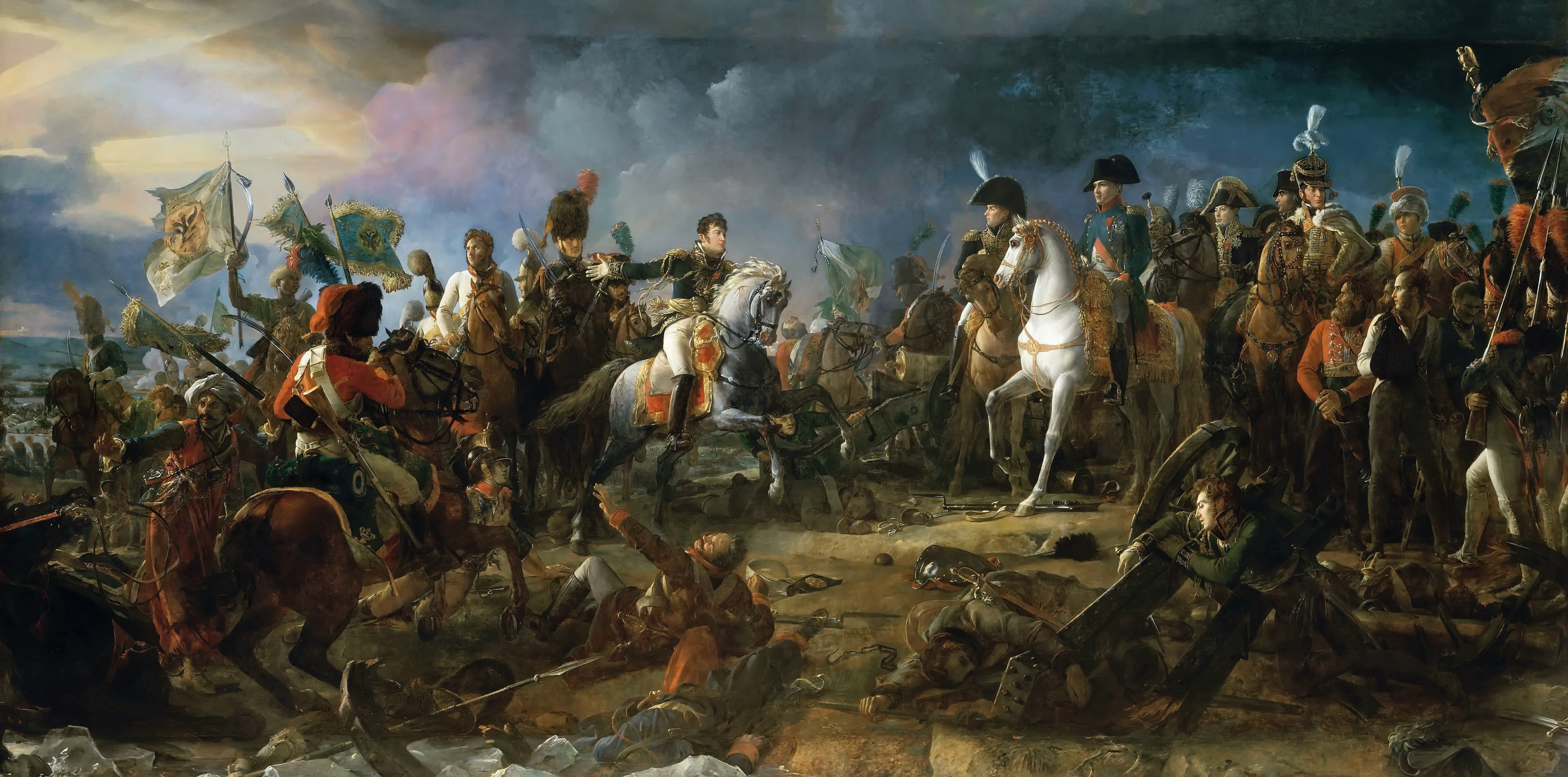
December 2: Battle of Austerlitz

1805 (MDCCCV) was a common year starting on Tuesday of the Gregorian calendar and a common year starting on Sunday of the Julian calendar, the 1805th year of the Common Era (CE) and Anno Domini (AD) designations, the 805th year of the 2nd millennium, the 5th year of the 19th century, and the 6th year of the 1800s decade. As of the start of 1805, the Gregorian calendar was 12 days ahead of the Julian calendar, which remained in localized use until 1923.

After thirteen years the First French Empire abolished the French Republican Calendar in favour of the Gregorian calendar.

== Events ==
=== January–March ===
- January 11 – The Michigan Territory is created.
- February 7 – King Anouvong becomes ruler of Vientiane on the death of his brother Inthavong.
- February 15 – The Harmony Society is officially formed as a Christian community in Harmony, Pennsylvania.
- March 1 – Justice Samuel Chase is acquitted of impeachment charges by the United States Senate.
- March 5 – The New Brunswick Legislature passes a bill to advance literacy in the province, which eventually leads to the creation of public education in Canada.

=== April–June ===
- April 7 – Beethoven's Symphony No. 3, Eroica, has its public premiere at the Theater an der Wien in Vienna under his baton.
- April 27 – Battle of Derne: United States Marines and Berbers attack the Tripolitan city of Derna (the Shores of Tripoli).
- April 29 – Rutger Jan Schimmelpenninck is appointed as Grand Pensionary of the Batavian Republic by Napoleon.
- May 26 – Napoleon is crowned King of Italy.
- May 31–June 2 – Napoleonic Wars: Battle of Diamond Rock – A Franco-Spanish fleet captures the strategic island of Diamond Rock off Martinique in the West Indies, from the British.
- June 1 – Tuscan-born composer Luigi Boccherini is buried in the Basílica pontificia de San Miguel in Madrid after being found dead on May 28.
- June 4
  - The First Barbary War ends between Tripoli and the United States of America.
  - The first Trooping the Colour ceremony is held at the Horse Guards Parade in London.
- June 11 - Detroit burns to the ground; most of the city is destroyed.
- June 13 – Lewis and Clark Expedition in the United States: Scouting ahead of the expedition, Meriwether Lewis and four companions sight the Great Falls of the Missouri River, confirming they are heading in the right direction.

=== July–September ===
- July 9 – Muhammad Ali Pasha founds his dynasty in Egypt.
- July 26 – 1805 Molise earthquake: 5,573 people in Molise and Campania, Italy, are killed.
- August 12 – Lewis and Clark Expedition: U.S. Army Captain Meriwether Lewis reaches the Continental Divide of the Americas, crossing to the west at Lemhi Pass.
- August 25 – Treaty of Bogenhausen is concluded between France and Bavaria forming a military alliance
- August 27 – Napoleon orders the Grande Armée ("The Great Army") of some 165,000 men to march to the Rhine River to deal with the Austrian and Russian threats on the frontier. The French army is organized into seven corps and is supported by 36–40 cannons each. Napoleon orders Marshal Joachim Murat with his I Cavalry Corps (some 20,000 men), to make feint attacks through the Black Forest in south-west Germany.
- August 29 – Emperor Franz I of Austria and his council of ministers vote in favor of going to war with France.
- August 31 – British Army General David Baird departs from Cork, leading an expedition to capture the Cape of Good Hope. Their ship arrives on January 4.
- September 21 – King Ferdinand of Naples signs a treaty in Paris agreeing to keep Naples neutral during the war between France and the allied powers.
- September 29 – Admiral Nelson of the British Royal Navy takes command of the fleet off the coast of Cádiz, in order to counteract the navies of France and Spain.

=== October–December ===
- October 14 – Napoleonic Wars: War of the Third Coalition – Ulm Campaign: Battle of Elchingen – An Austrian corps under Johann von Riesch is defeated by Marshal Ney, near Elchingen, Bavaria.
- October 16–October 19 – War of the Third Coalition: Ulm Campaign – Battle of Ulm: Austrian General Mack von Leiberich is forced to surrender his entire army to Napoleon, after being surrounded.
- October 21 – Napoleonic Wars: War of the Third Coalition – Battle of Trafalgar: The British fleet, led by Admiral Horatio Nelson, 1st Viscount Nelson, defeated a combined French and Spanish fleet off the coast of Spain; however, Admiral Nelson is fatally shot.
- October 23
  - On the early death of her husband, Madame Clicquot Ponsardin takes over his champagne wine business in France as Veuve Clicquot.
  - British troopship Aeneas is wrecked off Newfoundland with the loss of 340 lives.
- October 31 – Sweden, led by King Gustav IV Adolf, declares war on France.
- November 7 – The Lewis and Clark Expedition arrives at the Pacific Ocean.
- November 11 – Napoleonic Wars: Battle of Dürenstein – 8,000 French troops attempt to slow the retreat of a vastly superior Russian and Austrian force.
- November 16 – Napoleonic Wars: Battle of Schöngrabern – Russian forces, under Pyotr Bagration, delay the pursuit by French troops under Joachim Murat.
- November 20 – Beethoven's only opera Fidelio, in its original form (known retrospectively as Leonore), is premiered at the Theater an der Wien in Vienna, which at this time is under French military occupation.
- November 26 – The Pontcysyllte Aqueduct is opened in Wales; it is 1,007 ft (307 m) long and 126 ft (38 m) tall.
- December 2 – Napoleonic Wars: Battle of Austerlitz – French troops under Napoleon decisively defeat a joint Russo-Austrian force.
- December 26 – The Peace of Pressburg between France and Austria is signed in the Primate's Palace, Pressburg (modern-day Bratislava).
- December 31 – The French Republican Calendar (which featured a 10-day week until 1802) is used for the last time, 8 days after being annulled by Napoleon, with the final official date being "9 Nivôse in Year XIV of the Revolution".

=== Date unknown ===
- James Squire becomes the first brewer in Australia to cultivate hops.
- The Old Man of the Mountain, a natural rock formation in the U.S. state of New Hampshire, is first mentioned by two workmen, Francis Whitcomb and Luke Brooks.
- Napoleon orders his soldiers to be vaccinated.

== Births ==
=== January–June ===
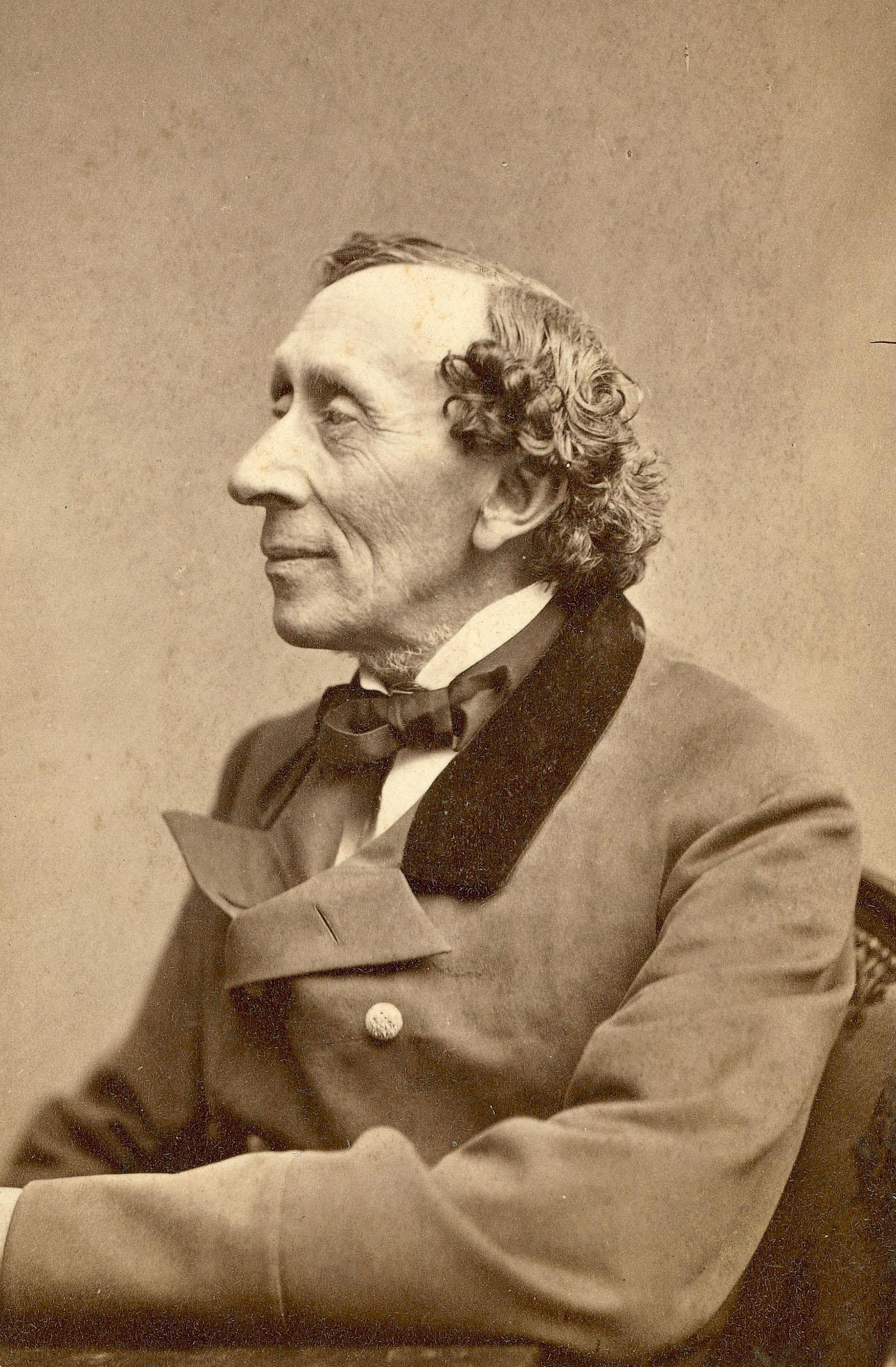
Hans Christian Andersen

- January 8 – Orson Hyde, American religious leader (d. 1878)
- January 27 – Samuel Palmer, English artist (d. 1881)
- February 13 – Peter Gustav Lejeune Dirichlet, German mathematician (d. 1859)
- February 18 – Louis M. Goldsborough, United States Navy admiral (d. 1877)
- March 3 – Jonas Furrer, first President of the Swiss Confederation (d. 1861)
- March 14 – Eduard Clam-Gallas, Austrian general (d. 1891)
- March 22 – Benito de Soto, Galician pirate (executed 1830)
- March 23 – Sears Cook Walker, American mathematician, astronomer (d. 1853)
- March 26 (alleged) – Shirali Muslimov, Azerbaijani supercentenarian (d. 1973)
- April 2 – Hans Christian Andersen, Danish writer (d. 1875)
- April 8 – Hugo von Mohl, German botanist (d. 1872)
- April 21 – James Martineau, English religious philosopher (d. 1900)
- April 22 – Benito de Soto, Galician pirate (d. 1830)
- June 9 – José Trinidad Cabañas, Honduran general, president and national hero (d. 1871)
- June 22 – Giuseppe Mazzini Italian patriot, statesman and writer (d. 1872)

=== July–December ===
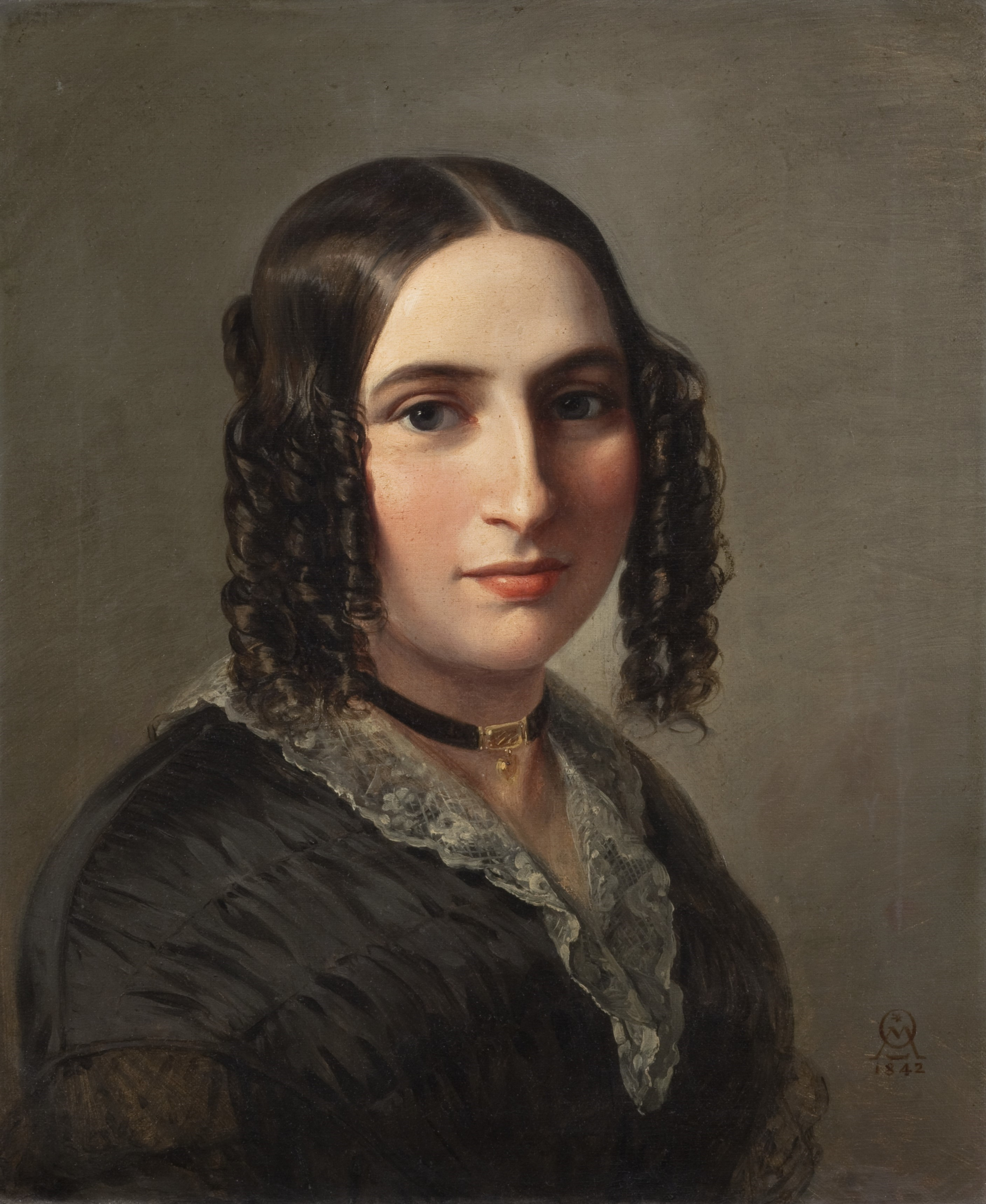
Fanny Hensel

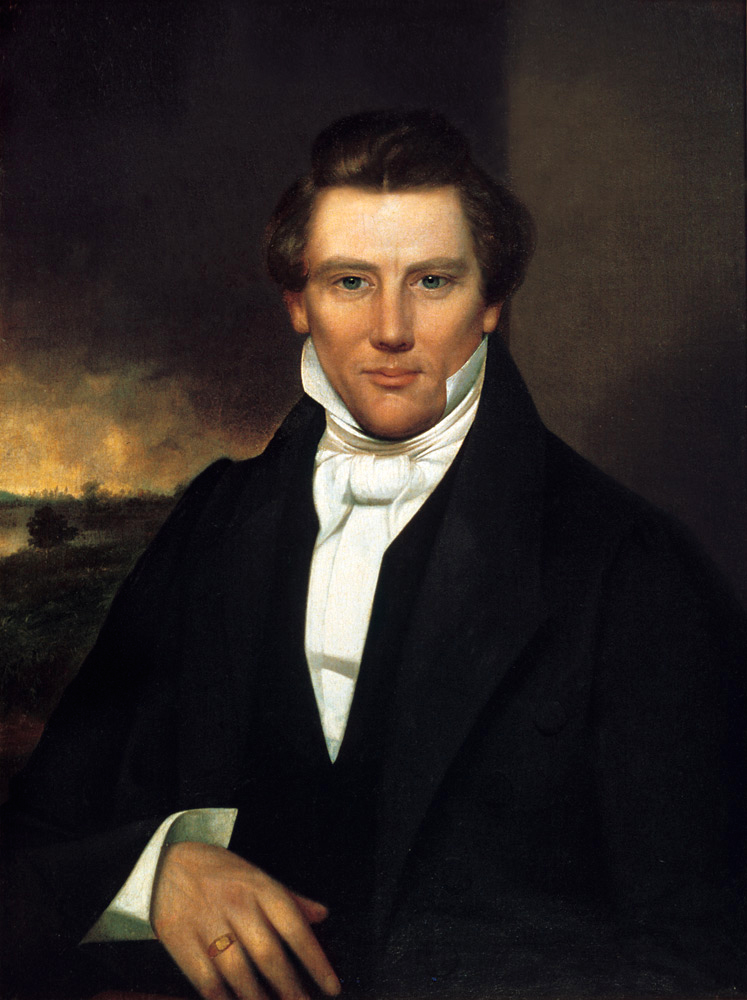
Joseph Smith

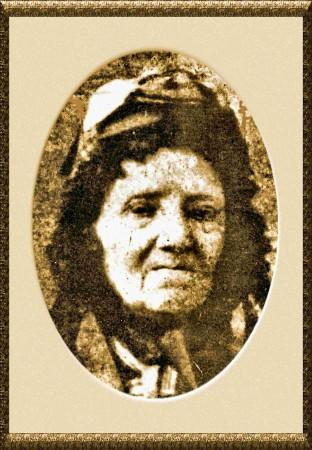
Jeanne Deroin

- July 5 – Robert FitzRoy, English meteorologist, captain and politician (d. 1865)
- July 29 – Alexis de Tocqueville, French historian (d. 1859)
- July 30 – Rudolf Wagner, German anatomist, pathologist (d. 1864)
- August 4 – William Rowan Hamilton, Irish physicist (d. 1865)
- September 19 – John Stevens Cabot Abbott, American historian, pastor and pedagogical writer (d. 1877)
- September 27 – George Müller, Prussian evangelist, founder of the New Orphan Houses, Ashley Down, Bristol in England (d. 1898)
- November 14 – Fanny Hensel, German composer, pianist (d. 1847)
- November 28 – John Lloyd Stephens, American traveler, diplomat and Mayanist archaeologist (d. 1852)
- December 2 – Cicero Price, American commodore (d. 1888)
- December 10 – William Lloyd Garrison, American abolitionist (d. 1879)
- December 12 – Henry Wells, American businessman, founder of Wells Fargo (d. 1878)
- December 22 – John Obadiah Westwood, English entomologist (d. 1893)
- December 23 – Joseph Smith, American religious leader, founder of the Latter Day Saint movement (d. 1844)
- December 31 – Jeanne Deroin, French socialist and feminist (d. 1894)

=== Undated ===
- Maiden of Ludmir, Jewish religious leader (d. 1888)
- James Pratt, last of two men to be executed in UK for homosexuality (d. 1835)
- Cochise, Indigenous American (Apache) leader (d. 1874)
- Jesse Chisholm, Indigenous American (Cherokee) fur trader and merchant (d. 1868)
- Ba huyen Thanh Quan, a female Vietnamese poet.

== Deaths ==
=== January–June ===
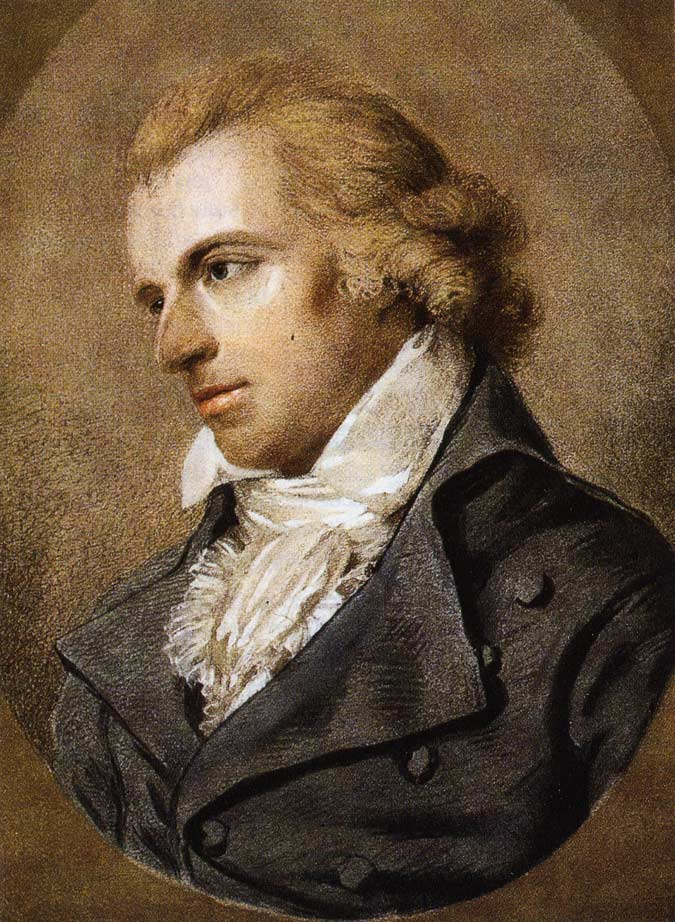
Friedrich Schiller

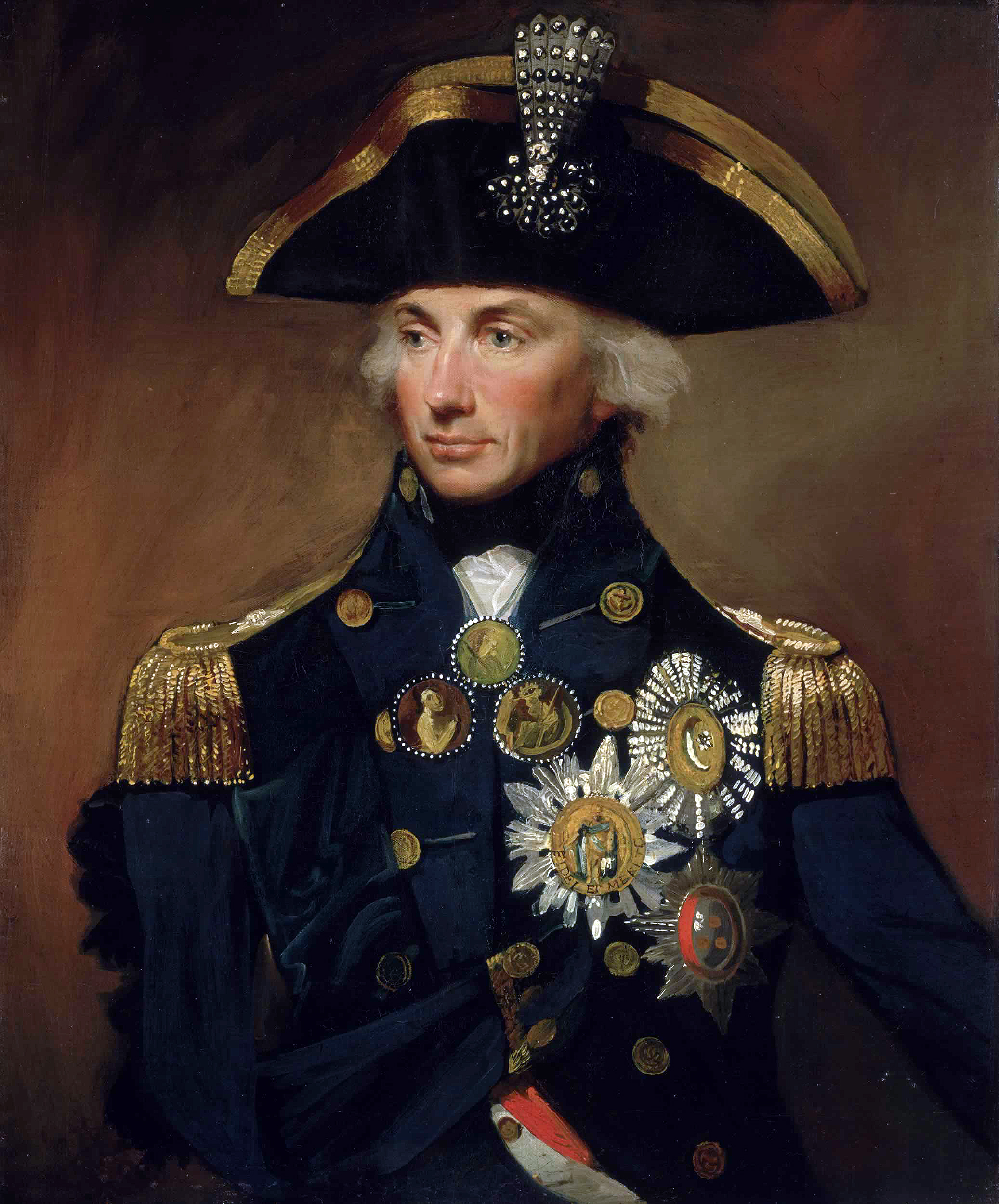
Lord Nelson

- January 7 – Ebenezer Sproat, American Continental Army officer, pioneer to the Ohio Country (b. 1752)
- January 9 – Noble Wimberly Jones, American Continental Congressman (b. 1723)
- January 17 – Paschen von Cossel, German lawyer (b. 1714)
- January 18 – John Moore (archbishop of Canterbury) (b. 1730)
- January 23 – Claude Chappe, French telecommunication pioneer (b. 1763)
- January 24 – Liu Yong, Chinese politician (b. 1719)
- February 2 – Thomas Banks, English sculptor and artist (b. 1735)
- February 11 – Queen Jeongsun, Korean regent (b. 1745)
- February 20 – Justus Claproth, German jurist, inventor of the de-inking process of recycled paper (b. 1728)
- February 25 – Thomas Pownall, English colonial statesman (b. 1722)
- March 4 – Jean-Baptiste Greuze, French painter (b. 1725)
- March 14 – Ji Yun, Chinese politician (b. 1724)
- May 7 – William Petty, 2nd Earl of Shelburne, Prime Minister of Great Britain (b. 1737)
- May 9 – Friedrich Schiller, German playwright (b. 1759)
- May 12 – Ferdinand von Hompesch zu Bolheim, 71st Grandmaster of the Order of Malta (b. 1744)
- May 25
  - William Paley, English philosopher (b. 1743)
  - Anna Maria Rückerschöld, Swedish author (b. 1725)
- May 28 – Luigi Boccherini, Tuscan-born composer (b. 1743)
- June 3 – Princess Louise of Saxe-Meiningen, Landgravine of Hesse-Philippsthal-Barchfeld (b. 1752)
- June 18 – Arthur Murphy, Irish writer (b. 1727)
- June 19 – Louis-Jean-François Lagrenée, French painter (b. 1724)

=== July–December ===
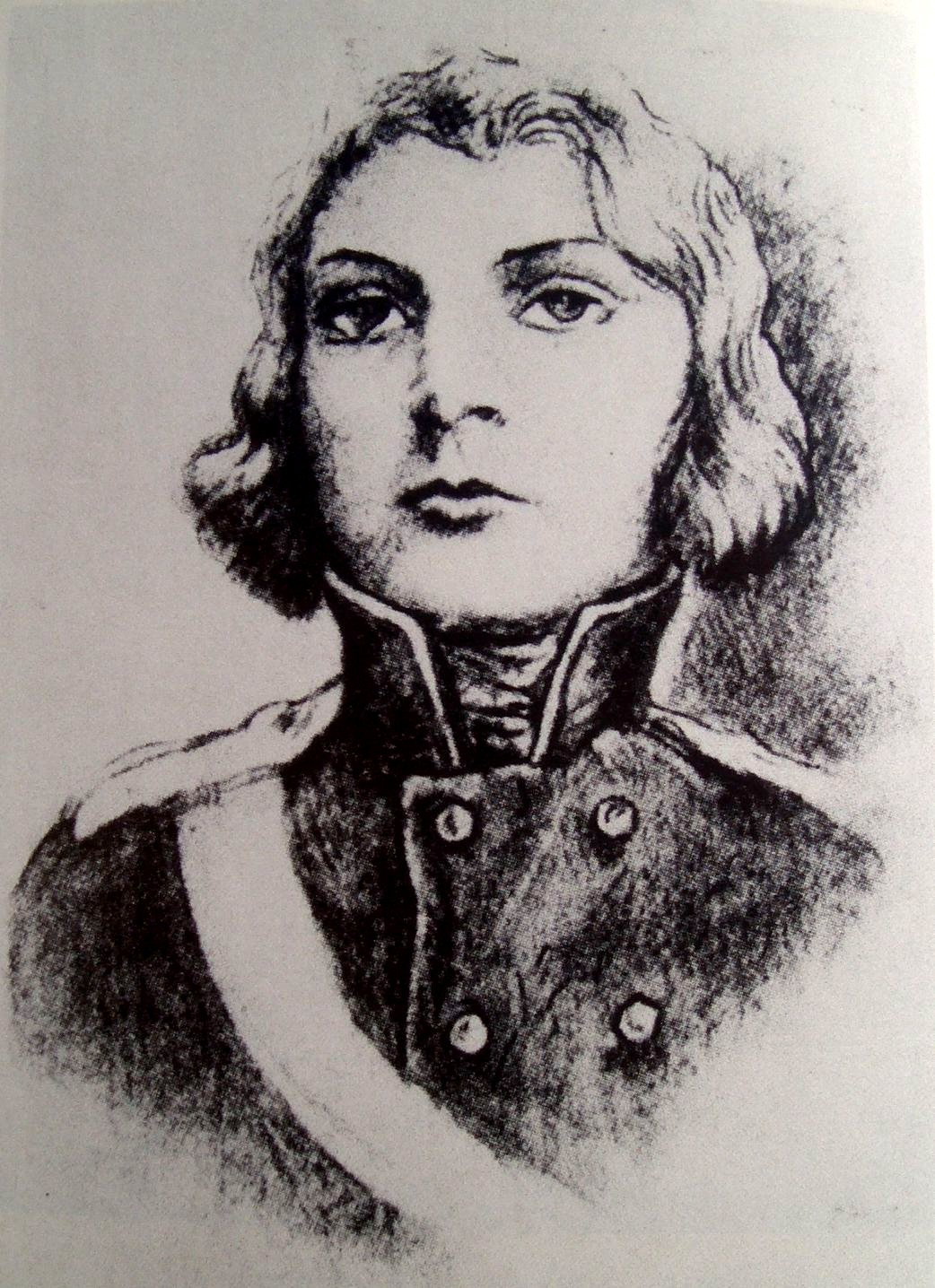
Eleonore Prochaska

- July 31 – Dheeran Chinnamalai, Tamil king (b. 1756)
- August 3 – Christopher Anstey, English writer (b. 1724)
- August 28
  - Alexander Carlyle, Scottish church leader (b. 1722)
  - Christopher Gadsden, American statesman (b. 1724)
- September 27 – William Moultrie, American general (b. 1730)
- September 28 – Christoph Franz von Buseck, Prince-Bishop of Bamberg (b. 1724)
- October 5
  - Charles Cornwallis, 1st Marquess Cornwallis, British general (b. 1738)
  - Eleonore Prochaska, German heroine soldier (b. 1785)
- October 21
  - John Cooke, English captain (b. 1762)
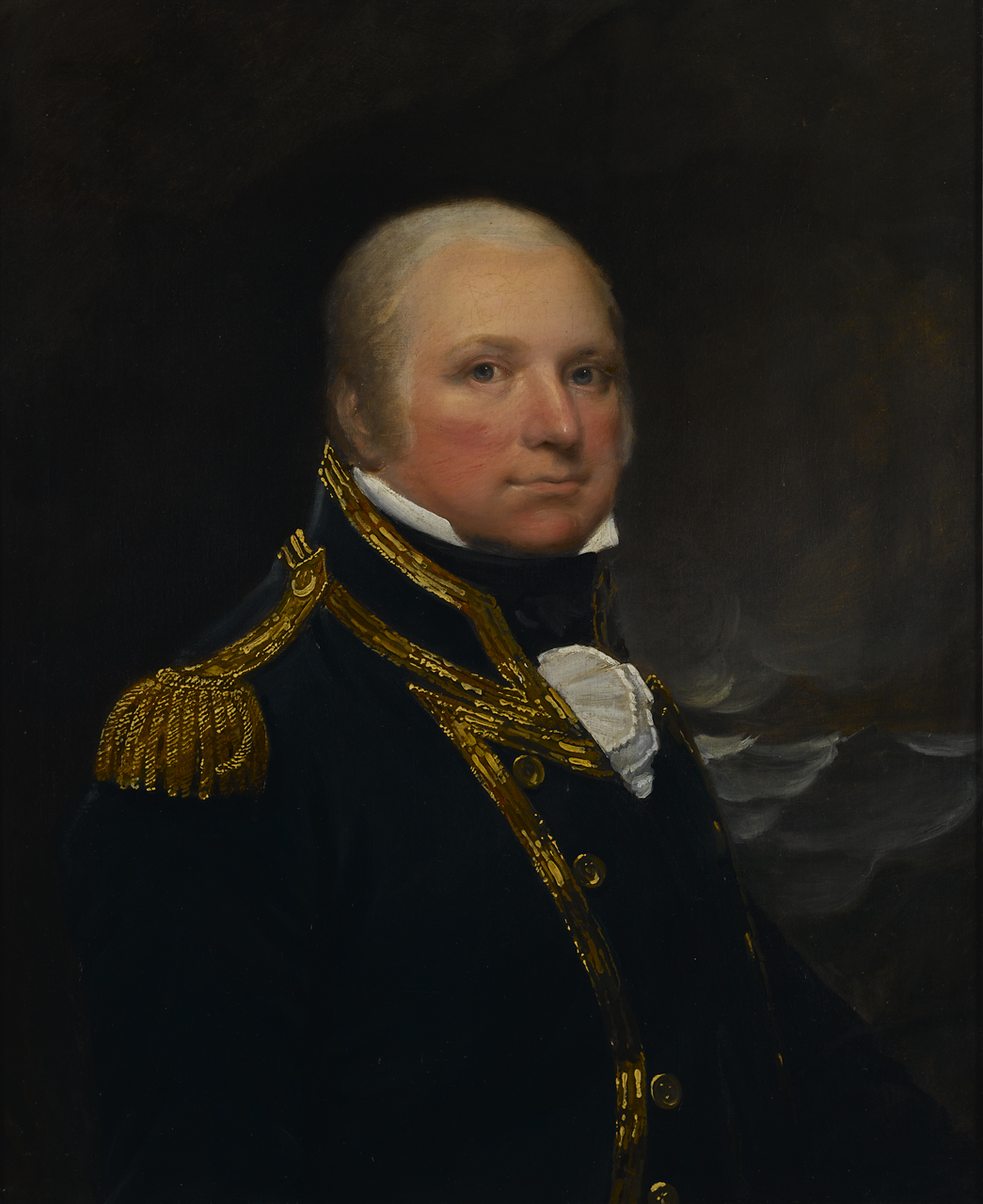
    John Cooke
  - Horatio Nelson, 1st Viscount Nelson, British admiral (mortally wounded in battle) (b. 1758)
- November 24 – Jacques Antoine Marie de Cazalès, French orator, politician (b. 1758)
- December 16 – Saverio Cassar, Gozitan priest, rebel leader (b. 1746)
- December 23
  - Pehr Osbeck, Swedish explorer, naturalist (b. 1723)
  - Geneviève Thiroux d'Arconville, French novelist, translator and chemist (b. 1720)

=== Undated ===
- Rafaela Herrera, Nicaraguan heroine (b. 1742)
- Bety of Betsimisaraka, queen regnant (b. 1735)
