= 1800s (decade) =

Decade

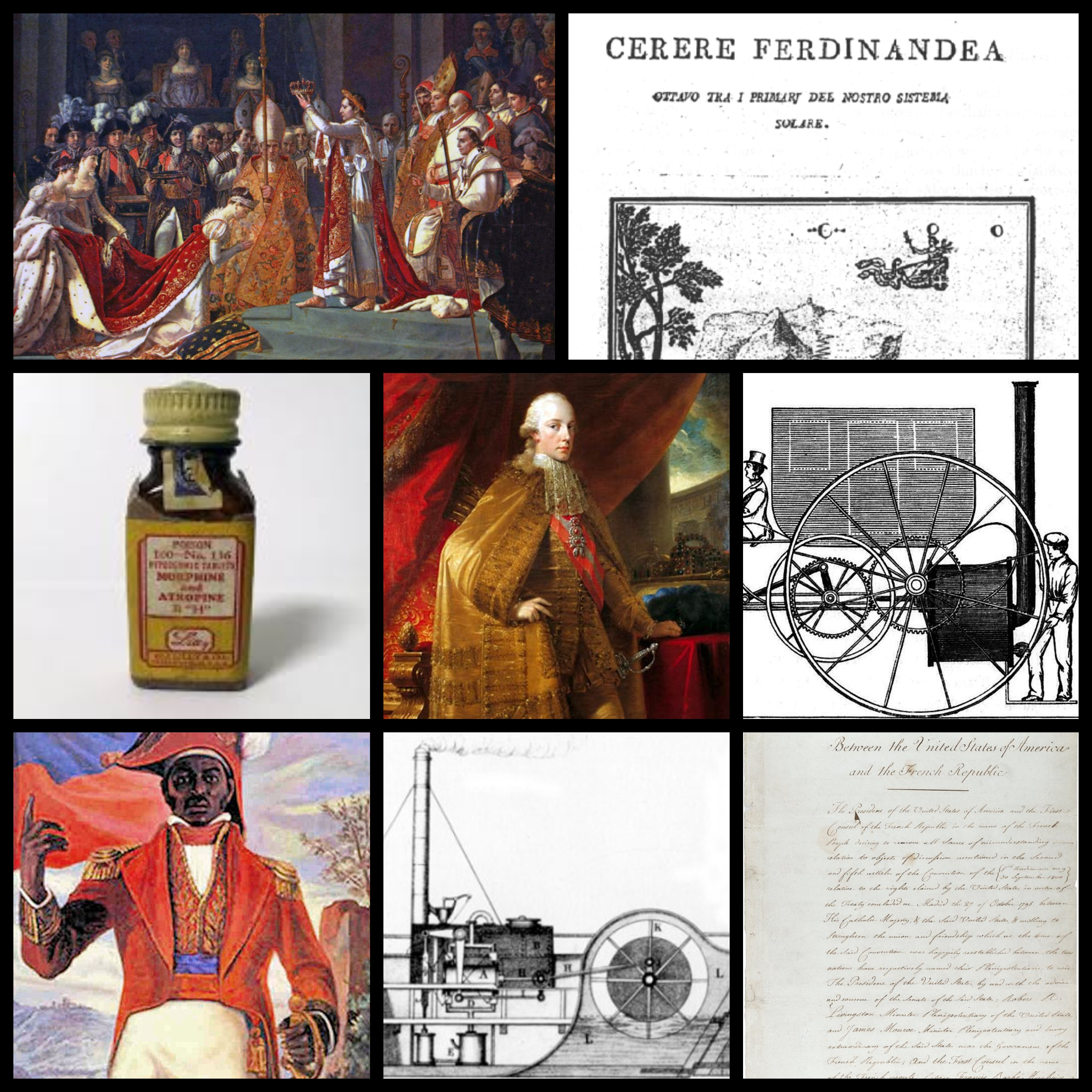
From top left, clockwise: Napoleon Bonaparte is crowned Emperor of the French Empire and embarked on trans-European conquests, which would later on be best known as the Napoleonic Wars – a conflict that forever transformed European politics, and gave rise to the global struggle for hegemony; Ceres was discovered, proving the existence of an asteroid belt between the Solar System's inner and outer planets; Inventor Isaac de Rivas created a hydrogen gas-powered vehicle, an inception to automotive engineering and internal combustion engines; - The Louisiana Purchase was made, singlehandedly expanding the United States of America in a scale larger than ever; to this day the purchase is still viewed as one of the largest expansions within North America to date; Symington's Charlotte Dundas became the world's first functioning steamboat; Haiti declares independence in 1804, becoming the first independent Caribbean state, with its victory marking the world's arguably only successful slave revolution in history; Morphine is successfully isolated from opium and is produced for the first time as a separate medicinal product in 1804; Francis II abdicates in 1806, thus dissolving the Holy Roman Empire.

The 1800s (pronounced "eighteen-hundreds") was a decade of the Gregorian calendar that began on 1 January 1800, and ended on 31 December 1809.

The term "eighteen-hundreds" could also mean the entire century from 1 January 1800 to 31 December 1899 (the years beginning with "18"), and is almost synonymous with the 19th century (1801–1900).

The decade was a period of drastic change. The advancements of the previous three decades towards the end of the 18th century had propelled the Industrial Revolution into a global movement, with entire wars fought with the newly developed technologies – creating an impetus to imperialist campaigns across Africa and Asia, as well as the counter-movement on Latin America later on.

== Politics and wars ==
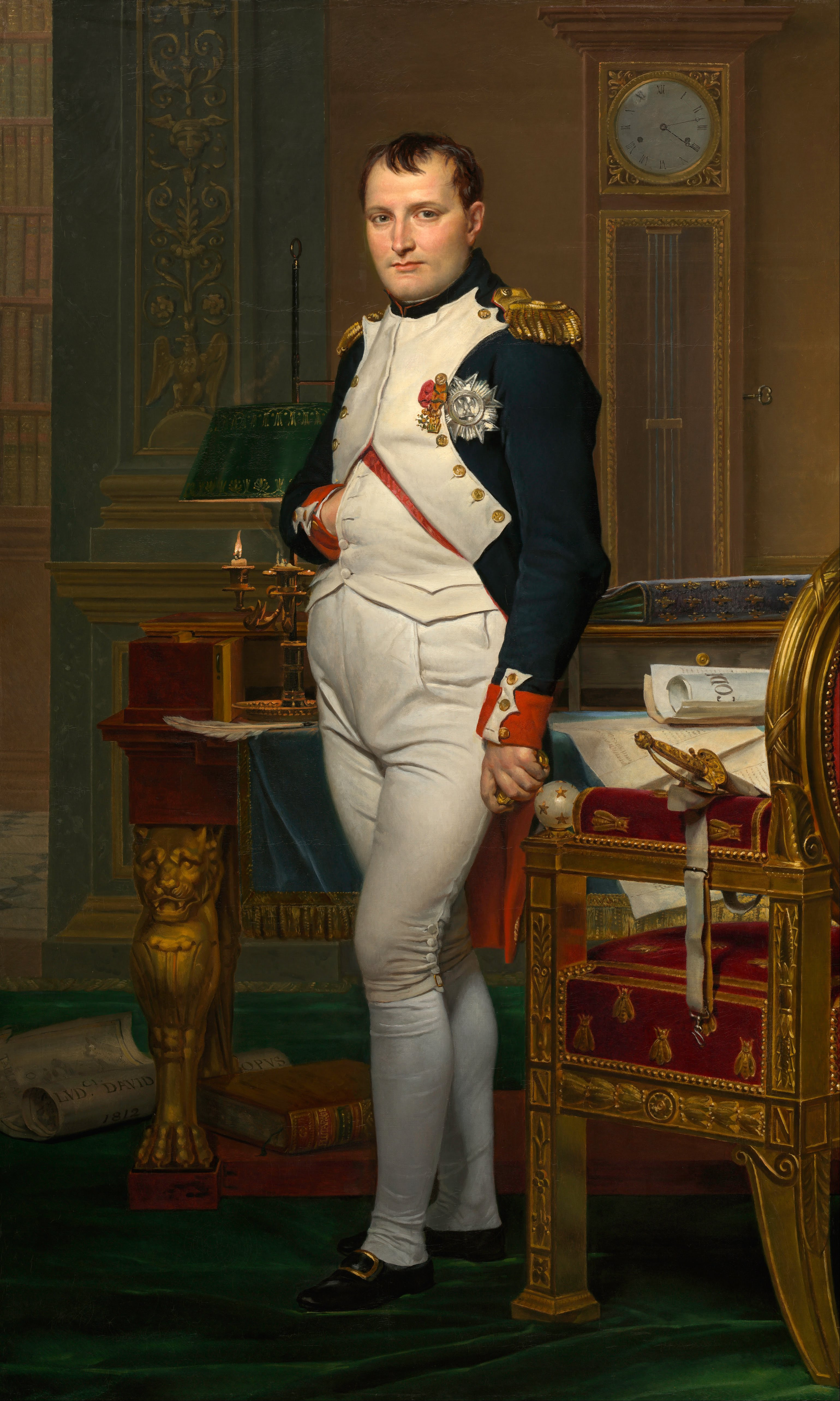
The early 1800s saw the rise of Napoleon Bonaparte, who led the French Army to conquer a substantial portion of Europe during this time.

=== Napoleonic Wars ===
The European political landscape was dominated by the Napoleonic Wars, a series of conflicts declared against Napoleon's First French Empire and changing sets of European allies by opposing coalitions that ran from 1803 to 1815. As a continuation of the wars sparked by the French Revolution of 1789, they revolutionized European armies and played out on an unprecedented scale, mainly due to the application of modern mass conscription. French power rose quickly, conquering most of Europe by the end of the decade. The decade brought hard times.

On 9 November 1799 (18 Brumaire), Napoleon overthrew the French government, replacing it with the Consulate, in which he was First Consul. On 2 December 1804, after a failed assassination plot, he crowned himself Emperor. In 1805, Napoleon planned to invade Britain, but a renewed British alliance with Russia and Austria (Third Coalition), forced him to turn his attention towards the continent, while at the same time failure to lure the superior British fleet away from the English Channel, ending in a decisive French defeat at the Battle of Trafalgar (in this battle, British Admiral Horatio Nelson was fatally wounded) on 21 October put an end to hopes of an invasion of Britain. On 2 December 1805, Napoleon defeated a numerically superior Austro-Russian army at Austerlitz, forcing Austria's withdrawal from the coalition (see Treaty of Pressburg) and dissolving the Holy Roman Empire. In 1806, a Fourth Coalition was set up, on 14 October Napoleon defeated the Prussians at the Battle of Jena-Auerstedt, marched through Germany and defeated the Russians on 14 June 1807 at Friedland. The Treaties of Tilsit divided Europe between France and Russia and created the Duchy of Warsaw.

The War of the Fifth Coalition, fought in the year 1809, pitted a coalition of the Austrian Empire and the United Kingdom against the French Empire and Bavaria. Major engagements between France and Austria, the main participants, unfolded over much of Central Europe from April to July, with very high casualty rates. Britain, already involved on the European continent in the ongoing Peninsular War, sent another expedition, the Walcheren Campaign, to the Netherlands in order to relieve the Austrians, although this effort had little impact on the outcome of the conflict. After much campaigning in Bavaria and across the Danube valley, the war ended favorably for the French after the bloody struggle at Wagram in early July, resulting in the Treaty of Schönbrunn . Although fighting in the Iberian Peninsula continued, the War of the Fifth Coalition was the last major conflict on the European continent until the French invasion of Russia in 1812 sparked the Sixth Coalition.

=== Other wars and political upheavals ===
- End of the White Lotus Rebellion (1796–1804), an uprising against the Qing dynasty in China.
- Beginning of the Russo-Turkish War (1806–1812) between Russia and the Ottoman Empire.
- The First Barbary War (1801–1805) is fought between the United States and the Barbary States of North Africa.
- End of the Quasi-War (1800).
- The Second Anglo-Maratha War (1803–1805) is fought between the Maratha Peshwa on one side and minor chieftains of the Maratha Confederacy Sindhia, Bhonsle and Holkar on the other resulting in a crushing defeat of the rebel chieftains and the breakup of the Maratha confederacy.
- The Fulani War (1804–1810) is fought in present-day Nigeria and Cameroon.
- The First Serbian Uprising (1804−1813) marks the first time in 300 years Serbia perceives itself an independent state.
- Haiti gains independence from France on 1 January 1804.
- Irish Republican, orator, and rebel leader Robert Emmet leads a rebellion in Dublin, Ireland on 23 July 1803 but the rebellion is crushed and Emmet is captured and later executed on 20 September 1803.

=== Slavery ===
This decade marked the greatest increase of the Atlantic slave trade to the United States. During the period of 1798 and 1808, approximately 200,000 slaves were imported from Africa to the United States. Still, the abolitionist movement began to gain ground in this period. Britain enacted the Slave Trade Act 1807, which barred the trade of slaves in Great Britain (though slavery was still legal). The United States enacted a similar ban in 1808. However, Napoleon revoked the French Empire's ban on slavery with the Law of 20 May 1802.

On 30 August 1800, under the cloak of religious meetings, Gabriel Prosser and Jack Bowler planned a slave rebellion in Richmond, Virginia. The rebellion was postponed due to poor weather and was ultimately unsuccessful because of unnamed two slaves betraying the cause.

=== Prominent political events ===
- 1800
  - The unfinished White House (at the time known as the "Executive Mansion") housed its first president, President John Adams, on 1 November 1800.
- 1801
  - Under the District of Columbia Organic Act of 1801, Washington, D.C., a new planned city and capital of the United States, was placed under the jurisdiction of the U.S. Congress.
  - The Kingdom of Great Britain and the Kingdom of Ireland merge into the United Kingdom of Great Britain and Ireland in 1801.
- 1803
  - United States doubles its size with territories gained from Napoleon Bonaparte in the Louisiana Purchase.
  - The United States Supreme Court rules in Marbury v. Madison, giving themselves the ability of judicial review, and substantially expanding the Judicial branch's power.
- 1809
  - The first British monarch to mark a jubilee in a significant way was King George III. The Golden Jubilee of George III on 25 October 1809 marked the forty-ninth anniversary of his accession and his entrance into the 50th year of his reign.

=== World leaders ===
- List of state leaders in the 18th century (1701–1800)
- List of state leaders in the 19th century (1801–1850)

=== Colonies ===
- North America/Latin America
  - Canada - a colony of Great Britain under the control of Secretary of State for War and the Colonies
  - Russian America - Alaska down through parts of California were claimed by Russia during this time, commercialized through the establishment of the Russian-American Company
  - New Spain - Present day Mexico, Central America, and the western United States were under the control of Spain during this decade.
- South America
  - Largely under colonial rule by Spain and Portugal. Spain was losing its grip due to problems at home, setting the stage for Spanish American wars of independence in the following decade.
- Africa
  - The Ottoman Empire loosely controlled the Maghreb (a.k.a. the Barbary Coast)

== Science and technology ==
=== Electricity ===
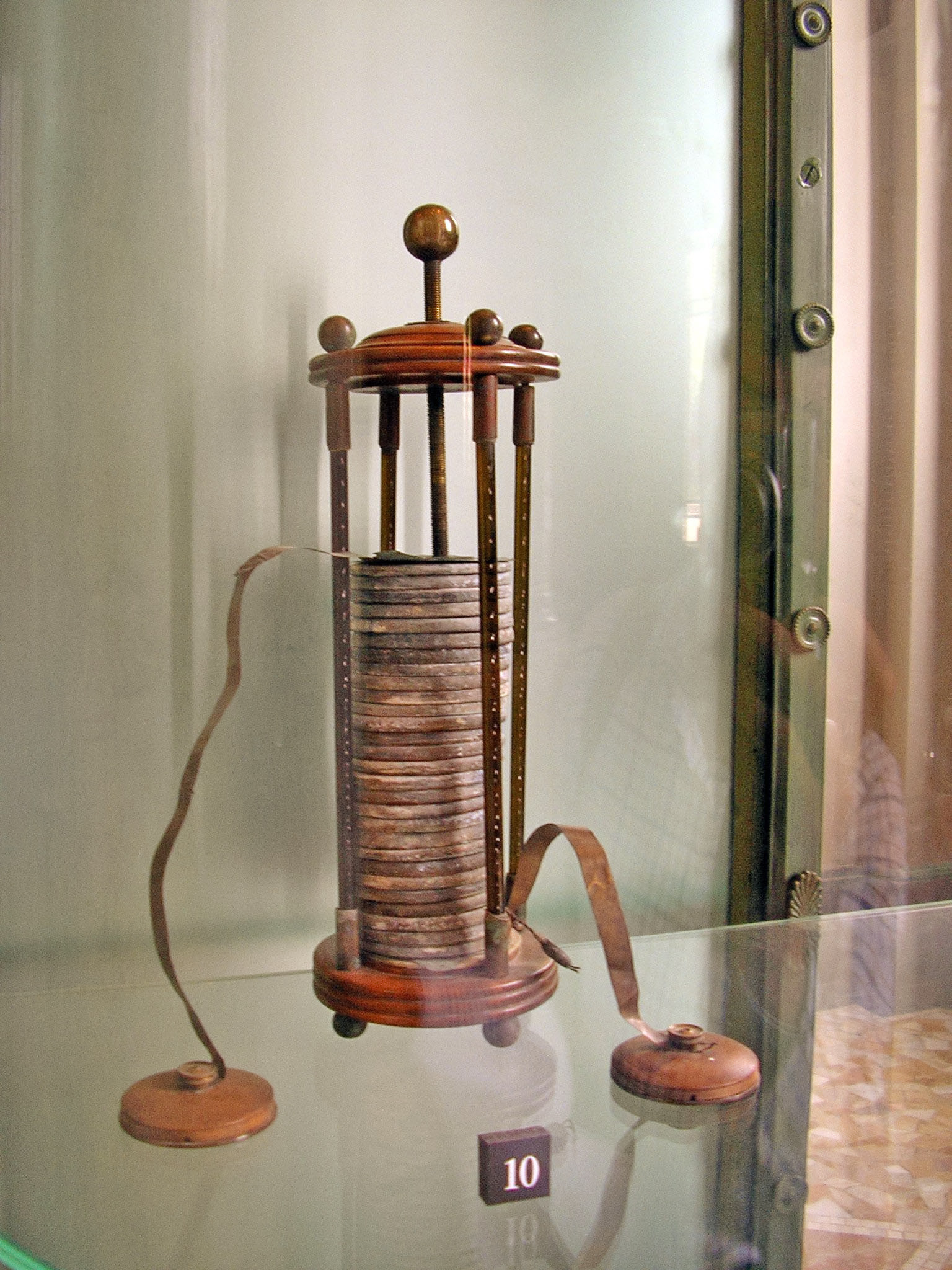
A voltaic pile on display in the Tempio Voltiano.

This decade contained some of the earliest experiments in electrochemistry. In 1800 Alessandro Volta constructed a voltaic pile, the first device to produce a large electric current, later known as the electric battery. Napoleon, informed of his works, summoned him in 1801 for a command performance of his experiments. He received many medals and decorations, including the Légion d'honneur.

Also in 1800, William Nicholson and Johann Wilhelm Ritter succeeded in decomposing water into hydrogen and oxygen by electrolysis. Soon thereafter Ritter discovered the process of electroplating. He also observed that the amount of metal deposited and the amount of oxygen produced during an electrolytic process depended on the distance between the electrodes. By 1801 Ritter observed thermoelectric currents and anticipated the discovery of thermoelectricity by Thomas Johann Seebeck.

In 1806, Humphry Davy decomposed potash and soda, employing a voltaic pile of approximately 250 cells, showing that these substances were respectively the oxides of potassium and sodium, which metals previously had been unknown. Employing a battery of 2,000 elements of a voltaic pile and charcoal enclosed in a vacuum, Davy gave the first public demonstration of the electric arc lamp in 1809.

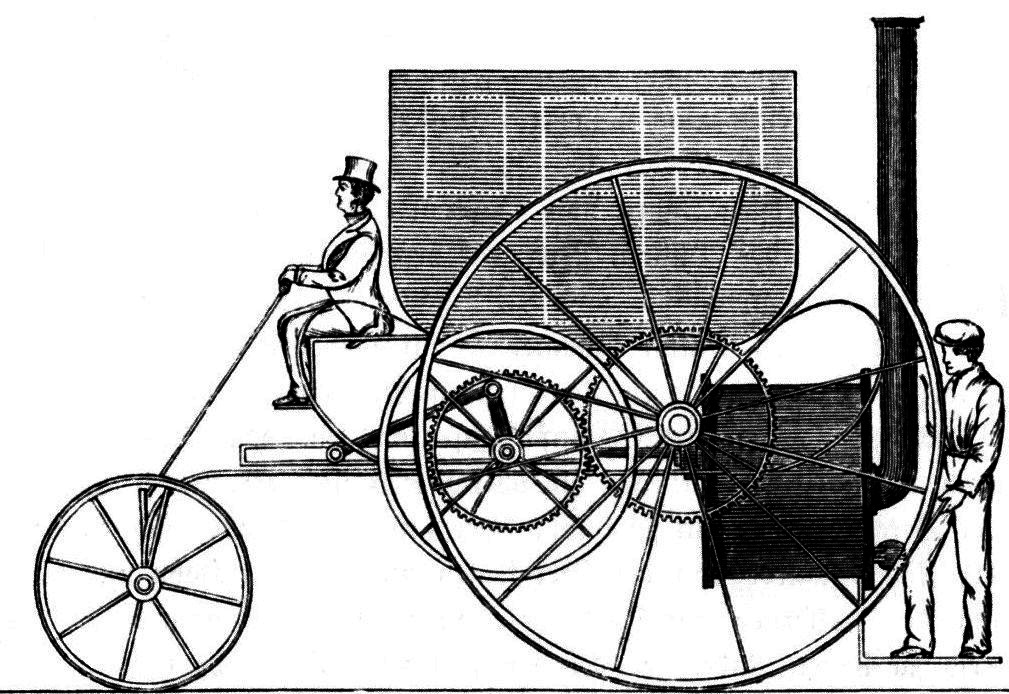
The London Steam Carriage

Steam transportation started to become viable during this decade. In 1802, William Symington's Charlotte Dundas, generally considered to be the world's first practical steamboat, made her first voyage. Later, in 1807, Robert Fulton's North River Steamboat, the world's first commercially successful steamboat, made her maiden voyage.

In 1801, Richard Trevithick ran a full-sized steam 'road locomotive' on the road in Camborne, England, followed by his 10-seater London Steam Carriage in 1803. In 1804, Trevithick built a prototype steam-powered railway locomotive.

The first railway began operating during this time. The Surrey Iron Railway in Great Britain was established by the British Parliament in 1801, and began operation on 26 July 1803. The railway relied on horse-drawn haulage rather than powered locomotives.

In 1807, Isaac de Rivas made a hydrogen gas-powered vehicle, the first vehicle powered by an internal combustion engine. James Watt creates first steam engine based on Newcomen's design.

=== Astronomy ===
- The first known asteroids are discovered in this decade:
  - Ceres (1 January 1801). Ceres is reclassified as a dwarf planet in 2006.
  - Pallas (28 March 1802)
  - Juno (1 September 1804)
  - Vesta (29 March 1807)

=== Other advances ===
- The Jacquard loom is invented in 1801.
- Ultraviolet radiation is discovered by Johann Wilhelm Ritter in 1801.
- Flag semaphore is gradually adopted by various navies of the world.
- Morphine is isolated from opium for the first time in 1804.
- Nicolas Appert develops a method to preserve food by means of canning in 1809.
- John Dalton publishes his atomic theory 1803.
- The Lewis and Clark Expedition reaches the Pacific coast in 1805, producing the first detailed maps of the Pacific Northwest and Upper Missouri River and charting more than 300+ new species of plant and wildlife along the way.

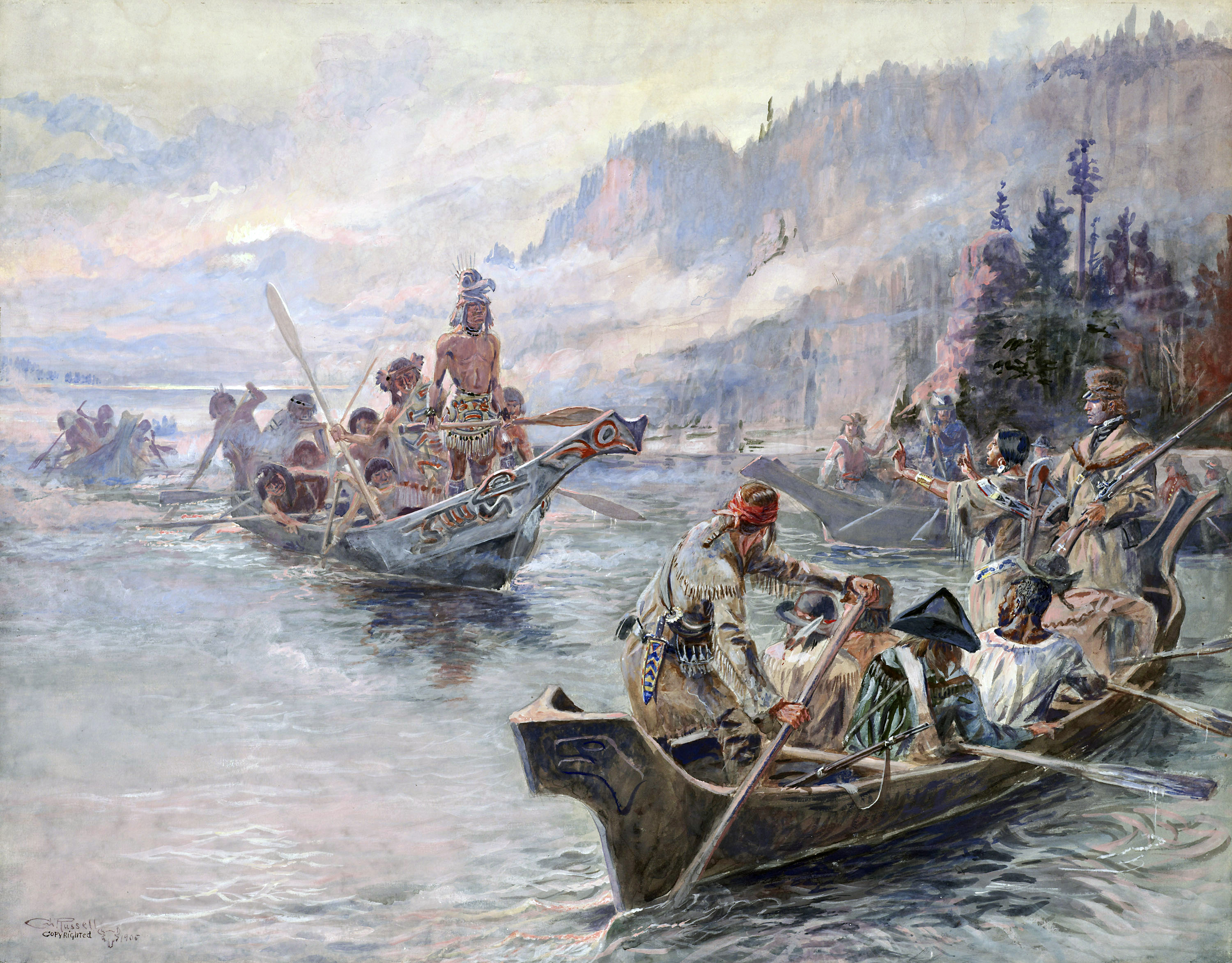
Lewis and Clark on the Lower Columbia (1905 watercolor)

== Culture ==
- The end of the Enlightenment following the beginning of the Romantic era in the next decade.

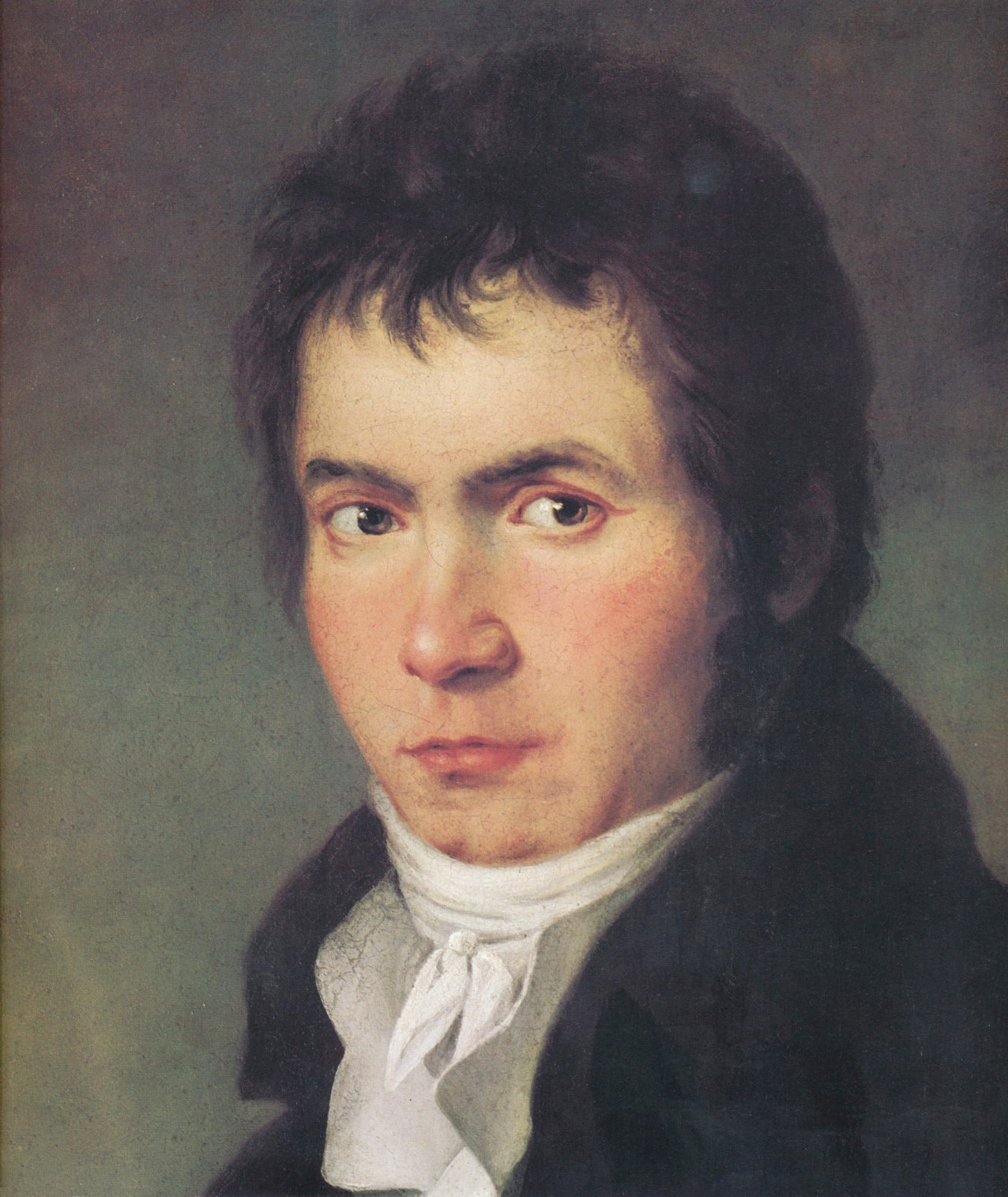
Ludwig van Beethoven in 1804

=== Music ===
- Ludwig van Beethoven's Symphony No. 1 premiers in Vienna in 1800.
- Bach's Sonatas and partitas for solo violin are published by Bote and Bock in 1802.
- Symphony No. 3 'Eroica' by Ludwig van Beethoven is completed in 1804.
- Fidelio by Ludwig van Beethoven is completed in 1805.
- Fourth Piano Concerto and Violin Concerto by Ludwig van Beethoven are completed in 1806.
- La Vestale by Gaspare Spontini is completed in 1807.
- Beethoven completes both his 5th Symphony and 6th Symphony "Pastoral" in 1808.

=== Fashion ===
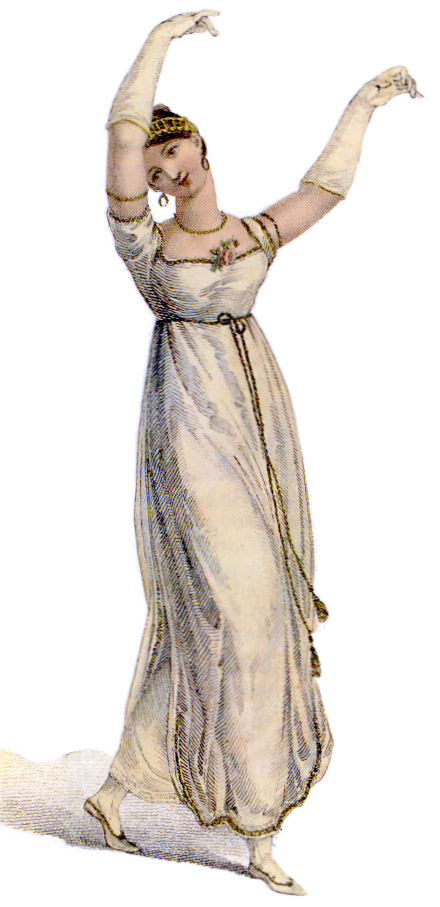
High-waisted dancing dress from 1809

Fashion in this period in European and European-influenced countries saw the final triumph of undress or informal styles over the brocades, lace, periwig, and powder of the earlier eighteenth century.

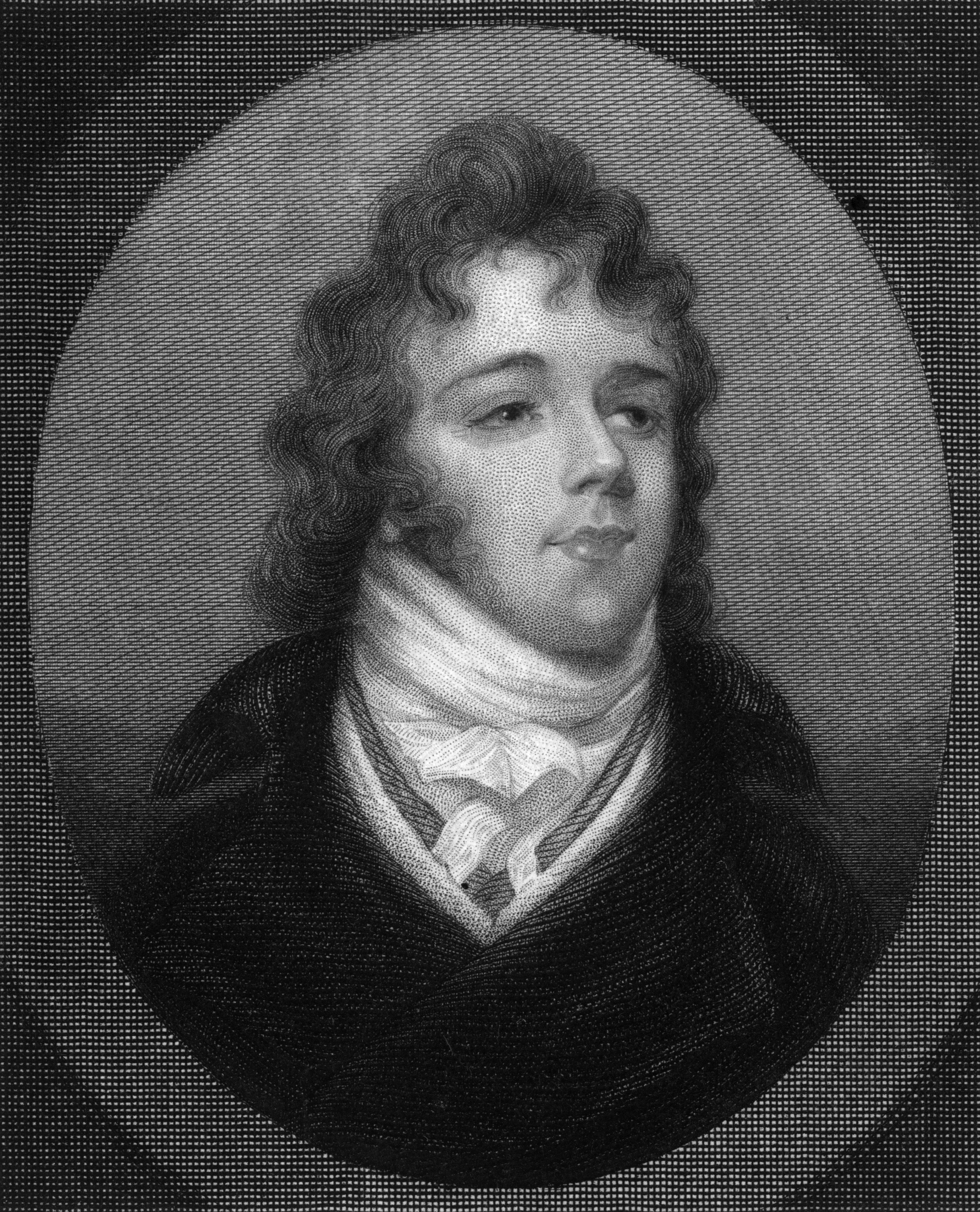
Beau Brummell

Fashionable women's clothing styles were based on the Empire silhouette — dresses were closely fitted to the torso just under the bust, falling loosely below. Inspired by neoclassical tastes, the short-waisted gowns sported soft, flowing skirts and were often made of white, almost transparent muslin, which was easily washed and draped loosely like the garments on Greek and Roman statues. No respectable woman would leave the house without a hat or bonnet. The antique head-dress, or Queen Mary coif, Chinese hat, Oriental inspired turban, and Highland helmet were popular. As for bonnets, their crowns and brims were adorned with increasingly elaborate ornamentations, such as feathers and ribbons. In fact, ladies of the day embellished their hats frequently, replacing old decorations with new trims or feathers.

1800–1809 was the height of dandyism in men's fashion in Europe, following the example of Beau Brummell. Older men, military officers, and those in conservative professions such as lawyers and physicians retained their wigs and powder into this period, but younger men of fashion wore their hair in short curls, often with long sideburns. This period saw the final abandonment of lace, embroidery, and other embellishment from serious men's clothing outside of formalized court dress. Instead, cut and tailoring became much more important as an indicator of quality.

== Wikisource reference work ==
- Adams, Henry (1889–1890). History of the United States During the Administrations of Thomas Jefferson . New York: Charles Scribner's Sons – via Wikisource. History that in part contains six chapters of narration remarking upon significant individuals of that era with added wikilinks linking back to their Wikipedia articles

== Births ==
1800

=== January–June ===
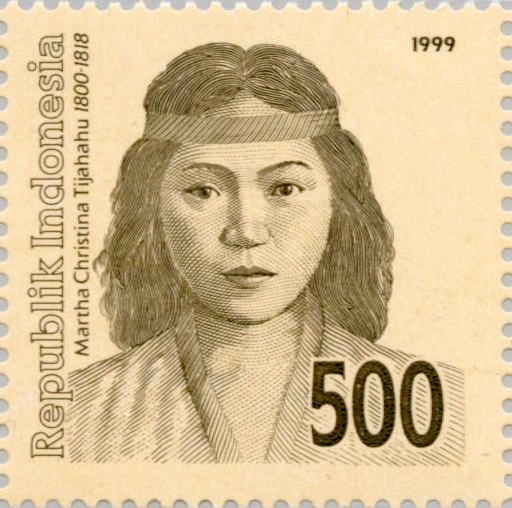
Martha Christina Tiahahu

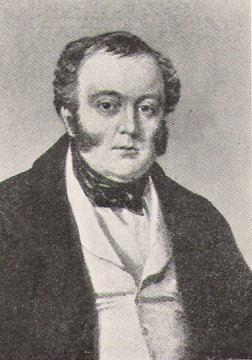
George Hudson

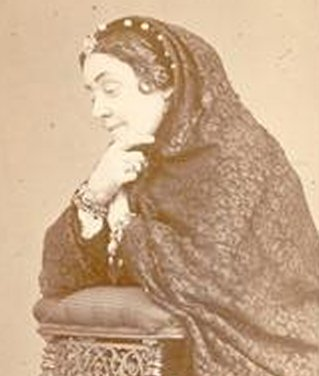
Anna Maria Hall

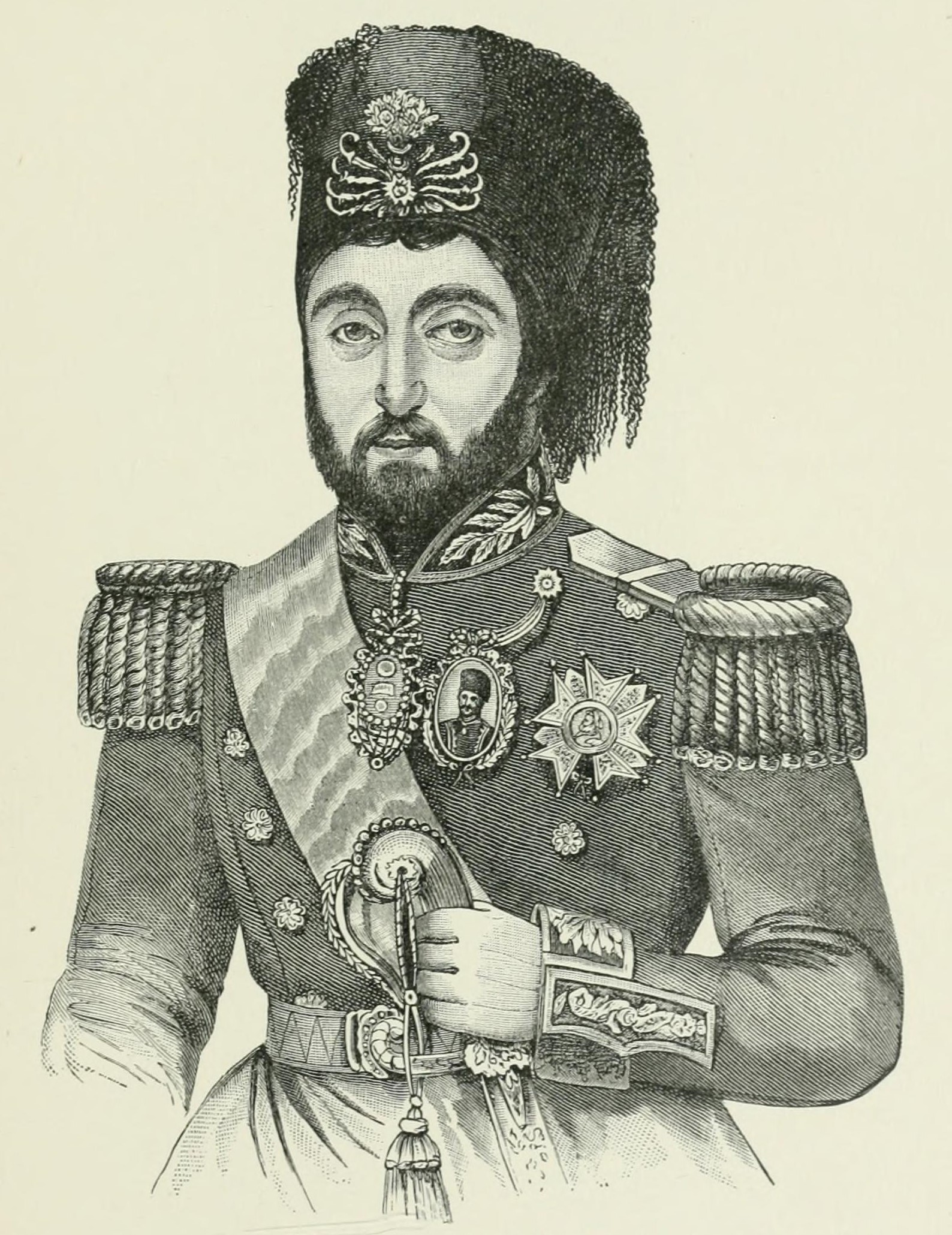
Mustafa Reşid Pasha

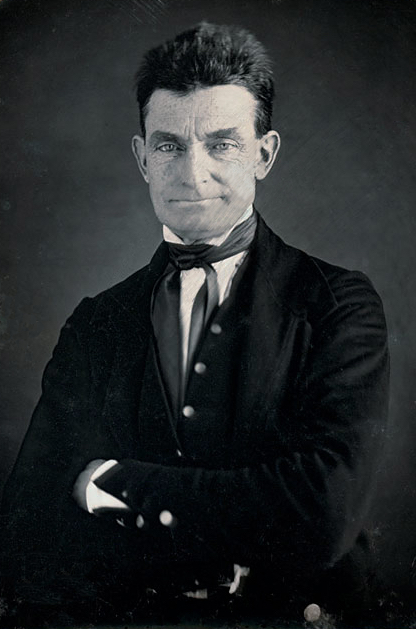
John Brown

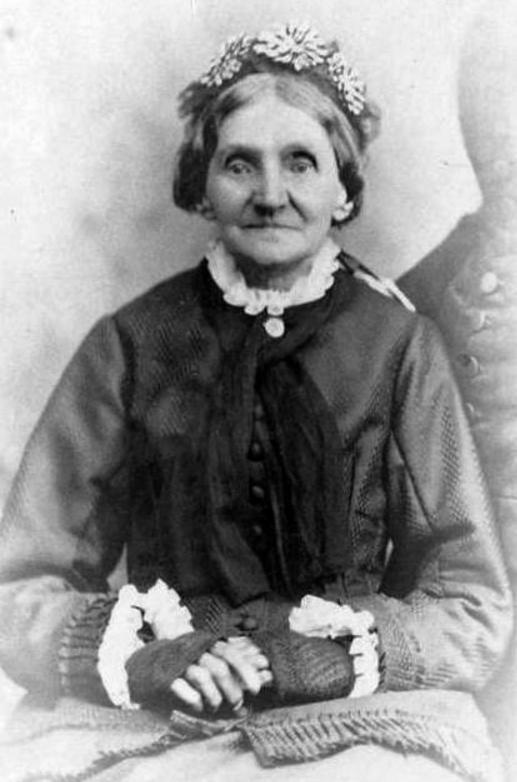
Elizabeth Ann Whitney

- January 1 – Francis Egerton, 1st Earl of Ellesmere, English landowner (d. 1857)
- January 4 – Martha Christina Tiahahu, Moluccan freedom fighter, national heroine of Indonesia (d. 1818)
- January 6 – Anna Maria Hall, Irish writer (d. 1881)
- January 7 – Millard Fillmore, 13th President of the United States (d. 1874)
- January 11 – Ányos Jedlik, Hungarian physicist, inventor of the dynamo (d. 1895)
- January 12 – George Villiers, 4th Earl of Clarendon, English diplomat, statesman (d. 1870)
- January 14 – Ludwig von Köchel, Austrian musicologist (d. 1877)
- January 17 – Caleb Cushing, American statesman, diplomat (d. 1879)
- January 24 – Edwin Chadwick, English social reformer (d. 1890)
- Johann Gerhard Oncken, German Baptist preacher (d. 1884)
- Elizabeth Ann Whitney, American Mormon leader (d. 1882)
- January 27 – Evelyn Denison, 1st Viscount Ossington, English statesman (d. 1875)
- February 1 – Brian Houghton Hodgson, English civil servant (d. 1894)
- February 6 – Achille Devéria, French painter, lithographer (d. 1857)
- February 9 – Hyrum Smith, American religious leader (d. 1844)
- Joseph von Führich, Austrian painter (d. 1876)
- March 2 – Yevgeny Baratynsky, Russian poet (d. 1844)
- March 3 – Heinrich Georg Bronn, German geologist, paleontologist (d. 1862)
- March 4 – William Price, Welsh physician, eccentric (d. 1893)
- March 10
  - Victor Aimé Huber, German social reformer (d. 1869)
  - George Hudson, English railway financier (d. 1871)
- March 13 – Mustafa Reşid Pasha, Turkish statesman, diplomat (d. 1858)
- March 16 – Emperor Ninkō of Japan (d. 1846)
- March 17 – Rudolf Ewald Stier, German Protestant churchman, mystic (d. 1862)
- March 20
  - Braulio Carrillo Colina, Costa Rican head of state, politician (d. 1845)
  - Gottfried Bernhardy, German philologist, literary historian (d. 1875)
- March 25 – Ernst Heinrich Karl von Dechen, German geologist, mineralogist (d. 1889)
- March 28 – Johann Georg Wagler, German herpetologist (d. 1832)
- April 2 – Andrzej Artur Zamoyski, Polish nobleman (d. 1874)
- April 4 – Tokugawa Nariaki, Japanese daimyō of Mito (d. 1860)
- April 10 – Henri-Gustave Delvigne, French soldier, weapon inventor (d. 1876)
- April 15 – James Clark Ross, British naval officer, explorer (d. 1862)
- April 16
  - Jakob Heine, German orthopaedist (d. 1879)
  - George Bingham, 3rd Earl of Lucan, British soldier (d. 1888)
- April 19 – Robert Goodenow, American politician and former member of the United States House of Representatives (d. 1874).
- May 1 – James Black, American bladesmith, creator of the original Bowie knife (d. 1870)
- May 4 – John McLeod Campbell, Scottish churchman (d. 1872)
- May 5 – Louis Christophe François Hachette, French publisher (d. 1864)
- May 6 – Roman Sanguszko, Polish noble (d. 1881)
- May 9 – John Brown, American abolitionist (d. 1859)
- May 23 – Rómulo Díaz de la Vega, 23rd President of Mexico (d. 1877)
- May 30 – Karl Wilhelm Feuerbach, German geometer (d. 1834)
- June 1 – Charles Fremantle, British Royal Navy officer (d. 1869)
- June 2 – Nicholas P. Trist, secretary to President Andrew Jackson of the U.S. (d. 1874)
- June 3 – Gustaw Potworowski, Polish activist (d. 1860)
- June 12 – Samuel Wright Mardis, American politician (d. 1836)
- June 17 – William Parsons, 3rd Earl of Rosse, Irish astronomer (d. 1867)
- June 23 – Karol Marcinkowski, Polish physician, social activist (d. 1846)
- June 29 – William Boxall, 2nd director of the National Gallery in London (d. 1879)
- June 30 – Richard Bethell, 1st Baron Westbury, Lord Chancellor of Great Britain (d. 1873)

=== July–December ===
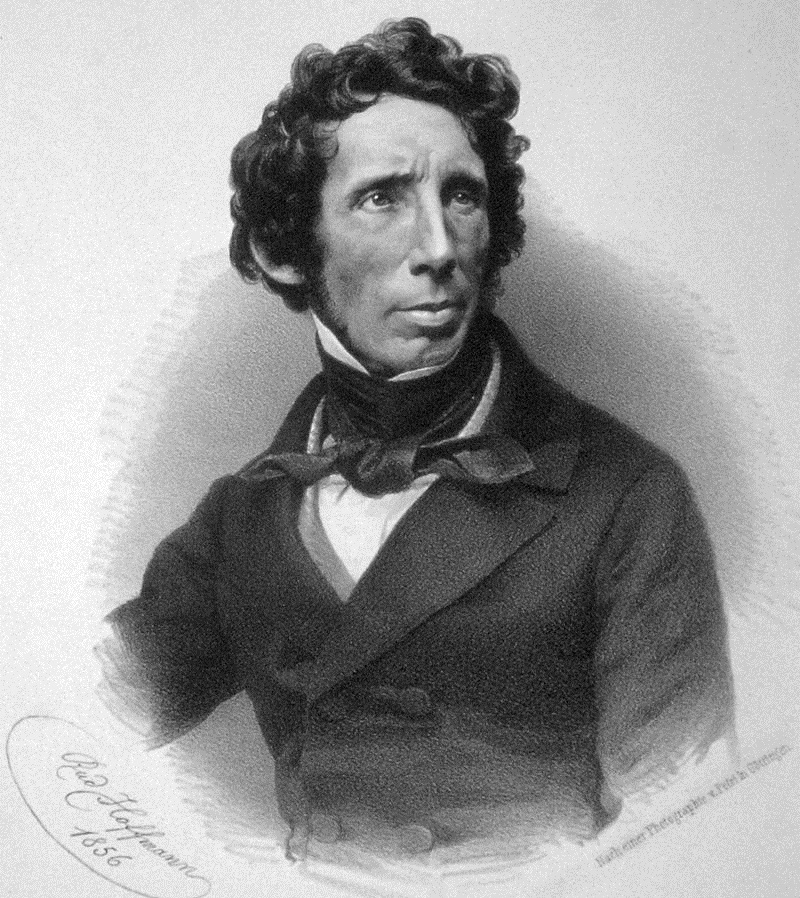
Friedrich Wöhler

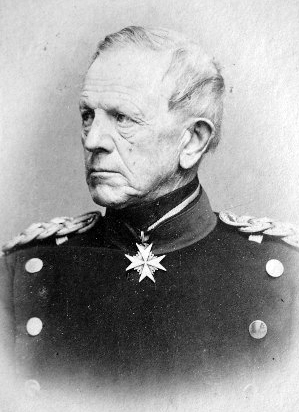
Helmuth von Moltke the Elder

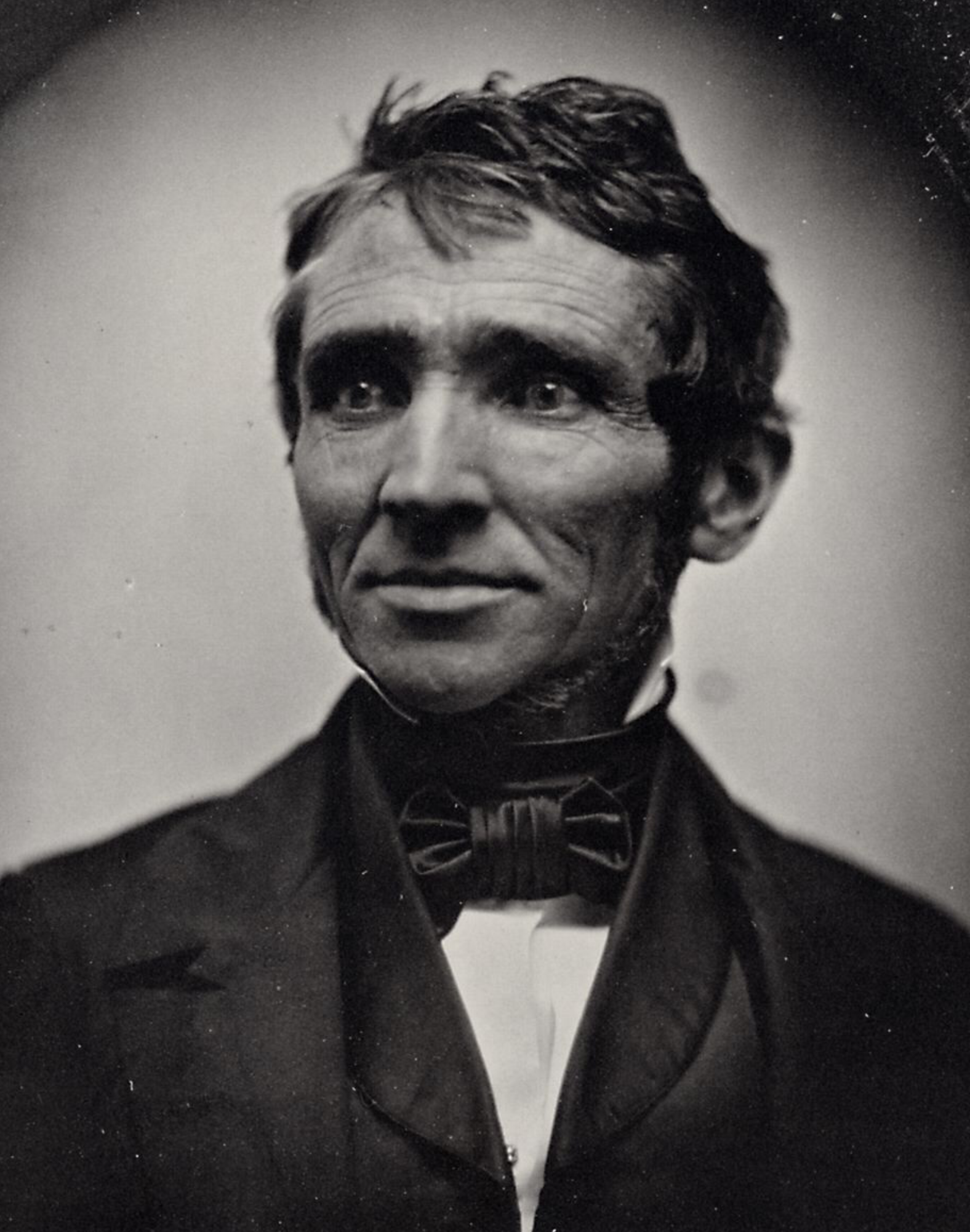
Charles Goodyear

- July 15 – Sidney Breese, American senator from Illinois, father of the Illinois Central Railroad (d. 1878)
- July 19 – Juan José Flores, 2-time President of Ecuador (d. 1864)
- July 21 – Constance Trotti, Belgian salonniére, culture patron (d. 1871)
- July 24 – Henry Shaw, American botanist (d. 1889)
- July 29 – George Bradshaw, English timetable publisher (d. 1853)
- July 31 – Friedrich Wöhler, German chemist (d. 1882)
- August 12 – Jean-Jacques Ampère, French philologist, writer and historian (d. 1864)
- August 17 – Charles Rogier, twice Prime Minister of Belgium (d. 1885)
- August 20 – Bernhard Heine, German physician, bone specialist and inventor (d. 1846)
- August 22
  - Edward Bouverie Pusey, English churchman (d. 1882)
  - Frank Stone, English painter (d. 1859)
- September 1 – Giuseppe Gabriel Balsamo-Crivelli, Italian naturalist (d. 1874)
- September 22 – George Bentham, English botanist (d. 1884)
- October 14 – John Hogan, Irish sculptor (d. 1858)
- October 19 – Salome Sellers, American centenarian, last surviving person from the 18th century (d. 1909)
- October 23 – Henri Milne-Edwards, French zoologist (d. 1885)
- October 26 – Helmuth von Moltke the Elder, German field marshal (d. 1891)
- November 21 – Barney Aaron, English bare-knuckle boxer (d. 1850)
- November 22 – Linn Boyd, 20th Speaker of the U.S. House of Representatives (d. 1859)
- December 3 – France Prešeren, Slovenian romantic poet (d. 1849)
- December 25 – John Phillips, English geologist (d. 1874)
- December 29 – Charles Goodyear, American inventor of the vulcanization process (d. 1860)

1801

=== January–June ===
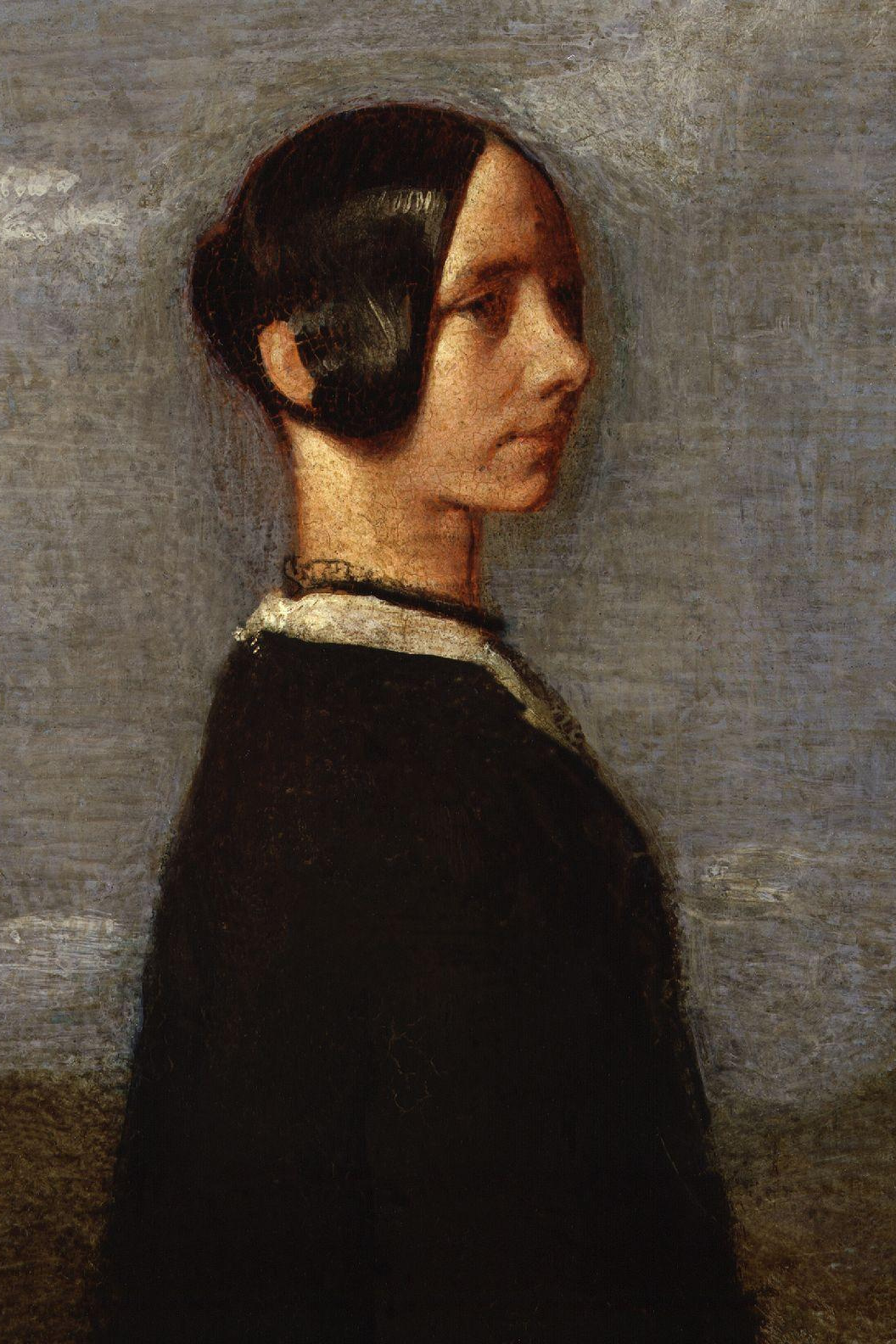
Jane Welsh Carlyle

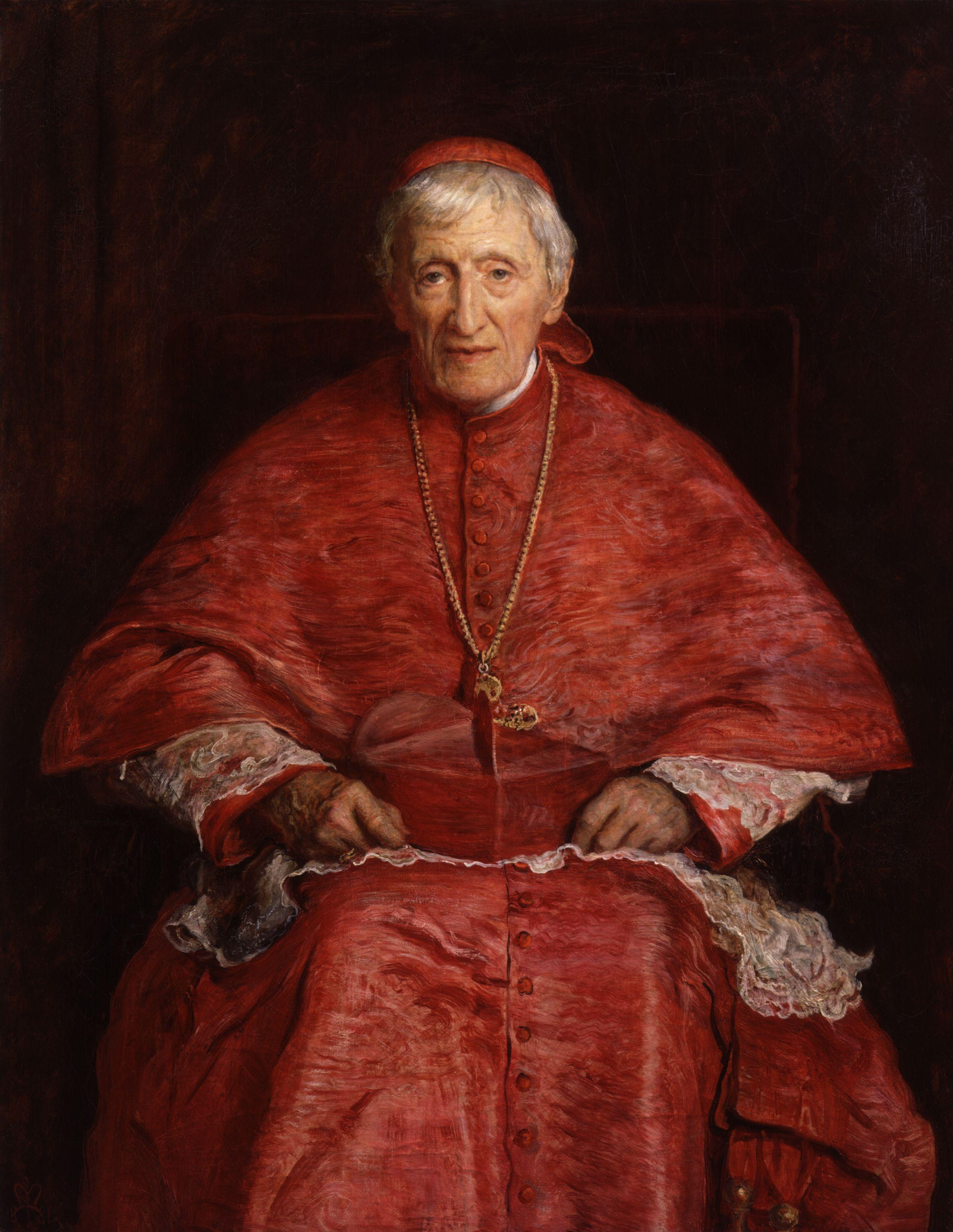
John Henry Newman

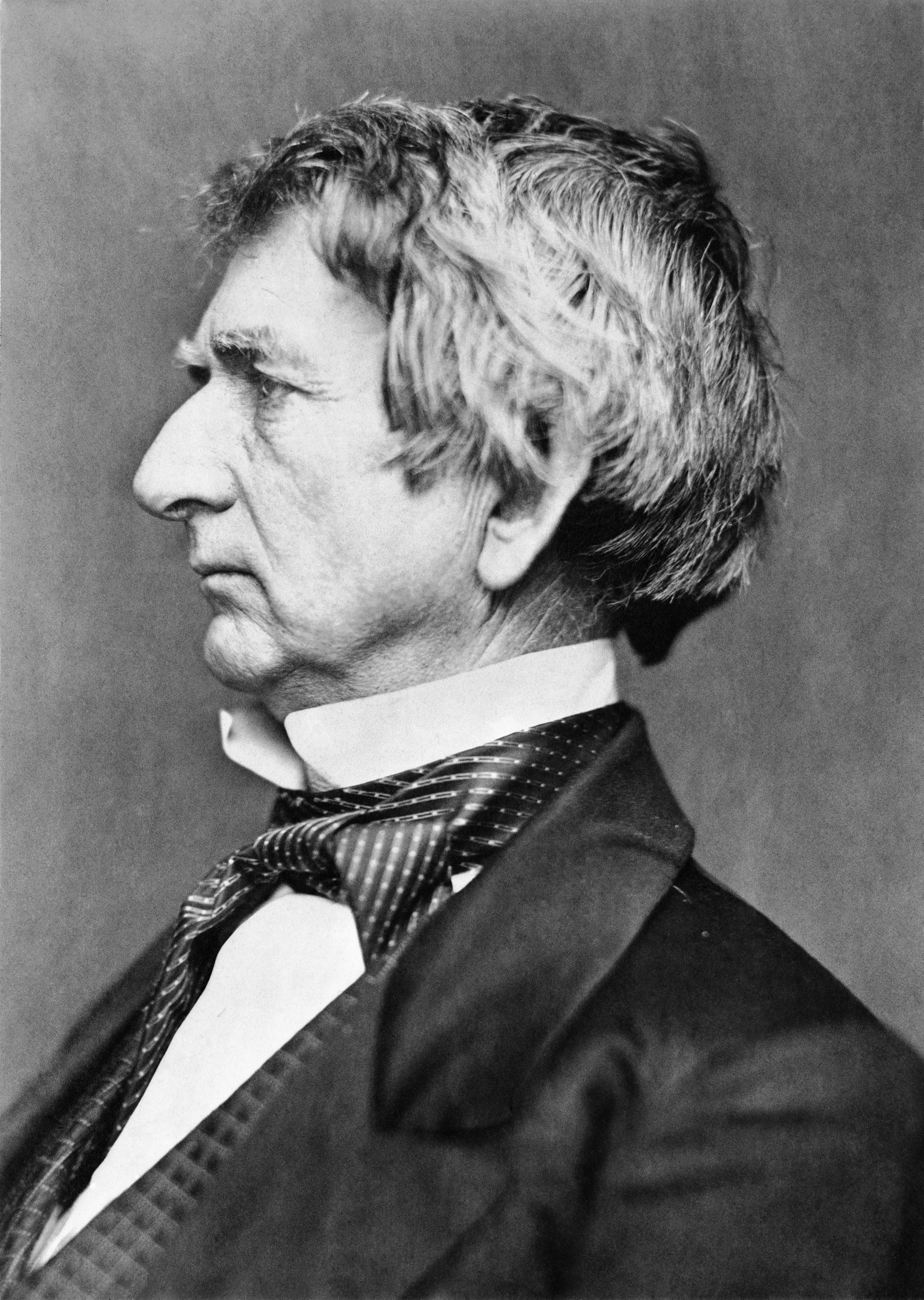
William H. Seward

- January 3 – Gijsbert Haan, Dutch-American religious leader (d. 1874)
- January 10 – Thierry Hermès, German-born French businessman, founder of Hermès (d. 1878)
- January 11 – Honório Hermeto Carneiro Leão, Marquis of Paraná, Brazilian politician (d. 1856)
- January 14 – Jane Welsh Carlyle, Scottish writer, wife of Thomas Carlyle (d. 1866)
- February 1
  - Jean-Baptiste Boussingault, French chemist (d. 1887)
  - Thomas Cole, American artist (d. 1848)
- February 21 – John Henry Newman, English cardinal (d. 1890)
- March 15 – George Perkins Marsh, American diplomat, philologist and pioneer environmentalist (d. 1882)
- May 5 – Pío Pico, last Governor of Alta California (d. 1894)
- May 11 – Henri Labrouste, French architect (d. 1875)
- May 16 – William H. Seward, 24th United States Secretary of State (d. 1872)
- May 17 – Lovisa Åhrberg, first woman doctor, surgeon in Sweden (d. 1881)
- June 1 – Brigham Young, American Mormon leader, colonizer (d. 1877)
- June 5 – William Scamp, English architect and engineer (d. 1872)
- June 4 – James Pennethorne, English architect (d. 1871)
- June 14 – Heber C. Kimball, American religious leader (d. 1868)
- June 16 – Julius Plücker, German mathematician, physicist (d. 1868)
- June 30 – Frédéric Bastiat, French philosopher (d. 1850)

=== July–December ===
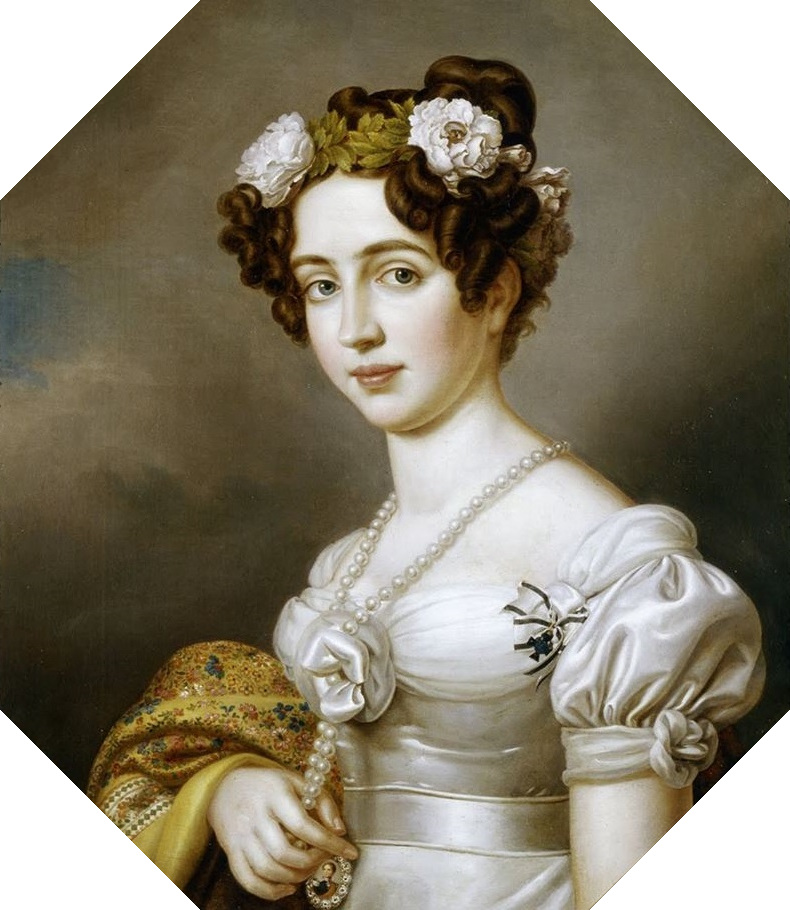
Elisabeth Ludovika of Bavaria

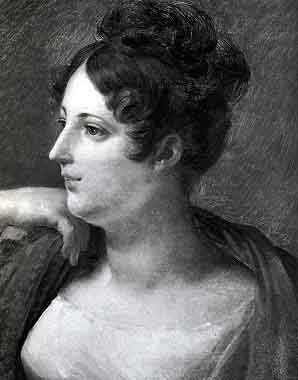
Hortense Allart

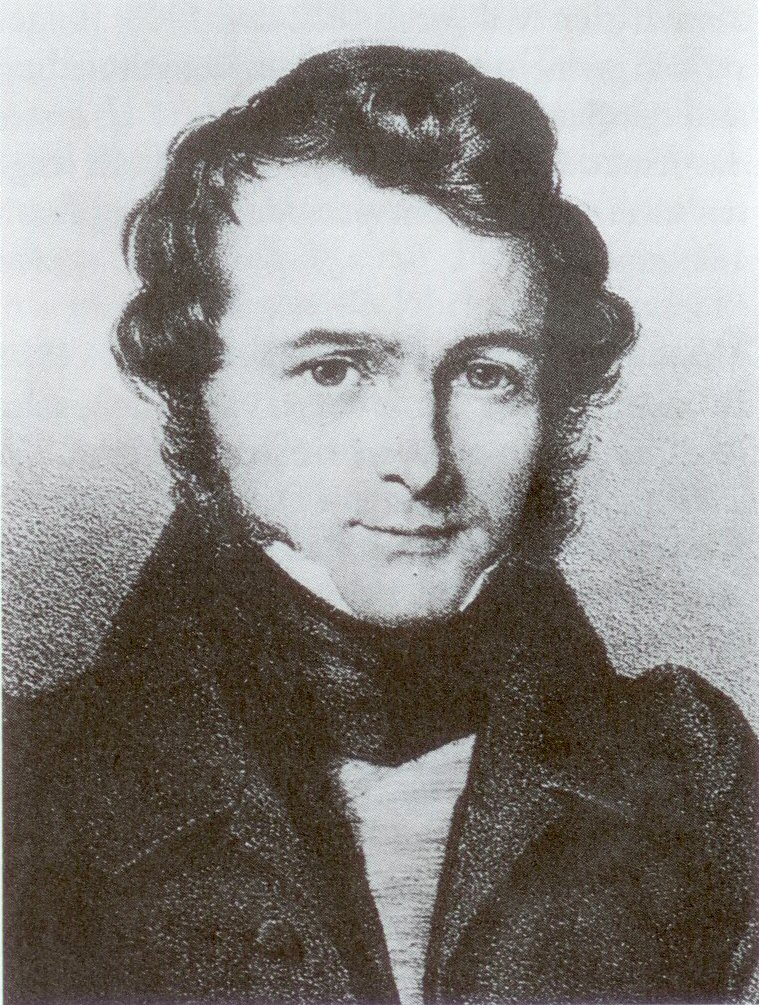
Christian Erich Hermann von Meyer

- July 5 – David Farragut, American admiral (d. 1870)
- July 14 – Johannes Peter Müller, German physiologist, comparative anatomist, ichthyologist, and herpetologist (d. 1858)
- July 27 – George Biddell Airy, English mathematician, astronomer (d. 1892)
- September 1 – Hortense Allart, French writer (d. 1879)
- September 3 – Christian Erich Hermann von Meyer, German palaeontologist (d. 1869)
- October 12
  - Friedrich Frey-Herosé, member of the Swiss Federal Council (d. 1873)
  - Carl August von Steinheil, German engineer, astronomer (d. 1870)
- October 23 – Albert Lortzing, German composer (d. 1851)
- November 3
  - Karl Baedeker, German author, publisher (d. 1859)
  - Vincenzo Bellini, Italian composer (d. 1835)
- November 10 – Vladimir Dal, Russian lexicographer (d. 1872)
- November 13 – Queen Elisabeth Ludovika of Bavaria, queen of Prussia (d. 1873)
- December 11 – Christian Dietrich Grabbe, German writer (d. 1836)
- December 14 – Joseph Lane, American politician and general, 1st Governor of Oregon (d. 1881)

=== Date unknown ===
- Dai Xi, Chinese painter (d. 1860)
- Brita Sofia Hesselius, Swedish photographer (d. 1866)

1802

=== January–June ===
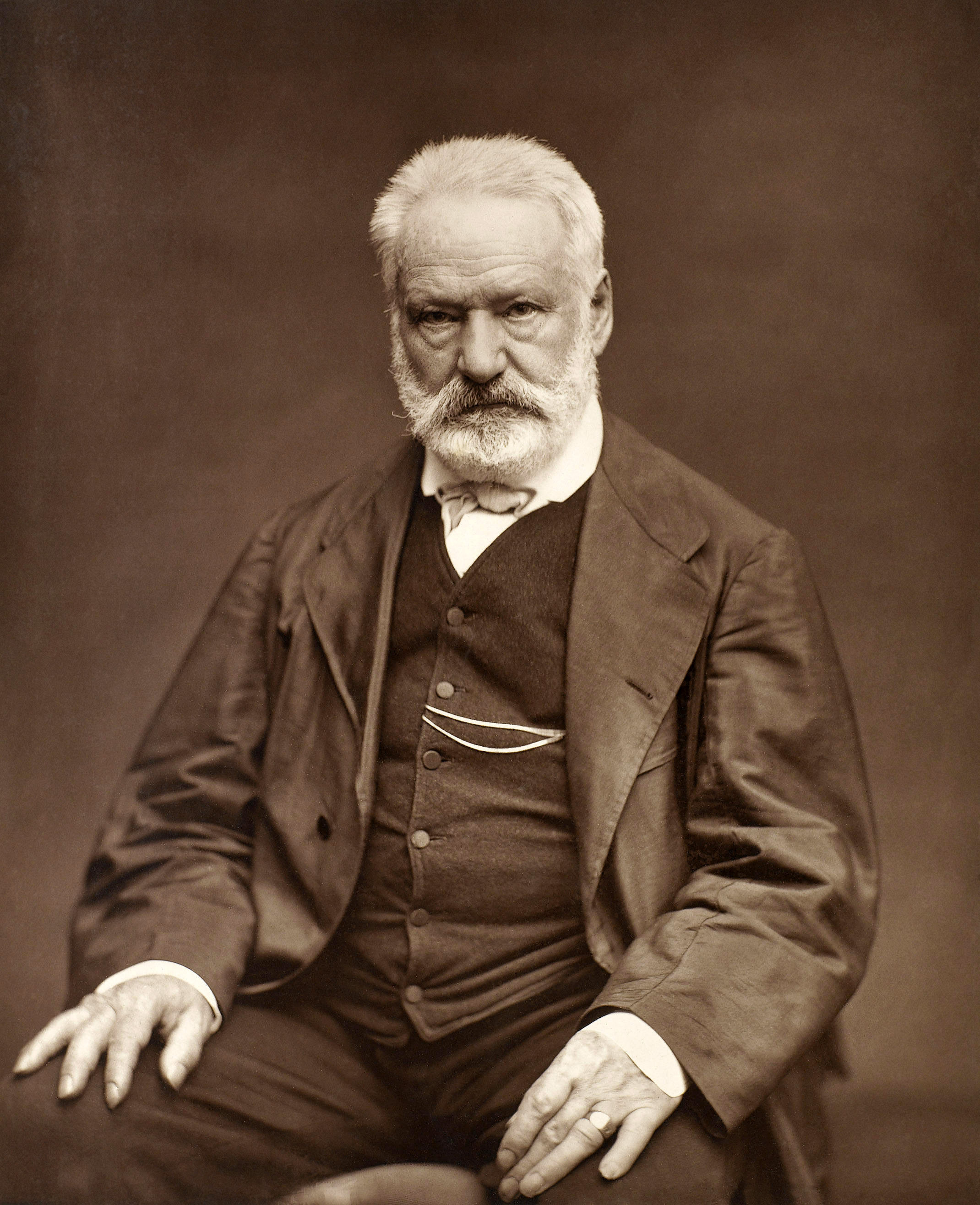
Victor Hugo

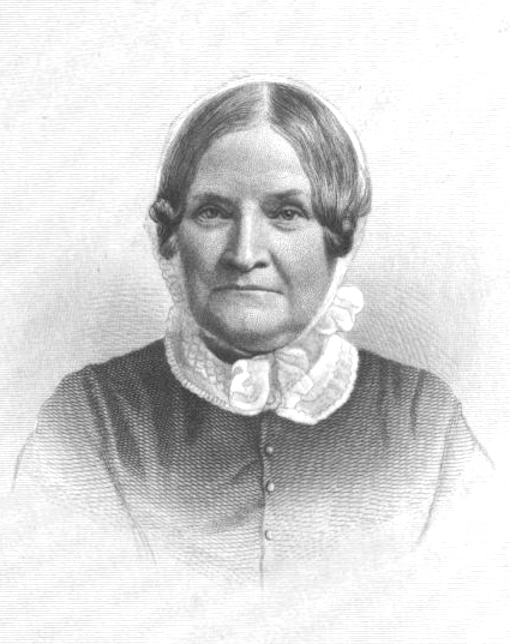
Lydia Maria Child

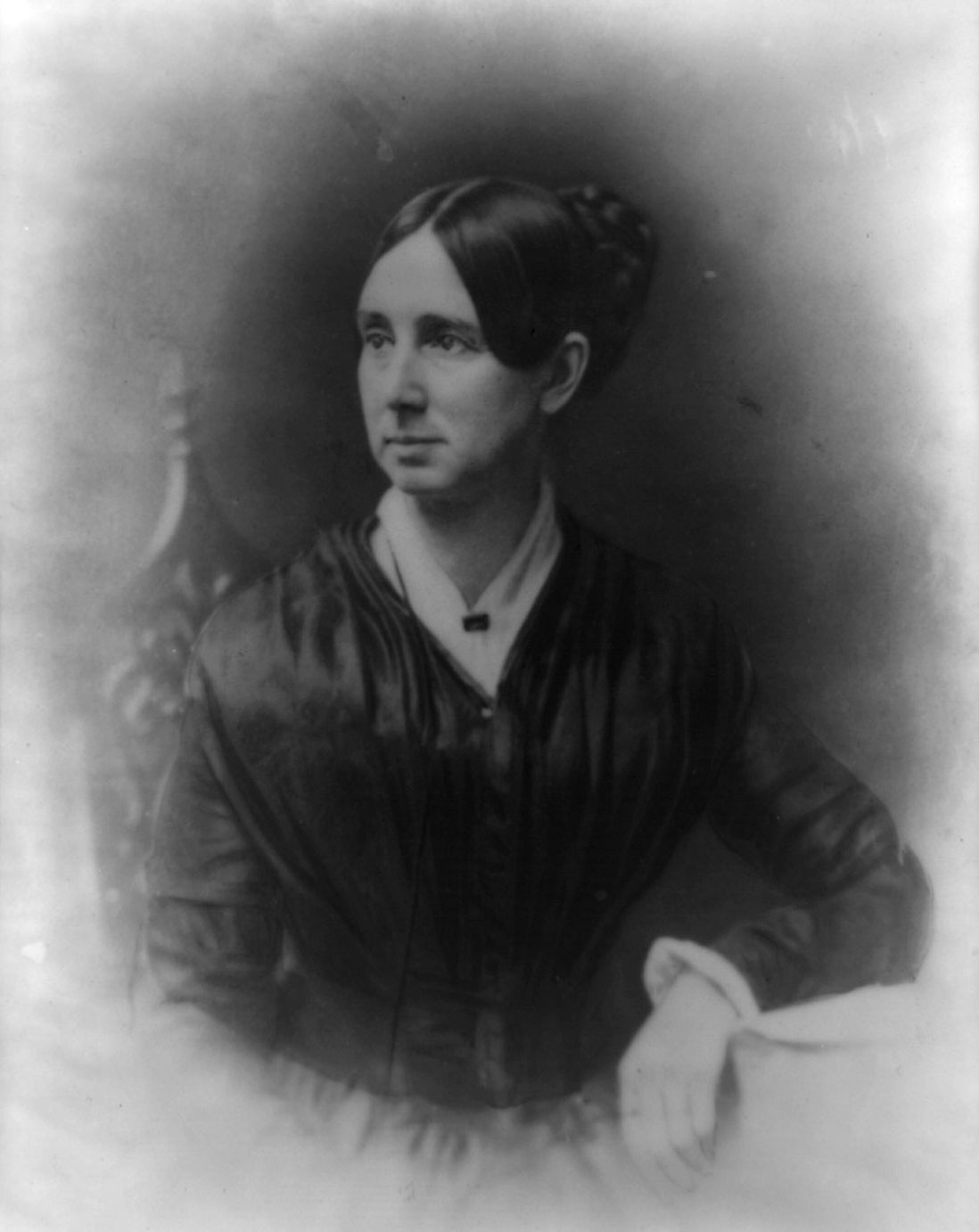
Dorothea Dix

- January 3 – Charles Pelham Villiers, British politician (d. 1898)
- January 10 – Carl Ritter von Ghega, Albanian-born Venetian road engineer (d. 1860)
- January 22 – Richard Upjohn, English-American architect (d. 1878)
- February 6 – Charles Wheatstone, English physicist, inventor (d. 1875)
- February 11 – Lydia Maria Child, American abolitionist author (d. 1880)
- February 15 – Jean-Jacques Uhrich, French general (d. 1886)
- February 16 – Phineas Quimby, American physician (d. 1866)
- February 19 – Wilhelm Matthias Naeff, Swiss Federal Councillor (d. 1881)
- February 26 – Victor Hugo, French author (d. 1885)
- March 7 – Edwin Henry Landseer, British painter (d. 1873)
- March 8 – Zebulon Crocker, American congregationalist pastor (d. 1847)
- March 25 – Maria Silfvan, Finnish actor (d. 1865)
- March 27 – Charles-Mathias Simons, Prime Minister of Luxembourg (d. 1874)
- April 4 – Dorothea Dix, American activist (d. 1887)
- April 9 – Elias Lönnrot, Finnish folklorist, philologist who created the Finnish national epic, the Kalevala (d. 1884)
- May 2 – Heinrich Gustav Magnus, German chemist, physicist (d. 1870)
- May 26 – Karl Ferdinand Ranke, German educator (d. 1876)
- June 12 – Harriet Martineau, British social theorist, writer (d. 1876)

=== July–December ===
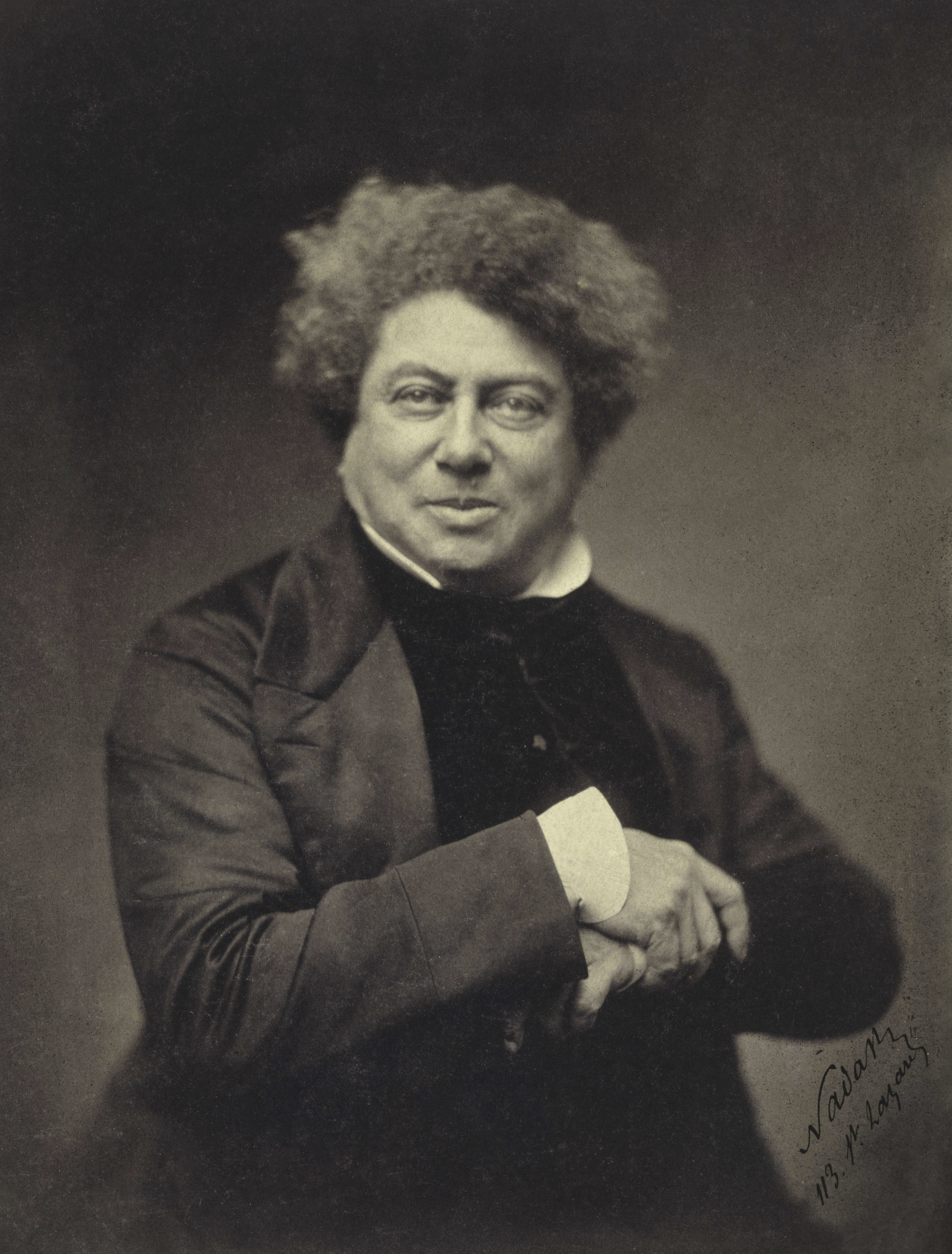
Alexandre Dumas

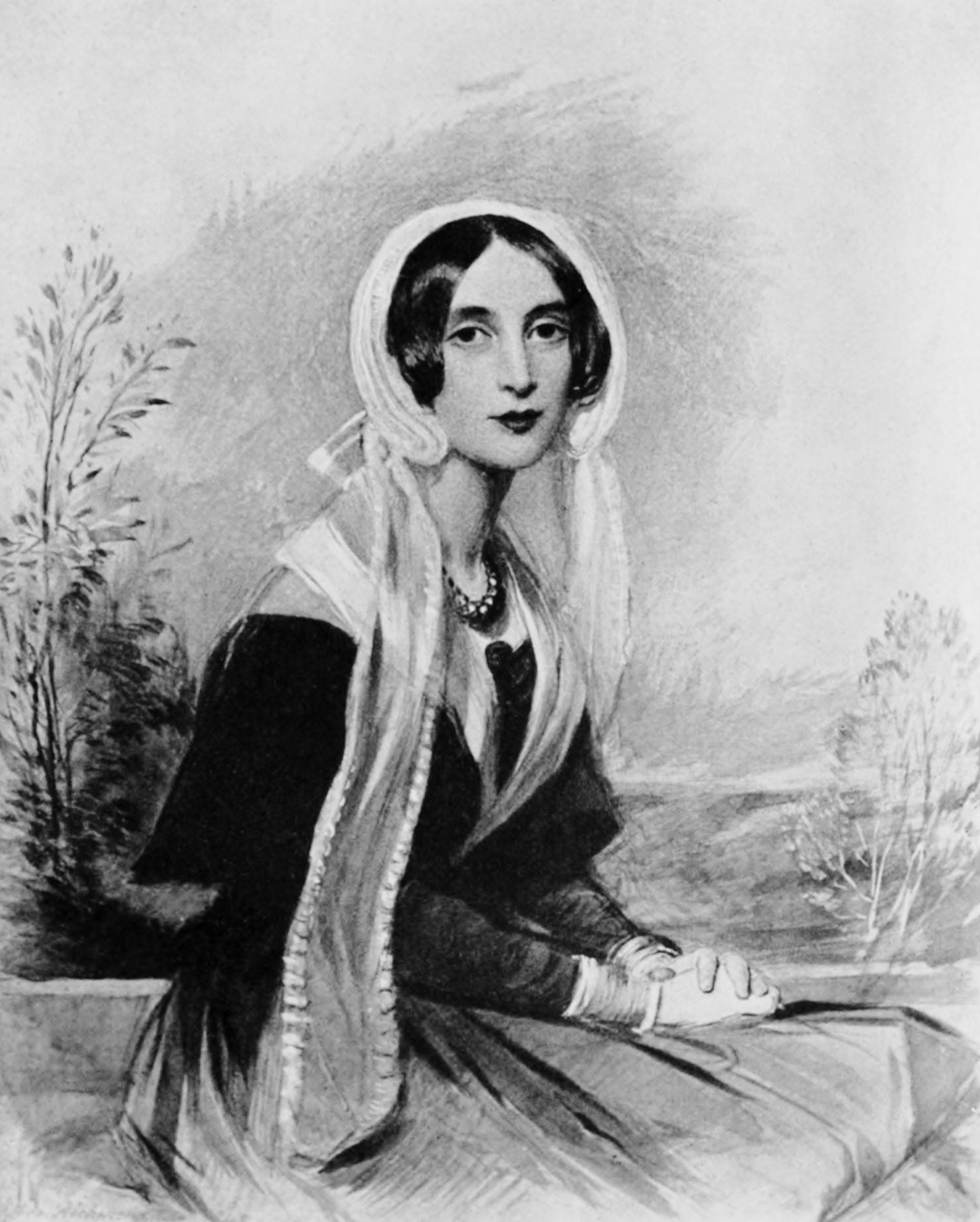
Sara Coleridge

- July 5 (June 23 O.S.) – Pavel Nakhimov, Russian admiral (d. 1855)
- July 24 – Alexandre Dumas, French author (d. 1870)
- July 26 – Mariano Arista, President of Mexico (d. 1855)
- August 4 – Joseph Bonnell, hero of the Texas Revolution (d. 1840)
- August 5 – Niels Henrik Abel, Norwegian mathematician (d. 1829)
- August 31 – Karl von Urban, Austrian field marshal (d. 1877)
- September 19 – Lajos Kossuth, Hungarian politician (d. 1894)
- September 30 – Antoine Jérôme Balard, French chemist (d. 1876)
- October 31 – Benoît Fourneyron, French engineer (d. 1867)
- November 9 – Elijah P. Lovejoy, American abolitionist (d. 1837)
- November 19 – Solomon Foot, American politician (d. 1866)
- December 12 – Jakob Joseph Matthys, Swiss Catholic priest (d. 1866)
- December 15 – János Bolyai, Hungarian mathematician (d. 1860)
- December 23 – Sara Coleridge, British scholar (d. 1852)

=== Date unknown ===
- Friedrich Hohe, German lithographer, painter (d. 1870)
- Emma Fürstenhoff, Swedish florist (d. 1871)
- Mary Short, queen consort of Awadh (d. 1849)

1803

=== January–June ===
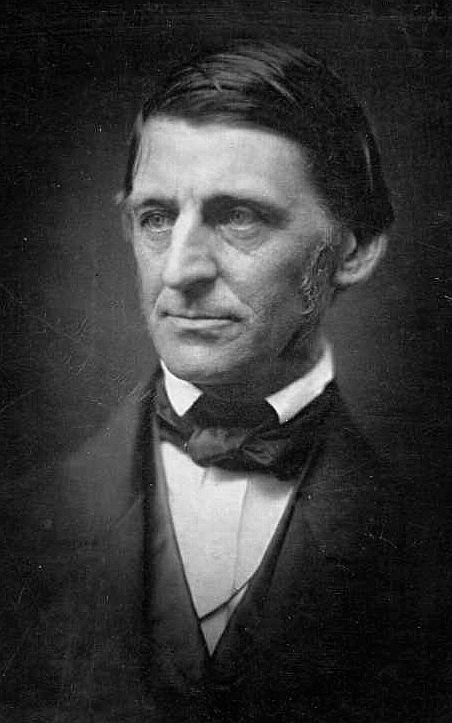
Ralph Waldo Emerson

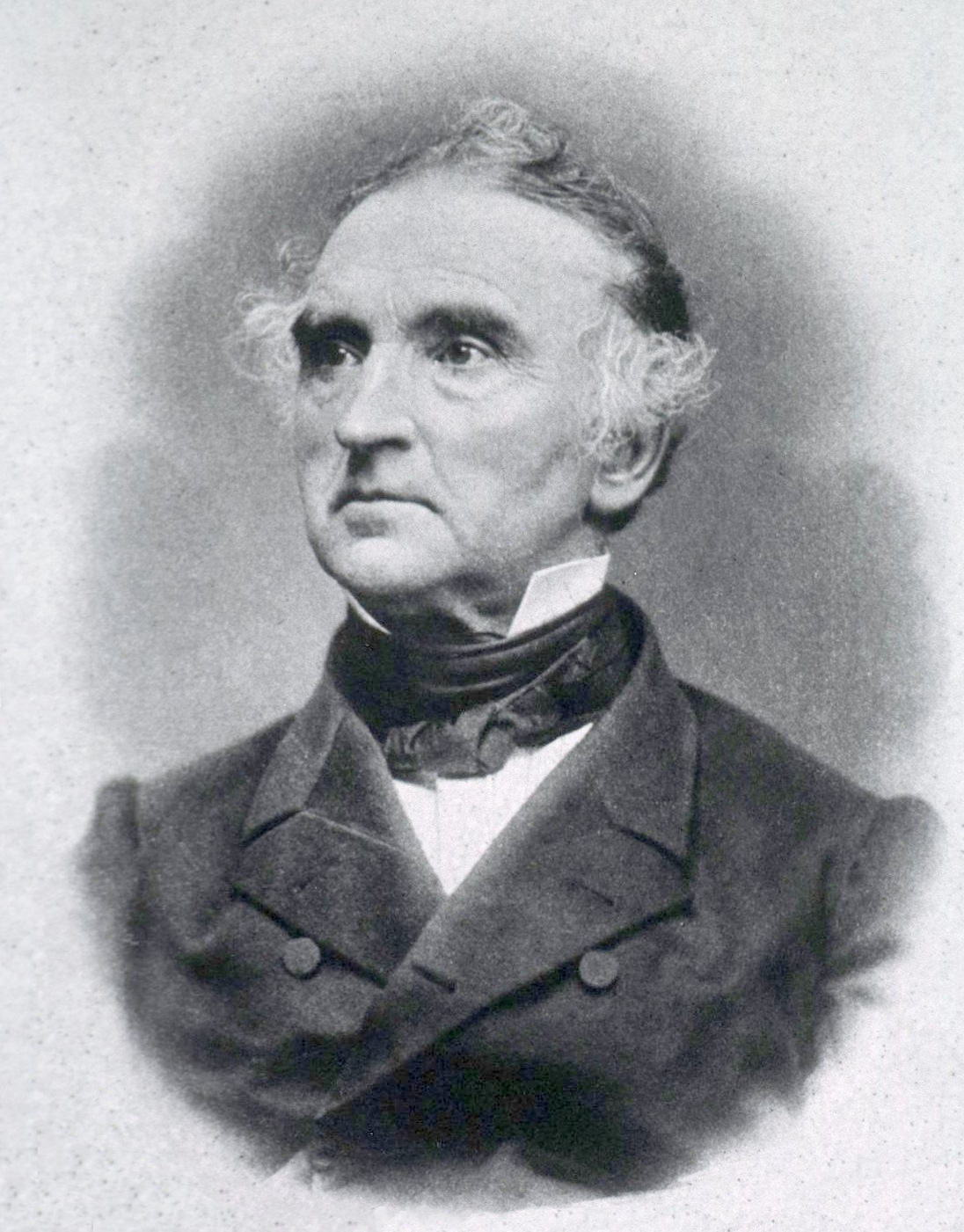
Justus von Liebig

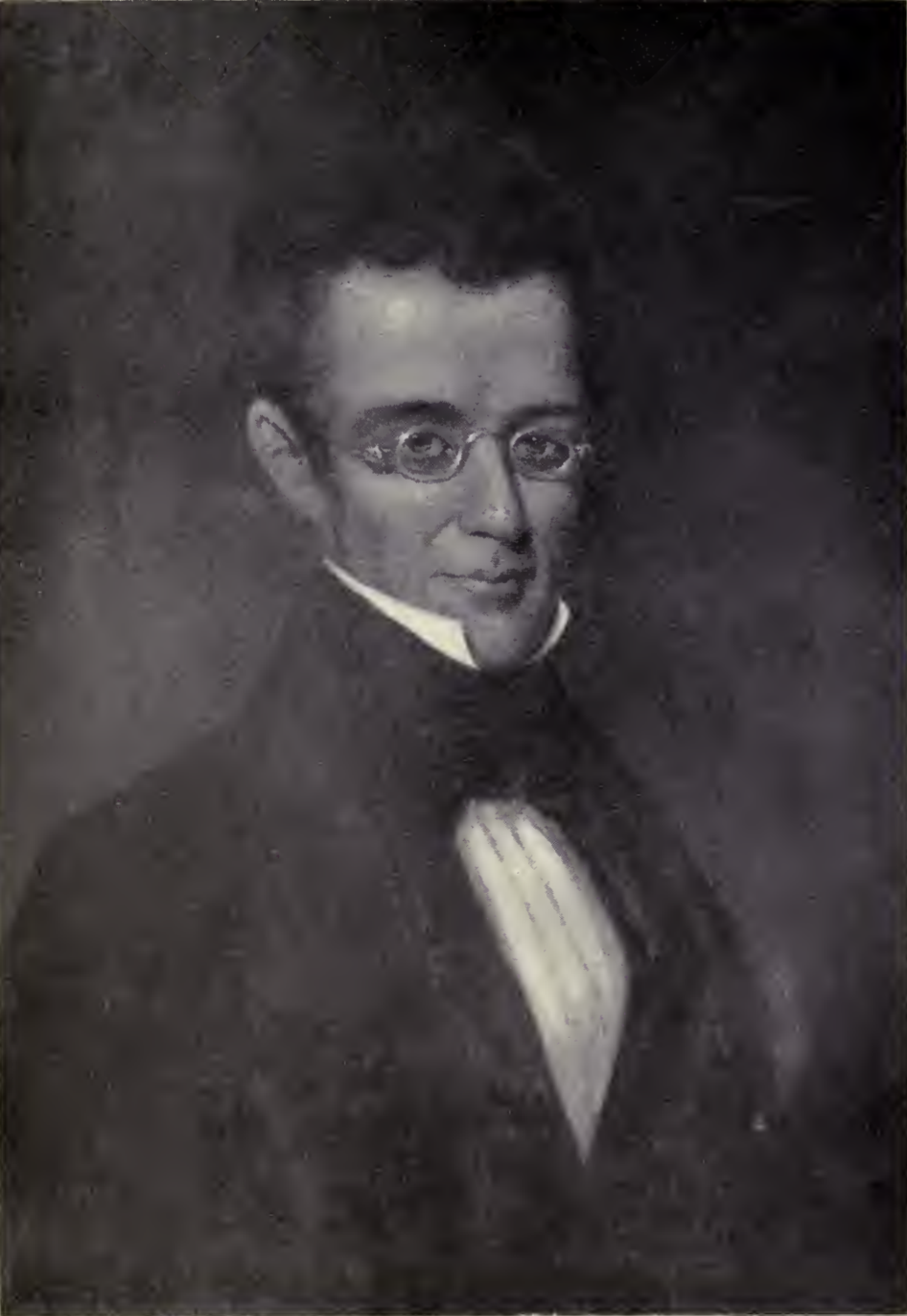
Osgood Johnson

- February 2 – Albert Sidney Johnston, American Confederate general (d. 1862)
- February 4 – Antonija Höffern, Slovene noblewoman and educator (d. 1871)
- February 15
  - Karl Friedrich Schimper, German botanist, naturalist and poet (d. 1867)
  - John Sutter, German-American pioneer (d. 1880)
- February 26 – Arnold Adolph Berthold, German physiologist, zoologist (d. 1861)
- March 12 – Guillaume de Felice, Savoy nobleman, abolitionist (d. 1871)
- March 13 – John Boyle, British politician (d. 1874)
- March 16 – Nikolay Yazykov, Russian poet, Slavophile (d. 1846)
- March 27 – Charles Lafontaine, Swiss mesmerist (d. 1892)
- April 7 – Flora Tristan, French feminist (d. 1844)
- April 18 – Charles Ferdinand Pahud, Governor-General of the Dutch East Indies (d. 1873)
- April 30
  - Jeremiah E. Cary, American politician (d. 1888)
  - Albrecht von Roon, Prime Minister of Prussia (d. 1879)
- May 12 – Justus von Liebig, German chemist (d. 1873)
- May 20 – Ann Walker, English landowner and philanthropist (d. 1854)
- May 24 – Charles Lucien Bonaparte, French naturalist, ornithologist (d. 1857)
- May 25
  - Edward Bulwer-Lytton, English novelist, playwright and politician (d. 1873)
  - Ralph Waldo Emerson, American writer (d. 1882)
- June 8 – Amalia Assur, Swedish dentist (d. 1889)
- June 24 – George James Webb, English-born composer (d. 1887)

=== July–December ===
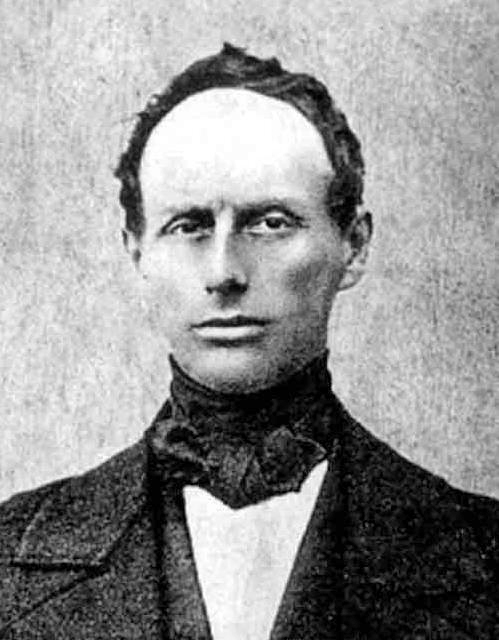
Christian Doppler

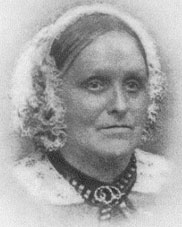
Susannah Moodie

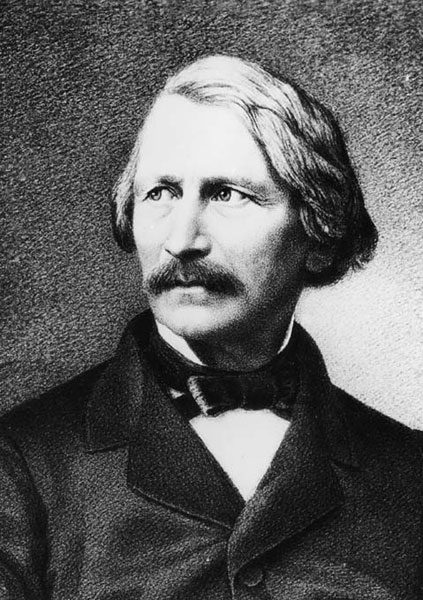
Gottfried Semper

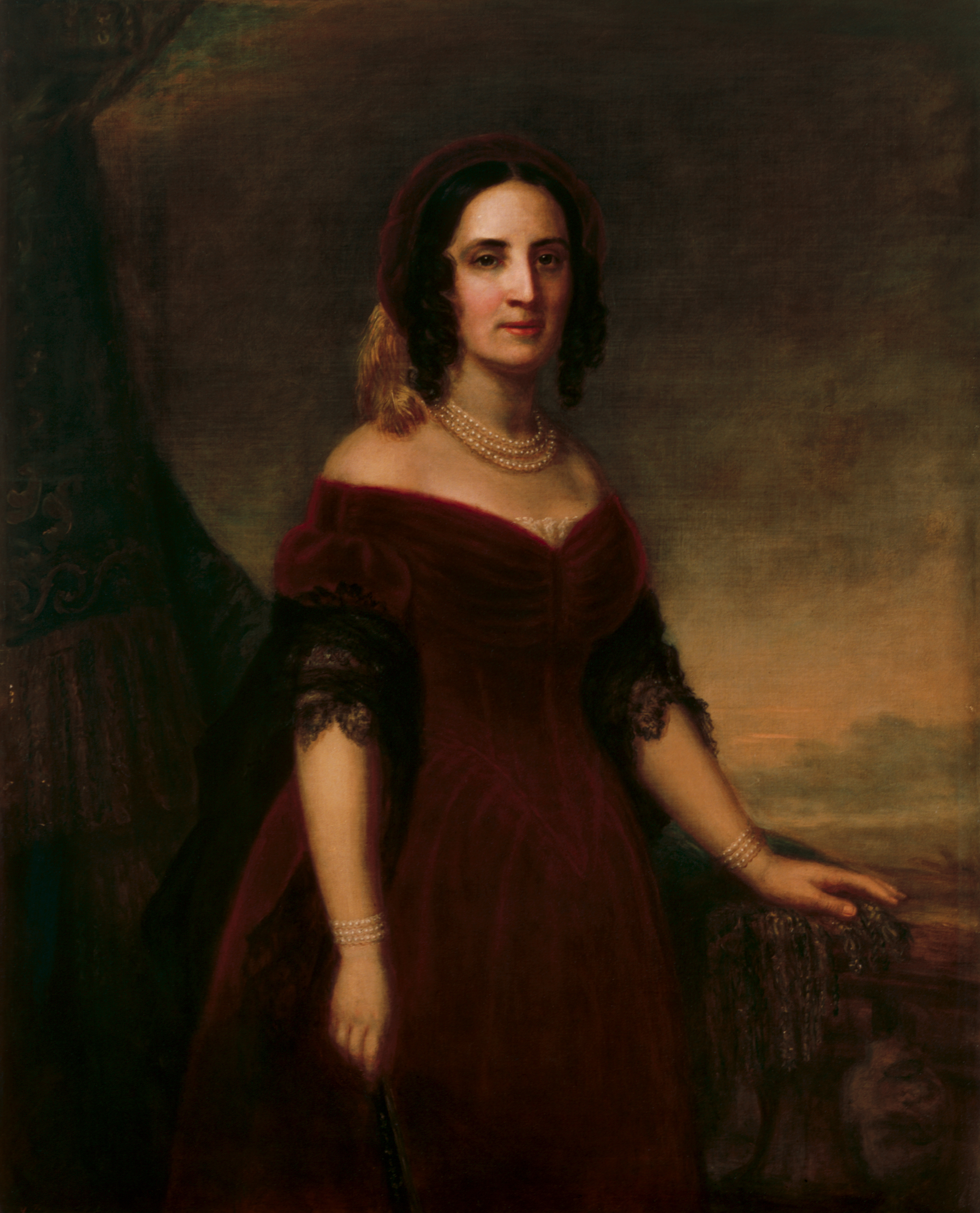
Sarah Childress Polk

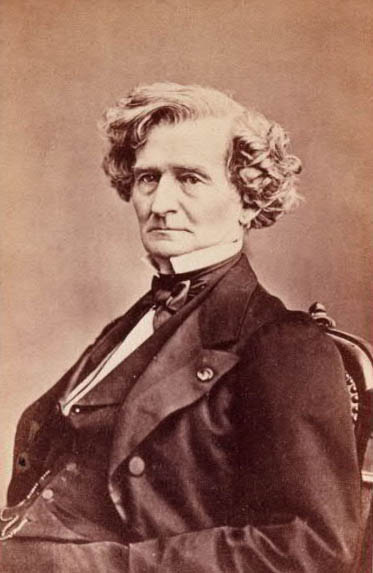
Hector Berlioz

- July 10 – William Todd (1803–1873), American businessman, Canadian senate nominee
- July 20 – John Hymers, English mathematician (d. 1887)
- July 24 – Adolphe Adam, French composer (d. 1856)
- July 31 – John Ericsson, Swedish inventor, engineer (d. 1889)
- August – Francesca Anna Canfield, American linguist, poet and translator (d. 1833)
- August 3
  - Mary Dominus, American settler of Hawaii (d. 1889)
  - Sir Joseph Paxton, English gardener, architect and Member of Parliament (d. 1865)
- August 10 – Joseph Vinoy, French general (d. 1880)
- August 13 – Vladimir Odoyevsky, Russian philosopher, writer, music critic (d. 1869)
- August 18 – Nathan Clifford, American politician, Associate Justice of the Supreme Court of the United States (d. 1881)
- August 23
  - Jan Erazim Vocel, Czech poet, archaeologist, historian and cultural revivalist (d. 1871)
  - Gustaf Wappers, Belgian painter (d. 1874)
- August 27 – Edward Beecher, American theologian (d. 1895)
- September 4
  - Anna Nielsen, Danish mezzo-soprano (d. 1856)
  - Sarah Childress Polk, First Lady of the United States (d. 1891)
- September 11 – Francisca Zubiaga y Bernales, first lady of Peru, controversial socialite (d. 1835)
- September 27 – Samuel Francis Du Pont, American admiral (d. 1865)
- September 28 – Prosper Mérimée, French writer (d. 1870)
- September 29 – Mercator Cooper, American sea captain (d. 1872)
- September 30 – Gustav von Alvensleben, Prussian general (d. 1881)
- October 5 – Friedrich Bernhard Westphal, Danish-German painter (d. 1844)
- October 16 – Robert Stephenson, English civil engineer (d. 1859)
- November 11 – Adolf von Bonin, Prussian general (d. 1872)
- November 14 – Jacob Abbott, American writer (d. 1879)
- November 29
  - Christian Doppler, Austrian mathematician (d. 1853)
  - Gottfried Semper, German architect (d. 1879)
- December 5 – Fyodor Tyutchev, great Russian Romantic poet (d. 1873)
- December 6 – Susanna Moodie, English writer (d. 1885)
- December 11 – Hector Berlioz, French composer (d. 1869)

=== Date unknown ===
- Ahmad al-Bakkai al-Kunti, West African Islamic and political leader (d. 1865)
- Barbarita Nieves, Venezuelan mistress of José Antonio Páez (d. 1847)

1804

=== January–June ===
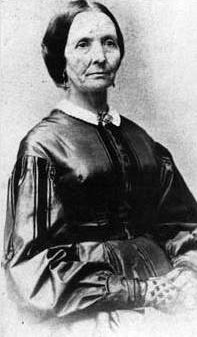
Eliza R. Snow

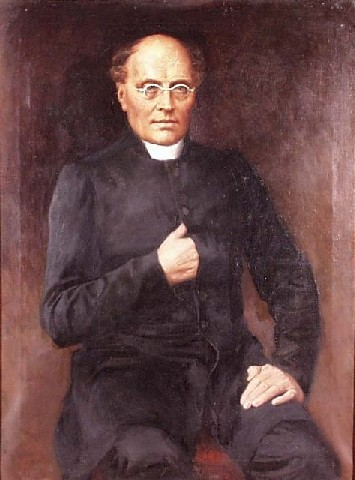
J. L. Runeberg

- January 1 – James Fannin, Texas revolutionary (d. 1836)
- January 9
  - Louis d'Aurelle de Paladines, French general (d. 1877)
  - Sydney Dacres, British admiral (d. 1884)
- January 10 – Élie Frédéric Forey, French general, Marshal of France (d. 1872)
- January 20 – Eugène Sue, French novelist (d. 1857)
- January 21 – Eliza Roxcy Snow, American poet (d. 1887)
- February 5 – J. L. Runeberg, Finnish national poet (d. 1877)
- February 7 – John Deere, American industrialist (d. 1886)
- February 13 – Claude-Étienne Minié, French army officer and weapon inventor (d. 1879)
- February 29 – Carl von Rokitansky, Czech medical doctor and pathologist (d. 1878)
- March 8 – Alvan Clark, American telescope manufacturer (d. 1887)
- March 14 – Johann Strauss Senior, Austrian composer (d. 1849)
- March 17 – Jim Bridger, American trapper and explorer (d. 1881)
- March 20 – Neal Dow, mayor of Portland, Maine and Father of Prohibition (d. 1897)
- April 3 – Lucien Baudens, French military surgeon (d. 1857)
- April 4 – Andrew Nicholl, Northern Irish painter (d. 1886)
- April 18 – Robert Davidson, Scottish locomotive pioneer (d. 1894)
- April 24 – Chō Kōran, Japanese poet, painter (d. 1879)
- April 26 – Charles Goodyear, American politician (d. 1876)
- May 4 – Margaretta Riley, British botanic (d. 1899)
- May 13 – Per Gustaf Svinhufvud af Qvalstad, treasurer of Tavastia province, manor host, and paternal grandfather of President of Finland P. E. Svinhufvud (d. 1866)
- May 16 – Elizabeth Peabody, Transcendental activist, educator (d. 1894)
- June 1
  - Mikhail Glinka, Russian composer (d. 1857)
  - George Sand, French writer (d. 1876)
- June 24 – Willard Richards, American religious leader (d. 1854)

=== July–December ===
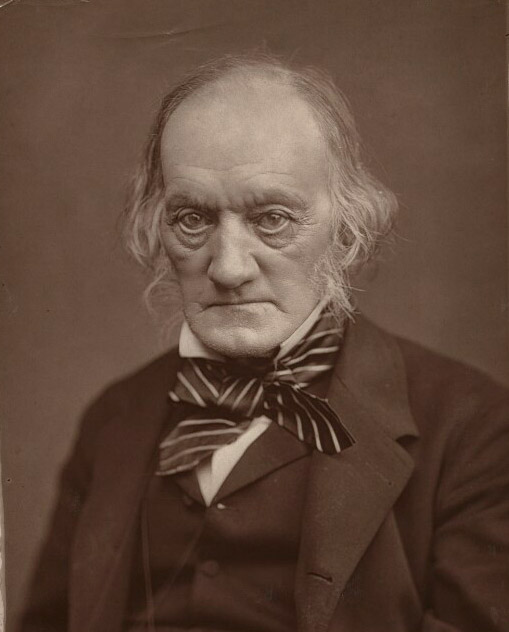
Richard Owen

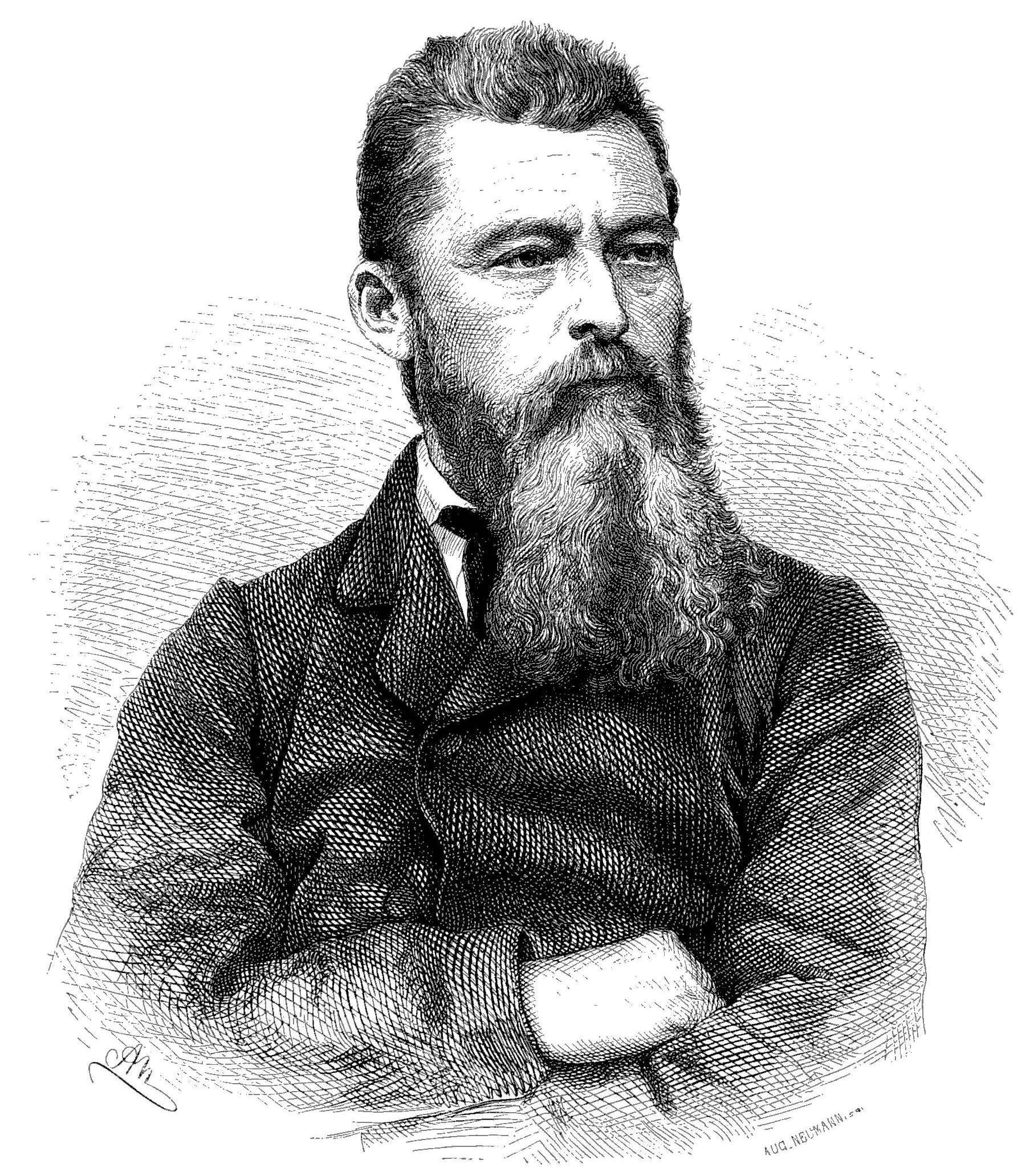
Ludwig Feuerbach

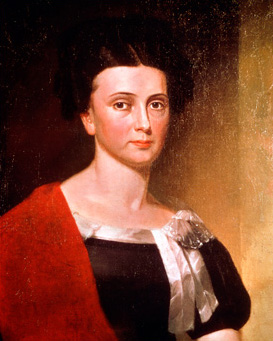
Jane Irwin Harrison

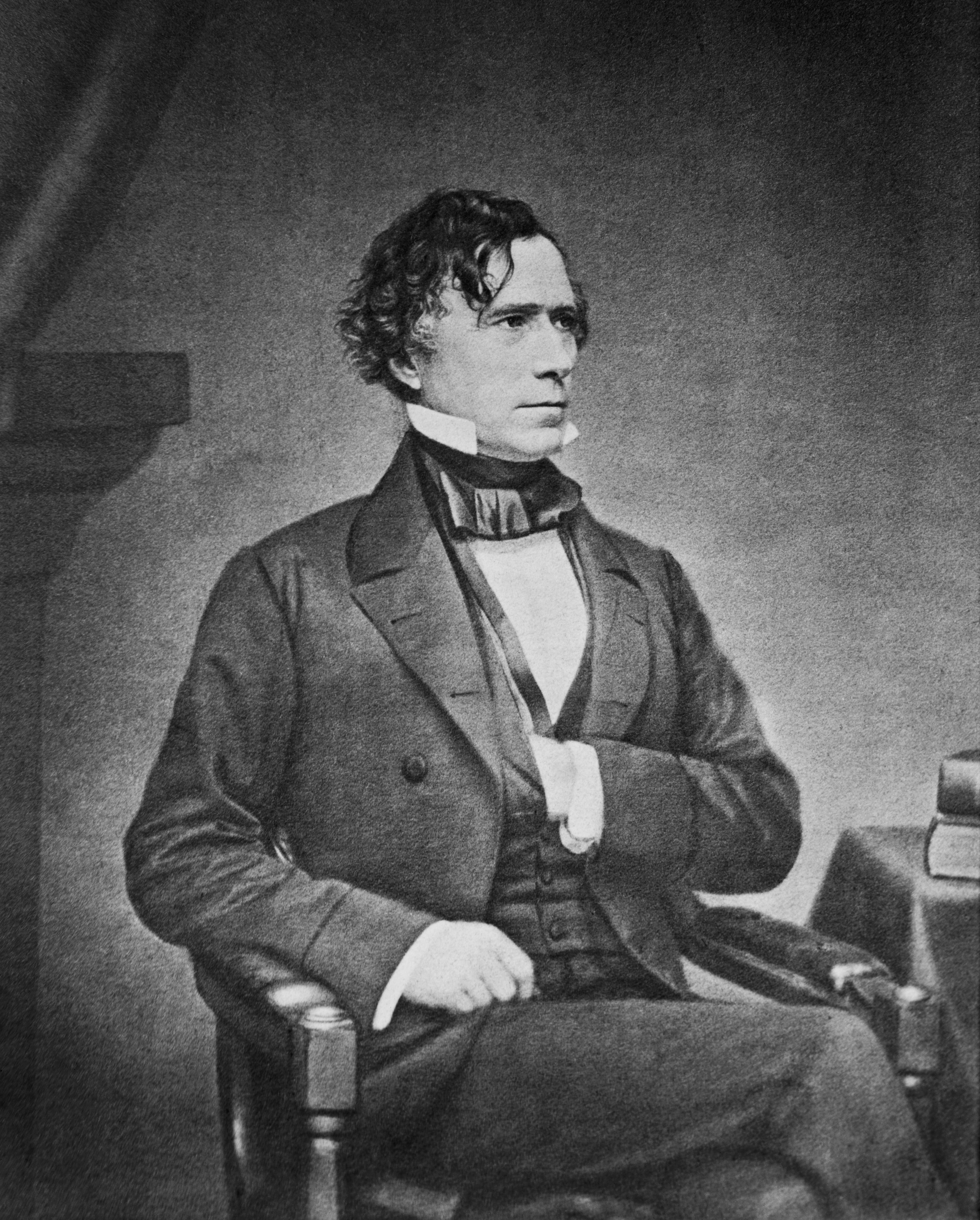
Franklin Pierce

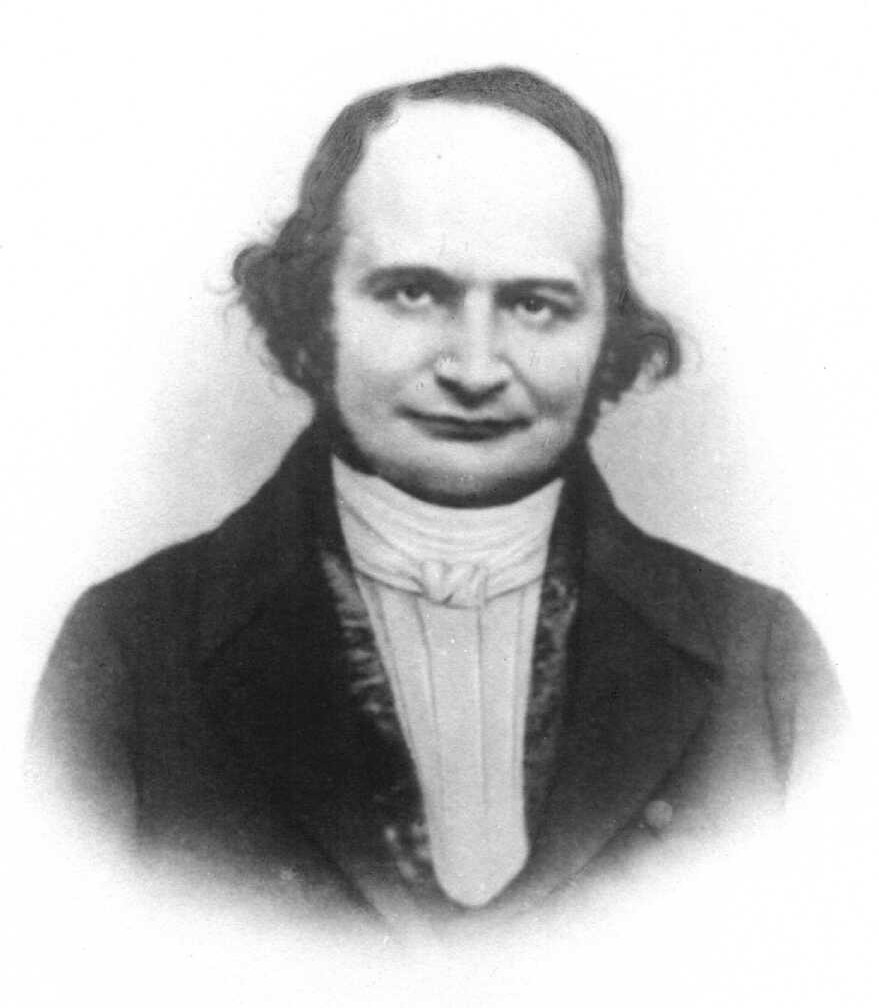
Carl Gustav Jacob Jacobi

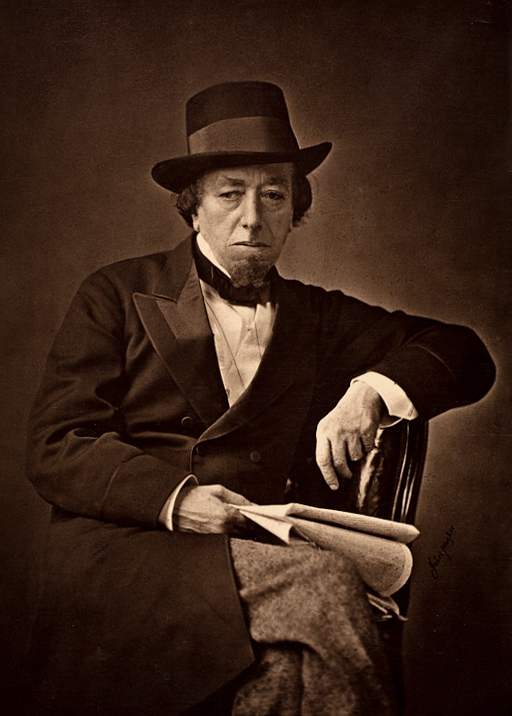
Benjamin Disraeli

- July 1 – George Sand, French novelist (d. 1876)
- July 4 – Nathaniel Hawthorne, American writer (d. 1864)
- July 6 – Jerónimo Carrión, 8th President of Ecuador (d. 1873)
- July 14 – Ludwig von Benedek, Austrian general (d. 1881)
- July 20 – Richard Owen, English anatomist, paleontologist, and zoologist (d. 1892)
- July 23 – Jane Irwin Harrison, de facto First Lady of the United States (d. 1846)
- July 28 – Ludwig Feuerbach, German philosopher (d. 1872)
- September 5 – William Alexander Graham, United States Senator from North Carolina (1840–1843), Confederate States Senator (1864–1865) (d. 1875)
- September 8 – Eduard Mörike, German poet (d. 1875)
- September 11 – Mercedes Marín del Solar, international Chilean poet and reform educator (d. 1866)
- September 14
  - Louis Désiré Maigret, Roman Catholic bishop of Honolulu (d. 1882)
  - John Gould, English ornithologist (d. 1881)
- September 28 – Alpheus Felch, American governor and senator from Michigan (d. 1896)
- October 18 – Mongkut, Rama IV, King of Siam (d. 1868)
- October 24 – Wilhelm Eduard Weber, German physicist (d. 1891)
- November 18 – Alfonso Ferrero La Marmora, Italian general and statesman (d. 1878)
- November 23 – Franklin Pierce, 14th President of the United States (d. 1869)
- December 7 – Noah Haynes Swayne, Associate Justice of the Supreme Court of the United States (d. 1884)
- December 10 – Carl Gustav Jacob Jacobi, German mathematician (d. 1851)
- December 13 – Joseph Howe, Canadian politician (d. 1873)
- December 16 – Viktor Bunyakovsky, Ukrainian-Russian mathematician (d. 1889)
- December 21 – Benjamin Disraeli, Prime Minister of the United Kingdom (1868; 1874–1880) (d. 1881)
- December 23 – Charles Augustin Sainte-Beuve, French literary critic (d. 1869)

=== Date unknown ===
- Isaac Aaron, English-born medical doctor, owner of the Australian Medical Journal and secretary of the Australian Medical Association (d. 1877)
- James Fannin, colonel in Army of the Republic of Texas and slave trader (executed 1836)
- Hortense Globensky-Prévost, Canadian heroine (d. 1873)
- Anne Hill, British-Canadian dancer and actor (d. 1896)
- Chō Kōran, Japanese poet and painter (d. 1879)
- Eugénie Luce, French educator (d. 1882)
- James Mackay, Scottish-born New Zealand politician (d. 1875)

1805

=== January–June ===
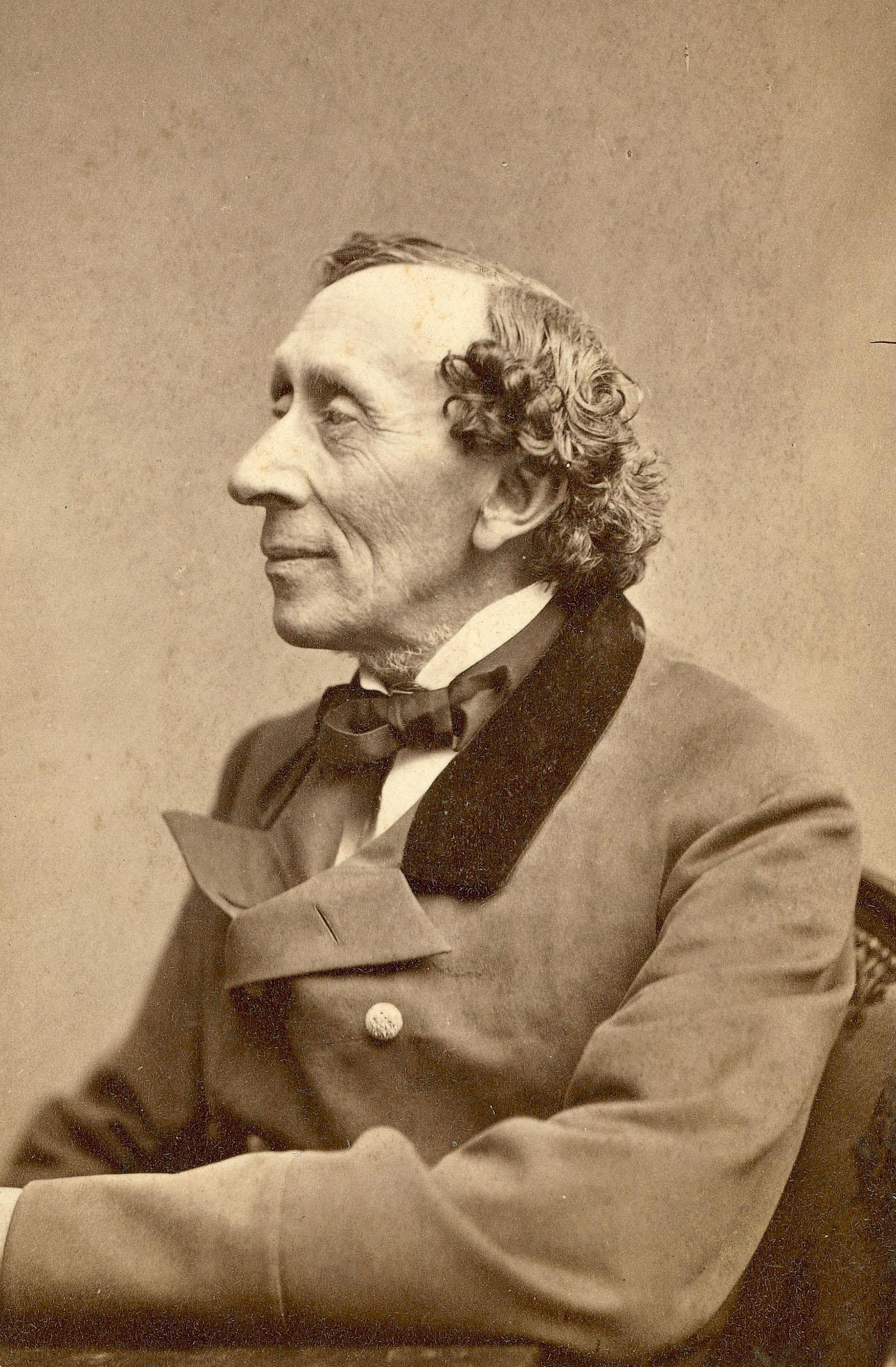
Hans Christian Andersen

- January 8 – Orson Hyde, American religious leader (d. 1878)
- January 27 – Samuel Palmer, English artist (d. 1881)
- February 13 – Peter Gustav Lejeune Dirichlet, German mathematician (d. 1859)
- February 18 – Louis M. Goldsborough, United States Navy admiral (d. 1877)
- March 3 – Jonas Furrer, first President of the Swiss Confederation (d. 1861)
- March 14 – Eduard Clam-Gallas, Austrian general (d. 1891)
- March 22 – Benito de Soto, Galician pirate (executed 1830)
- March 23 – Sears Cook Walker, American mathematician, astronomer (d. 1853)
- March 26 (alleged) – Shirali Muslimov, Azerbaijani supercentenarian (d. 1973)
- April 2 – Hans Christian Andersen, Danish writer (d. 1875)
- April 8 – Hugo von Mohl, German botanist (d. 1872)
- April 21 – James Martineau, English religious philosopher (d. 1900)
- April 22 – Benito de Soto, Galician pirate (d. 1830)
- June 9 – José Trinidad Cabañas, Honduran general, president and national hero (d. 1871)
- June 22 – Giuseppe Mazzini Italian patriot, statesman and writer (d. 1872)

=== July–December ===
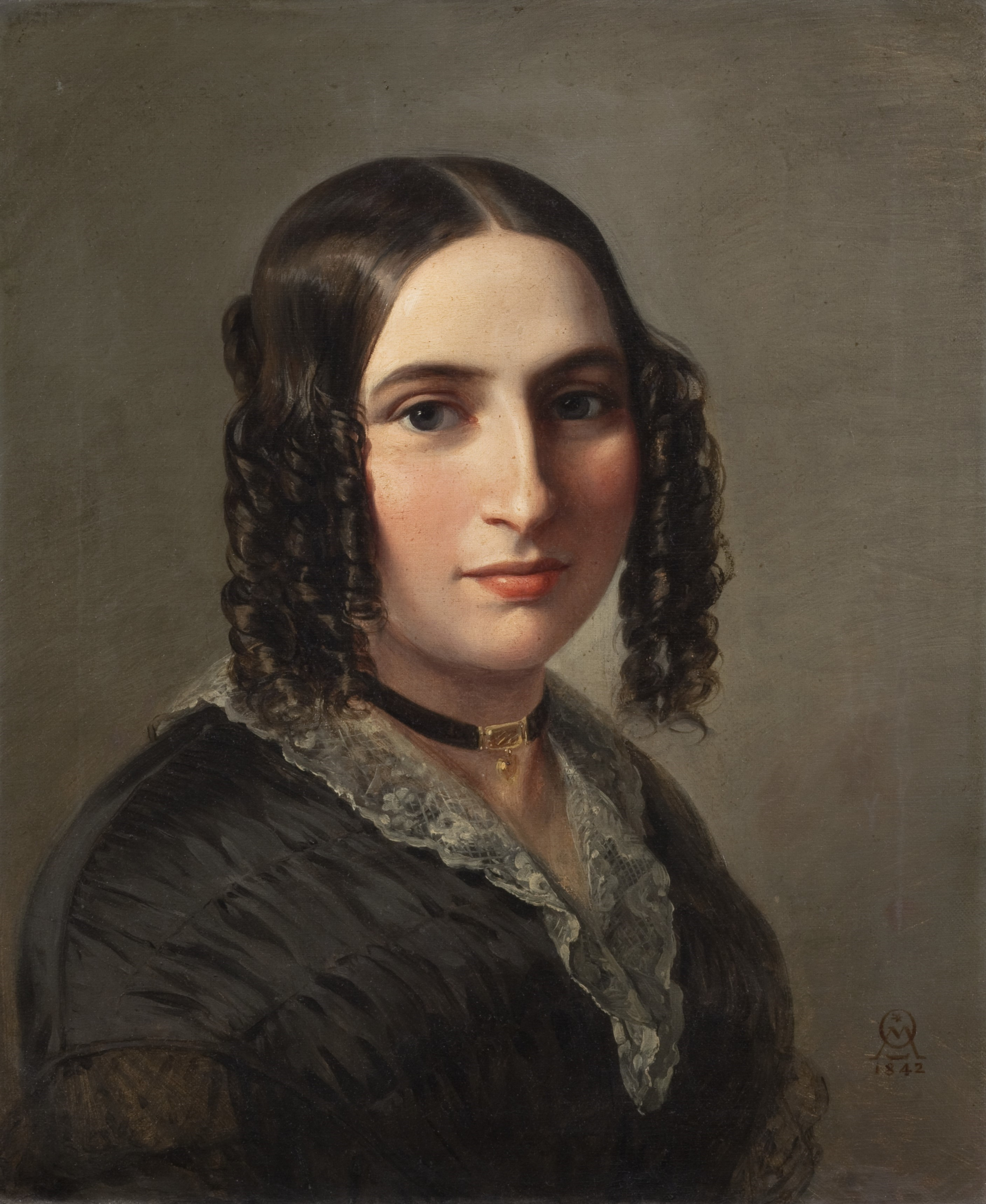
Fanny Hensel

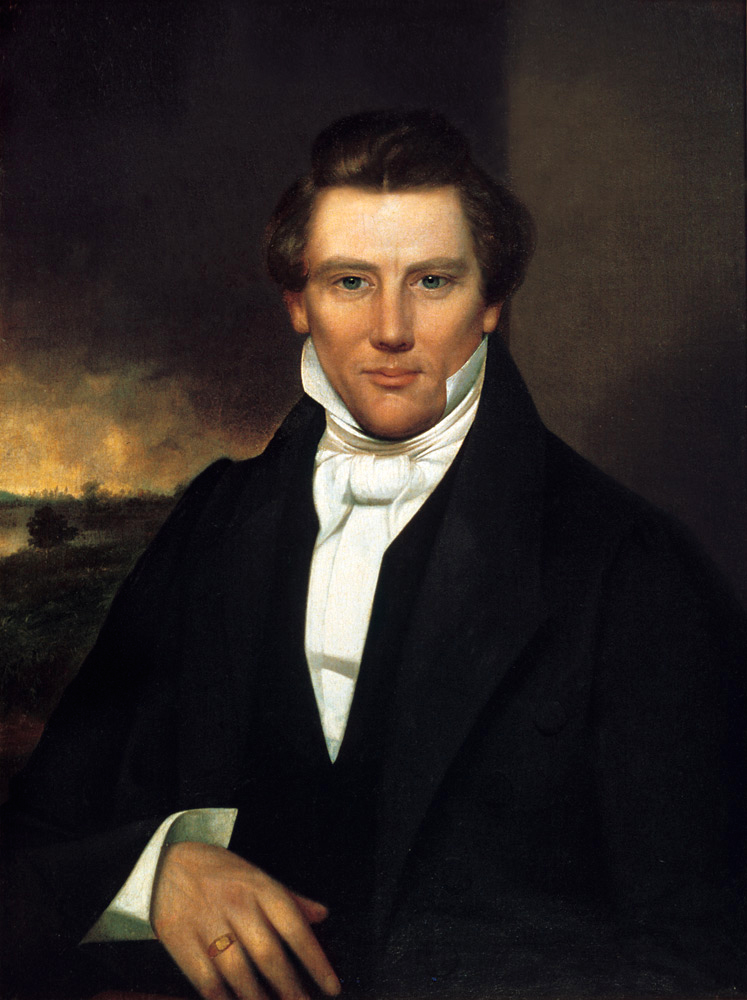
Joseph Smith

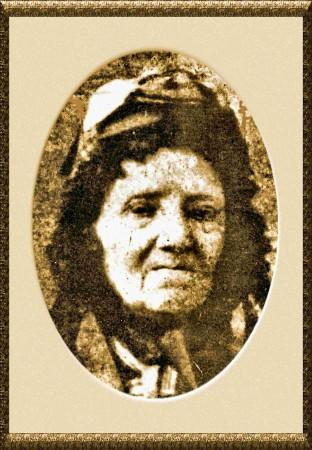
Jeanne Deroin

- July 5 – Robert FitzRoy, English meteorologist, captain and politician (d. 1865)
- July 29 – Alexis de Tocqueville, French historian (d. 1859)
- July 30 – Rudolf Wagner, German anatomist, pathologist (d. 1864)
- August 4 – William Rowan Hamilton, Irish physicist (d. 1865)
- September 19 – John Stevens Cabot Abbott, American historian, pastor and pedagogical writer (d. 1877)
- September 27 – George Müller, Prussian evangelist, founder of the New Orphan Houses, Ashley Down, Bristol in England (d. 1898)
- November 14 – Fanny Hensel, German composer, pianist (d. 1847)
- November 28 – John Lloyd Stephens, American traveler, diplomat and Mayanist archaeologist (d. 1852)
- December 2 – Cicero Price, American commodore (d. 1888)
- December 10 – William Lloyd Garrison, American abolitionist (d. 1879)
- December 12 – Henry Wells, American businessman, founder of Wells Fargo (d. 1878)
- December 22 – John Obadiah Westwood, English entomologist (d. 1893)
- December 23 – Joseph Smith, American religious leader, founder of the Latter Day Saint movement (d. 1844)
- December 31 – Jeanne Deroin, French socialist and feminist (d. 1894)

=== Undated ===
- Maiden of Ludmir, Jewish religious leader (d. 1888)
- James Pratt, last of two men to be executed in UK for homosexuality (d. 1835)
- Cochise, Indigenous American (Apache) leader (d. 1874)
- Jesse Chisholm, Indigenous American (Cherokee) fur trader and merchant (d. 1868)

1806

=== January–June ===
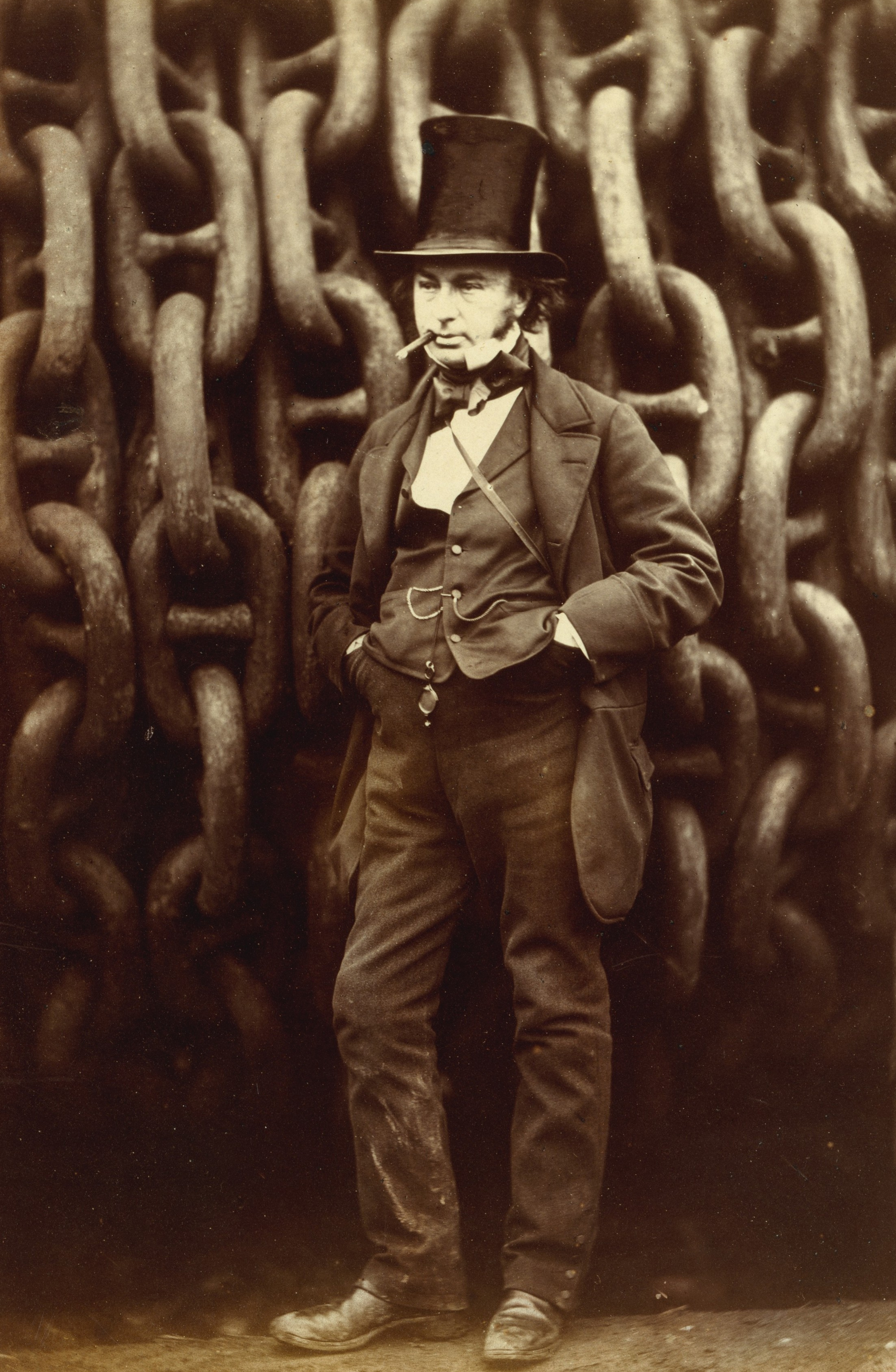
Isambard Kingdom Brunel

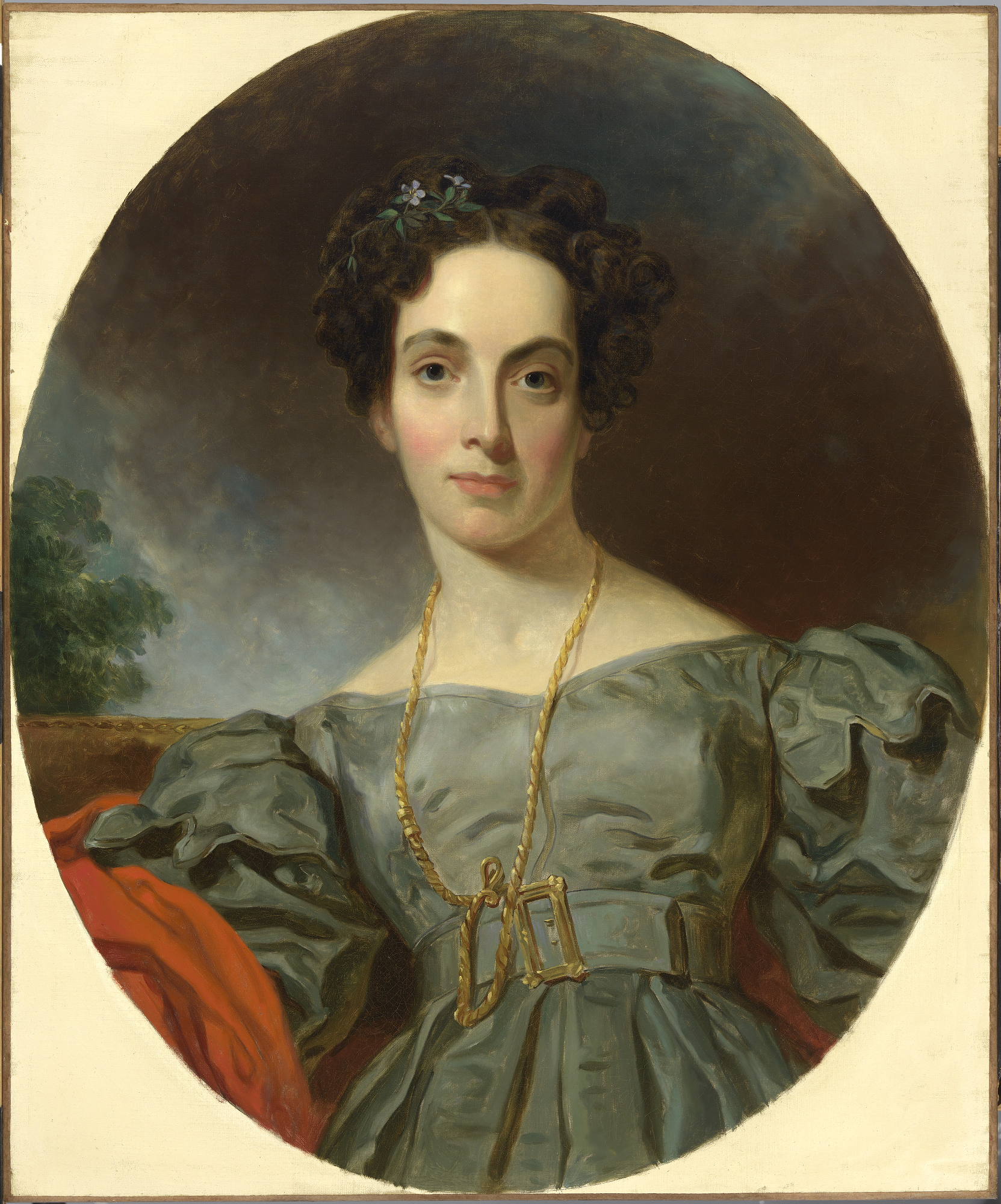
Emma Catherine Embury

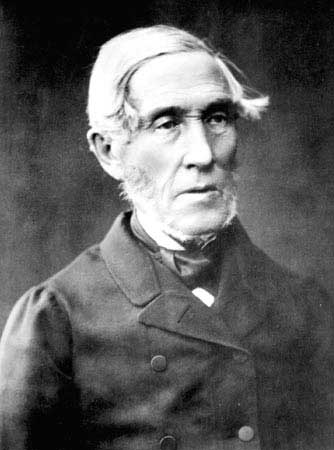
J. V. Snellman

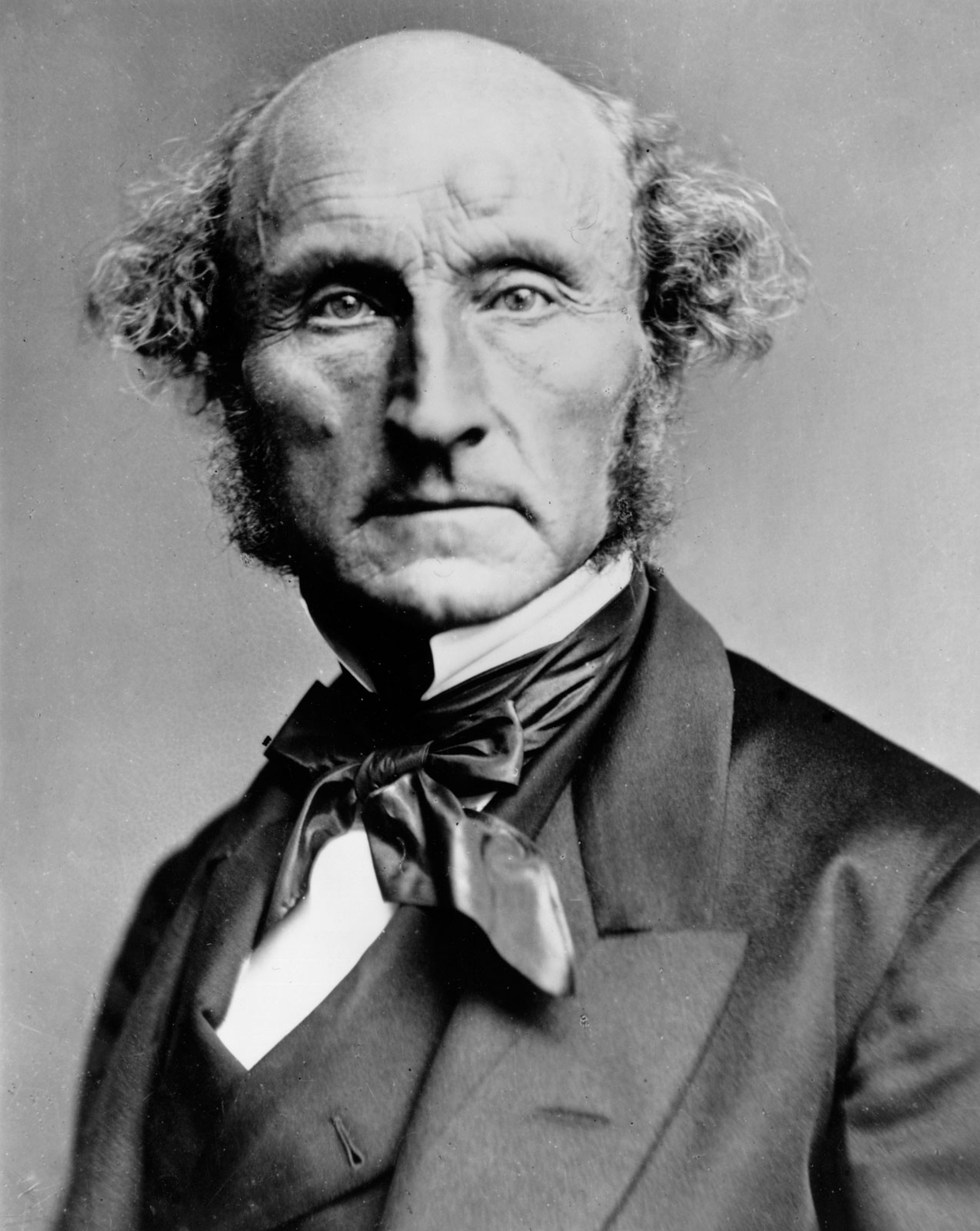
John Stuart Mill

- January 1 – Lionel Kieseritzky, Baltic-German chess player (d. 1853)
- January 27 – Juan Crisóstomo Arriaga, Spanish composer (d. 1826)
- February 22 – Józef Kremer, Polish messianic philosopher (d. 1875)
- March 4
  - Ephraim Wales Bull, American farmer, creator of the Concord grape (d. 1895)
  - George Bradburn, American abolitionist, women's rights advocate (d. 1880)
- March 6 – Elizabeth Barrett Browning, English poet (d. 1861)
- March 11 – Carlo Pellion di Persano, Italian admiral, politician (d. 1883)
- March 12 – Jane Pierce, First Lady of the United States (d. 1863)
- March 21 – Benito Juárez, Mexican statesman, folk hero (d. 1872)
- March 28 – Ludolph Anne Jan Wilt Sloet van de Beele, Governor-General of the Dutch East Indies (d. 1890)
- April 3 – Ivan Kireyevsky, Russian literary critic, philosopher (d. 1856)
- April 6 – Friedrich Wilhelm Ritschl, German scholar (d. 1876)
- April 9 – Isambard Kingdom Brunel, British civil engineer (d. 1859)
- May 2 – Catherine Labouré, French visionary, saint (d. 1876)
- May 4 – William Fothergill Cooke, English inventor (d. 1879)
- May 12 – J. V. Snellman, Finnish statesman and influential Fennoman philosopher (d. 1881)
- May 20 – John Stuart Mill, British philosopher (d. 1873)
- June 12 – John Augustus Roebling, German-American engineer (d. 1869)
- June 27 – Augustus De Morgan, British mathematician, logician (d. 1871)

=== July–December ===
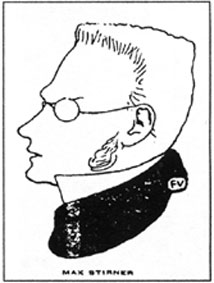
Max Stirner

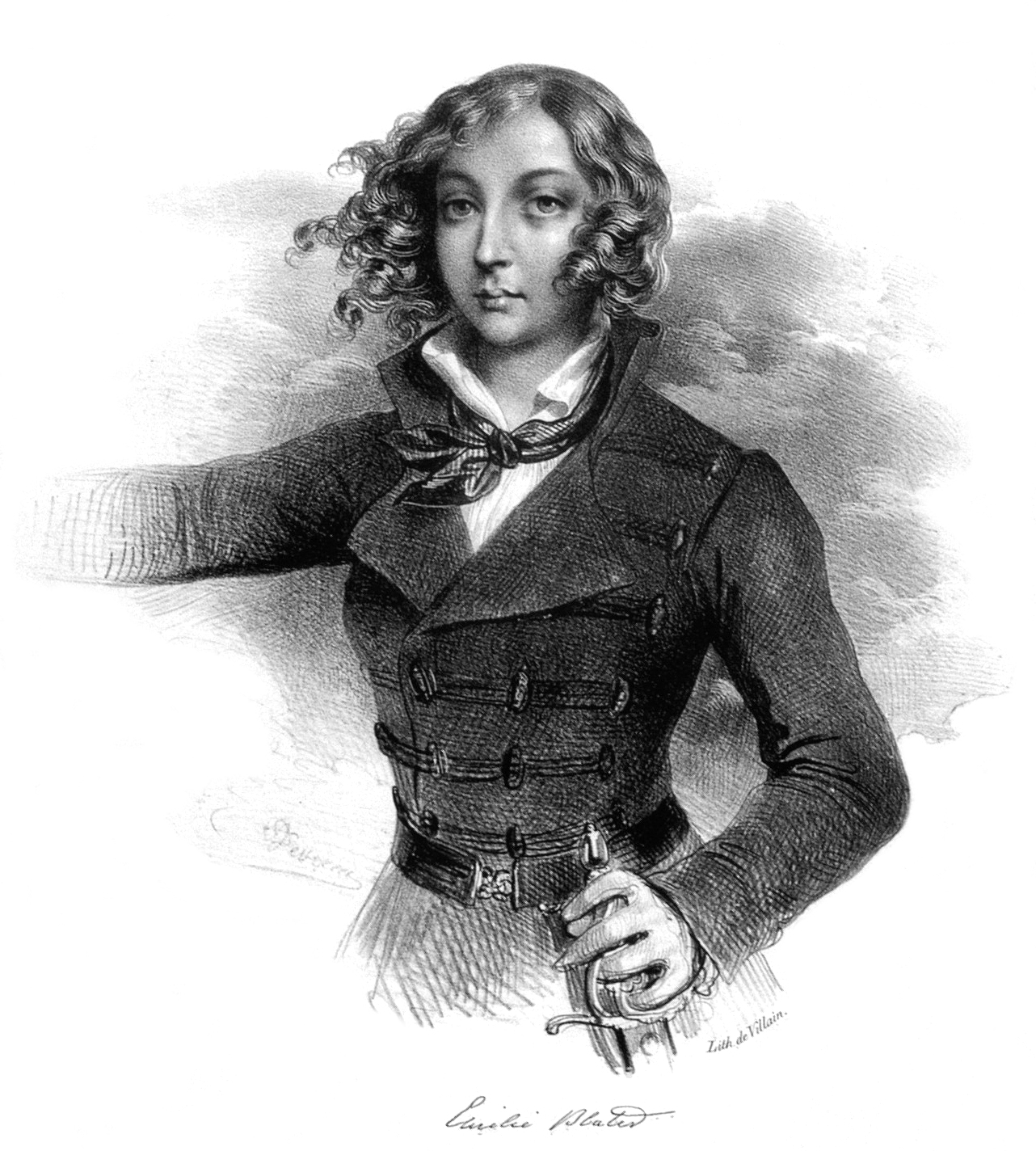
Emilia Plater

- July 5
  - James Dawson, Scottish-born Australian settler, champion of aboriginal interests (d. 1900)
  - Blanka Teleki, Hungarian countess, women's rights activist (d. 1862)
- September 12 – Andrew Hull Foote, American admiral (d. 1863)
- September 22 – Bernardino António Gomes, Portuguese physician and naturalist (d. 1877)
- October 3 – Oliver Cowdery, American religious leader (d. 1850)
- October 25 – Max Stirner, German philosopher (d. 1856)
- November 10 – Sir Alexander Milne, British admiral (d. 1896)
- November 13 – Emilia Plater, Polish heroine (d. 1831)
- December 11 – Otto Wilhelm Hermann von Abich, German geologist (d. 1886)

1807

=== January–June ===
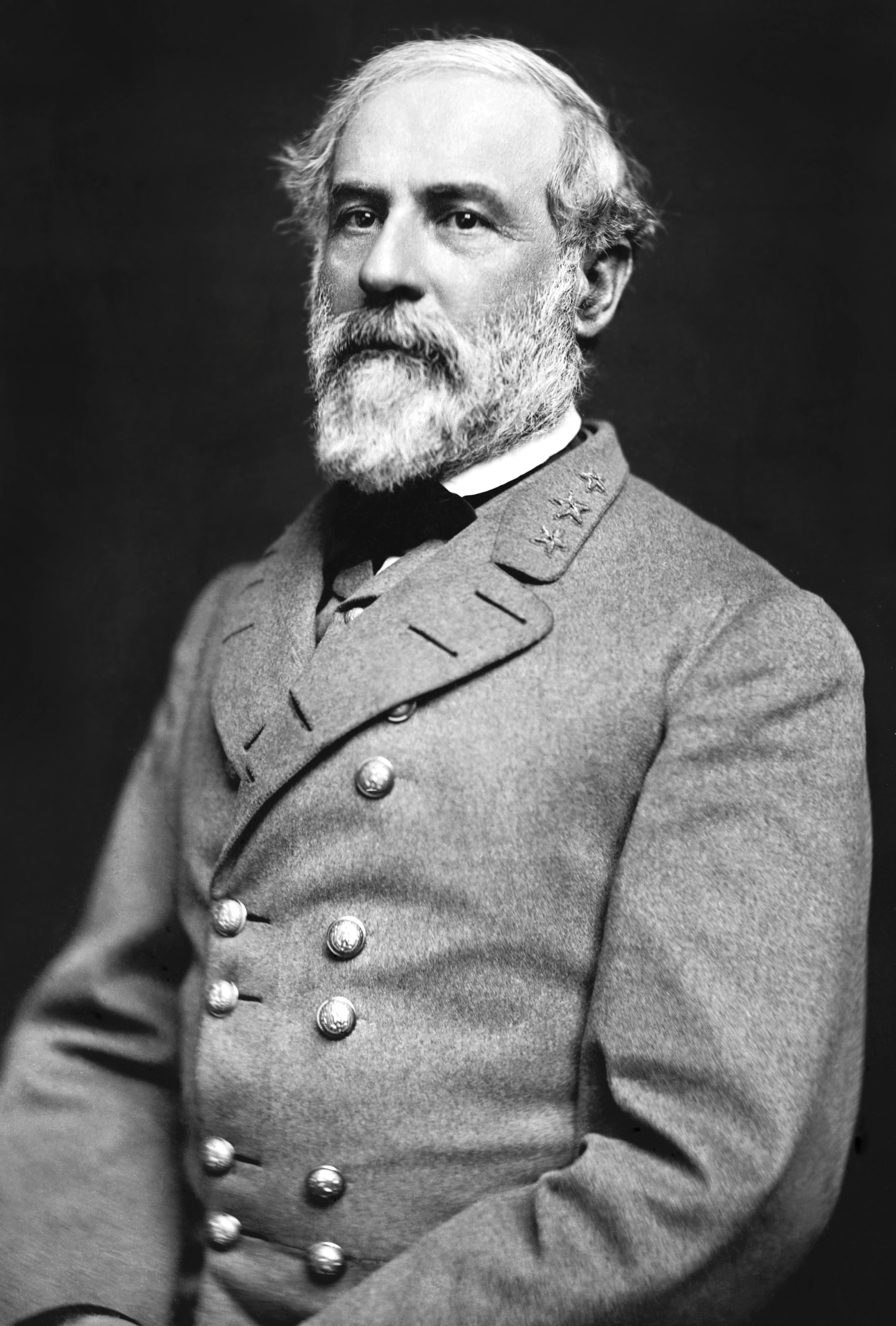
Robert E. Lee

- January 13 – Napoleon Bonaparte Buford, American general, railroad executive (d. 1883)
- January 19 – Robert E. Lee, American Confederate general (d. 1870)
- January 28 – Robert McClure, Irish-born Arctic explorer (d. 1873)
- February 10 – Lajos Batthyány, 1st Prime Minister of Hungary (d. 1849)
- February 27 – Henry Wadsworth Longfellow, American poet (d. 1882)
- March 1 – Wilford Woodruff, American religious leader (d. 1898)
- March 14 – Josephine of Leuchtenberg, Queen of Sweden and Norway (d. 1876)
- April 2 – William F. Packer, American politician (d. 1870)
- April 3 – Jane Digby, English adventurer (d. 1881)
- April 20 – John Milton, Governor of Florida (d. 1865)
- April 26 – Charles Auguste Frossard, French general (d. 1875)
- May 28 – Louis Agassiz, Swiss-born zoologist and geologist (d. 1873)
- June 6 – Adrien-François Servais, Belgian musician (d. 1866)
- June 16 – John Westcott, American surveyor and politician (d. 1888)

=== July–December ===
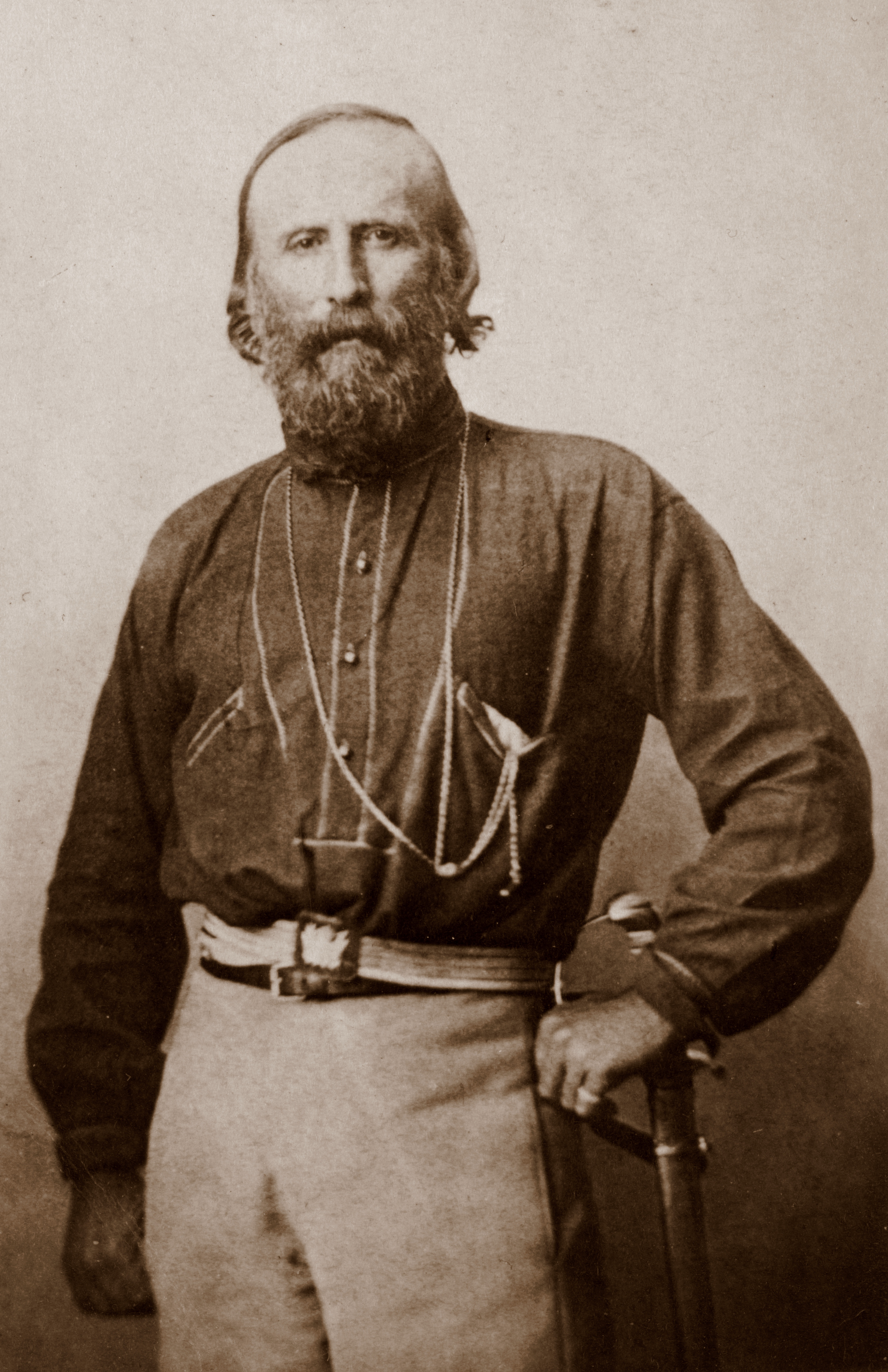
Giuseppe Garibaldi

- July 4 – Giuseppe Garibaldi, Italian patriot (d. 1882)
- August 11 – David Rice Atchison, American politician (d. 1886)
- August 15 – Jules Grévy, 4th President of France (d. 1891)
- August 18 – Charles Francis Adams Sr., American historical editor, politician and diplomat (d. 1886)
- September 2 – Fredrika Runeberg, Finnish writer (d. 1879)
- September 7 – Henry Sewell, 1st Premier of New Zealand (d. 1879)
- September 16 – John Lenthall, American naval architect and shipbuilder (d. 1882)
- October 8 – Harriet Taylor, English philosophical writer (d. 1858)
- October 26 – Barbu Catargiu, 1st Prime Minister of Romania (d. 1862)
- October 29 – Anđeo Kraljević, Herzegovinian Catholic bishop (d. 1879)
- October 30 – Christopher Wordsworth, Bishop of Lincoln (d. 1885)
- November 16 – Eduard von Fransecky, Prussian general (d. 1890)
- December 8 – Friedrich Traugott Kützing, German pharmacist, botanist and phycologist (d. 1893)
- December 17 – John Greenleaf Whittier, American Quaker poet and abolitionist (d. 1892)

1808

=== January–June ===
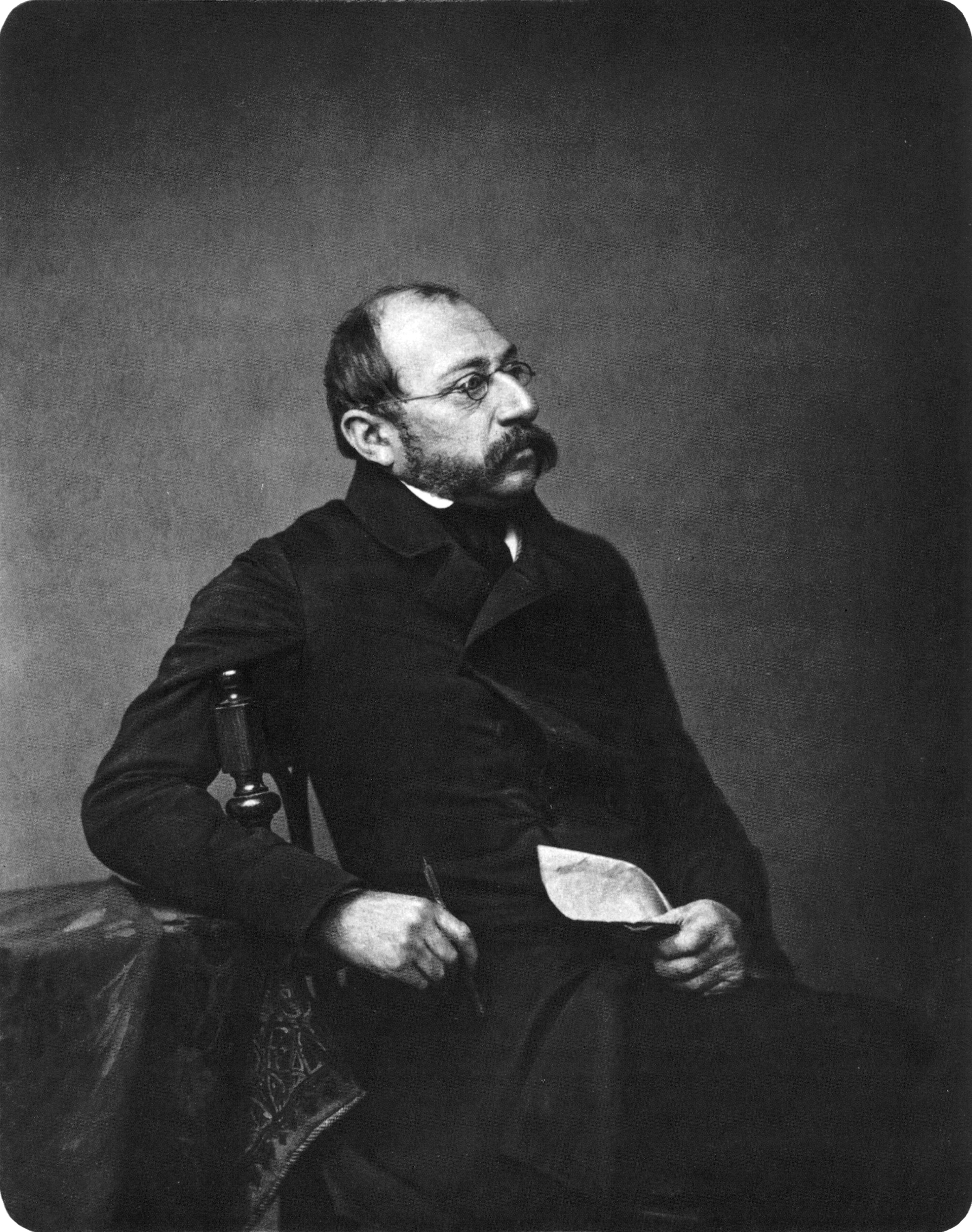
Carl Spitzweg

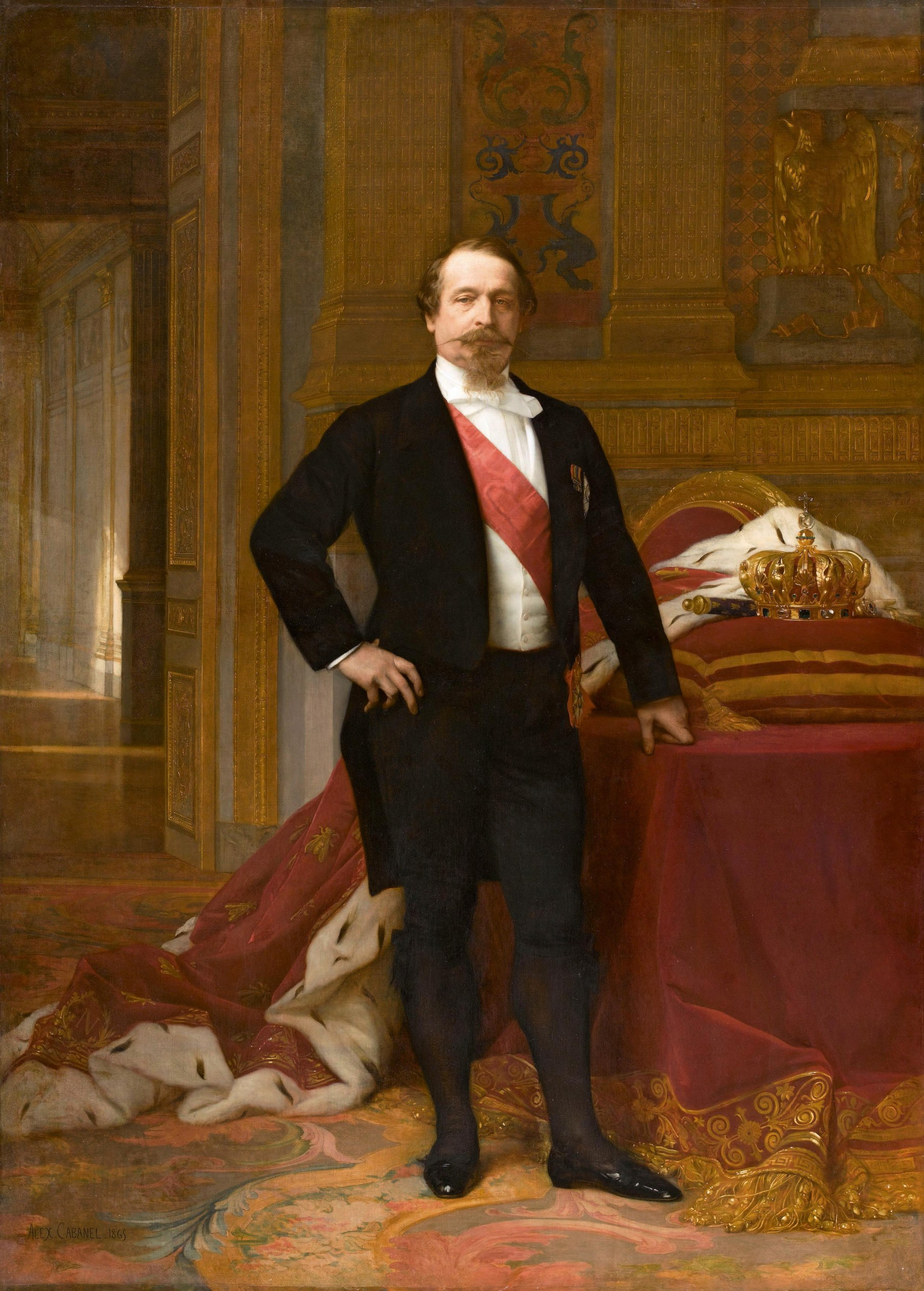
Napoleon III

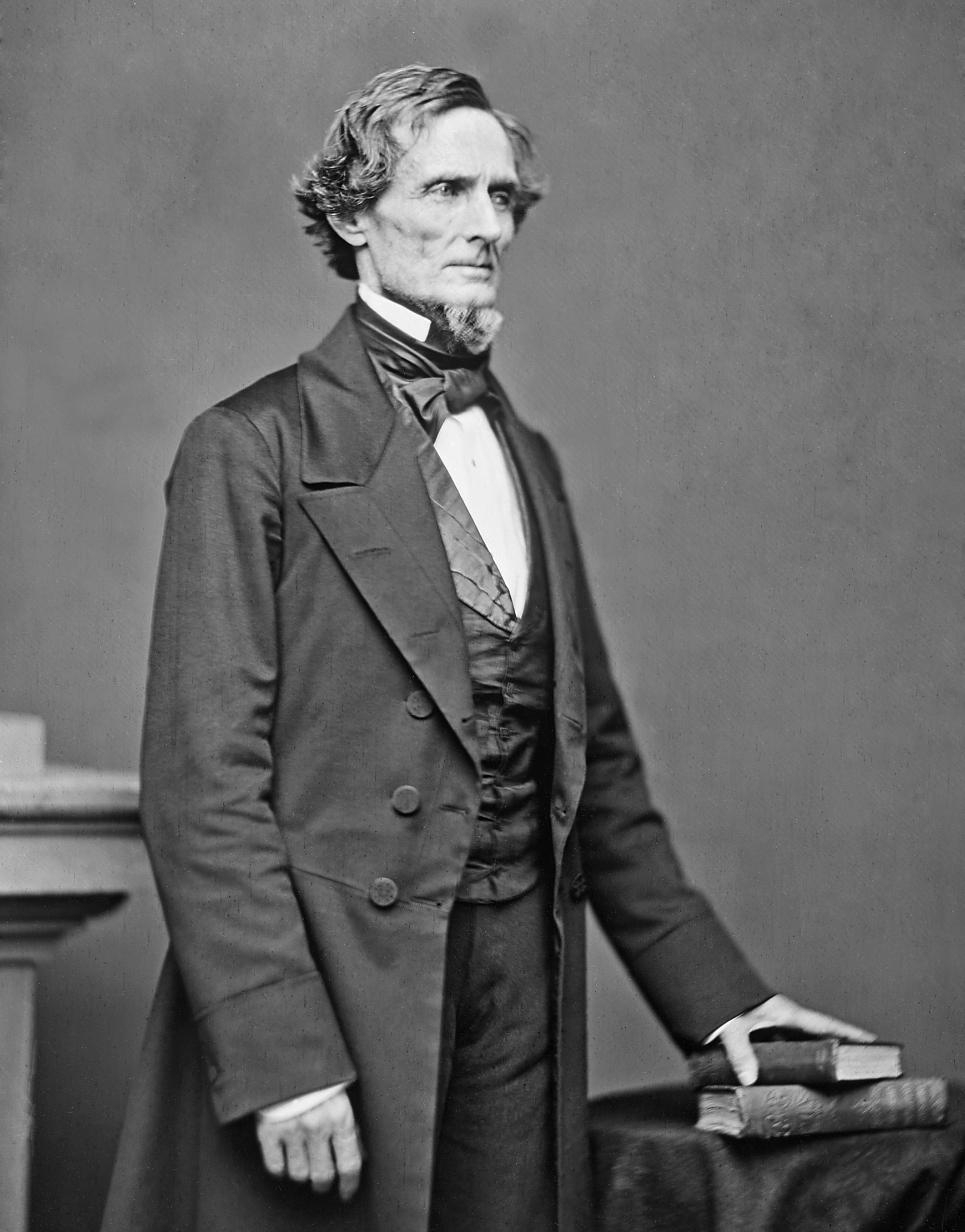
Jefferson Davis

- January 6 – Joseph Pitty Couthouy, American naval officer and paleontologist (d. 1864)
- January 13 – Salmon P. Chase, American politician, Chief Justice of the United States (d. 1873)
- January 19 – Lysander Spooner, American philosopher (d. 1887)
- January 27 – David Strauss, German theologian (d. 1874)
- February 5 – Carl Spitzweg, German painter (d. 1885)
- February 26 – Honoré Daumier, French painter, illustrator and sculptor (d. 1879)
- March 1 – Edward "Ned" Kendall, American bandleader, instrumentalist (keyed bugle) (d. 1861)
- March 17 – Pierre-Louis Dietsch, French composer, conductor (d. 1865)
- March 19 – José María Urvina, 5th President of Ecuador (d. 1891)
- March 22 – Caroline Norton, née Sheridan, English social reformer and author (d. 1877)
- March 24 – Maria Malibran, née García, Spanish-French operatic singer (d. 1836)
- April 13 – Antonio Meucci, Italian-born inventor (d. 1889)
- April 20 – Napoleon III, Emperor of the French (d. 1873)
- May 6 – William Strong, American politician, Associate Justice of the Supreme Court of the United States (d. 1895)
- May 9 – John Scott Russell, Scottish civil engineer (d. 1882)
- May 18 – Venancio Flores, general, president of Uruguay (d. 1868)
- May 21 – David de Jahacob Lopez Cardozo, Dutch Talmudist (d. 1890)
- May 22 – Gérard de Nerval, French writer (d. 1855)
- May 30 – Caroline Chisholm, Australian humanitarian (d. 1877)
- June 3 – Jefferson Davis, President of the Confederate States (d. 1889)
- June 13 – Patrice de MacMahon, Duke of Magenta, French general and politician, first president of the Third Republic (1875–1879) (d. 1893)
- June 16 – James Frederick Ferrier, Scottish metaphysical writer and philosopher (d. 1864)
- June 17 – Henrik Wergeland, Norwegian author (d. 1845)
- June 20 – Samson Raphael Hirsch, German rabbi (d. 1888)

=== July–December ===
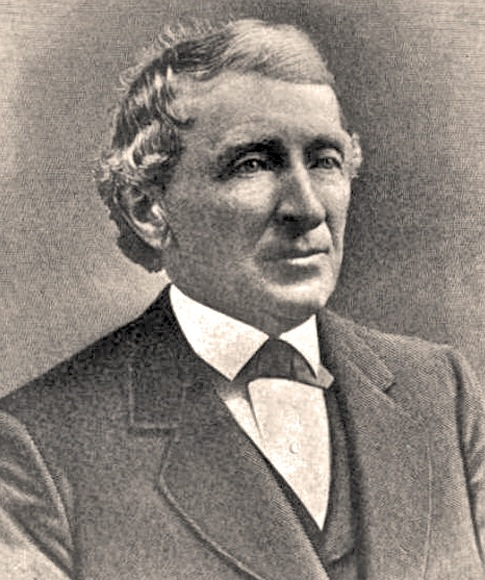
Jesse W. Fell

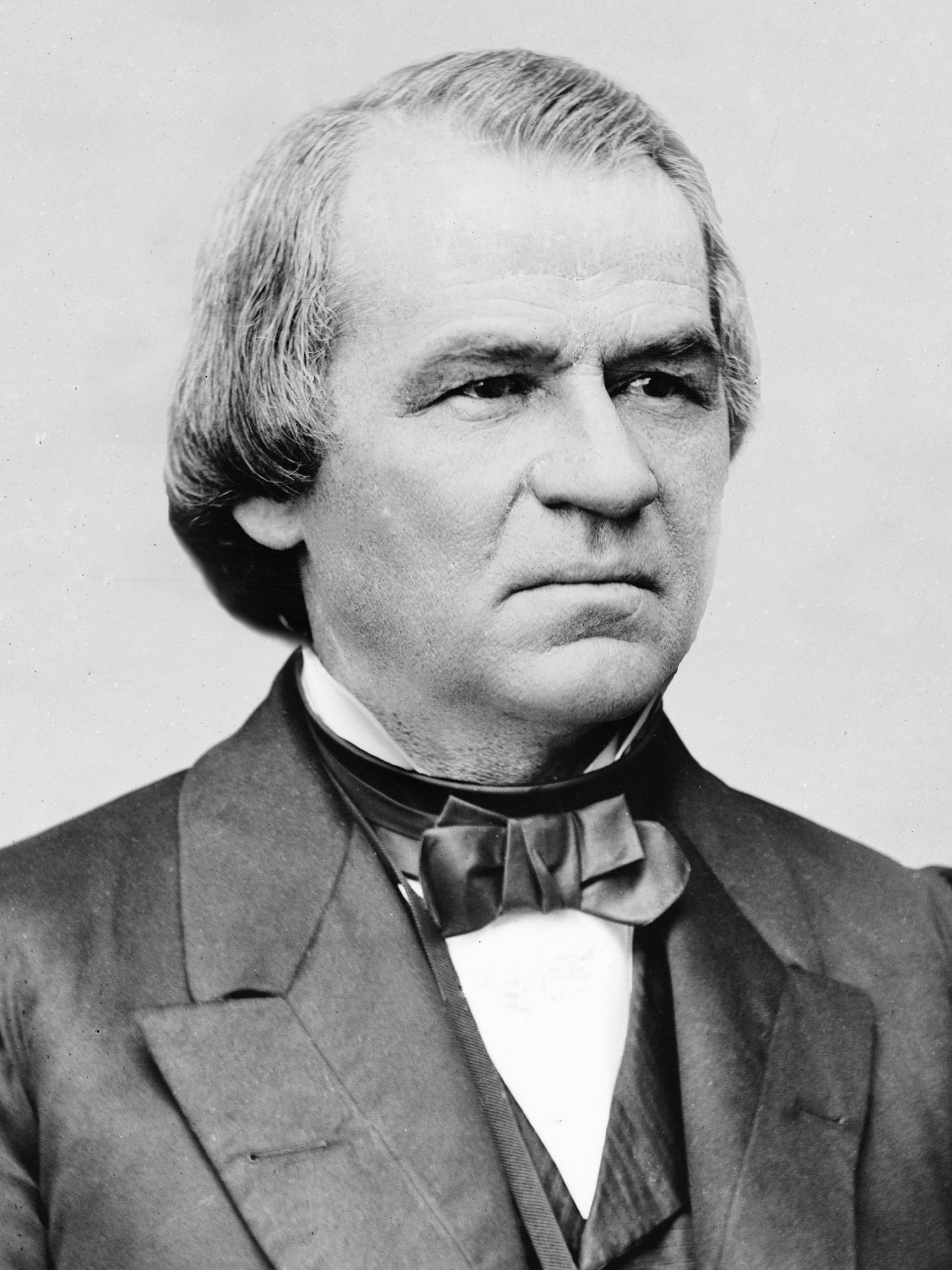
Andrew Johnson

- July 9 – Alexander William Doniphan, American lawyer, military leader (d. 1887)
- July 16 – Daniel Wells Jr., American politician (d. 1902)
- September 7 – William Lindley, English sanitary engineer (d. 1900)
- September 9 – Wendela Hebbe, Swedish journalist (d. 1899)
- September 12 – August von Werder, Prussian general (d. 1887)
- September 15 – John Hutton Balfour, Scottish botanist (d. 1884)
- September 29 – Henry Bennett, American politician (d. 1868)
- October 6 – King Frederick VII of Denmark (d. 1863)
- October 20 – Karl Andree, German geographer (d. 1875)
- November 1 – John Taylor, American Mormon leader (d. 1887)
- November 2 – Jules Amédée Barbey d'Aurevilly, French writer (d. 1889)
- November 6 – Friedrich Julius Richelot, German mathematician (d. 1875)
- November 10 – Jesse W. Fell, American businessman and landowner (d. 1887)
- November 29 – William F. Johnston, American politician (d. 1872)
- December 29 – Andrew Johnson, 17th President of the United States (d. 1875)

1809

=== January–June ===
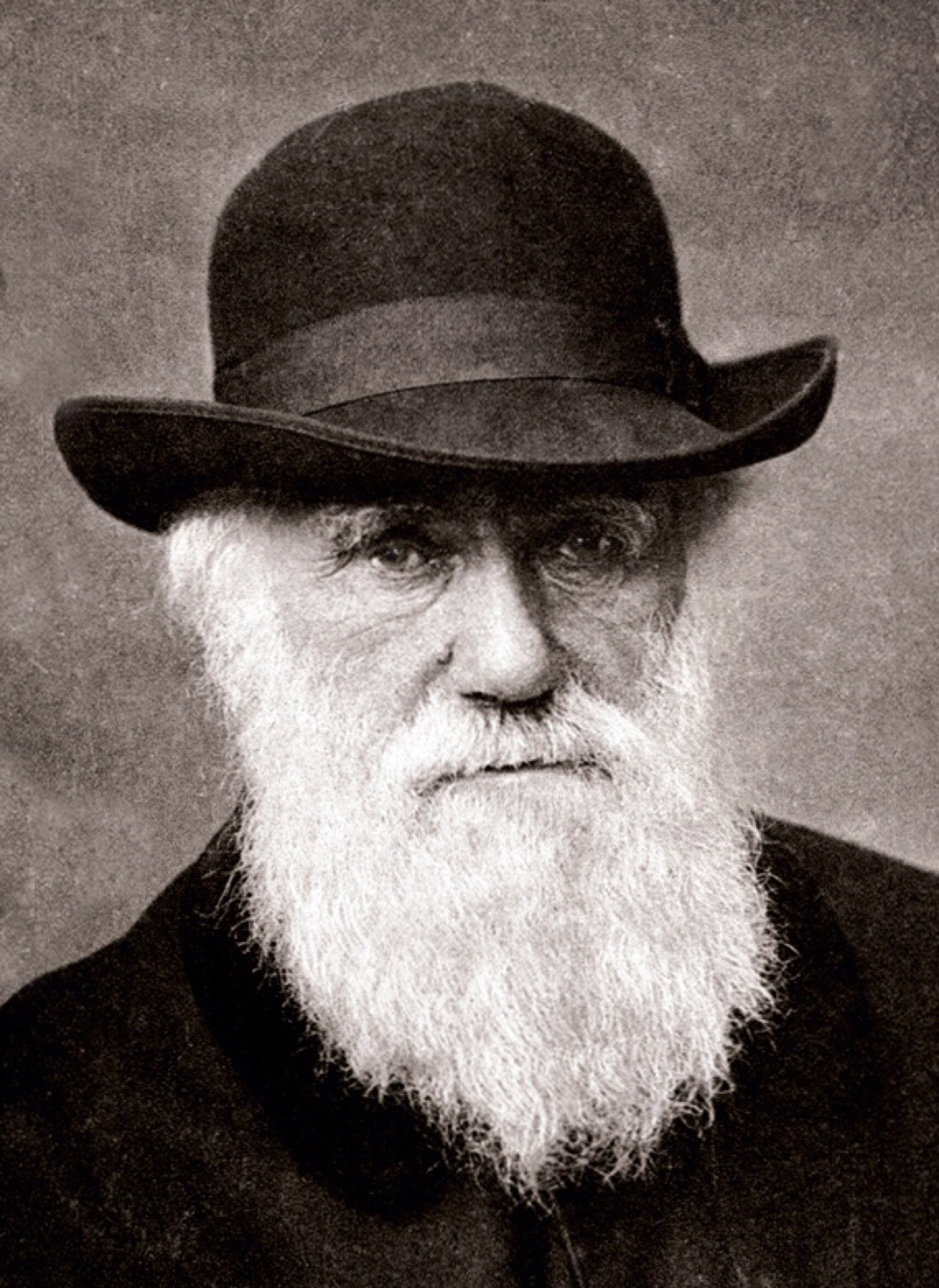
Abraham Lincoln and Charles Darwin, b. February 12, 1809

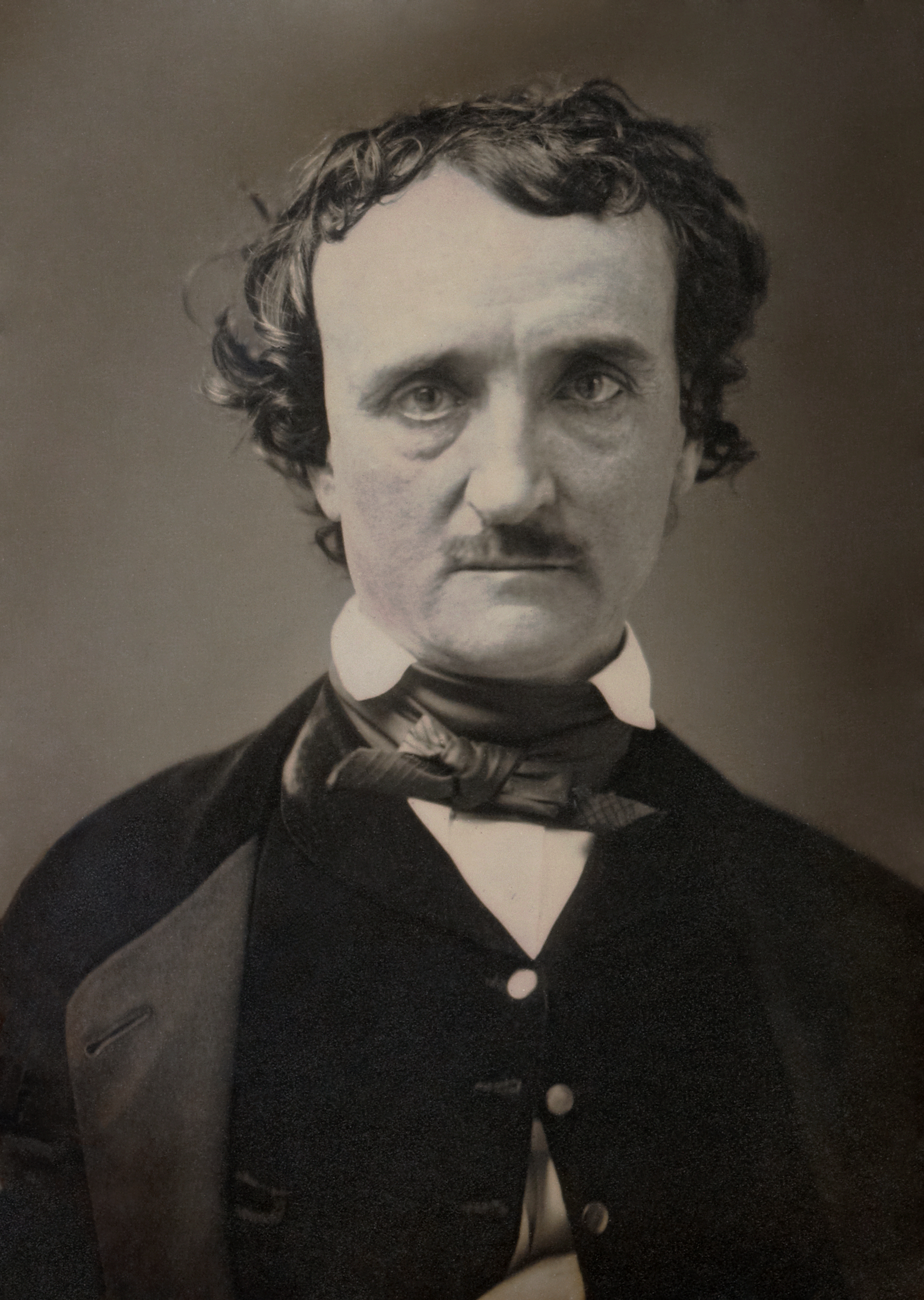
Edgar Allan Poe

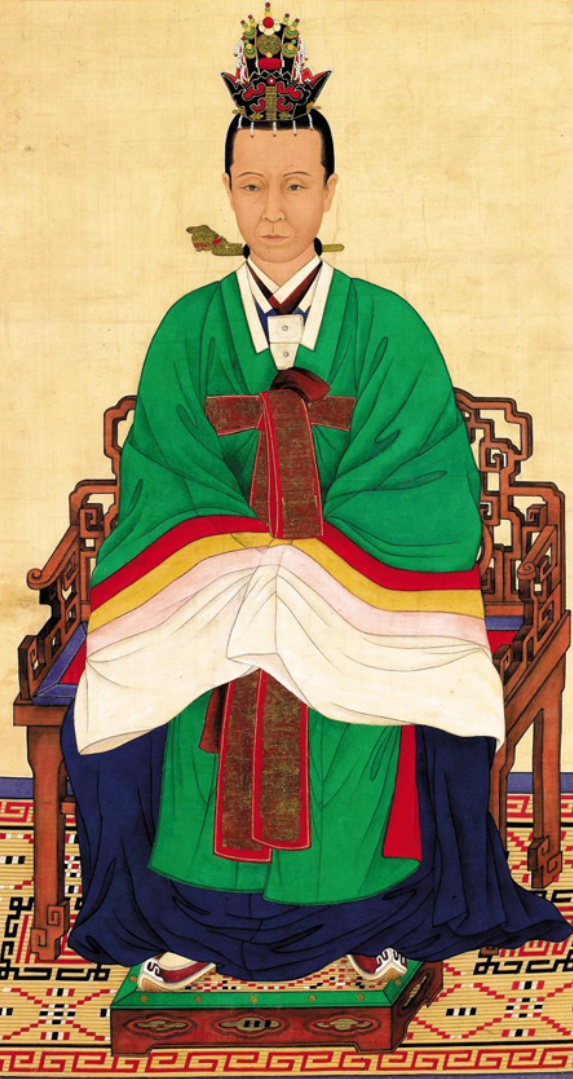
Queen Sinjeong

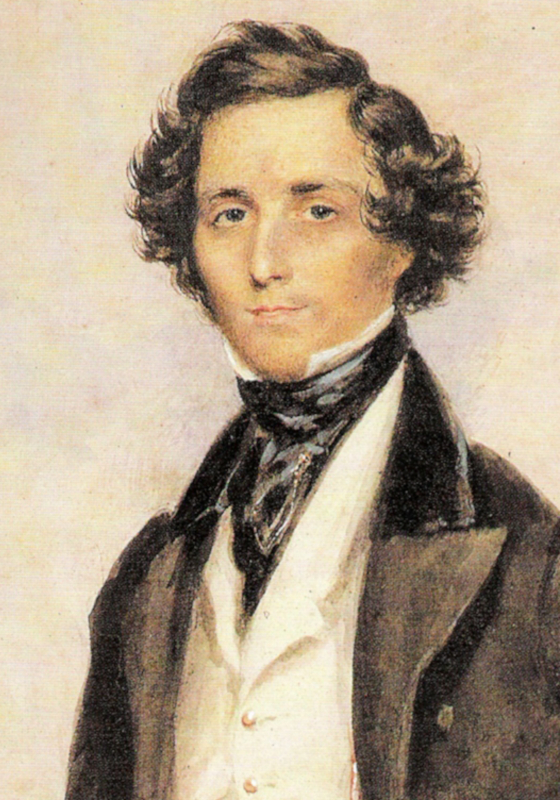
Felix Mendelssohn

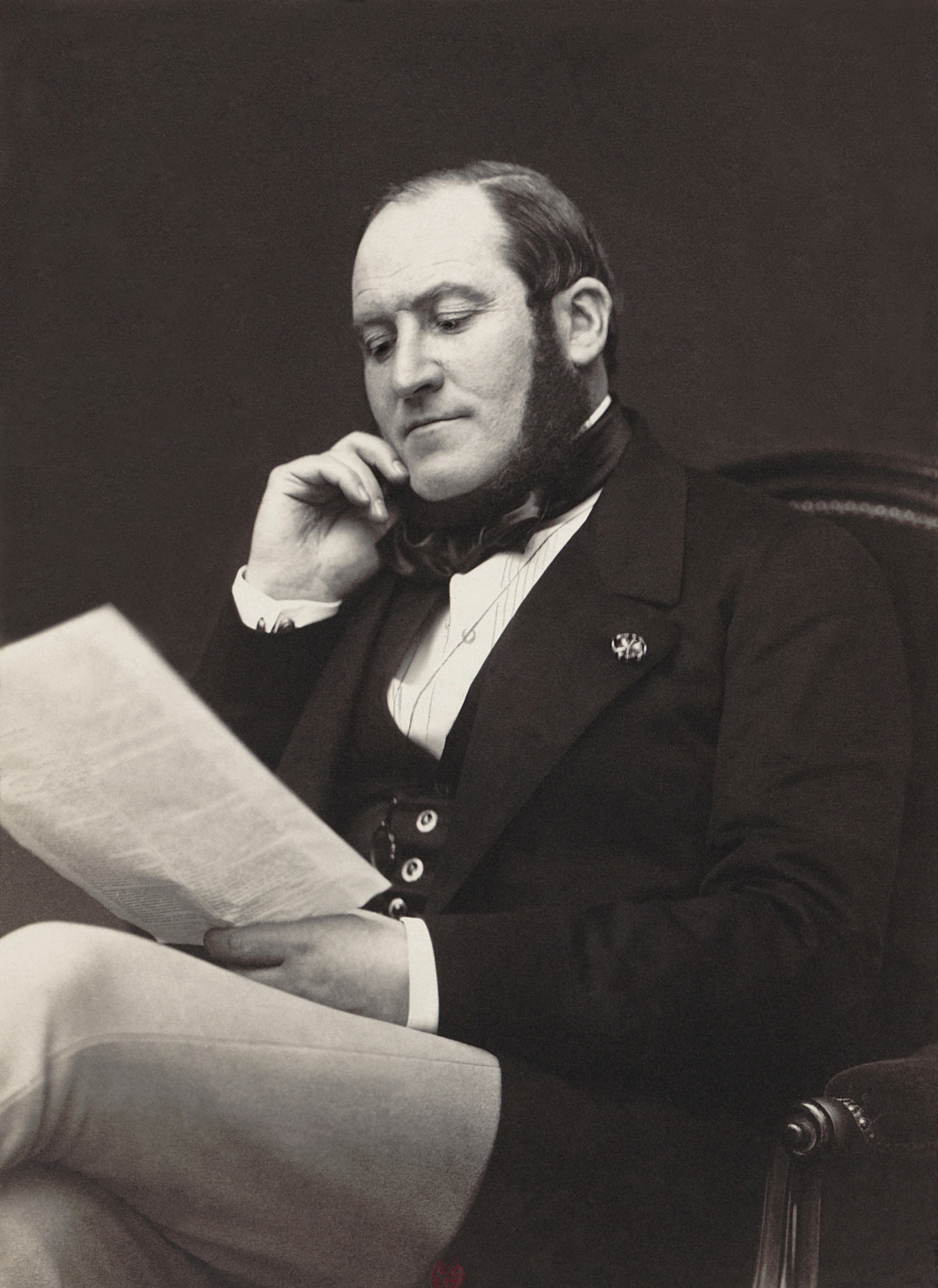
Georges-Eugène Haussmann

- January 1 – Cao Bá Quát, Vietnamese poet (d. 1855)
- January 4 – Louis Braille, French teacher, inventor of braille (d. 1852)
- January 6 – Marie Durocher, Brazilian obstetrician, physician (d. 1893)
- January 15
  - Cornelia Connelly, American founder of the Society of the Holy Child Jesus (d. 1879)
  - Pierre-Joseph Proudhon, French anarchist (d. 1864)
- January 19 – Edgar Allan Poe, American writer, poet (d. 1849)
- January 21 – Queen Sinjeong, Korean regent (d. 1890)
- February 1 – Sophia Crichton-Stuart, Marchioness of Bute, Scottish philanthropist (d. 1859)
- February 3 – Felix Mendelssohn, German composer (d. 1847)
- February 12
  - Charles Darwin, British naturalist (d. 1882)
  - Abraham Lincoln, 16th President of the United States (d. 1865)
- February 15 – Cyrus McCormick, American inventor (d. 1884)
- February 20 – Albertus Jacobus Duymaer van Twist, Governor-General of the Dutch East Indies (d. 1887)
- February 23 – William Sprague, American minister and politician from Michigan (d. 1868)
- February 24 – Edwin Freiherr von Manteuffel, Prussian field marshal (d. 1885)
- March 1 – Robert Cornelius, American pioneer of photography (d 1893)
- March 2 – Abel Douay, French general (d. 1870)
- March 15 – Joseph Jenkins Roberts, 2-time President of Liberia (d. 1876)
- March 23 – Charlotte von Hagn, German actress (d. 1891)
- March 24 – Joseph Liouville, French mathematician (d. 1882)
- March 27 – Georges-Eugène Haussmann, French civic planner (d. 1891)
- March 29 – Bettino Ricasoli, Italian statesman (d. 1880)
- April 1 – Nikolai Gogol, Russian writer (d. 1852)
- April 15 – Hermann Grassmann, Prussian mathematician (d. 1877)
- April 20 – James David Forbes, Scottish physicist, geologist, inventor (d. 1868)
- May 22 – Constantin A. Kretzulescu, 7th Prime Minister of Romania (d. 1884)
- May 23 – Hugo von Kirchbach, Prussian general (d. 1887)
- June 4
  - Columbus Delano, American statesman (d. 1896)
  - John Henry Pratt, English clergyman and mathematician (d. 1871)
- June 8 – Richard Wigginton Thompson, American politician (d. 1900)
- June 11 – Juan Antonio Pezet, Peruvian general and politician, President of Peru (d. 1879)
- June 18 – Stephen Greenleaf Bulfinch, American minister, hymn writer (d 1870)
- June 20 – Isaak August Dorner, German theologian (d. 1884)
- June 21 – Wilhelm Wolff, German political activist (d. 1864)
- June 27 – François Certain de Canrobert, French general, Marshal of France (d. 1895)

=== July–December ===
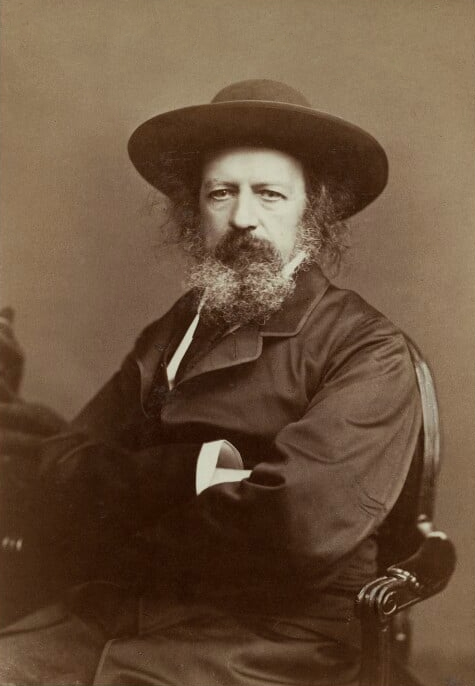
Alfred, Lord Tennyson

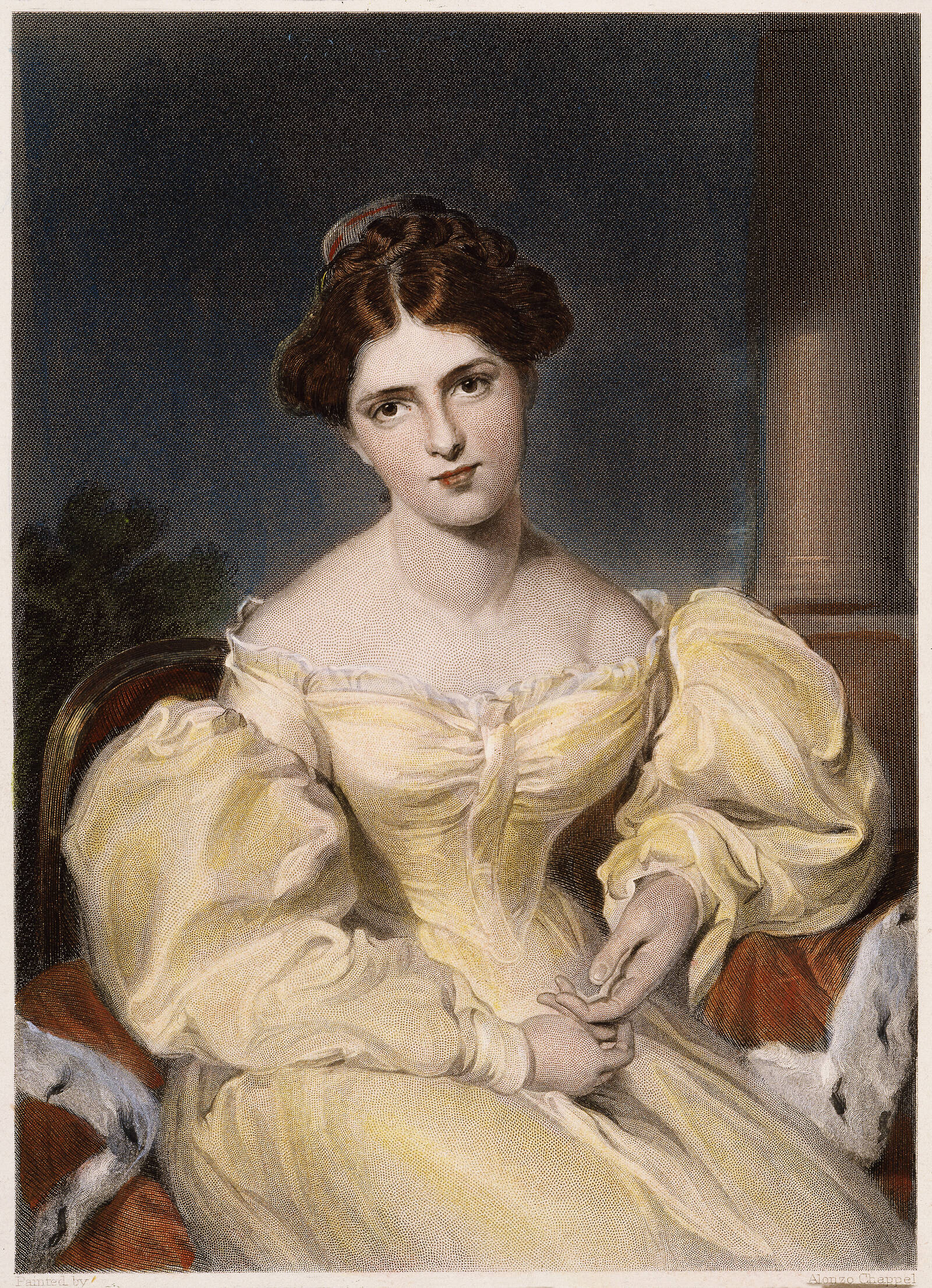
Fanny Kemble

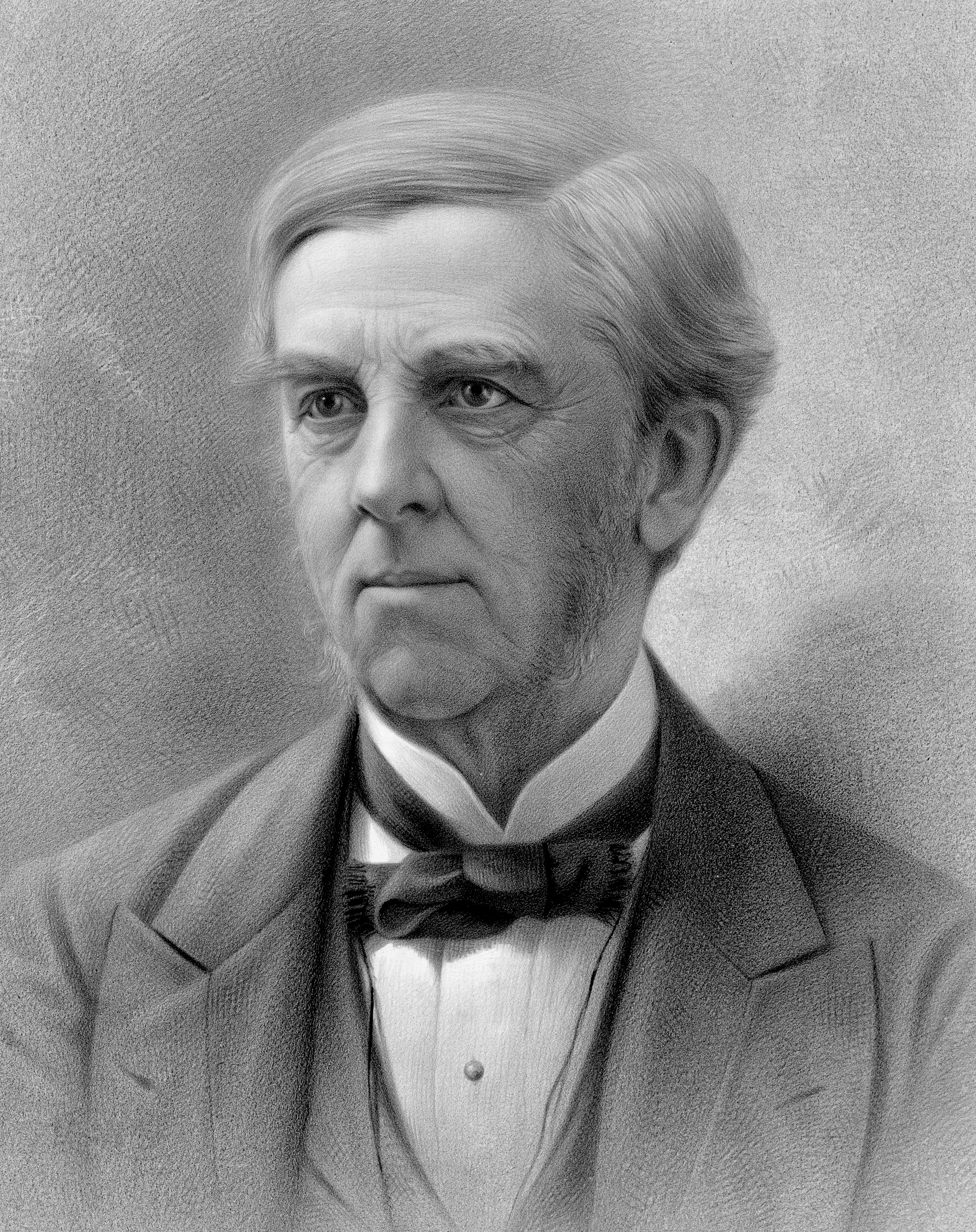
Oliver Wendell Holmes Sr.

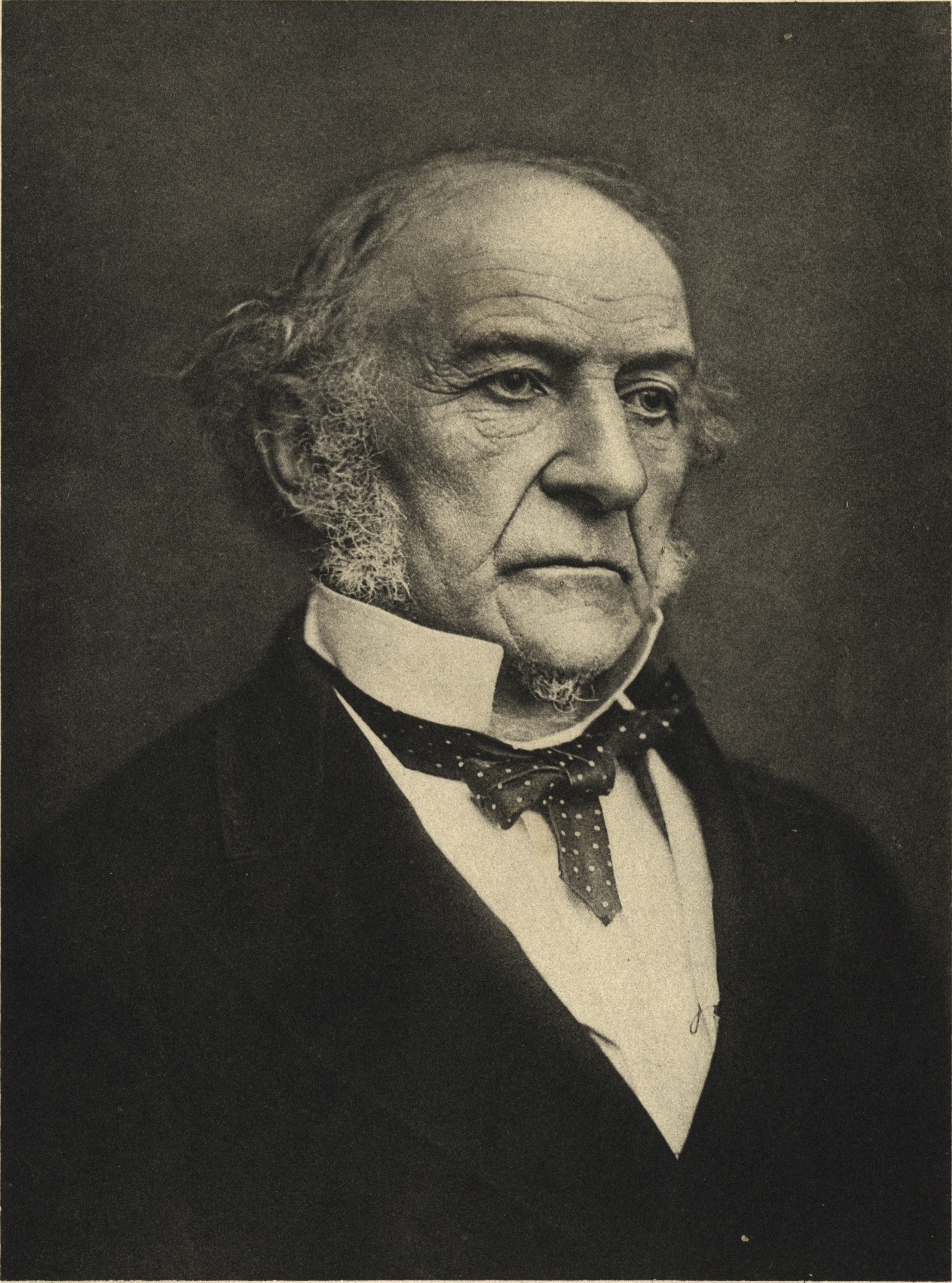
William Gladstone

- July 2 – John R. Goldsborough, United States Navy commodore (d. 1877)
- July 9 – Friedrich Gustav Jakob Henle, German-Jewish anatomist, physician (d. 1885)
- July 16 – Konstantin Bernhard von Voigts-Rhetz, Prussian general (d. 1877)
- July 31 – Francis Walker, English entomologist (d. 1874)
- August 6 – Alfred, Lord Tennyson, British poet (d. 1892)
- August 8 – Heinrich Abeken, German theologian (d. 1872)
- August 29 – Oliver Wendell Holmes Sr., American physician, writer (d. 1894)
- September 4 – Manuel Montt, 5th President of Chile (d. 1880)
- September 12 – Julius von Bose, Prussian general (d. 1894)
- November 4 – Benjamin Robbins Curtis, Associate Justice of the Supreme Court of the United States (d. 1874)
- November 10 – David Einhorn (rabbi), German-American abolitionist (d. 1879)
- November 20 – Gustav Koerner, German-born revolutionary, journalist, lawyer, politician, statesman of Illinois and Germany, Colonel of the U.S. Army (d. 1896)
- November 27 – Fanny Kemble, British-born American actress, writer (d. 1893)
- December 5
  - Edmond Le Bœuf, French general, Marshal of France (d. 1888)
  - Minna Planer, German actress (d. 1866)
- December 24 – Kit Carson, American frontiersman (d. 1868)
- December 29
  - George Washington Baines, American politician, journalist and educator (d. 1882)
  - William Ewart Gladstone, Prime Minister of the United Kingdom (d. 1898)
- December 30 – Wilhelm von Tümpling, Prussian general (d. 1884)

=== Date unknown ===
- Ștefan Golescu, 8th Prime Minister of Romania (d. 1874)

== Deaths ==
1800

=== January–June ===
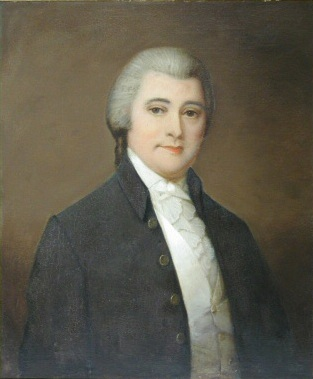
William Blount

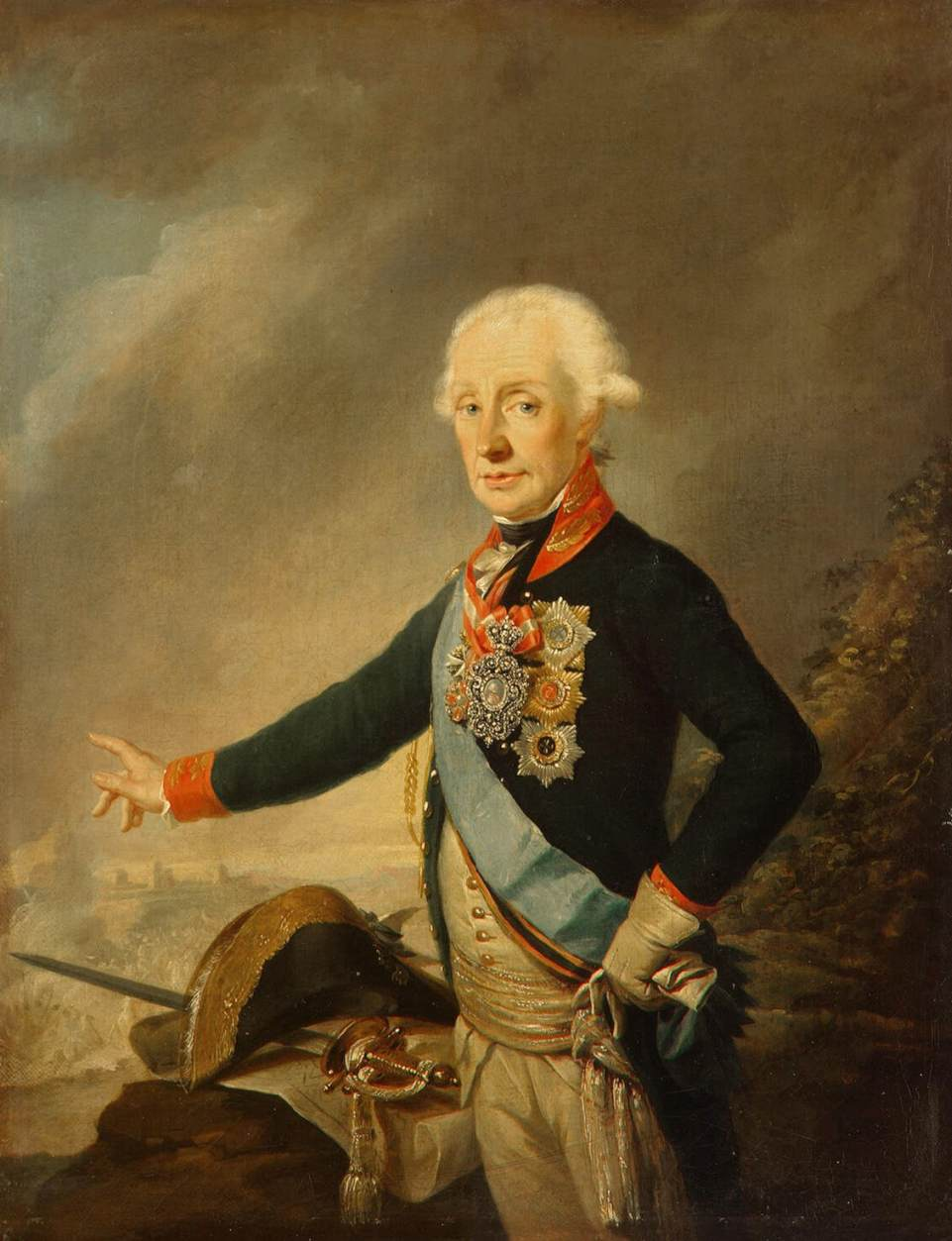
Alexander Suvorov

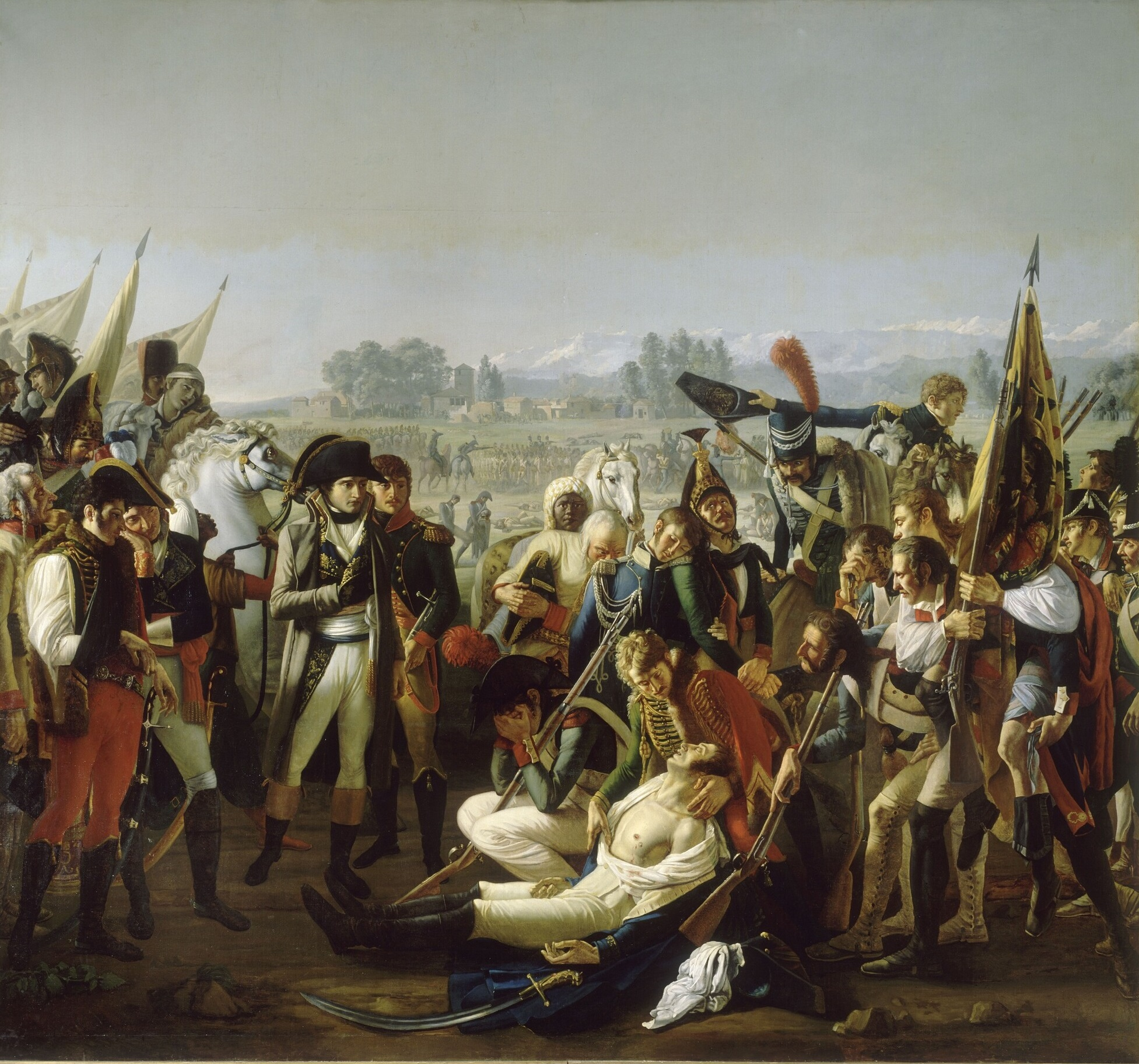
The Death of General Desaix by Jean Broc

- January 1 – Louis-Jean-Marie Daubenton, French naturalist (b. 1716)
- January 3 – Count Karl-Wilhelm Finck von Finckenstein, Prime Minister of Prussia (b. 1714)
- January 6
- William Jones, English divine (b. 1726)
- Friedrich Adolf Riedesel, German soldier (b. 1738)
- January 9 – Jean Étienne Championnet, French general (b.1762)
- January 11 – Kyra Frosini, Greek heroine (b. 1773)
- January 16 – Johann Christian Wiegleb, German chemist (b. 1732)
- January 20 – Thomas Mifflin, first Governor of Pennsylvania (b. 1744)
- January 23 – Edward Rutledge, U.S. statesman (b. 1749)
- February 4 – Charlotte Sophie of Aldenburg, German sovereign (b. 1715)
- February 7 – Anna Jabłonowska, Polish magnate and politician (b. 1728)
- February 27 – Adélaïde of France, French princess (b.1732)
- March 1 – John Hazelwood, English-born officer in the U.S. Continental Navy (b. 1726)
- March 13 – Nana Fadnavis, Maratha statesman (b. 1742)
- March 14 – Daines Barrington, English naturalist (b. 1727)
- March 19 – Joseph de Guignes, French orientalist (b. 1721)
- March 21 – William Blount, U.S. statesman (b. 1749)
- March 29 – Marc René, marquis de Montalembert, French military engineer and writer (b. 1714)
- April 13 – Kazimierz Poniatowski, Polish nobleman (b. 1721)
- April 21 – Johan August Meijerfeldt the Younger, Swedish field marshal (b. 1725)
- April 22 – George Paulet, 12th Marquess of Winchester, British politician (b. 1722)
- April 25
- Israel Acrelius, Swedish missionary and clergyman (b. 1714)
- Ezekiel Cornell, Continental Congressman from Rhode Island (b. 1732)
- William Cowper, English poet (b. 1731)
- May 7 – Niccolò Piccinni, Italian composer (b. 1728)
- May 23 – Henry Cort, English ironmaster (b. 1740)
- May 18 – Alexander Suvorov, Count of Rymnik (b. 1729)
- May 29 – Charlotte Slottsberg, Swedish ballerina (b. 1760)
- June 2 – Ingeborg Akeleye, Norwegian noble known for her love life (b. 1741)
- June 14
- Louis Charles Antoine Desaix, French military leader (killed in battle) (b. 1768)
- Jean-Baptiste Kléber, French general (assassinated) (b. 1753)
- June 18 – Francis V de Beauharnais, French nobleman, soldier, politician, colonial governor and admiral (b. 1714)
- June 20 – Abraham Gotthelf Kästner, German mathematician (b. 1719)
- June 24 – Charles Stewart, American revolutionary (b. 1729)
- June 28
- Heinrich XI, Prince Reuss of Greiz, German noble (b. 1722)
- King Jeongjo of Joseon, 22nd ruler of the Joseon dynasty of Korea (b. 1752)
- Théophile Corret de la Tour d'Auvergne, grenadier officer in the French army (b. 1743)
- June 30 – Thomas Townshend, 1st Viscount Sydney, British politician (b. 1732)

=== July–December ===
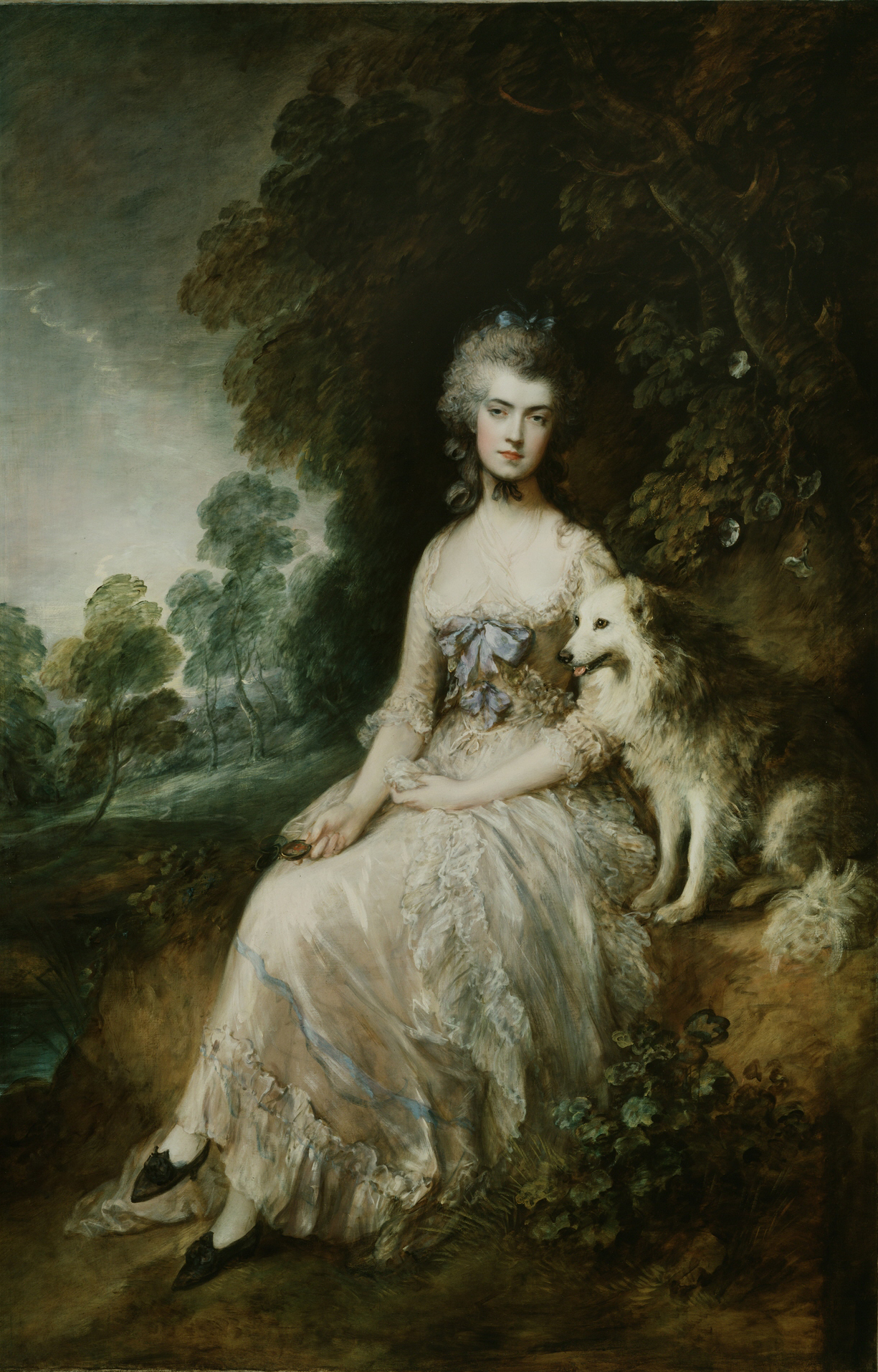
Mary Robinson

- July 14 – Lorenzo Mascheroni, Italian mathematician (b. 1750)
- July 18 – John Rutledge, governor of South Carolina (b. 1739)
- August 12 – Anne-Catherine de Ligniville, Madame Helvétius, French salon holder (b. 1722)
- August 16 – Samuel Barrington, English admiral (b. 1729)
- August 25 – Elizabeth Montagu, English literary critic (b. 1718)
- August 31 – John Blair, American politician (b. 1732)
- September 2 – Maciej Radziwiłł, Polish nobleman (b. 1749)
- September 3 – Elżbieta Branicka, Polish szlachta and politician (b. 1734)
- September 10 – Johann David Schoepff, German naturalist, doctor (b. 1752)
- September 23 – Dominique de La Rochefoucauld, French Catholic cardinal (b. 1712)
- September 26 – William Billings, American choral composer (b. 1746)
- September 27 – William Gibbons, American lawyer, revolutionary (b. 1726)
- October 4 – Johann Hermann, German physician, naturalist (b. 1738)
- October 10 – Gabriel Prosser, American slave revolutionary (b. approx. 1776)
- October 16 – Benjamin Huntington, American lawyer, politician (b. 1736)
- October 28 – Artemas Ward, American Major General in the American Revolutionary War, Congressman from Massachusetts (b. 1727)
- October 29 – Koide Ichijūrō, kabuki composer and performer (b. date unknown)
- November 5 – Jesse Ramsden, English astronomical instrument maker (b. 1735)
- November 14 – François Claude Amour, marquis de Bouillé, French general (b. 1739)
- November 25 – Francisco Bouligny, former military governor of Spanish Louisiana (b. 1736)
- November 30 – Matthew Robinson, 2nd Baron Rokeby, English eccentric nobleman (b. 1712)
- December – Jean-Baptiste Audebert, French artist, naturalist (b. 1759)
- December 7 – Wilhelm von Knyphausen, Hessian Lieutenant-General (b. 1716)
- December 27 – Hugh Blair, Scottish Presbyterian preacher, man of letters (b. 1718)
- December 30 – Thomas Dimsdale, English physician, banker (b. 1712)

=== Date unknown ===
- Marie-Louise-Adélaïde Boizot, French engraver (b. 1744)

1801

=== January–June ===
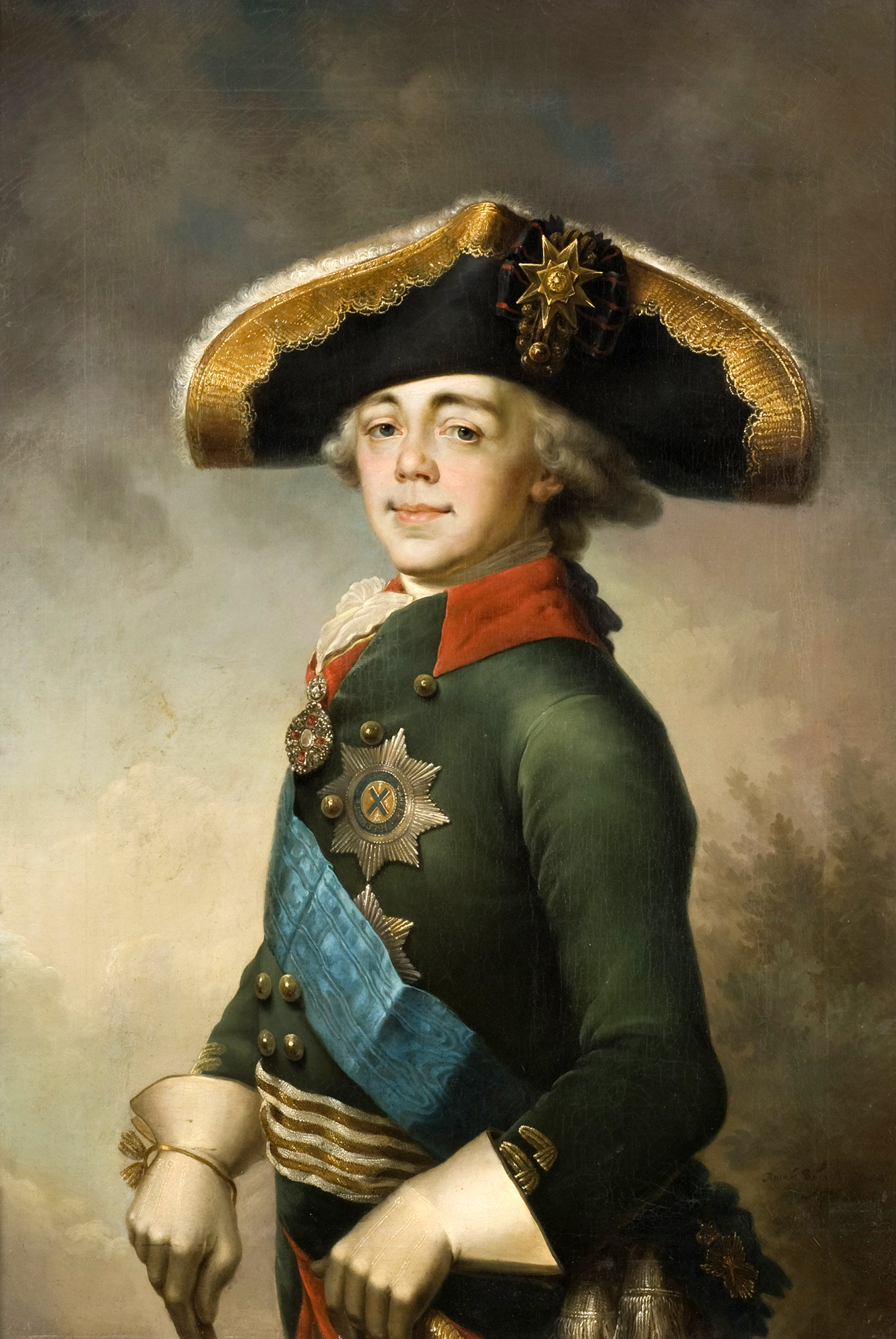
Paul I of Russia

- January 2 – Johann Kaspar Lavater, Swiss physiognomist (b. 1741)
- January 11 – Domenico Cimarosa, Italian composer (b. 1749)
- February 7 – Daniel Chodowiecki, Polish painter (b. 1726)
- February 17 – Princess Philippine Charlotte of Prussia (b. 1716)
- March 14 – Margarita "Peggy" Schuyler Van Rensselaer, American socialite, Angelica Schuyler Church's sister (b. 1758)
- March 16 – Grand Duchess Alexandra Pavlovna of Russia, daughter of Paul I of Russia (b.1783)
- March 19 – Ambrosio O'Higgins, 1st Marquis of Osorno, Spanish viceroy of Peru and Governor of the Captaincy General of Chile, father of Bernardo O'Higgins, (b. c. 1720)
- March 21 – Andrea Luchesi, Italian composer (b. 1741)
- March 23 – Tsar Paul I of Russia (b. 1754)
- March 25 – Novalis, German poet (b. 1772)
- March 28 – Ralph Abercromby, British general (b. 1734)
- April 2 – Thomas Dadford, Jr., British engineer (b. ca. 1761)
- April 7 – Noël François de Wailly, French lexicographer (b. 1724)
- May 3 – Cyrus Trapaud, British Army general (b. 1715)
- May 17 – William Heberden, English physician (b. 1710)
- June 4 – Frederick Muhlenberg, first Speaker of the U.S. House of Representatives (b. 1750)
- June 14 – Benedict Arnold, American Revolution hero, then traitor (b. 1741)

=== July–December ===
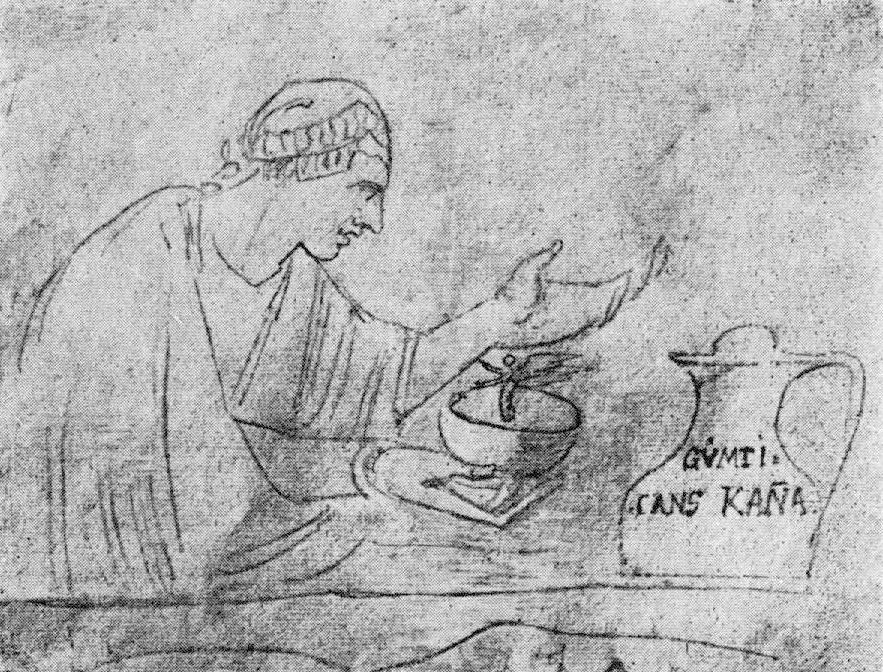
Ulrica Arfvidsson

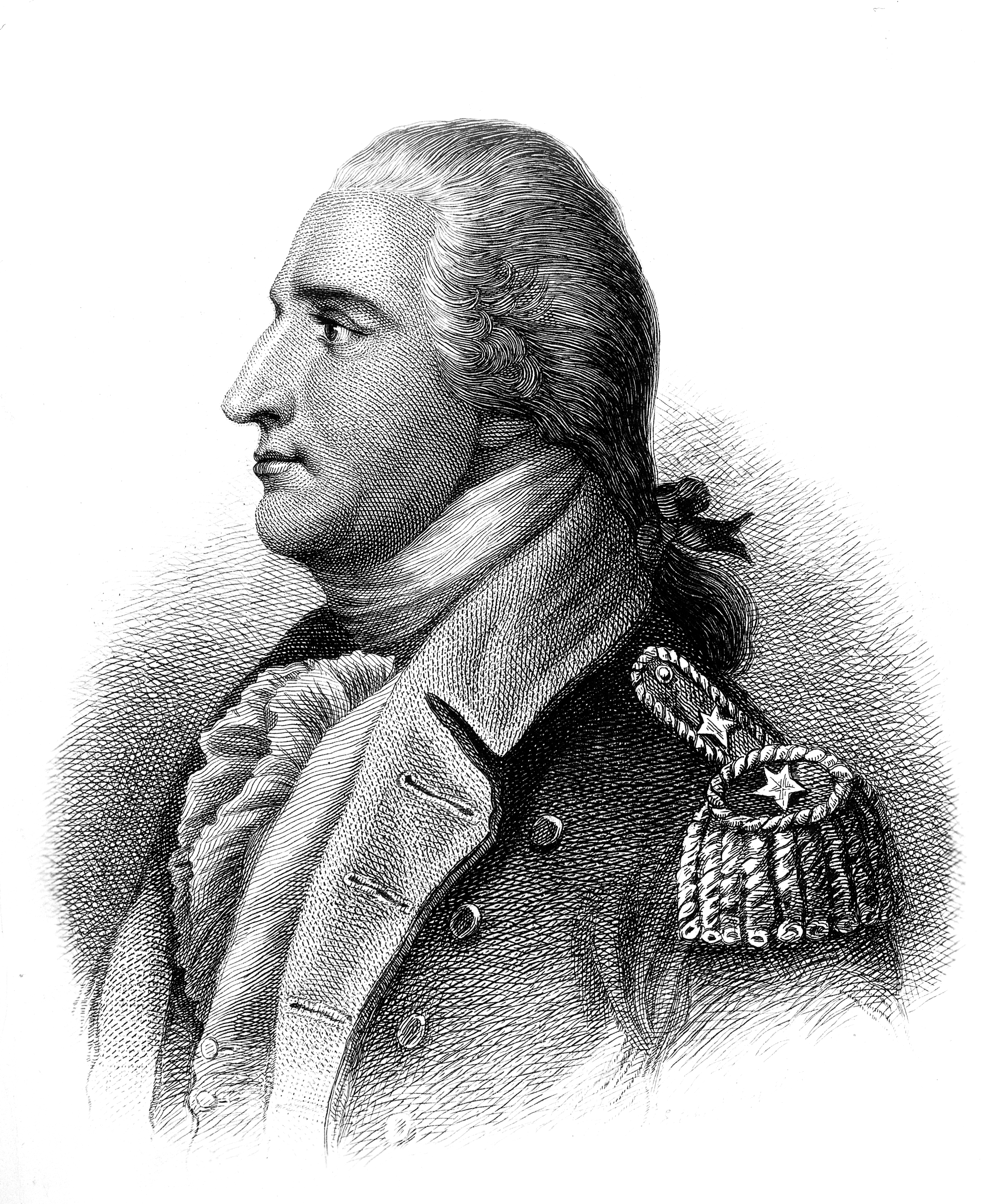
Benedict Arnold

- July 4 – Leendert Viervant the Younger, Dutch architect (b. 1752)
- August 13 – George Gordon, 3rd Earl of Aberdeen (b. 1722)
- August 31 – Nicola Sala, Italian opera composer (b. 1713)
- September 19 – Johann Gottfried Koehler, German astronomer (b. 1745)
- October 3 – Philippe Henri, marquis de Ségur, Marshal of France (b. 1724)
- November 4 – William Shippen, American physician, Continental Congressman (b. 1712)
- November 5
  - Humphry Marshall, American botanist (b. 1722)
  - Motoori Norinaga, Japanese philologist and scholar (b. 1730)
- November 24
  - Franz Moritz von Lacy, Austrian field marshal (b. 1725)
  - Philip Hamilton, son of American soldier and statesman, Alexander Hamilton (b. 1782)

=== Date unknown ===
- Ulrica Arfvidsson, Swedish fortune teller (b. 1734)
- Frances Williams, Welsh convict (b. c. 1760)

1802

=== January–June ===
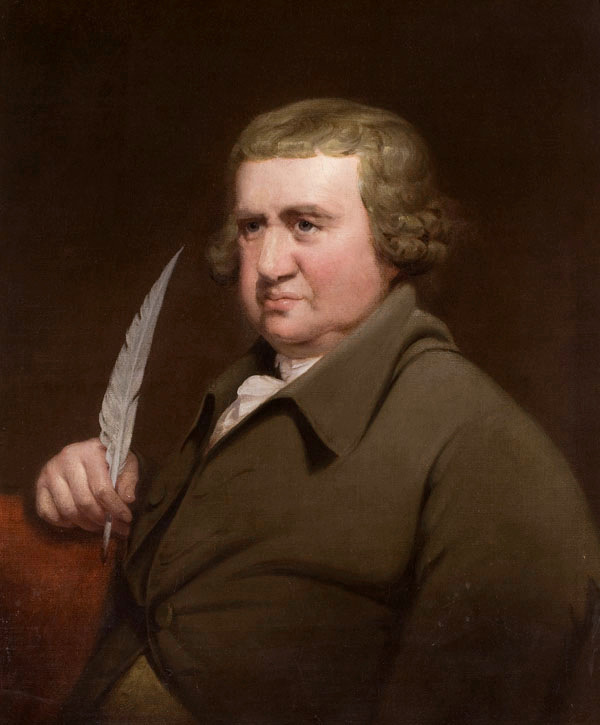
Erasmus Darwin

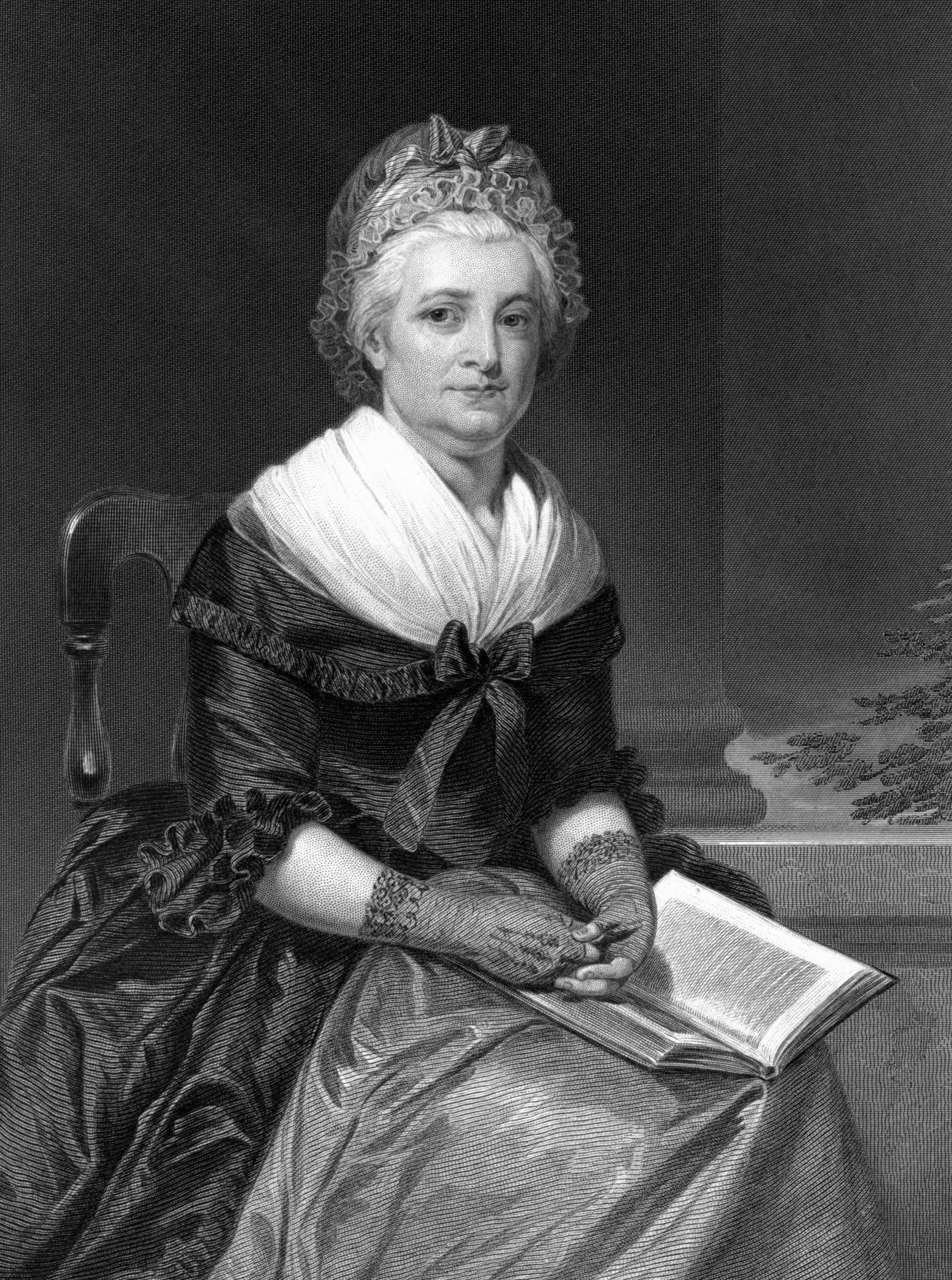
Martha Washington

- February 2 – Welbore Ellis, 1st Baron Mendip, British statesman (b. 1713)
- February 3 – Pedro Rodríguez, Count of Campomanes, Spanish statesman, writer (b. 1723)
- February 10 – Samuel Phillips, Jr., Massachusetts lieutenant governor (b. 1752)
- February 26 – Esek Hopkins, American Revolutionary War admiral (b. 1718)
- April 13 – Charles Moss, British bishop (b. 1711)
- April 18 – Erasmus Darwin, English physician and botanist (b. 1731)
- April 26 – Edmund Nelson (clergyman), English priest (b. 1722)
- May 9 – Erik Magnus Staël von Holstein, Swedish ambassador (b. 1749)
- May 22 – Martha Washington, first First Lady of the United States (b. 1731)

=== July–December ===
- July 6 – Daniel Morgan, American pioneer, Congressman from Virginia, and general (b. 1736)
- July 15 – John de Verdion, London-based bookseller and language instructor (b. 1740s)
- July 22 – Xavier Bichat, French anatomist and pathologist (b. 1771)
- July 24 – Joseph Ducreux, French noble, portrait painter, pastelist, miniaturist, and engraver (b. 1735)
- July 25 – Friedrich Karl Joseph von Erthal, Archbishop of Mainz (b. 1719)
- August 10 – Franz Aepinus, German philosopher (b. 1724)
- August 12 – Louis Lebègue Duportail French military leader in the Continental Army during the American Revolutionary War (b. 1743)
- September 19 – Princess Luisa of Naples and Sicily (b. 1773)
- September 26 – Jurij Vega, Slovenian mathematician, physicist, and soldier (b. 1754)
- October 5 – Suzanne Bélair, Haitian national heroine (b. 1781)
- October 8 – Emmanuele Vitale, Maltese military leader (b.1758)
- October 31 – Sir William Parker, 1st Baronet, of Harburn, British admiral (b. 1743)
- November 9 – Thomas Girtin, English artist (b. 1775)
- November 15 – George Romney, English artist (b. 1734)
- November 16 – André Michaux, French botanist (b. 1746)
- December 5 – Lemuel Francis Abbott, English portrait painter (b. 1716)
- December 31 – Francis Lewis, signer of the United States Declaration of Independence (b. 1713)

1803

=== January–June ===
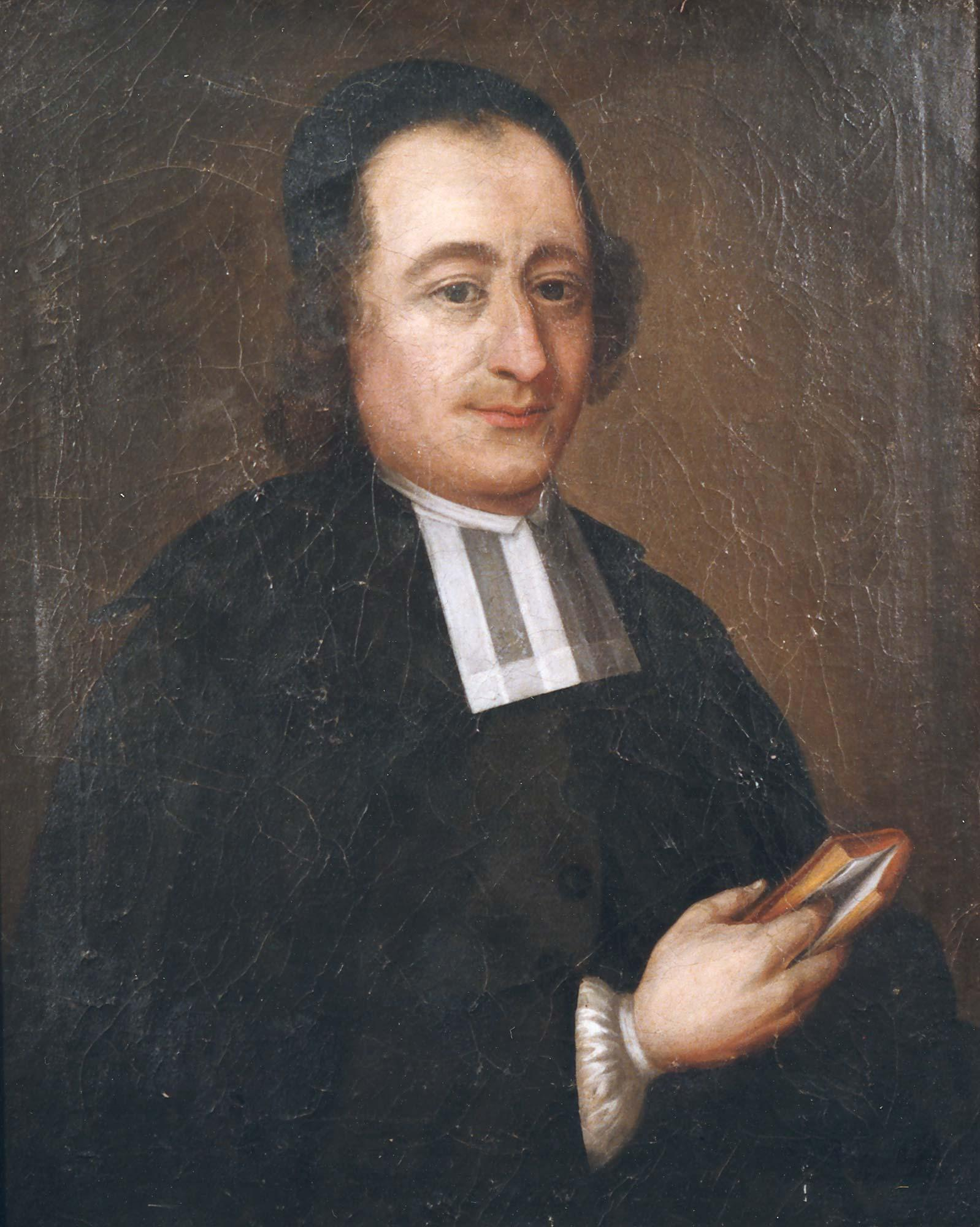
Anders Chydenius

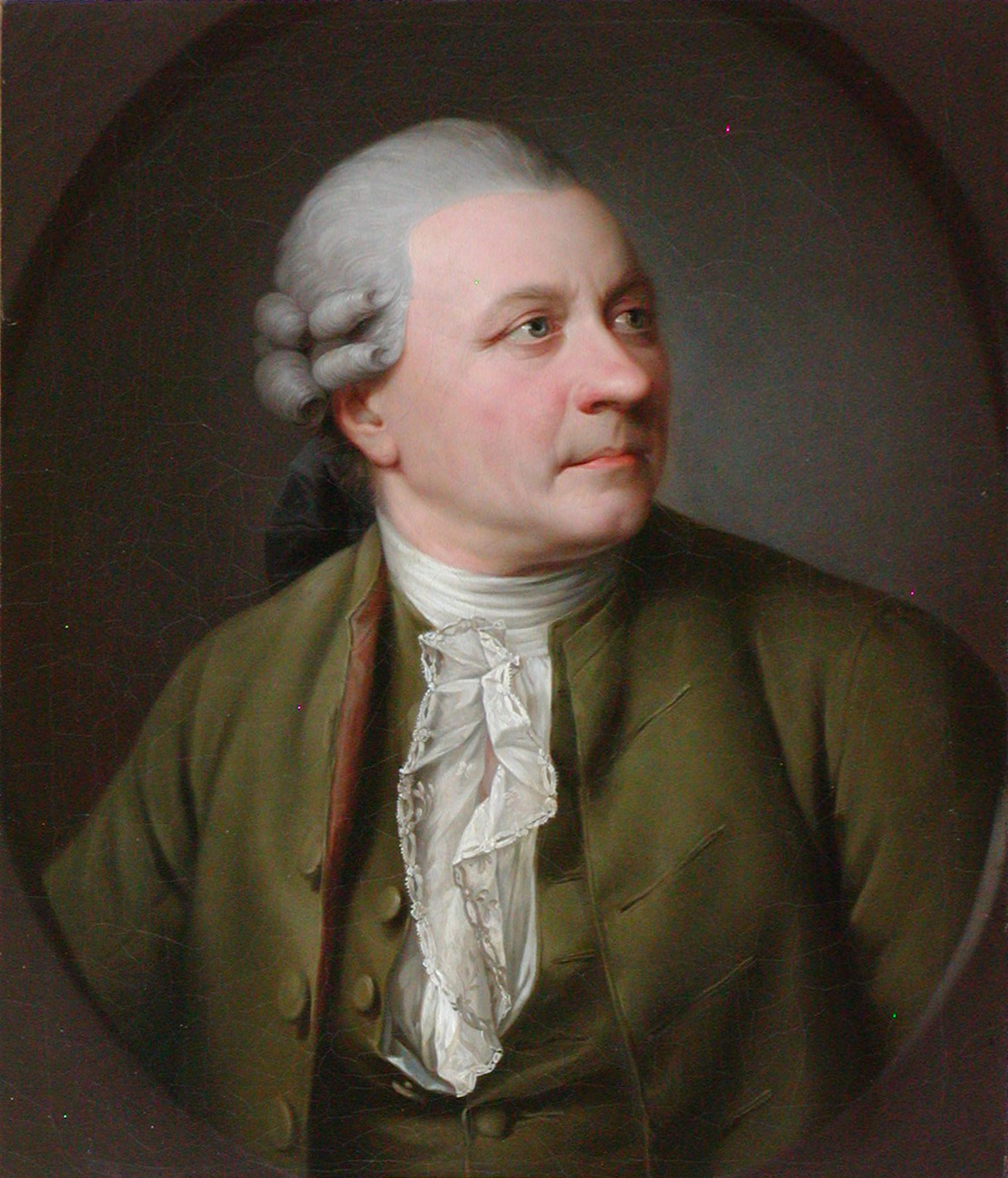
Friedrich Gottlieb Klopstock

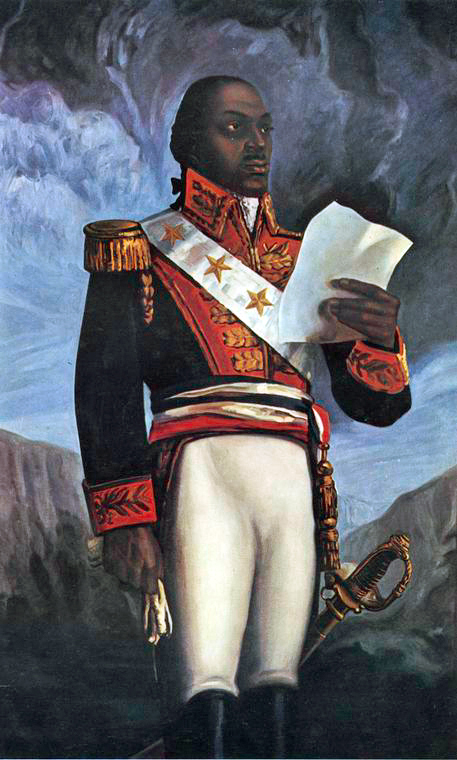
Toussaint Louverture

- January 1 – James Woodforde, English clergyman, diarist (b. 1740)
- January 18 – Ippolit Bogdanovich, Russian poet (b. 1743)
- January 23 – Arthur Guinness, Irish brewer (b. 1725)
- February 1 – Anders Chydenius, Finnish priest, politician (b. 1729)
- February 3 – María Isidra de Guzmán y de la Cerda, Spanish scholar (b. 1768)
- February 9 – Jean François de Saint-Lambert, French poet (b. 1716)
- February 11 – Jean-François de La Harpe, French critic (b. 1739)
- February 18 – Johann Wilhelm Ludwig Gleim, German poet (b. 1719)
- February 20 – Marie Dumesnil, French actress (b. 1713)
- February 22 – Jacques-Donatien Le Ray de Chaumont, French Father of the American Revolution (b. 1726)
- February 23 – Praskovia Kovalyova-Zhemchugova, Russian serf actress, opera soprano (b. 1768)
- February 21 – Edward Despard, British revolutionary (b. 1751)
- March 14 – Friedrich Gottlieb Klopstock, German poet (b. 1724)
- March 28 – Peter Du Cane, Sr., British businessman (b. 1713)
- April 2 – Sir James Montgomery, 1st Baronet, Scottish politician, judge (b. 1721)
- April 6 – William Hamilton, British diplomat, antiquary (b. 1730)
- April 7
  - Antoine de Bosc de la Calmette, Danish statesman, landscape architect (b. 1752)
  - Toussaint L'Ouverture, Haitian revolutionary (b. 1743)
- April 14 – Christoph Anton Migazzi, Austrian Catholic bishop (b. 1714)
- April 24 – Adélaïde Labille-Guiard, French portrait painter (b. 1749)
- May 8 – John Joseph Merlin, Belgian-born British clock- and musical-instrument-maker and inventor (b. 1735)
- May 29 – Louis-Antoine Caraccioli, French writer (b. 1719)
- June 24 – Matthew Thornton, American signer of the Declaration of Independence (b. 1714)
- June 26 – Fermín Lasuén, Spanish missionary (b. 1736)

=== July–December ===
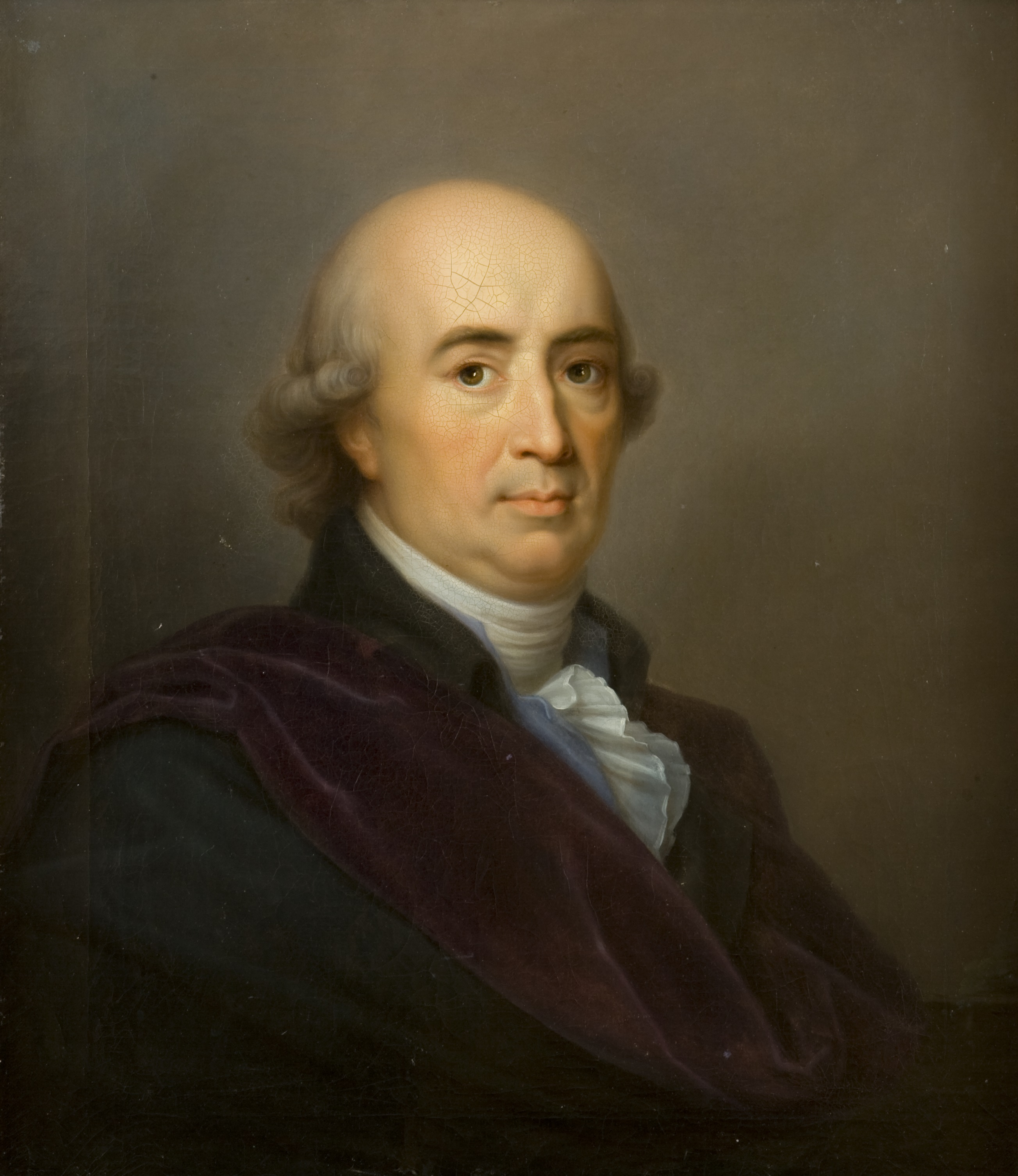
Johann Gottfried Herder

- August 24 – James Napper Tandy, Irish republican
- September 5 – Pierre Choderlos de Laclos, French general, author (b. 1741)
- September 13 – John Barry, officer in the Continental Navy during the American Revolutionary War, later in the United States Navy (b. 1745)
- September 15
  - Gian Francesco Albani, Italian Catholic cardinal (b. 1719)
  - François Devienne, French composer (b. 1759)
- September 16 – Nicolas Baudin, French explorer (b. 1754)
- September 17 – Franz Xaver Süssmayr, Austrian composer (b. 1766)
- September 23 – Joseph Ritson, English antiquary (b. 1752)
- September 27 – Frances Brett Hodgkinson, English-born American actress (b. 1771)
- October 2 – Samuel Adams, American revolutionary leader (b. 1722)
- October 8 – Vittorio Alfieri, Italian dramatist, poet (b. 1749)
- October 14 – Louis Claude de Saint-Martin, French philosopher (b. 1743)
- October 26 – Granville Leveson-Gower, 1st Marquess of Stafford, English politician (b. 1721)
- October 31 – Pandara Vanniyan, last King of Vanni (defeated by Lt. von Driberg)
- November 11 – Raphael Cohen, German rabbi (b. 1722)
- November 17 – John Willett Payne, British Royal Navy admiral (b. 1752)
- November 18 – Ditlevine Feddersen, Norwegian culture figure (b. 1727)
- November 25 – Joseph Wilton, English sculptor (b. 1722)
- December 7 – Gerrit Paape, Dutch politician, writer (b. 1752)
- December 15 – Dru Drury, English entomologist (b. 1725)
- December 18 – Johann Gottfried Herder, German philosopher, writer (b. 1744)
- December 26 – Gian Carlo Passeroni, Italian writer (b. 1713)
- December 30 – Francis Lewis, American signer of the Declaration of Independence (b. 1713)

=== Date unknown ===
- Moscho Tzavela, Greek-Souliote heroine (b. 1760)

1804

=== January–June ===
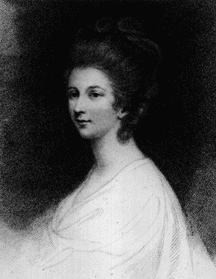
Charlotte Lennox

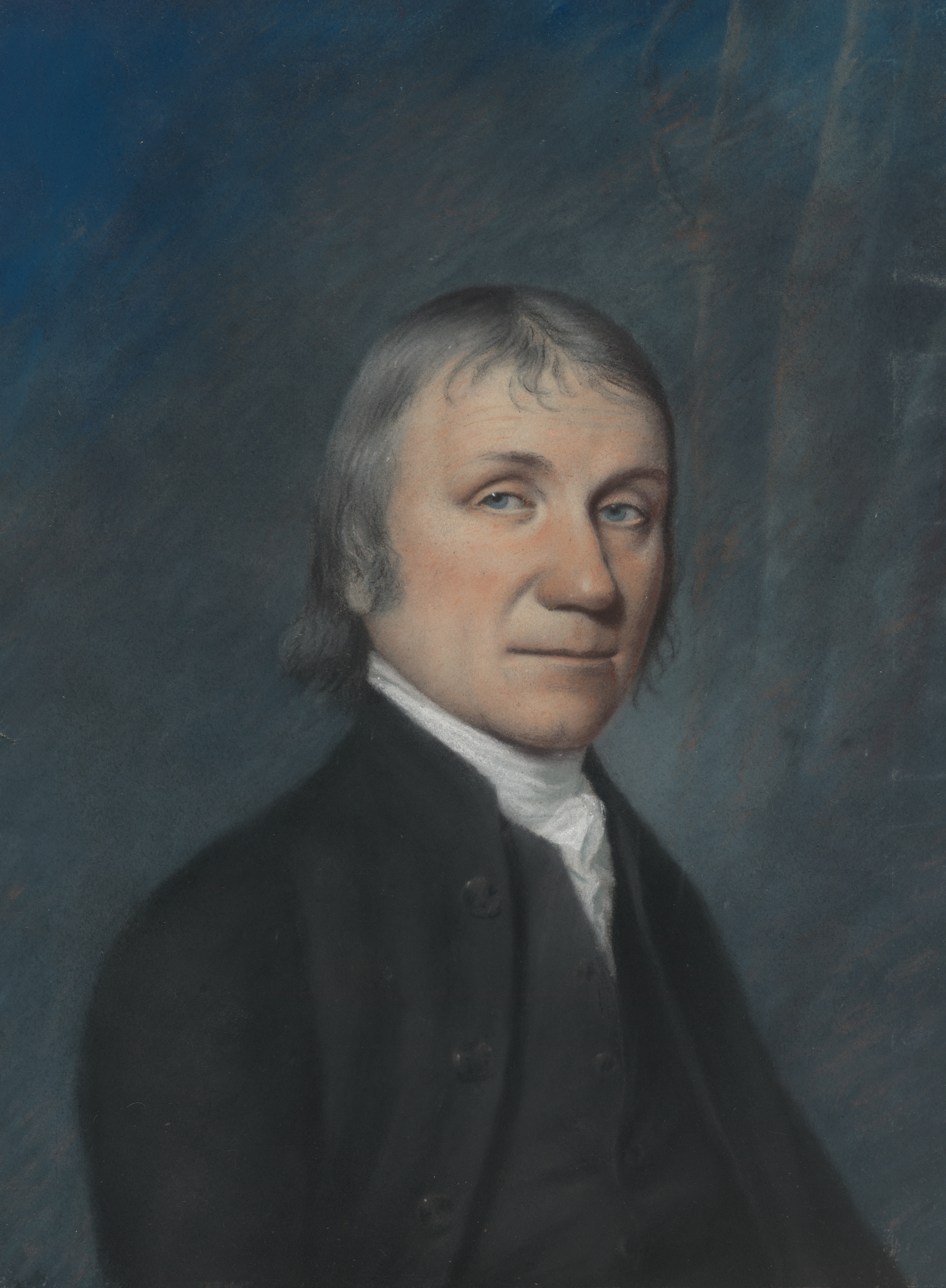
Joseph Priestley

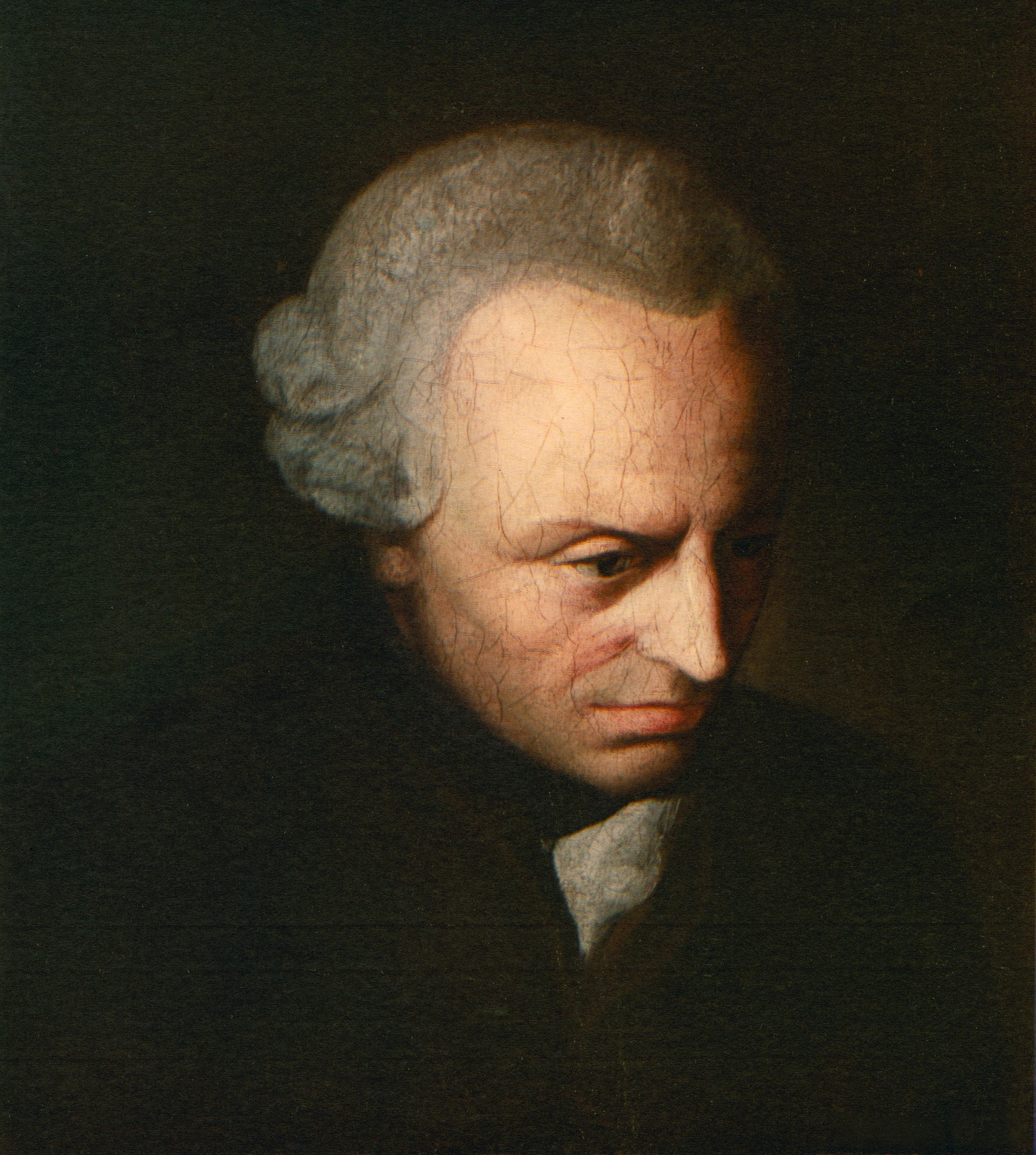
Immanuel Kant

- January 4 – Charlotte Ramsey Lennox, British author and poet (b. 1727)
- January 15 – Dru Drury, English entomologist (b. 1725)
- February 3 – Sir Edward Blackett, 4th Baronet, English politician (b. 1719)
- February 6 – Joseph Priestley, British chemist (b. 1733)
- February 7 – William Bingham, American Continental congressman, senator for Pennsylvania (b. 1752)
- February 12 – Immanuel Kant, German philosopher (b. 1724)
- March 3 – Giovanni Domenico Tiepolo, painter (b. 1727)
- March 13 – Damodar Pande, Prime Minister of Nepal (b. 1752)
- March 16 – Henrik Gabriel Porthan Finnish writer and historian (b. 1739)
- March 21 – Louis Antoine, Duke of Enghien (executed) (b. 1772)
- March 30 – Victor-François, 2nd duc de Broglie, Marshal of France (b. 1718)
- April 9 – Jacques Necker, French statesman (b. 1732)
- April 11 – Miklós Küzmics, Hungarian Slovenes writer, Catholic priest (b. 1737)
- April 15 – Jean-Charles Pichegru, French general (strangled in prison) (b. 1761)
- May 25 – Johann Joachim Spalding, German theologian (b. 1714)

=== July–December ===
- July 12 – Alexander Hamilton, American statesman and Founding Father (killed in a duel) (b. 1755 or 1757)
- September 4 – Richard Somers, American naval officer (killed in battle) (b. 1778)
- September 20 – Pierre Méchain, French astronomer (b. 1744)
- October 2 – Nicolas-Joseph Cugnot, French steam vehicle pioneer (b. 1725)
- October 8 – Thomas Cochran (judge), Canadian judge (b. 1777)
- October 29 – Sarah Crosby, the first female Methodist preacher (b. 1729)
- November 1 – Johann Friedrich Gmelin, German naturalist (b. 1748)
- November 5 – Maria Anna Adamberger, Austrian actress (b. 1752)
- November 18 – Philip Schuyler, general in the American Revolution, a United States senator from New York, father of Angelica Schuyler Church and Elizabeth Schuyler Hamilton, father-in-law of Alexander Hamilton (b. 1733)
- November 23 – Richard Graves, English writer (b. 1715)
- December 18 – Jacob ben Wolf Kranz, Lithuanian maggid (b. c. 1740)
- December 25 – Contarina Barbarigo, famous Venetian noble.

1805

=== January–June ===
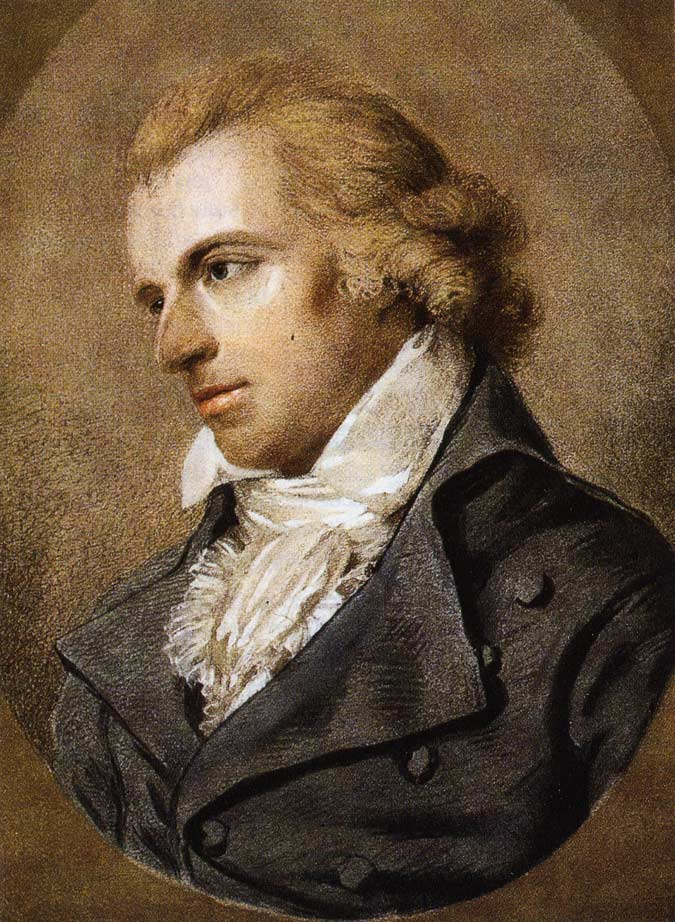
Friedrich Schiller

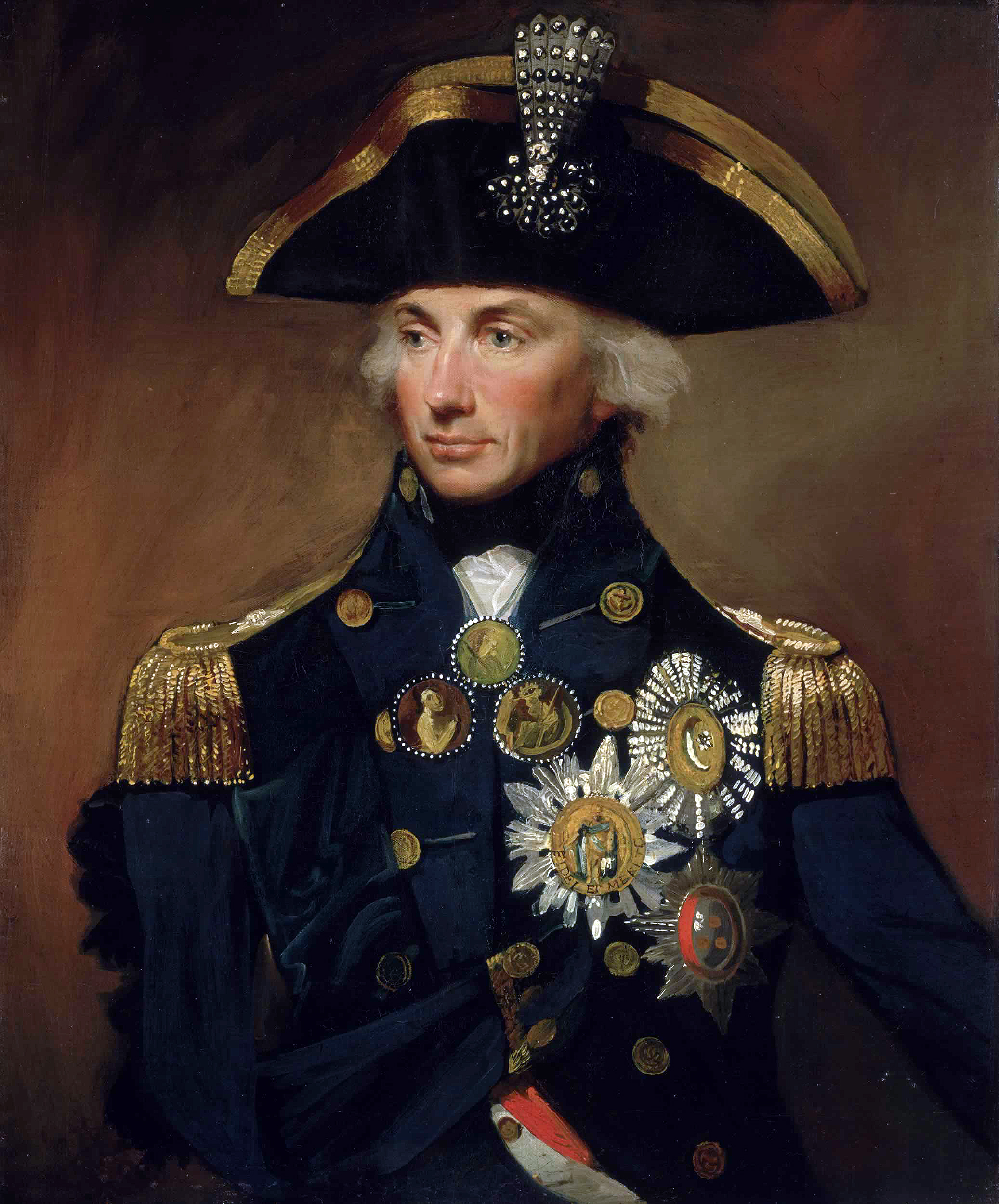
Lord Nelson

- January 7 – Ebenezer Sproat, American Continental Army officer, pioneer to the Ohio Country (b. 1752)
- January 9 – Noble Wimberly Jones, American Continental Congressman (b. 1723)
- January 17 – Paschen von Cossel, German lawyer (b. 1714)
- January 18 – John Moore (archbishop of Canterbury) (b. 1730)
- January 23 – Claude Chappe, French telecommunication pioneer (b. 1763)
- January 24 – Liu Yong, Chinese politician (b. 1719)
- February 2 – Thomas Banks, English sculptor and artist (b. 1735)
- February 11 – Queen Jeongsun, Korean regent (b. 1745)
- February 20 – Justus Claproth, German jurist, inventor of the de-inking process of recycled paper (b. 1728)
- February 25 – Thomas Pownall, English colonial statesman (b. 1722)
- March 4 – Jean-Baptiste Greuze, French painter (b. 1725)
- March 14 – Ji Yun, Chinese politician (b. 1724)
- May 7 – William Petty, 2nd Earl of Shelburne, Prime Minister of Great Britain (b. 1737)
- May 9 – Friedrich Schiller, German playwright (b. 1759)
- May 12 – Ferdinand von Hompesch zu Bolheim, 71st Grandmaster of the Order of Malta (b. 1744)
- May 25
  - William Paley, English philosopher (b. 1743)
  - Anna Maria Rückerschöld, Swedish author (b. 1725)
- May 28 – Luigi Boccherini, Tuscan-born composer (b. 1743)
- June 3 – Princess Louise of Saxe-Meiningen, Landgravine of Hesse-Philippsthal-Barchfeld (b. 1752)
- June 18 – Arthur Murphy, Irish writer (b. 1727)
- June 19 – Louis-Jean-François Lagrenée, French painter (b. 1724)

=== July–December ===
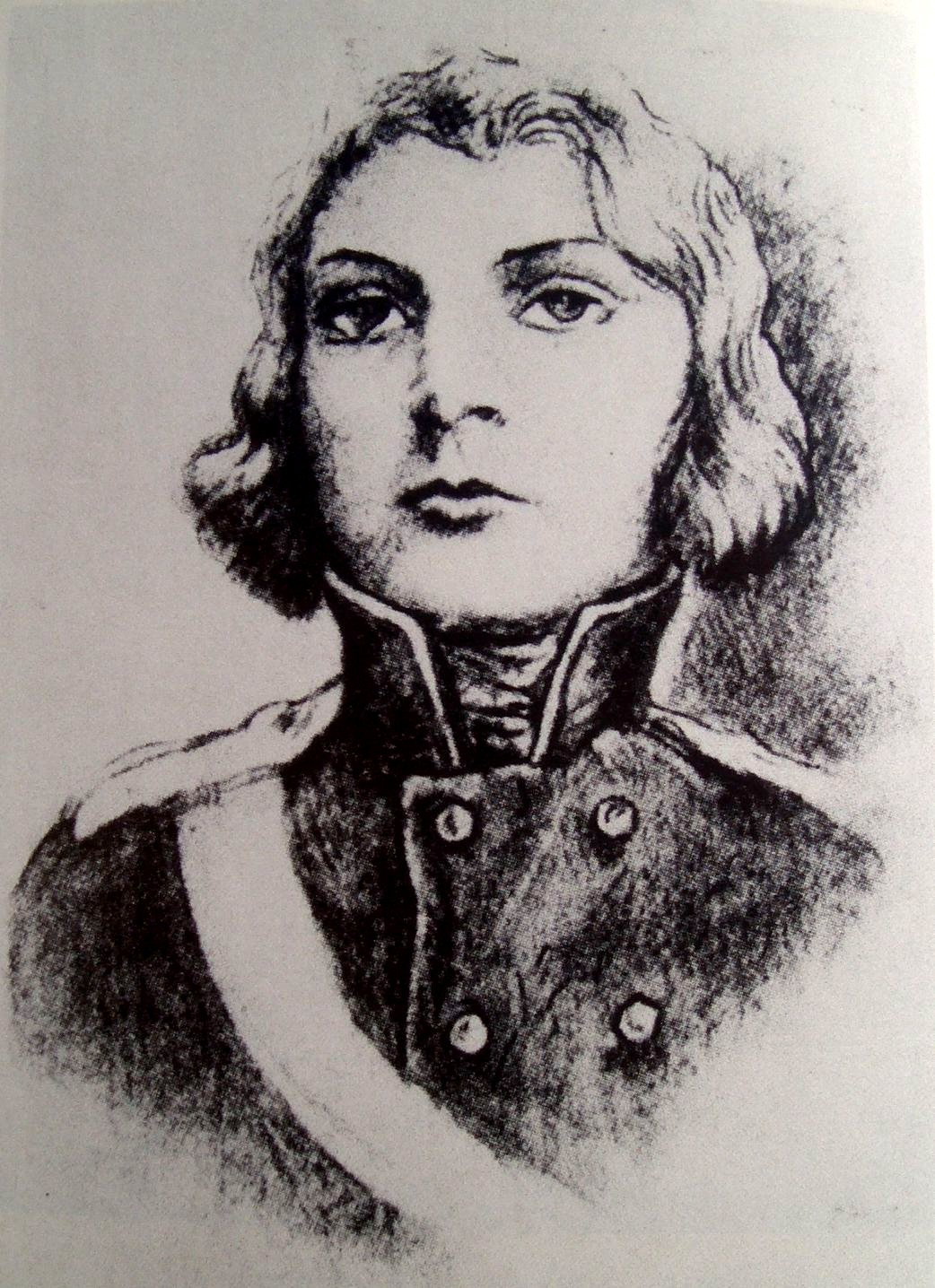
Eleonore Prochaska

- July 31 – Dheeran Chinnamalai, Tamil king (b. 1756)
- August 3 – Christopher Anstey, English writer (b. 1724)
- August 28
  - Alexander Carlyle, Scottish church leader (b. 1722)
  - Christopher Gadsden, American statesman (b. 1724)
- September 27 – William Moultrie, American general (b. 1730)
- September 28 – Christoph Franz von Buseck, Prince-Bishop of Bamberg (b. 1724)
- October 5
  - Charles Cornwallis, 1st Marquess Cornwallis, British general (b. 1738)
  - Eleonore Prochaska, German heroine soldier (b. 1785)
- October 21
  - John Cooke, English captain (b. 1762)
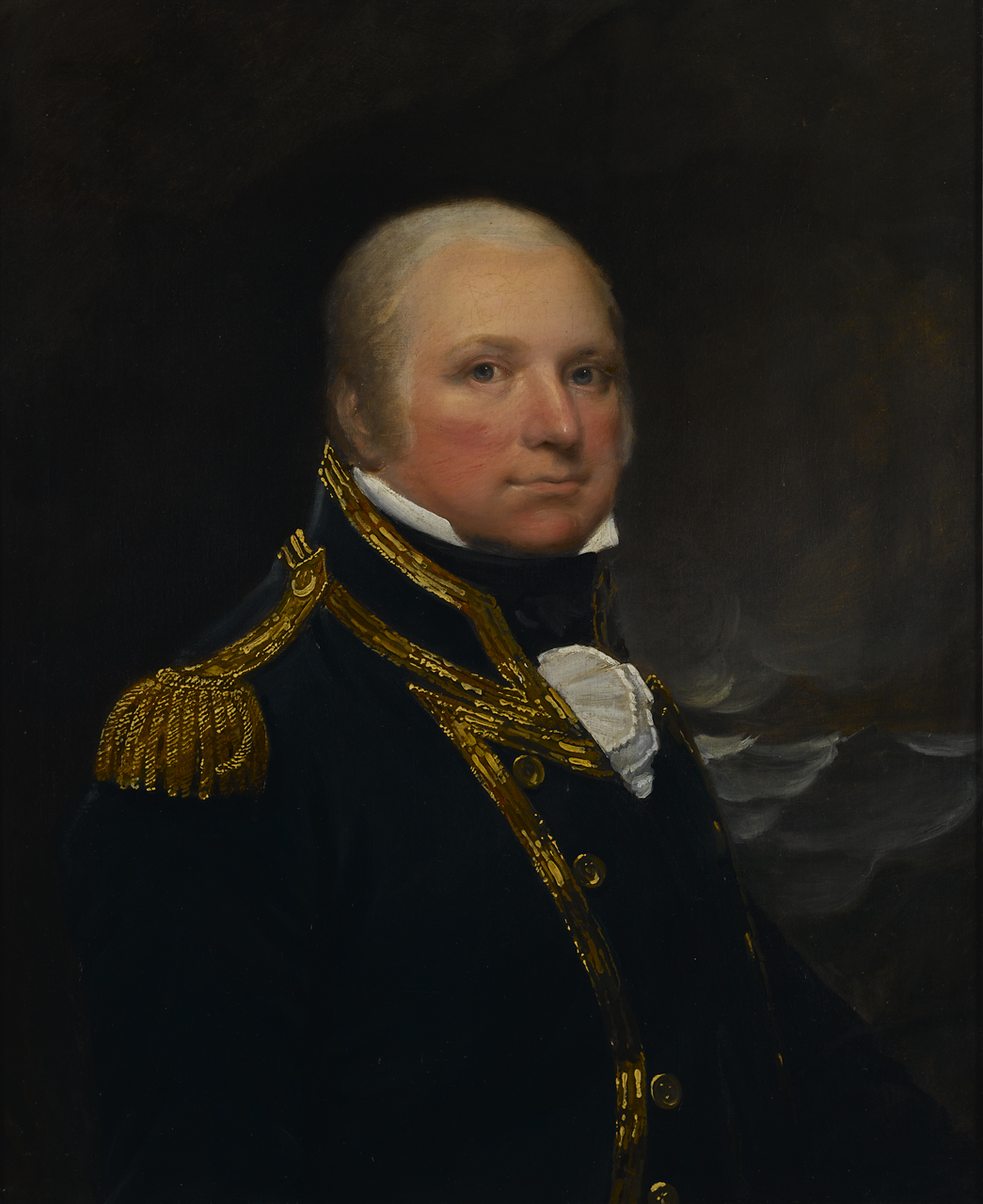
    John Cooke
  - Horatio Nelson, 1st Viscount Nelson, British admiral (mortally wounded in battle) (b. 1758)
- November 24 – Jacques Antoine Marie de Cazalès, French orator, politician (b. 1758)
- December 16 – Saverio Cassar, Gozitan priest, rebel leader (b. 1746)
- December 23
  - Pehr Osbeck, Swedish explorer, naturalist (b. 1723)
  - Geneviève Thiroux d'Arconville, French novelist, translator and chemist (b. 1720)

=== Undated ===
- Rafaela Herrera, Nicaraguan heroine (b. 1742)
- Bety of Betsimisaraka, queen regnant (b. 1735)

1806

=== January–June ===
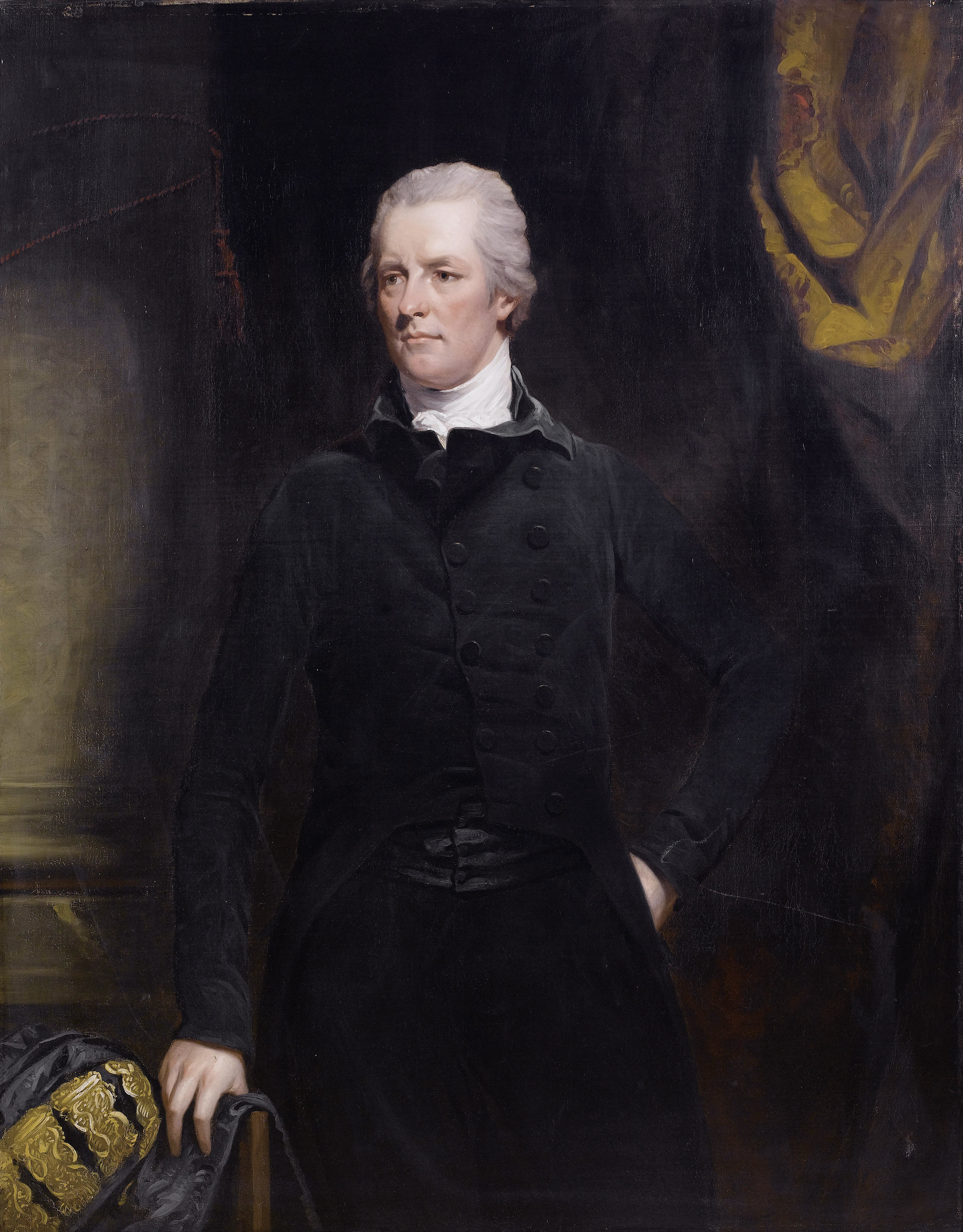
William Pitt the Younger

- January 8 – Magdalena Dávalos y Maldonado, Ecuadorian scholar, socialite (b. 1725)
- January 23 – William Pitt the Younger, Prime Minister of the United Kingdom (b. 1759)
- February 2 – Nicolas Restif de la Bretonne, French writer (b. 1734)
- February 16 – Franz von Weyrother, Austrian general (b. 1755)
- February 19 – Elizabeth Carter, English writer (b. 1717)
- February 20 – Lachlan McIntosh, Scottish-born American military and political leader (b. 1725)
- March 20 – Salomea Deszner, Polish actress, singer and theater director (b. 1759)
- March 30 – Georgiana Cavendish, Duchess of Devonshire, English noblewoman, socialite, political organizer, style icon, author and activist (b. 1757)
- April 9 – William V, Prince of Orange, last Stadtholder of the Dutch Republic (b. 1748)
- April 10 – Horatio Gates, British soldier, served as an American general during the American Revolutionary War (b. 1727)
- April 22 – Pierre-Charles Villeneuve, French admiral (stabbed) (b. 1763)
- May 9 – Robert Morris, English-born merchant, one of the Founding Fathers of the United States, "financier of the American Revolution" (b. 1734)
- May 24 – John Campbell, 5th Duke of Argyll, British field marshal (b. 1723)
- June 23 – Mathurin Jacques Brisson, French naturalist (b. 1723)

=== July–December ===
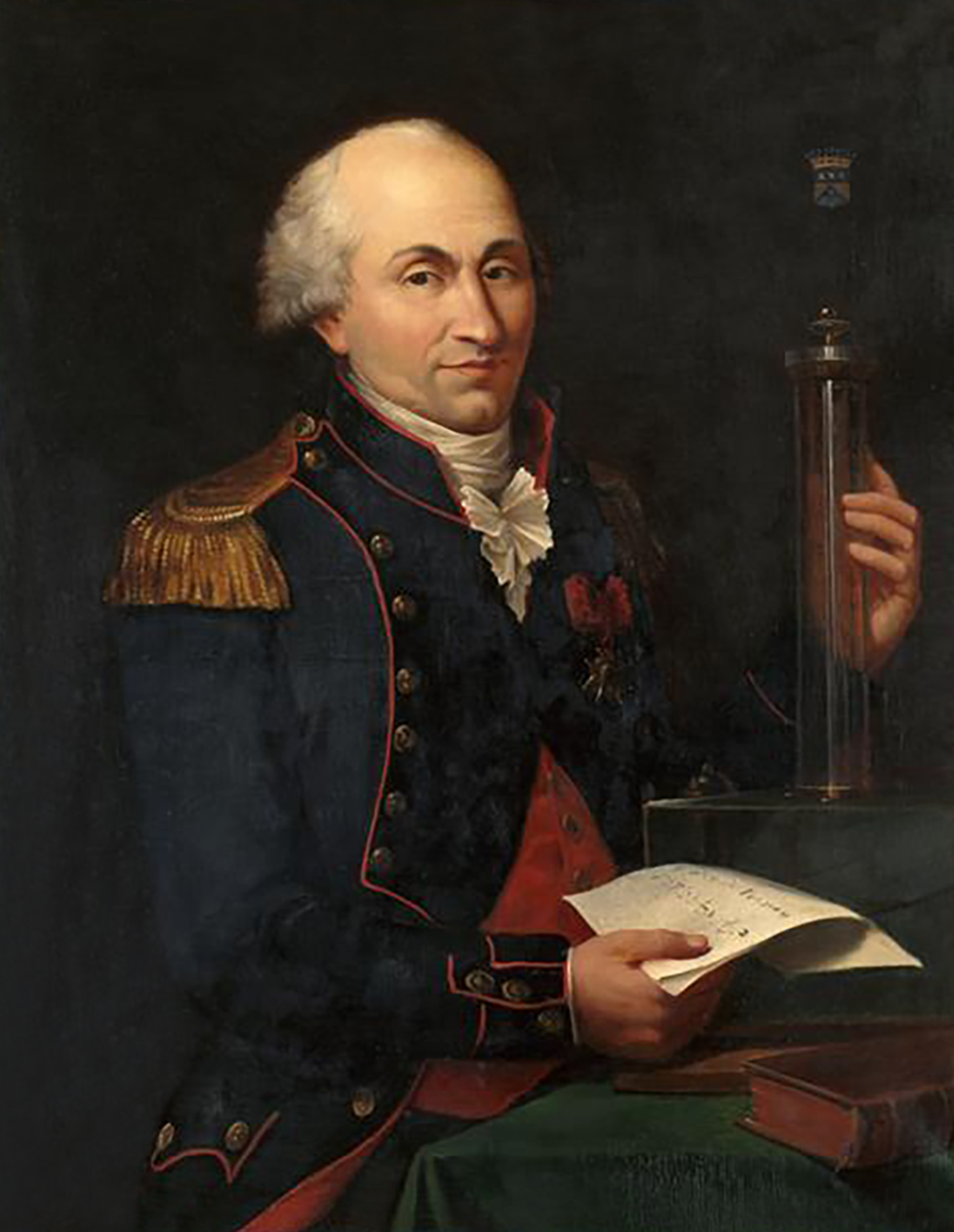
Charles-Augustin de Coulomb

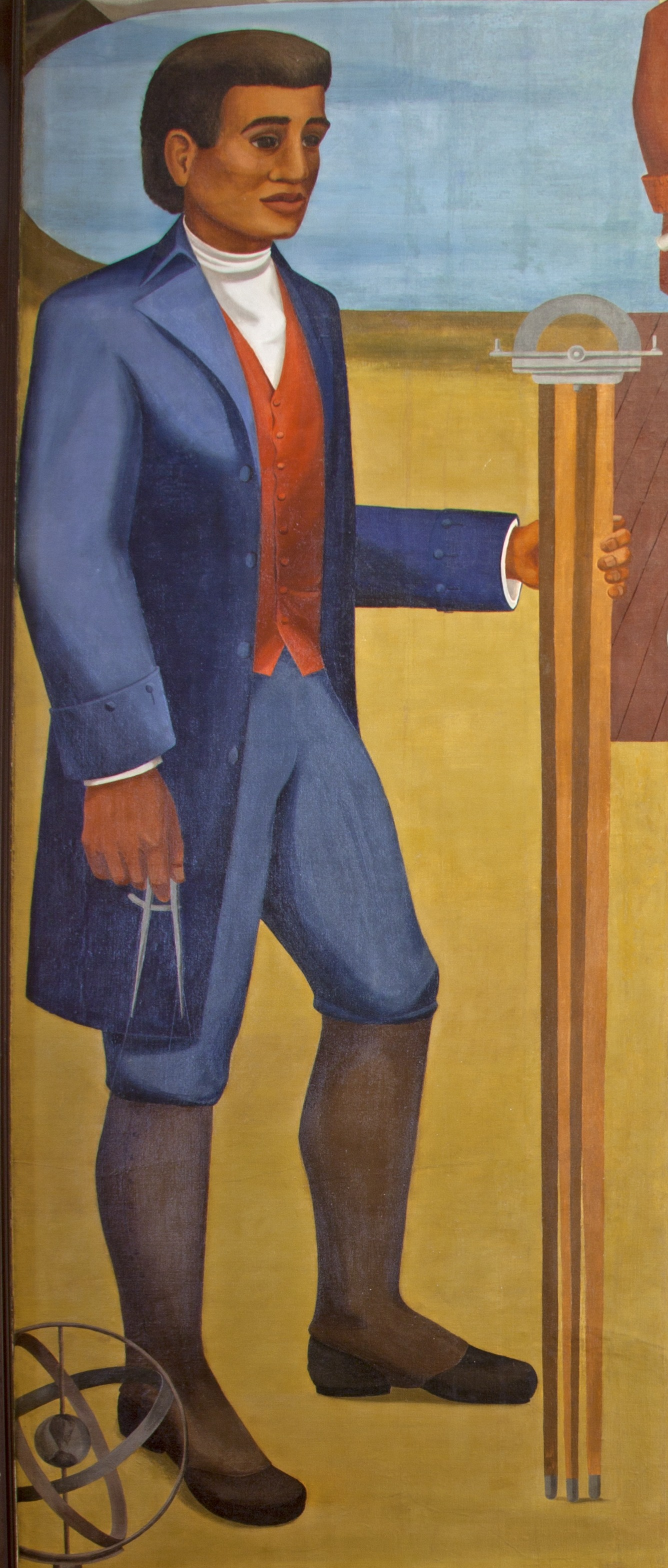
Benjamin Banneker

- July 4 – Charles Henri Sanson, Royal Executioner of France during the reign of King Louis XVI (b. 1739)
- July 10 – George Stubbs, English animal painter (b. 1724)
- July 11 – James Smith, Irish-born American lawyer and politician, signer of the United States Declaration of Independence (b. 1719)
- July 16 – Johann Gottfried Arnold, German cellist (lung infection) (b. 1773)
- August 10 – Michael Haydn, Austrian composer and brother of Joseph Haydn (b. 1737)
- August 22 – Jean-Honoré Fragonard, French painter (b. 1742)
- August 23 – Charles-Augustin de Coulomb, French physicist (b. 1736)
- September 9 – William Paterson, Irish-born American judge, signer of the United States Constitution, Governor of New Jersey (b. 1745)
- September 13 – Charles James Fox, English politician (b. 1749)
- September 30 – William Fortescue, 1st Earl of Clermont, Irish politician (b. 1722)
- October 9 – Benjamin Banneker, American astronomer and surveyor (b. 1731)
- October 10 – Louis Ferdinand of Prussia, German prince (killed in battle) (b. 1772)
- October 25 – Henry Knox, Secretary of War under George Washington (b. 1750)
- October 26 – John Graves Simcoe, English army officer and colonial administrator, first Lieutenant-Governor of Upper Canada (b. 1752)
- November 10 – Karl Wilhelm Ferdinand, Duke of Brunswick, German ruling prince and general (died of wounds) (b. 1735)
- November 23 – Roger Newdigate, English politician (b. 1719)
- December 9 – Josef Georg Hörl, Austrian politician (b. 1722)

=== Date unknown ===
- Mungo Park, Scottish explorer (drowned in attack) (b. 1771)

1807

=== January–June ===
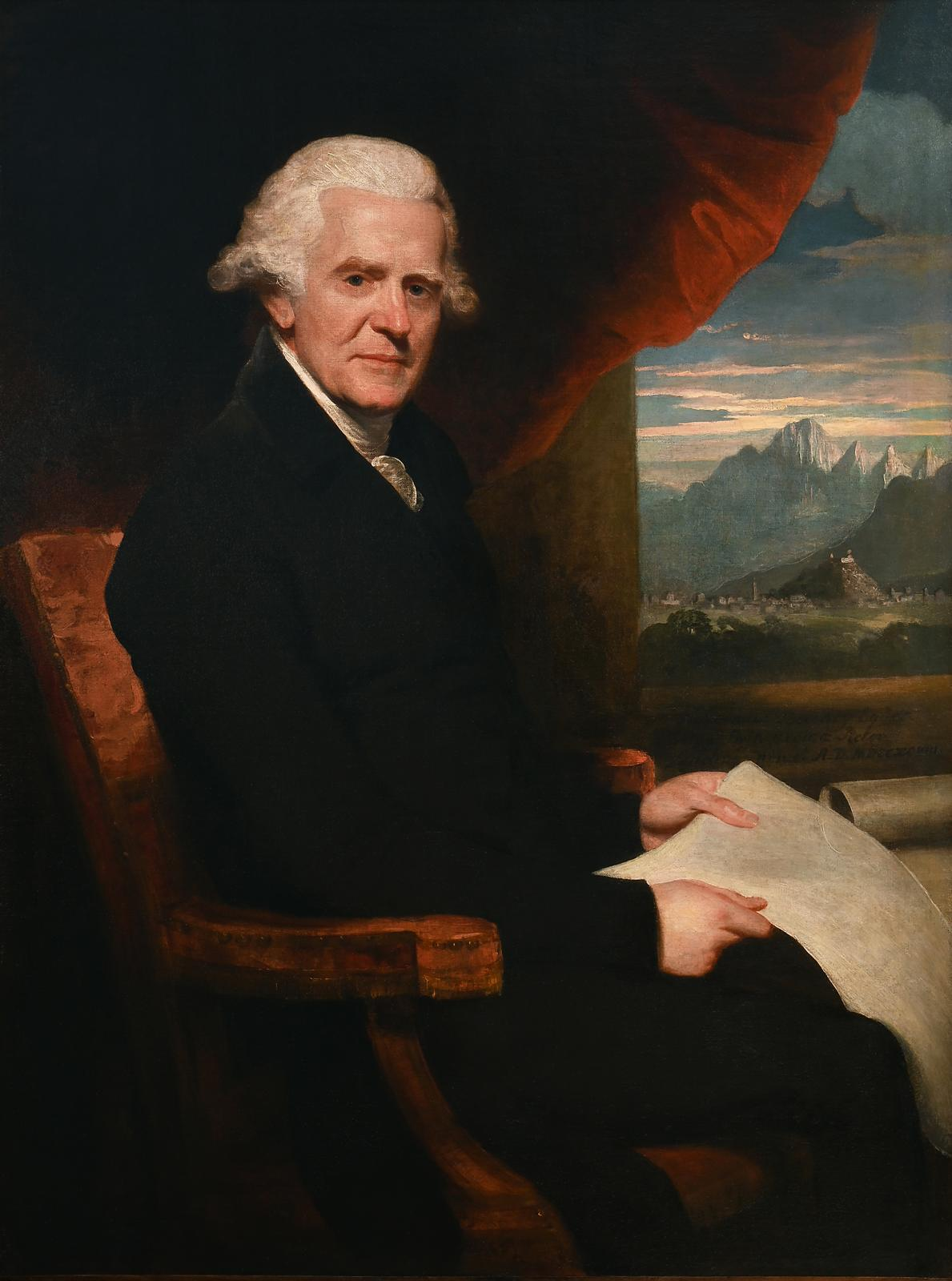
Pasquale Paoli

- February 1 – Sir Thomas Troubridge, 1st Baronet, British admiral (b. c. 1758)
- February 5 – Pasquale Paoli, Corsican patriot, military leader (b. 1725)
- February 27 – Louise du Pierry, French astronomer (b. 1746)
- March 10 – Jean Thurel, French soldier (b. 1698)
- April 4 – Jérôme Lalande, French astronomer (b. 1732)
- April 10 – Duchess Anna Amalia of Brunswick-Wolfenbüttel, regent of Weimar and Eisenach (b. 1739)
- May 10 – Jean-Baptiste Donatien de Vimeur, comte de Rochambeau, French soldier (b. 1725)
- May 13 – Eliphalet Dyer, American statesman, judge (b. 1721)
- May 17 – John Gunby, Maryland soldier in the American Revolutionary War (b. 1745)
- May 18 – John Douglas, Scottish Anglican bishop, man of letters (b. 1721)
- June 9 – Andrew Sterett, American naval officer (b. 1778)

=== July–December ===
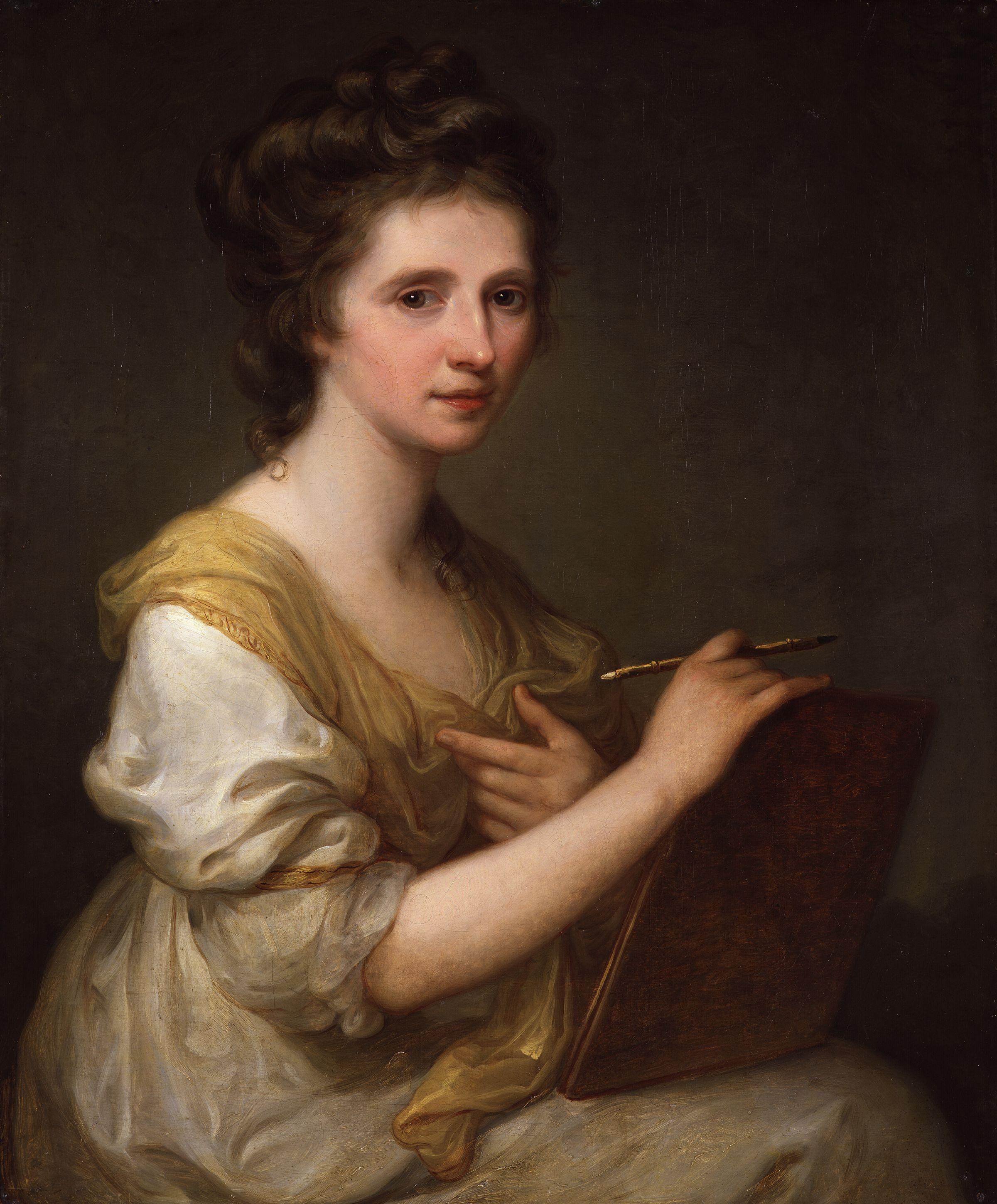
Angelica Kauffman

- July 13 – Henry Benedict Stuart, Italian-born cardinal, Jacobite claimant to the British throne (b. 1725)
- July 19 – Uriah Tracy, American politician and congressman from Connecticut, 1793 until 1807 (b. 1755)
- 5 August – Jeanne Baret French explorer, naturalist, botanist (b. 1740)
- September 14 – George Townshend, 1st Marquess Townshend, British field marshal (b. 1724)
- October 22 – Jean-François Houbigant, French perfumer (b. 1752)
- November 2 – Louis Auguste Le Tonnelier de Breteuil, Prime Minister of King Louis XVI of France (b. 1730)
- November 5 – Angelica Kauffman, Swiss painter (b. 1741)
- November 8
  - Darejan Dadiani, Georgian queen consort (b. 1738)
  - Pierre-Alexandre-Laurent Forfait, French engineer, hydrographer, politician, and Minister of the Navy (1799–1801) (b. 1752)
- November 23 – Jean-François Rewbell, French politician (b. 1747)
- November 26 – Oliver Ellsworth, American founding father and 3rd Chief Justice of the United States (b. 1745)
- December 19 – Friedrich Melchior, Baron von Grimm, German writer (b. 1723)
- December 21 – John Newton, English cleric, hymnist (b. 1725)
- December 29 – Diogo de Carvalho e Sampayo, Portuguese diplomat, scientist (b. 1750)

1808

=== January–June ===
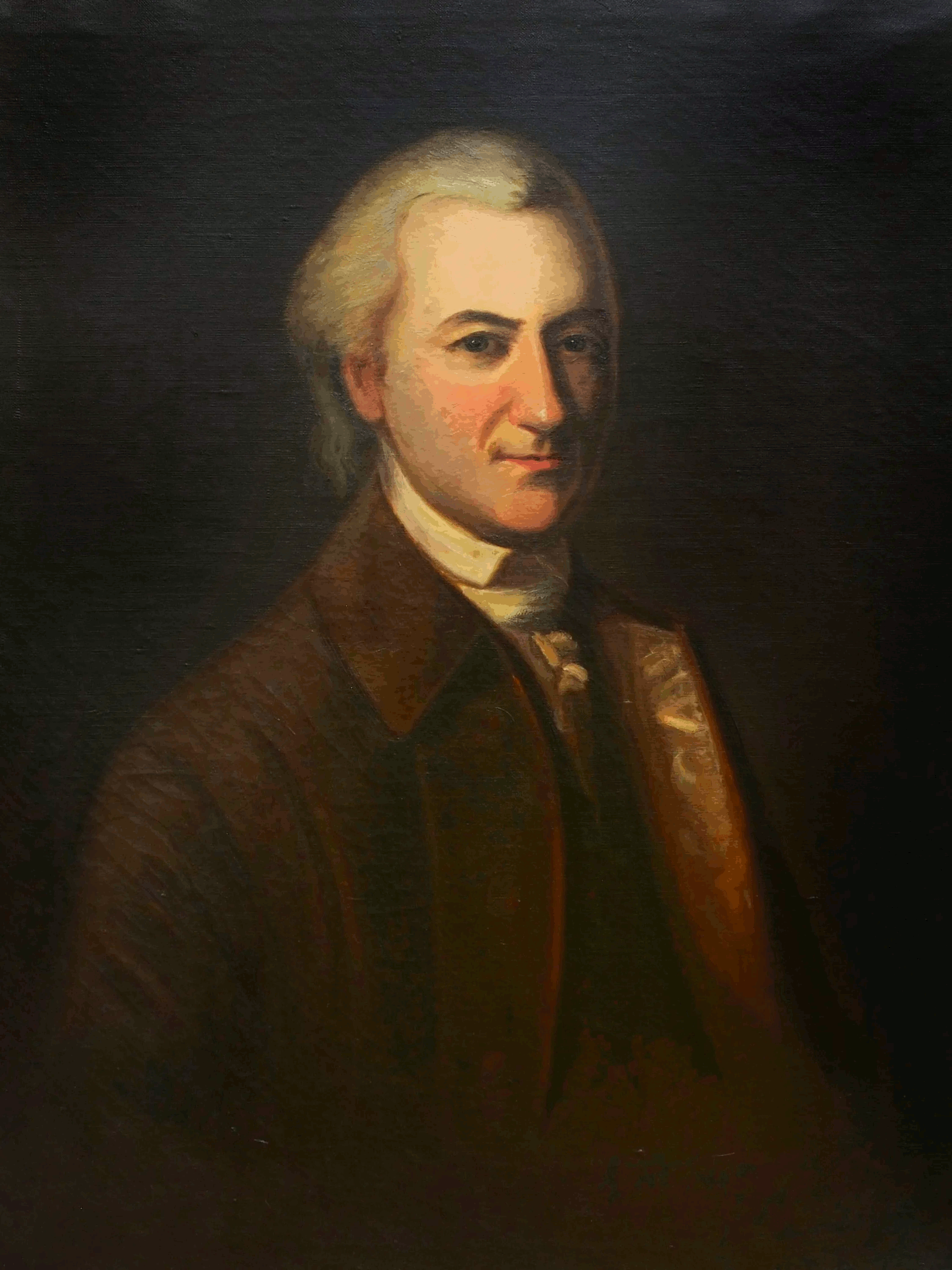
John Dickinson

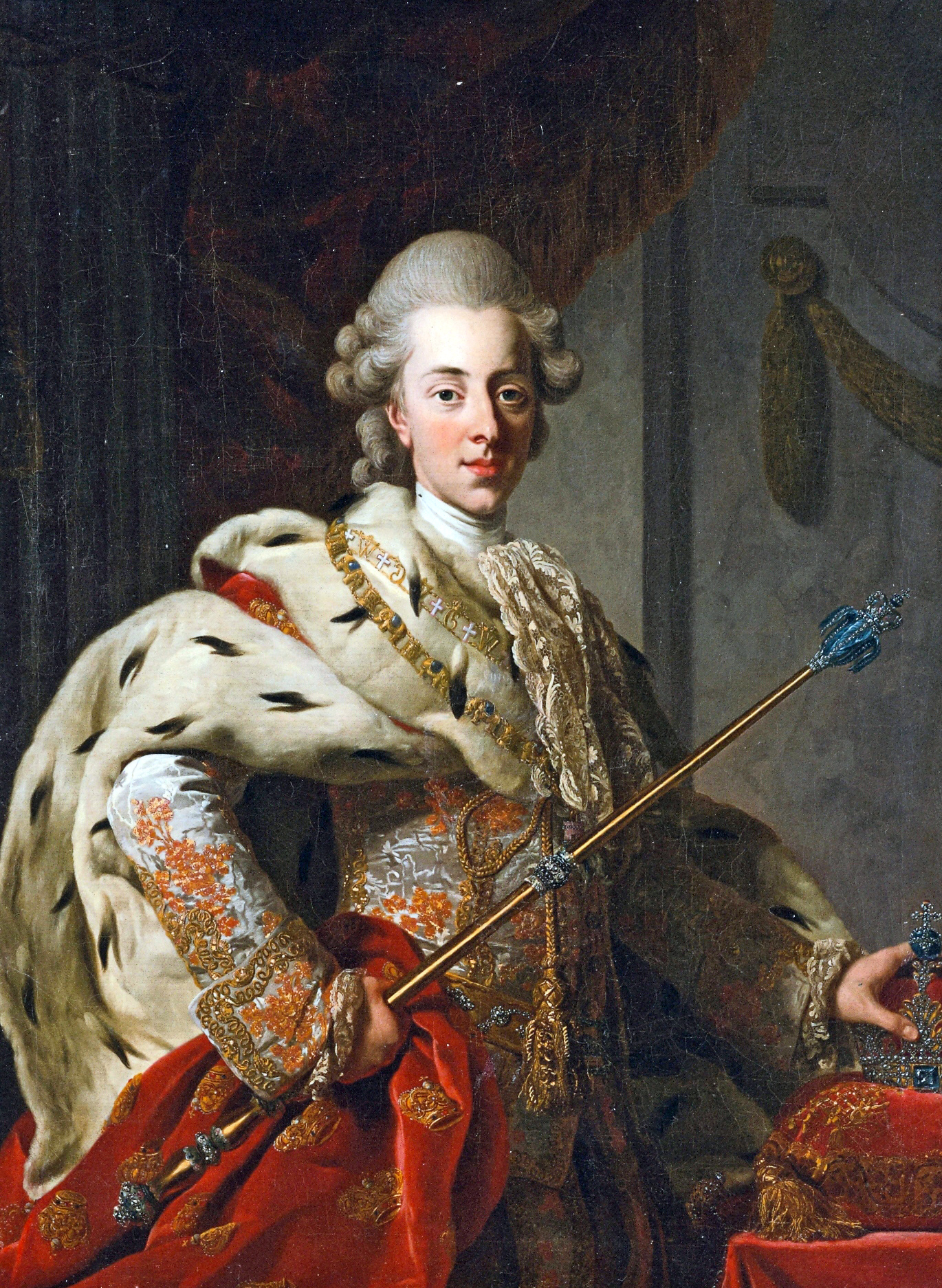
Christian VII, King of Denmark

- January 4 – Prince Benedetto, Duke of Chablais, Italian general in the French Revolution (b. 1741)
- January 5 – Alexei Grigoryevich Orlov, Russian soldier and statesman (b. 1737)
- January 8 – William Linn, American President of Queen's College) (b. 1752)
- February 12 – Anna Maria Bennett, English novelist (d. 1750)
- February 14 – John Dickinson, American lawyer, governor of Delaware and Pennsylvania (b. 1732)
- March 13 – King Christian VII of Denmark (b. 1749)
- May 18 – Elijah Craig, American minister, inventor (b. 1738)
- March 19 – John Redman (physician), American physician (b. 1722)
- May 28 – Richard Hurd, English bishop, writer (b. 1720)

=== July–December ===
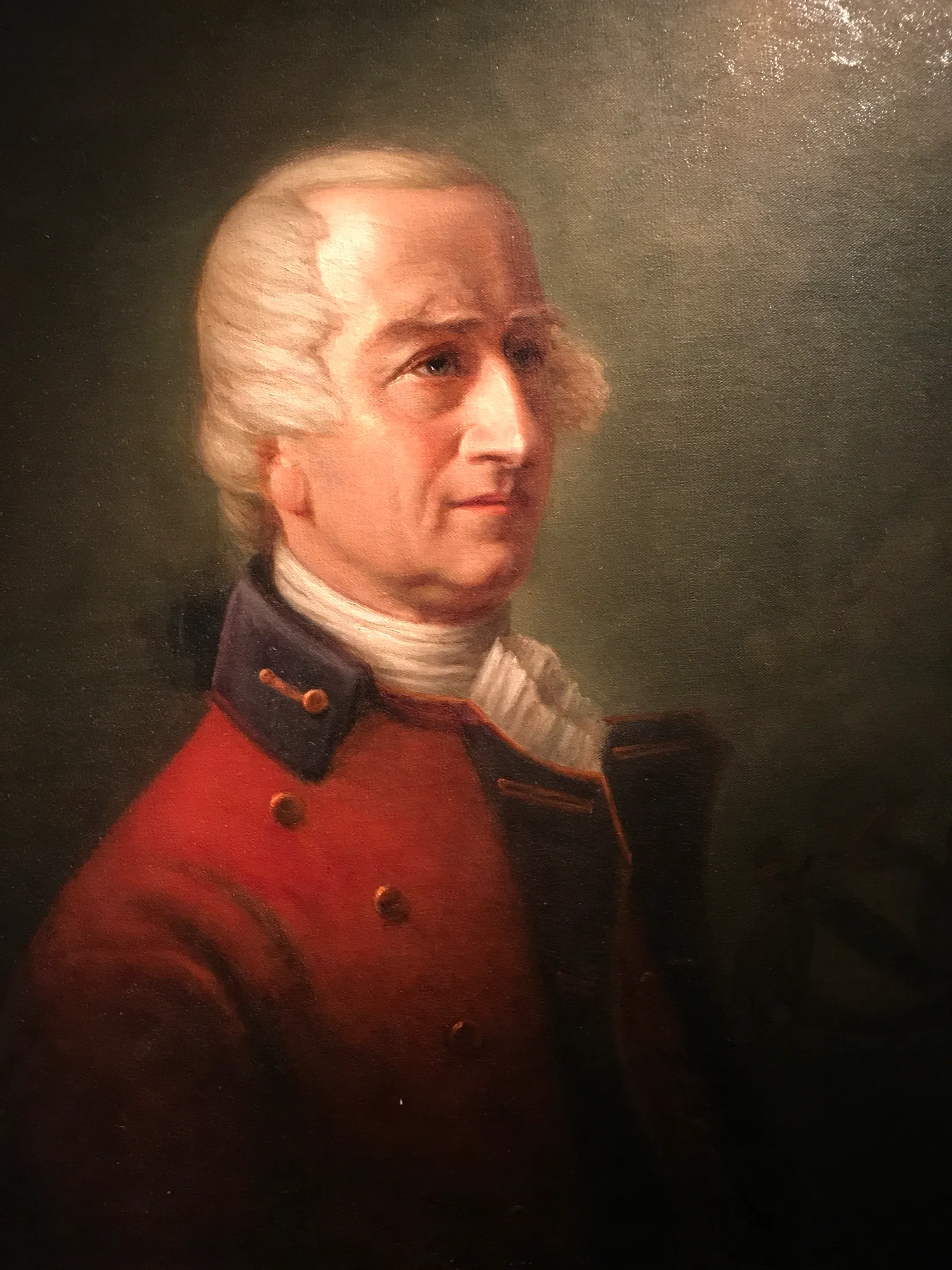
Guy Carleton, 1st Baron Dorchester

- September 3 – John Montgomery, American delegate to the Continental Congress (b. 1722)
- September 5 – John Home, Scottish writer (b. 1722)
- September 6 – Louis-Pierre Anquetil, French historian (b. 1723)
- September 13 – Saverio Bettinelli, Italian writer (b. 1718)
- September 17 – Benjamin Bourne, American politician (b. 1755)
- October 1 – Carl Gotthard Langhans, German architect (b. 1732)
- October 9 – John Claiborne, American politician (b. 1777)
- November 3 – Theophilus Lindsey, English theologian (b. 1723)
- November 10 – Guy Carleton, 1st Baron Dorchester, British soldier, governor of Quebec (b. 1724)
- November 17 – David Zeisberger, Moravian missionary (b. 1721)

1809

=== January–June ===
Joseph Haydn

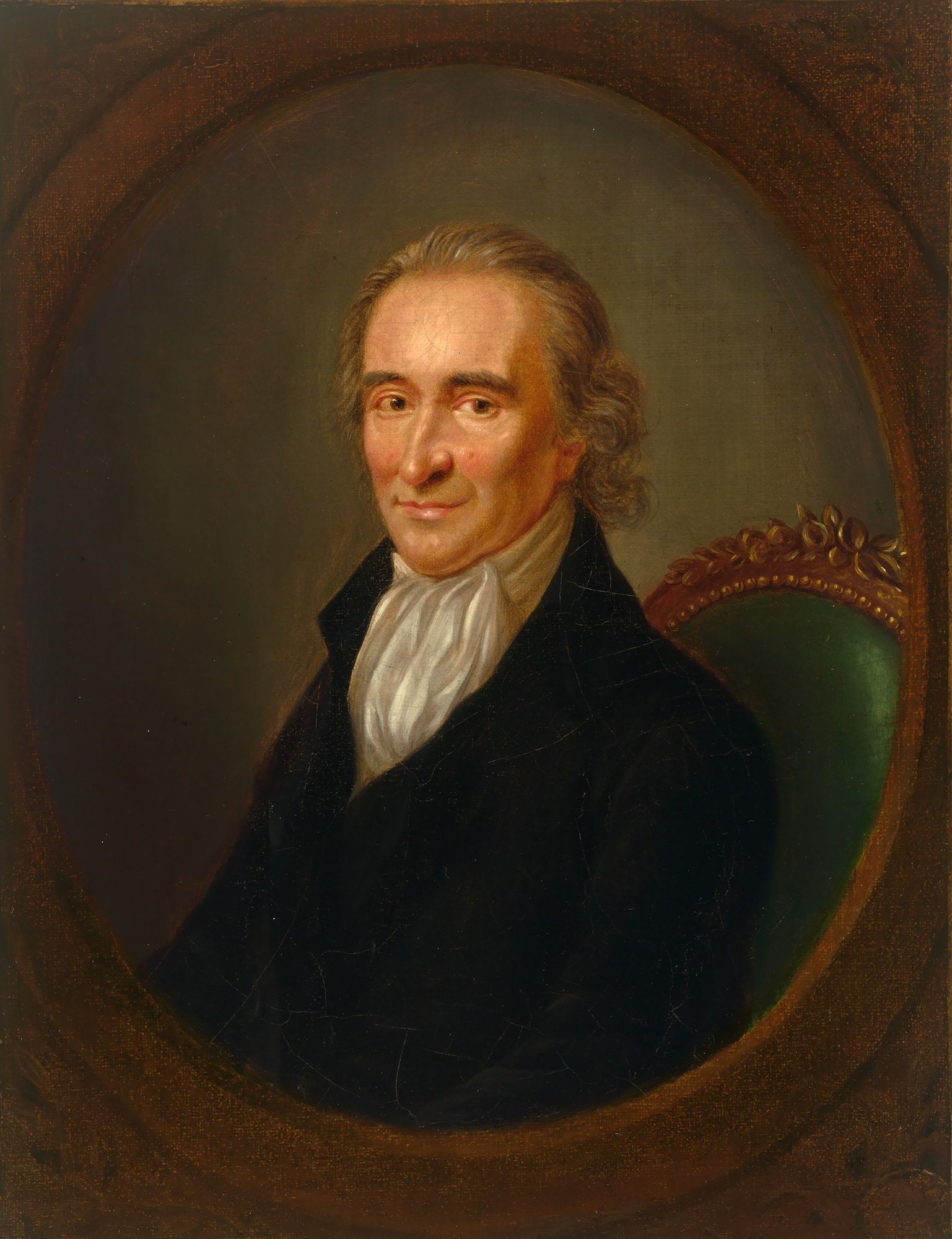
Thomas Paine

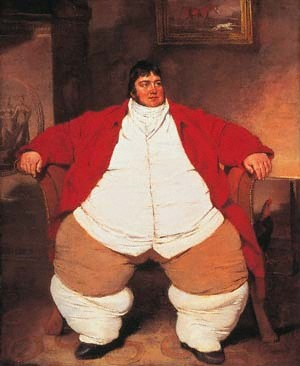
Daniel Lambert

- January 6 – Johann Augustus Eberhard, German theologian, philosopher (b. 1739)
- January 16 – John Moore, British general (killed in battle) (b. 1761)
- February 6 – Antoine Joseph Santerre, French general (b. 1752)
- February 20 – Richard Gough, English antiquary (b. 1735)
- February 25 – John Murray, 4th Earl of Dunmore (Lord Dunmore)(b. 1730)
- March 7 – Johann Georg Albrechtsberger, Austrian composer (b. 1736)
- March 11 – Hannah Cowley, English dramatist and poet (b. 1743)
- March 18 – Karoline Kaulla, German banker (b. 1739)
- March 20 – Mary Bateman, English woman executed for murder, known as the Yorkshire Witch
- March 25 – Anna Seward, English writer (b. 1747)
- March 27 – Joseph-Marie Vien, French painter (b. 1716)
- April 6 – Jean-Pierre Saint-Ours, Swiss artist (b. 1752)
- April 26 – Bernhard Schott, German music publisher (b. 1748)
- May 13 – Beilby Porteus, English bishop, abolitionist (b. 1731)
- May 17 – Leopold Auenbrugger, Austrian physician (b. 1722)
- May 24 – Charles Rainsford, British general (b. 1728)
- May 29 – Johannes von Müller, Swiss historian (b. 1752)
- May 31
  - Joseph Haydn, Austrian classical composer (b. 1732)
  - Jean Lannes, French marshal (mortally wounded in battle (b. 1769)
- June 4 – Nicolai Abildgaard, Danish painter (b. 1743)
- June 8 – Thomas Paine, American revolutionary writer (b. 1737)
- June 15 – Sir George Baker, 1st Baronet, British physician (b. 1722)
- June 21 – Daniel Lambert, English jail keeper and animal breeder, famous for his unusually large size (b. 1770)

=== July–December ===
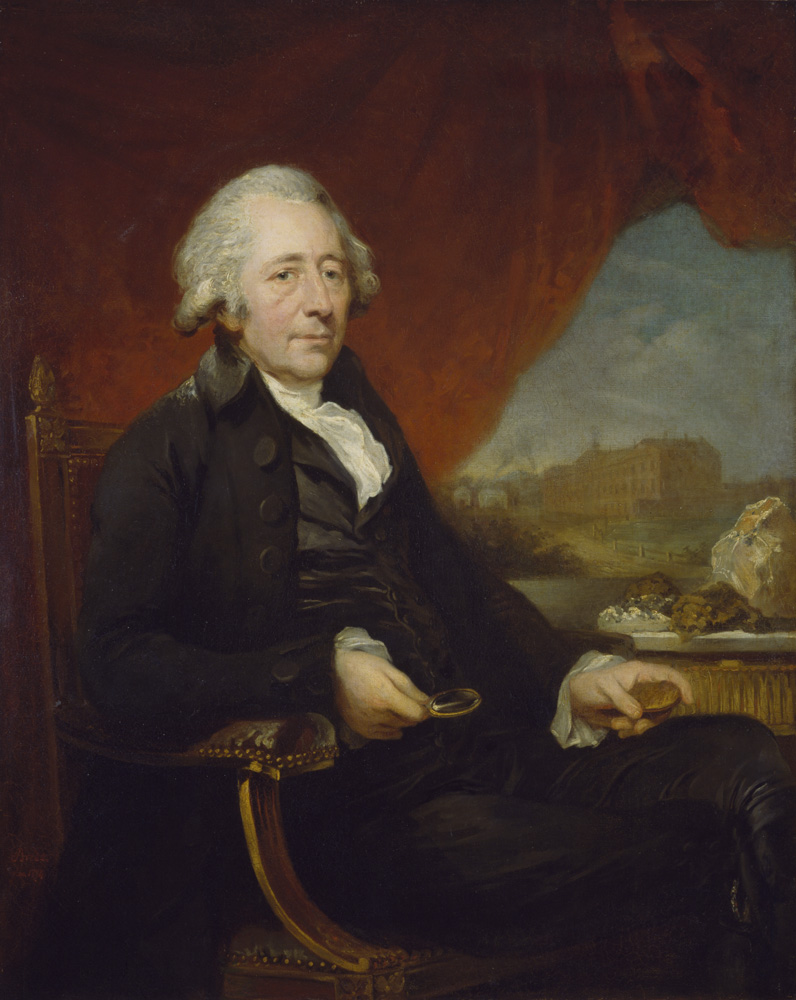
Matthew Boulton

- July 6 – Antoine Charles Louis de Lasalle, French cavalry general (killed in battle) (b. 1775)
- July 22 – Jean Senebier, Swiss pastor, botanist (b. 1742)
- August 8 – Ueda Akinari, Japanese author, scholar (b. 1734)
- August 18 – Matthew Boulton, English manufacturer, engineer (b. 1728)
- August 29 – Lucy Barnes, American writer (b. 1780)
- September 1 – Johann Friedrich August Göttling, German chemist (b. 1753)
- September 3 – George Coventry, 6th Earl of Coventry, English noble and politician (b. 1722)
- September 7
  - Buddha Yodfa Chulaloke (Rama I), King of Siam, founder of the Chakri dynasty of Thailand (b. 1737)
  - Caroline Schelling, German scholar (b. 1763)
- October 8 – James Elphinston, Scottish philologist (b. 1721)
- October 11 – Meriwether Lewis, American explorer (suicide) (b. 1774)
- October 30 – William Cavendish-Bentinck, 3rd Duke of Portland, Prime Minister of the United Kingdom (b. 1738)
- November 28 – Jakob Heinrich Laspeyres, German lepidopterist (b. 1769)
- December 16 – Antoine François, comte de Fourcroy, French chemist (b. 1755)
