= 1802 =

1802 in various calendars
- Gregorian calendar: 1802; MDCCCII
- French Republican calendar: 10–11; X–XI
- Ab urbe condita: 2555
- Armenian calendar: 1251; ԹՎ ՌՄԾԱ
- Assyrian calendar: 6552
- Balinese saka calendar: 1723–1724
- Bengali calendar: 1208–1209
- Berber calendar: 2752
- British Regnal year: 42 Geo. 3 – 43 Geo. 3
- Buddhist calendar: 2346
- Burmese calendar: 1164
- Byzantine calendar: 7310–7311
- Chinese calendar: 辛酉年 (Metal Rooster); 4499 or 4292 — to — 壬戌年 (Water Dog); 4500 or 4293
- Coptic calendar: 1518–1519
- Discordian calendar: 2968
- Ethiopian calendar: 1794–1795
- Hebrew calendar: 5562–5563
- Hindu calendars
- Vikram Samvat: 1858–1859
- Shaka Samvat: 1723–1724
- Kali Yuga: 4902–4903
- Holocene calendar: 11802
- Igbo calendar: 802–803
- Iranian calendar: 1180–1181
- Islamic calendar: 1216–1217
- Japanese calendar: Kansei 14 / Kyōwa 1 (享和元年)
- Javanese calendar: 1728–1729
- Julian calendar: Gregorian minus 12 days
- Korean calendar: 4135
- Minguo calendar: 110 before ROC 民前110年
- Nanakshahi calendar: 334
- Thai solar calendar: 2344–2345
- Tibetan calendar: ལྕགས་མོ་བྱ་ལོ་ (female Iron-Bird); 1928 or 1547 or 775 — to — ཆུ་ཕོ་ཁྱི་ལོ་ (male Water-Dog); 1929 or 1548 or 776

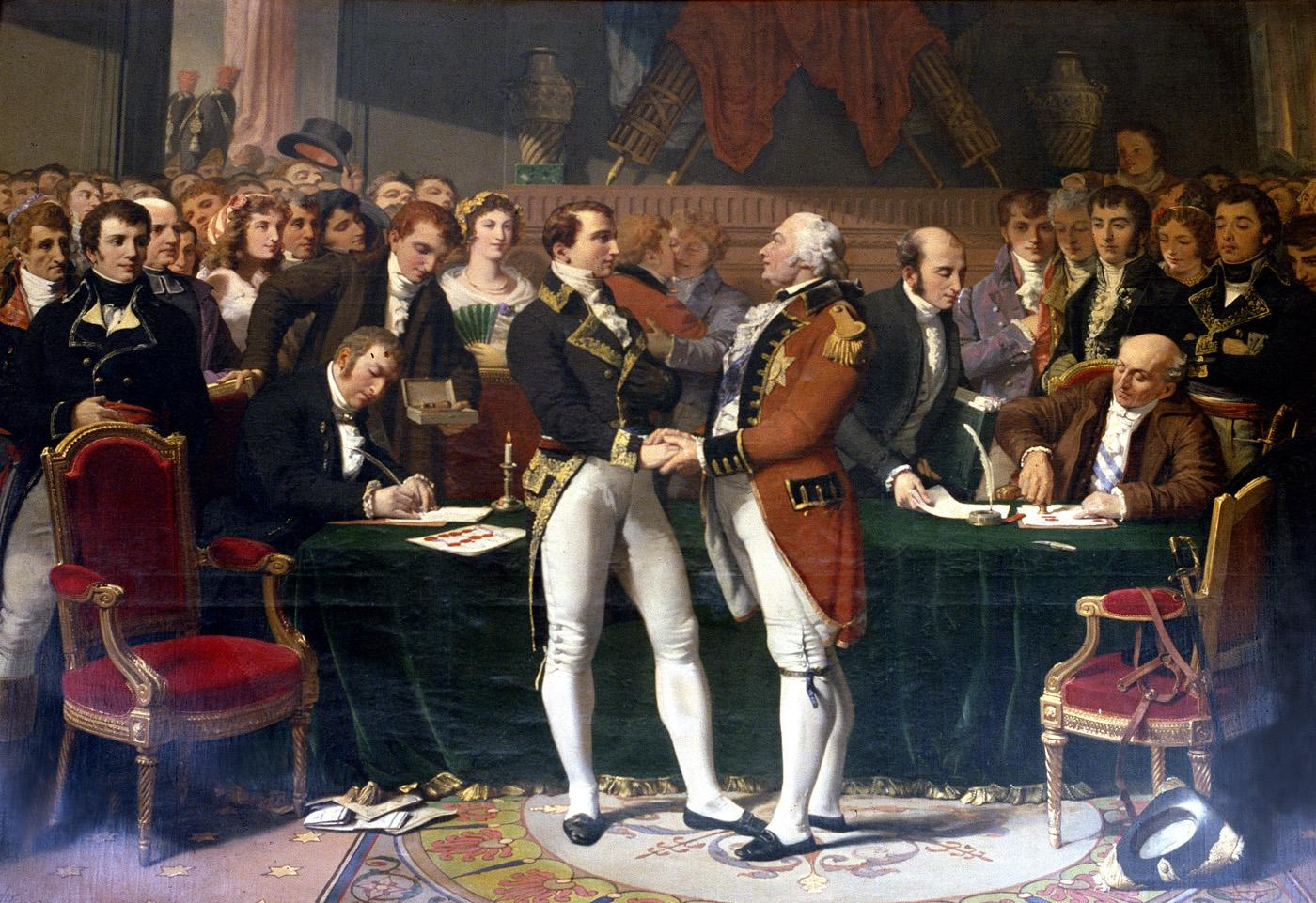
March 25: The Treaty of Amiens is signed.

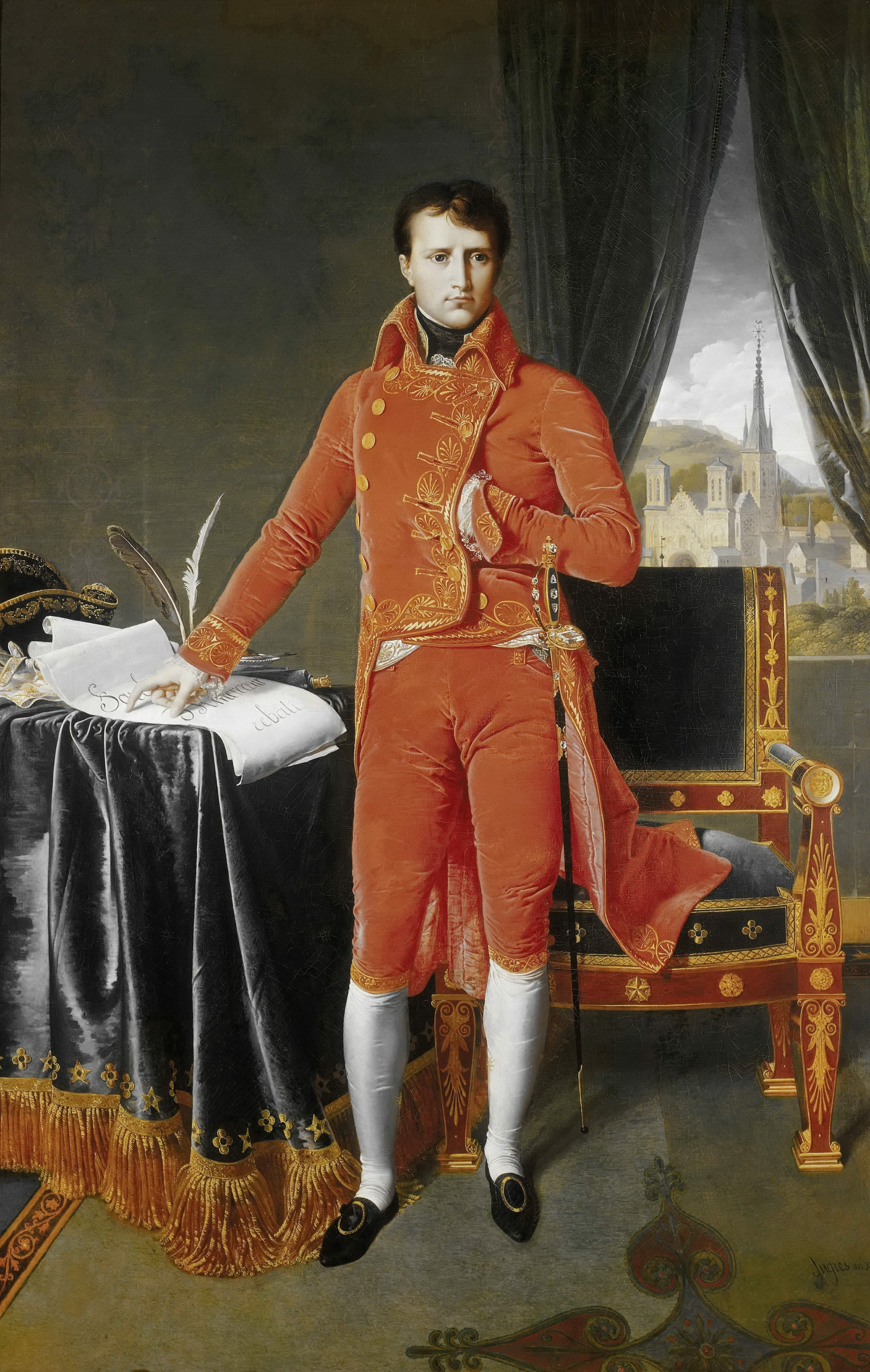
August 2: Napoleon is confirmed as the First Consul of France.

1802 (MDCCCII) was a common year starting on Friday of the Gregorian calendar and a common year starting on Wednesday of the Julian calendar, the 1802nd year of the Common Era (CE) and Anno Domini (AD) designations, the 802nd year of the 2nd millennium, the 2nd year of the 19th century, and the 3rd year of the 1800s decade. As of the start of 1802, the Gregorian calendar was 12 days ahead of the Julian calendar, which remained in localized use until 1923.

== Events ==
=== January–March ===
- January 5 – Thomas Bruce, 7th Earl of Elgin, British ambassador to the Ottoman Empire, begins removal of the Elgin Marbles from the Parthenon in Athens, claiming they are at risk of destruction during the Ottoman occupation of Greece; the first shipment departs Piraeus on board Elgin's ship, the Mentor, "with many boxes of moulds and sculptures", including three marble torsos from the Parthenon.
- January 15 – Canonsburg Academy (modern-day Washington & Jefferson College) is chartered by the Pennsylvania General Assembly.
- January 29 – The French Saint-Domingue expedition (40,000 troops) led by General Charles Leclerc (Bonaparte's brother-in-law) lands in Saint-Domingue (modern Haiti) in an attempt to restore colonial rule following the Haitian Revolution in which Toussaint Louverture (a black former slave) has proclaimed himself Governor-General for Life and established control over Hispaniola.
- February 3 – Leclerc and the first 5,000 of 20,000 troops arrive at Cap-François (modern Cap-Haïtien).
- February 17 – The remains of Pope Pius VI are returned to the Vatican by France; the Pope had died in captivity at Valence, on August 29, 1799.
- February – The Rosetta Stone is brought to England by Colonel Tomkyns Hilgrove Turner, who arrives at Portsmouth on the captured French frigate L'Egyptiane.
- March 3 – Ludwig van Beethoven publishes his Piano Sonata No. 14, commonly known as the "Moonlight Sonata" (Mondschein), in Vienna; the availability of the sheet music is announced by Giovanni Cappi in the newspaper Wiener Zeitung.
- March 11 – The Rosetta Stone is presented to the Society of Antiquaries of London, which in turn presents it to the British Museum.
- March 16 – The United States Army Corps of Engineers is re-established, and the United States Military Academy at West Point, New York is established under its management, opening on July 4.
- March 25–27 – The Treaty of Amiens between the French Republic and the United Kingdom ends the War of the Second Coalition. The treaty also ends the French Revolutionary Wars.
- March 28 – H. W. Olbers discovers the asteroid Pallas.

=== April–June ===
- April 10 – The Great Trigonometrical Survey of India begins with the measurement of a baseline near Madras.
- April 12 — Beethoven leaves Vienna for a small nearby Austrian village named Heiligenstadt where he would cope with his declining mental and physical health including his growing deafness. He would stay until October and there he would write an unsent letter to his brothers called the Heiligenstadt Testament. In the letter, Beethoven contemplates suicide but it was his passion for the art of music that prevented him so.
- April 21 – About 12,000 Wahhabi Sunnis under the command of Abdul-Aziz bin Muhammad, the second ruler of the First Saudi State attack and sack Karbala, kill between 2,000 and 5,000 inhabitants and plunder the tomb of Husayn ibn Ali, grandson of Muhammad and son of Ali ibn Abi Talib.
- April 26 – A general amnesty signed by Napoleon allows all but about 1,000 of the most notorious émigrés of the French Revolution to return to France as part of a conciliatory gesture to make peace with the various factions of the Ancien Régime that ultimately consolidates his own rule.
- May 19 – Napoleon establishes the French Legion of Honour (Légion d'honneur).
- May 20 – By the Law of 20 May 1802, Napoleon reinstates slavery in the French colonies, revoking its abolition in the French Revolution.
- May – Madame Marie Tussaud first exhibits her wax sculptures in London, having been commissioned, during the Reign of Terror in France, to make death masks of the victims.
- June – The first account of Thomas Wedgwood's experiments in photography is published by Humphry Davy in the Journal of the Royal Institution in London. Since a fixative for the image has not yet been developed, the early photographs quickly fade.
- June 1
  - The United States Patent and Trademark Office is established within the Department of State.
  - At Huế, shortly before his conquest of Tonkin, Nguyen Anh is crowned as the Emperor Gia Long, the first ruler of the Nguyễn dynasty in Vietnam.
- June 2 – Indigenous Australian Pemulwuy, a leader of the resistance to European settlement of Australia, is shot dead by Henry Hacking.
- June 8 – Haitian revolutionary Toussaint Louverture is seized by French troops and imprisoned at the Fort de Joux.

=== July–September ===
- July 5 – Parliamentary elections begin in the United Kingdom, with voting continuing until August 28; the Tories, led by Henry Addington, win control of the House of Commons.
- July 19 – Éleuthère Irénée du Pont founds E. I. du Pont de Nemours and Company, the modern DuPont chemical company, as a gunpowder manufactory near Wilmington, Delaware.
- July 22 – Gia Long captures Hanoi, completing his unification of Vietnam.
- July 31 – William Wordsworth, leaving London for Dover and Calais with his sister Dorothy, witnesses the early morning scene which he captures in his sonnet "Composed upon Westminster Bridge".
- August 2 – In a plebiscite, Napoleon Bonaparte is confirmed as the First Consul of France.
- September 11 – The Italian region of Piedmont becomes a part of the French First Republic.

=== October–December ===
- October 2 – War ends between Sweden and Tripoli. The United States also negotiates peace, but war continues over the size of compensation.
- October 15 – French Army General Michel Ney enters Switzerland with 40,000 troops, on orders of Napoleon Bonaparte.
- October 16 – The port of New Orleans and the lower Mississippi River are closed to American traffic by order of the city's Spanish administrator, Juan Ventura Morales, threatening the economy in the western United States, and prompting the need for the Louisiana Purchase.
- October 26 – A powerful 7.9 earthquake shakes the Romanian district of Vrancea destroying hundreds of buildings, triggering landslides and killing 4 people. This earthquake is considered one of the strongest to have shaken Europe.
- November 16 – The newly elected British Parliament is inaugurated by King George III, who tells the members, "In my intercourse with foreign powers, I have been actuated by a sincere disposition of the maintenance of peace," but adds that "My conduct will be invariably regulated by a due consideration of the actual situation of Europe, and by a watchful solicitude for the permanent welfare of my people."
- November 23 – East Indiaman Vryheid, in the service of the Batavian Republic, is shipwrecked in a gale off Hythe, Kent, in the south of England; only 18 of 472 on board survive.
- December 2 – The Health and Morals of Apprentices Act in the United Kingdom comes into effect, regulating conditions for child labour in factories. Although poorly enforced, it pioneers a series of Factory Acts.

== Births ==
=== January–June ===
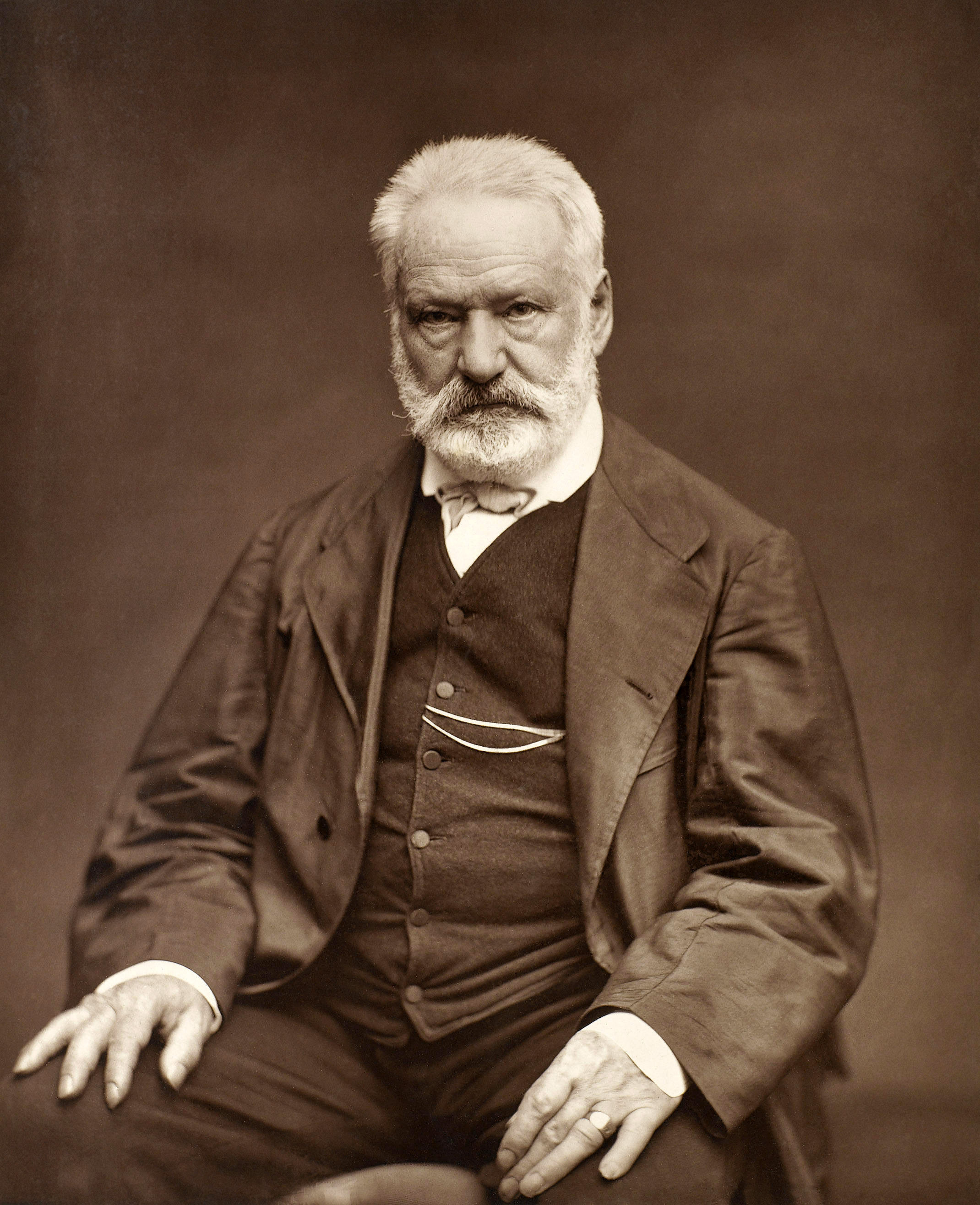
Victor Hugo

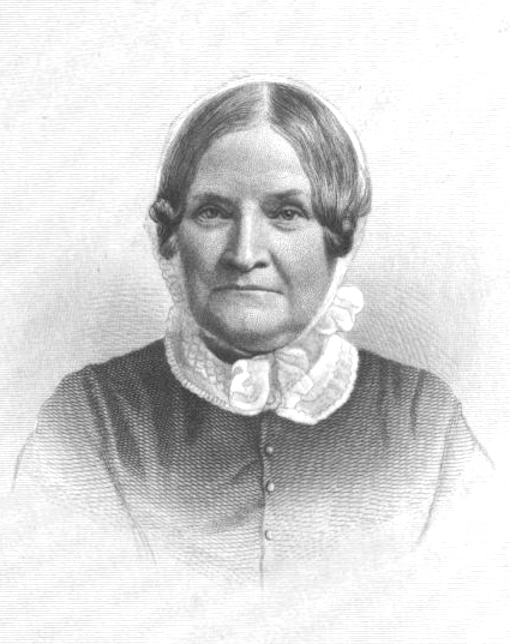
Lydia Maria Child

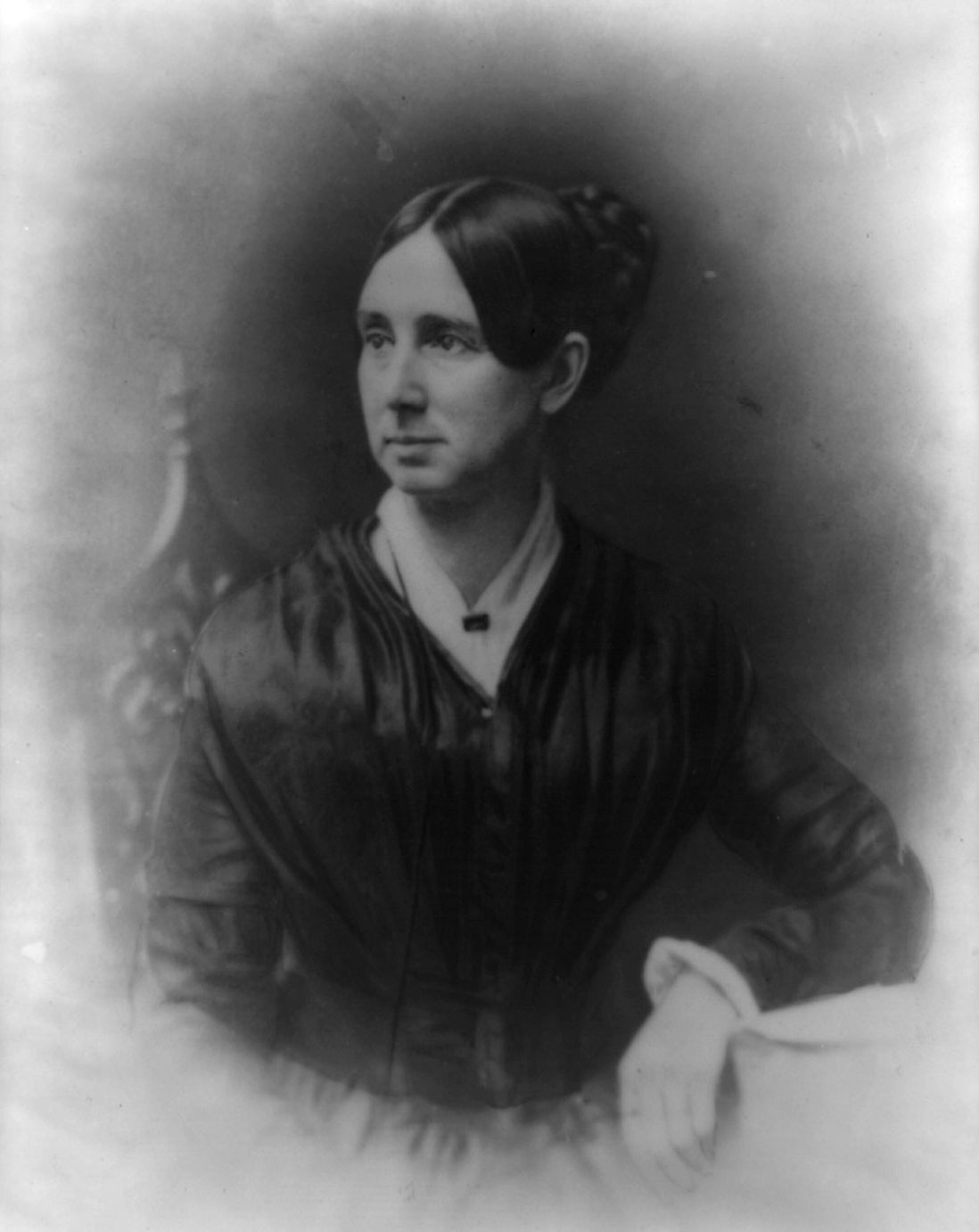
Dorothea Dix

- January 3 – Charles Pelham Villiers, British politician (d. 1898)
- January 10 – Carl Ritter von Ghega, Albanian-born Venetian road engineer (d. 1860)
- January 22 – Richard Upjohn, English-American architect (d. 1878)
- February 6 – Charles Wheatstone, English physicist, inventor (d. 1875)
- February 11 – Lydia Maria Child, American abolitionist author (d. 1880)
- February 15 – Jean-Jacques Uhrich, French general (d. 1886)
- February 16 – Phineas Quimby, American physician (d. 1866)
- February 19 – Wilhelm Matthias Naeff, Swiss Federal Councillor (d. 1881)
- February 26 – Victor Hugo, French author (d. 1885)
- March 7 – Edwin Henry Landseer, British painter (d. 1873)
- March 8 – Zebulon Crocker, American congregationalist pastor (d. 1847)
- March 25 – Maria Silfvan, Finnish actor (d. 1865)
- March 27 – Charles-Mathias Simons, Prime Minister of Luxembourg (d. 1874)
- April 4 – Dorothea Dix, American activist (d. 1887)
- April 9 – Elias Lönnrot, Finnish folklorist, philologist who created the Finnish national epic, the Kalevala (d. 1884)
- May 2 – Heinrich Gustav Magnus, German chemist, physicist (d. 1870)
- May 26 – Karl Ferdinand Ranke, German educator (d. 1876)
- June 12 – Harriet Martineau, British social theorist, writer (d. 1876)

=== July–December ===
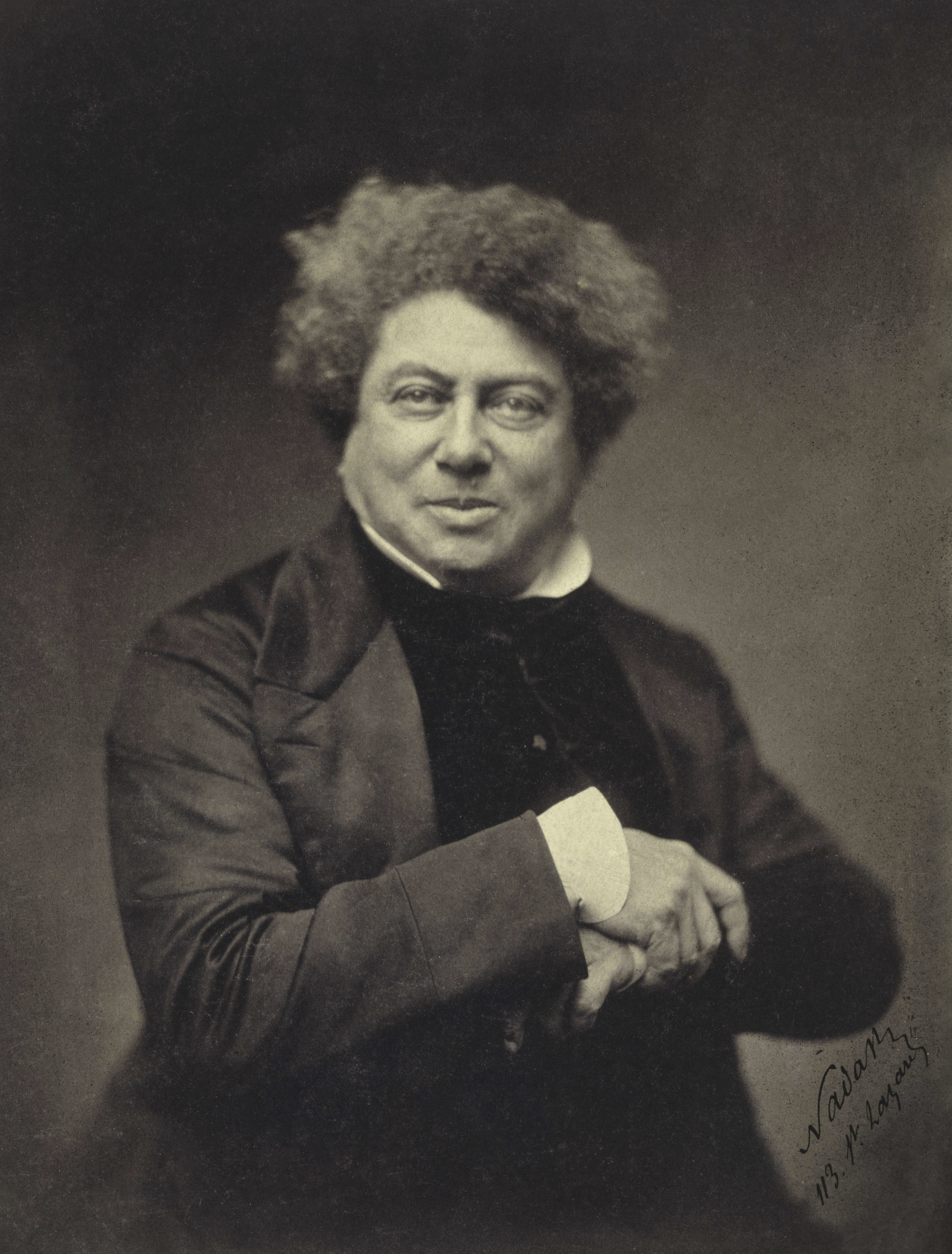
Alexandre Dumas

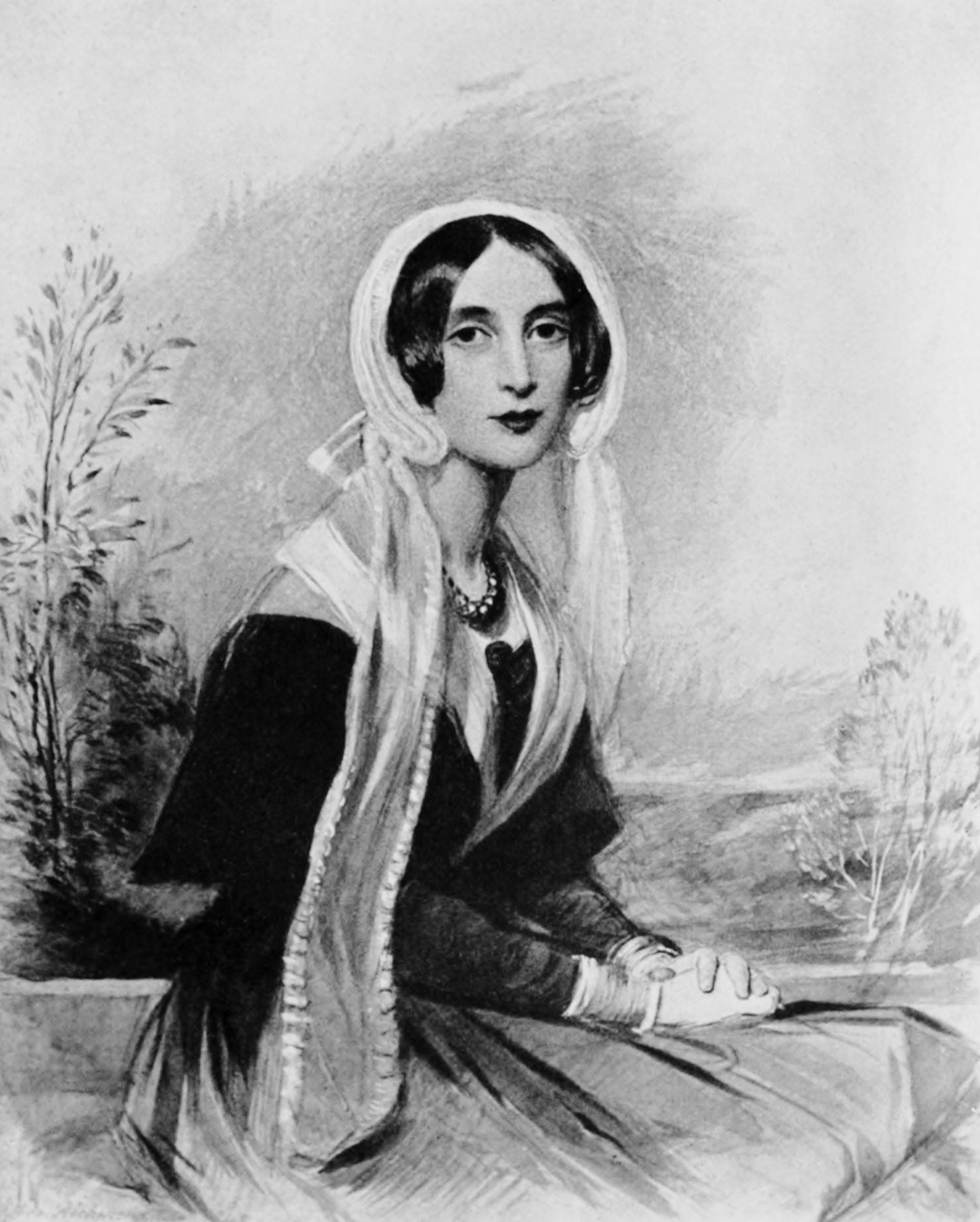
Sara Coleridge

- July 5 (June 23 O.S.) – Pavel Nakhimov, Russian admiral (d. 1855)
- July 24 – Alexandre Dumas, French author (d. 1870)
- July 26 – Mariano Arista, President of Mexico (d. 1855)
- August 4 – Joseph Bonnell, hero of the Texas Revolution (d. 1840)
- August 5 – Niels Henrik Abel, Norwegian mathematician (d. 1829)
- August 31 – Karl von Urban, Austrian field marshal (d. 1877)
- September 19 – Lajos Kossuth, Hungarian politician (d. 1894)
- September 30 – Antoine Jérôme Balard, French chemist (d. 1876)
- October 31 – Benoît Fourneyron, French engineer (d. 1867)
- November 9 – Elijah P. Lovejoy, American abolitionist (d. 1837)
- November 19 – Solomon Foot, American politician (d. 1866)
- December 12 – Jakob Joseph Matthys, Swiss Catholic priest (d. 1866)
- December 15 – János Bolyai, Hungarian mathematician (d. 1860)
- December 23 – Sara Coleridge, British scholar (d. 1852)

=== Date unknown ===
- Friedrich Hohe, German lithographer, painter (d. 1870)
- Emma Fürstenhoff, Swedish florist (d. 1871)
- Mary Short, queen consort of Awadh (d. 1849)

== Deaths ==
=== January–June ===
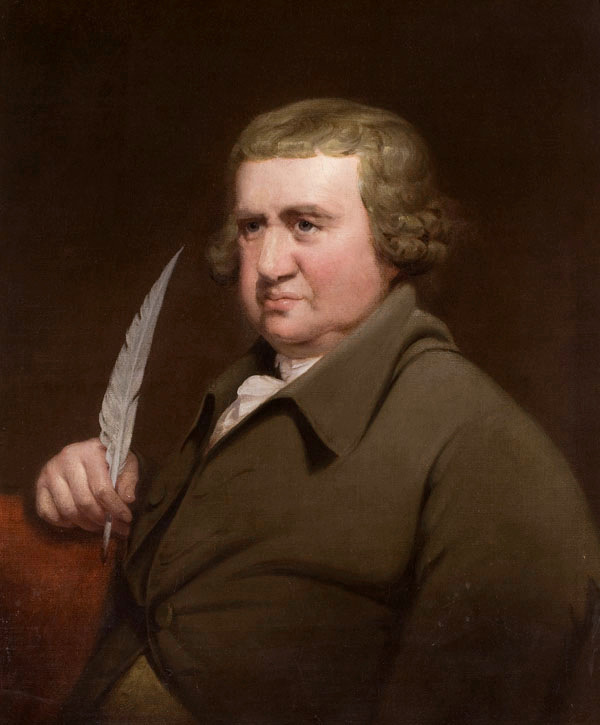
Erasmus Darwin

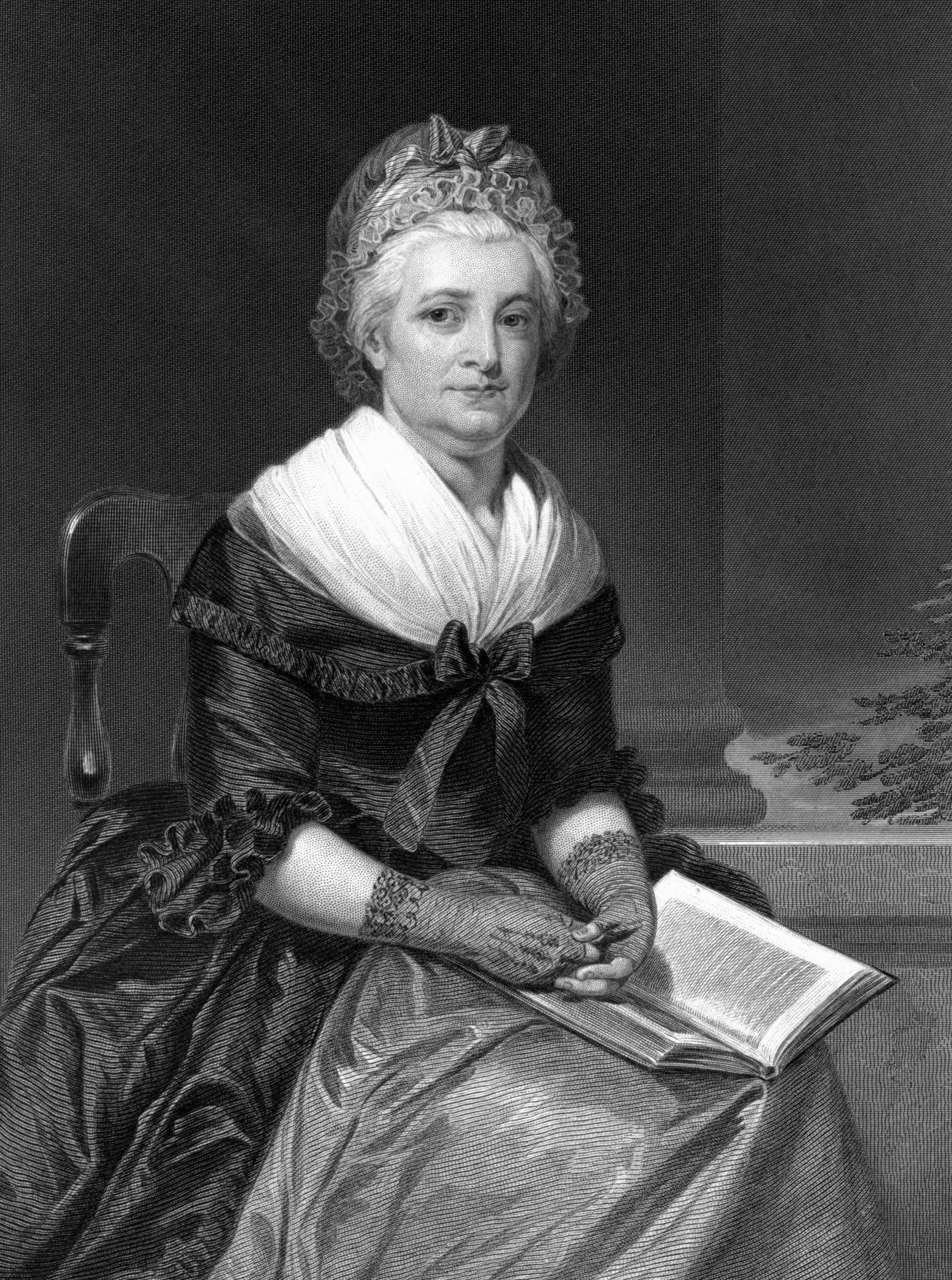
Martha Washington

- February 2 – Welbore Ellis, 1st Baron Mendip, British statesman (b. 1713)
- February 3 – Pedro Rodríguez, Count of Campomanes, Spanish statesman, writer (b. 1723)
- February 10 – Samuel Phillips, Jr., Massachusetts lieutenant governor (b. 1752)
- February 26 – Esek Hopkins, American Revolutionary War admiral (b. 1718)
- April 13 – Charles Moss, British bishop (b. 1711)
- April 18 – Erasmus Darwin, English physician and botanist (b. 1731)
- April 26 – Edmund Nelson (clergyman), English priest (b. 1722)
- May 9 – Erik Magnus Staël von Holstein, Swedish ambassador (b. 1749)
- May 22 – Martha Washington, first First Lady of the United States (b. 1731)

=== July–December ===
- July 6 – Daniel Morgan, American pioneer, Congressman from Virginia, and general (b. 1736)
- July 15 – John de Verdion, London-based bookseller and language instructor (b. 1740s)
- July 22 – Xavier Bichat, French anatomist and pathologist (b. 1771)
- July 24 – Joseph Ducreux, French noble, portrait painter, pastelist, miniaturist, and engraver (b. 1735)
- July 25 – Friedrich Karl Joseph von Erthal, Archbishop of Mainz (b. 1719)
- August 10 – Franz Aepinus, German philosopher (b. 1724)
- August 12 – Louis Lebègue Duportail French military leader in the Continental Army during the American Revolutionary War (b. 1743)
- September 19 – Princess Luisa of Naples and Sicily (b. 1773)
- September 26 – Jurij Vega, Slovenian mathematician, physicist, and soldier (b. 1754)
- October 5 – Suzanne Bélair, Haitian national heroine (b. 1781)
- October 8 – Emmanuele Vitale, Maltese military leader (b.1758)
- October 31 – Sir William Parker, 1st Baronet, of Harburn, British admiral (b. 1743)
- November 9 – Thomas Girtin, English artist (b. 1775)
- November 15 – George Romney, English artist (b. 1734)
- November 16 – André Michaux, French botanist (b. 1746)
- December 5 – Lemuel Francis Abbott, English portrait painter (b. 1716)
- December 31 – Francis Lewis, signer of the United States Declaration of Independence (b. 1713)
