= Ann Arbor (disambiguation) =

Ann Arbor is a city in Washtenaw County, Michigan, US.

Ann Arbor may also refer to:

- Ann Arbor station, an Amtrak station in Ann Arbor, Michigan
- Ann Arbor Charter Township, Michigan, a township adjacent to the city of Ann Arbor
- Ann Arbor Film Festival
- Ann Arbor Municipal Airport (IATA: ARB, ICAO: KARB)

== See also ==
- Ann Arbor staging, the staging system for lymphomas
- Anarbor, a pop-rock band on Hopeless Records
- AnnArbor.com, Ann Arbor's defunct local newspaper
- Ann Arbor Railroad (disambiguation) defunct lines in Ohio and Michigan
- Ann Arbor (automobile), a vehicle produced by Huron River Manufacturing Company (1911–12)
