= Aara =

Aara may refer to:

- Aara (actress)
- Aare, a river in Switzerland
- Ara (drink), a Bhutanese alcoholic beverage
- Urumi, a South Asian sword of flexible steel

== See also ==
- Aar (disambiguation)
- Aare (disambiguation)
