= AAR =

AAR or Aar may refer to:

== Aviation ==
- AAR Corporation, an American aviation engineering company
- Air-to-air refueling, the process of transferring aviation fuel from one military aircraft to another during flight
- Aarhus Airport in Mid Jutland Region, Denmark (IATA airport code AAR)
- Asiana Airlines of South Korea (ICAO airline code AAR)

== Places ==
- Aar, a river in Switzerland, tributary of the Rhine
- Aar (Lahn), a tributary of Lahn river in Germany, descending from the Taunus mountains
- Aar (Dill), a tributary of Dill river in Germany, also in the basin of the Lahn
- Aar (Ill), a branch of the Ill river that separates from it in Strasbourg, France and rejoins it further north
- Aar (Twiste), a tributary of Twiste river in Germany, in the basin of the Weser
- Aar (village), a village in Rajasthan, India
- South American–Antarctic Ridge, also known as the American–Antarctic Ridge, a mid-ocean ridge in the South Atlantic
- Antarctica, IAAF code AAR

== Military ==
- After-action review, a structured review process used by the U.S. military
- After action report, a retrospective analysis
- Assistant Automatic Rifleman, a soldier who carries ammunition; see Rifleman#Modern_tactics

== Organizations ==
- All American Racers, a former Formula 1 and CART team
- Allens (law firm), a law firm (formerly known as Allens Arthur Robinson)
- American Academy in Rome, research and arts institution in Rome
- American Academy of Religion, an association of academics who research or teach topics related to religion
- Association for Automated Reasoning, a non-profit that seeks to advance the field of automated reasoning
- Association of American Railroads, an industry trade group representing the railroads of North America

== Transportation ==
- AAR coupling, railway coupling specification of the Association of American Railroads
- AAR wheel arrangement, Association of American Railroads system for describing wheel arrangement of locomotives
- All-American Road, a designation for some national scenic byways in the US
- Ann Arbor Railroad (disambiguation)

== Other uses ==
- Aar (Star Wars), fictional planet in Star Wars universe
- Aar, a fictional planet of the star Deneb, in the "Captain Future" stories
- The All-American Rejects, an American rock band
- Air America Radio, a domestic US radio network
- Average accounting return, a capital budgeting investment rule
- Adam's apple reduction, a surgery
- Afar language (ISO 639 language identification code)
- African American Review, a journal
- Amino acid response, the biochemical response of a mammalian cell starved of amino acids
- "At any rate"; see List of SMS abbreviations
- Alkali–aggregate reaction, a chemical reaction leading to expansion in concrete

== See also ==
- Ahr, a river in Germany, tributary of the Rhine
- Aare (disambiguation)
