= Aare (disambiguation) =

The Aare is a tributary of the Rhine and the longest river in Switzerland.

Aare may also refer to:

- Aare (given name), Estonian masculine given name
- Aare (surname), Estonian surname

== See also ==
- AAR (disambiguation)
- Åre (disambiguation)
