= Siege of Strasbourg =

Siege during the Franco-German war in 1870

Coordinates: 48.5848°N 7.7506°E

- Part of the Franco-Prussian War
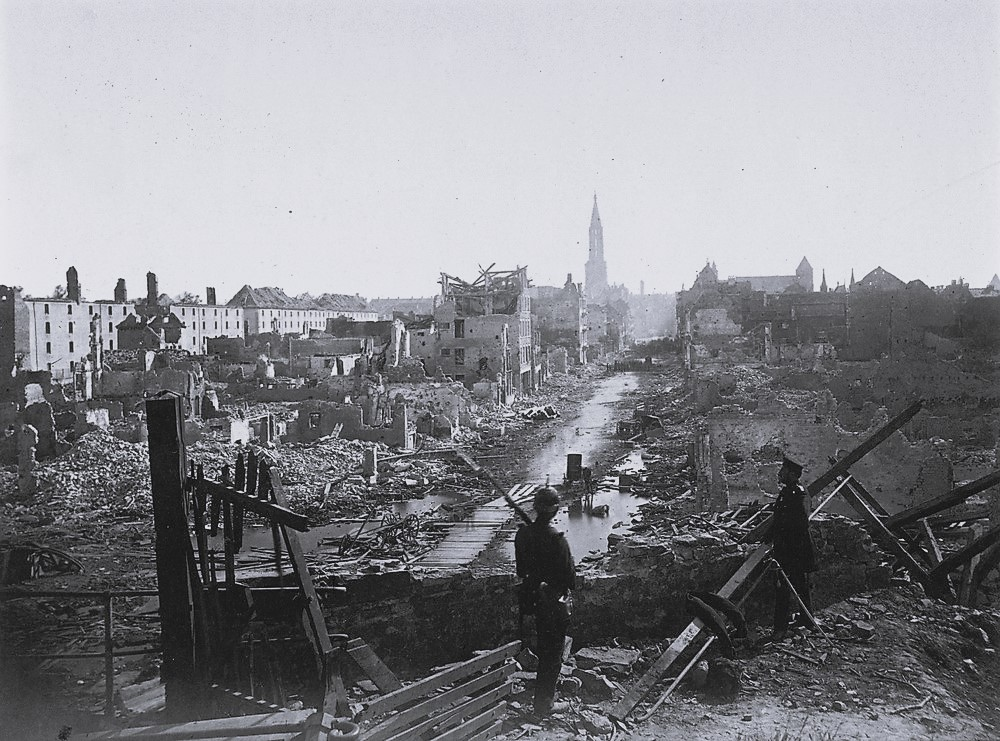
- Strasbourg in ruins after the siege
Date	14 August – 28 September 1870 (1 month and 2 weeks)
Location	Strasbourg, France
Result	German victory

Belligerents
North German Confederation: Prussia; Baden; Württemberg	(Second French Empire) French Empire (French Third Republic) French Republic

Commanders and leaders
(Kingdom of Prussia) August von Werder	Jean-Jacques Uhrich (surrendered)

Units involved
Siege Corps	Strasbourg fortress

Strength
40,000 men 366 guns and mortars	23,000 men 1,277 artillery pieces

Casualties and losses
936 177 killed and died of wounds 715 wounded 44 missing 78 horses	23,000 military Personnel; 861 dead Thousands wounded Thousands dispersed 17,562 captured Material; 1,277 artillery pieces 140,000 rifles 50 locomotives captured 448 houses destroyed Civilian; 341 killed 600–2,000 wounded 10,000 homeless

The siege of Strasbourg took place during the Franco-Prussian War, and resulted in the French surrender of the fortress on 28 September 1870.

After the German victory at Wörth, troops from the Grand Duchy of Baden under Prussian General August von Werder were detached to capture Strasbourg with the help of two Prussian Landwehr divisions which had been guarding the North Sea coast. This 40,000-strong siege corps reached the fortress on 14 August and began bombarding it. The defenses were largely obsolete and 7,000 of the 23,000-strong French garrison were National Guard militiamen. The German command was split between advocates of a formal siege and those who wanted to force a rapid capitulation by bombarding the city and weakening the resolve of the civilians. After the French bombardment of the open town of Kehl on 19 August had quelled possible German moral misgivings, the Germans gave a formal warning to the French garrison commander Lieutenant-General Jean-Jacques Uhrich and, despite continued doubts by some Germans about the plan's effectiveness, started bombarding Strasbourg on 23 August. Parts of the city were destroyed but there was no capitulation.

An ammunition shortage forced Werder to lower the intensity of the German fire on 26 August and switch to conventional siege operations. The Germans dug their way closer to the fortress through trench parallels and destroyed specific sections of the defenses with concentrated bombardments. The siege progressed rapidly, French sortie attempts were defeated and by 17 September the enceinte wall had been breached. At the same time, the defenders' morale was lowered by news of the annihilation of the Army of Châlons at Sedan and the encirclement of the Army of the Rhine in Metz.

On 19 September the Germans took an outwork and bombarded the ramparts. Uhrich surrendered the fortress, 17,562 troops, 1,277 artillery pieces, 140,000 rifles, including 12,000 Chassepots, 50 locomotives and stores of supplies into German hands on 28 September. The French National Guards were allowed to disperse. The Germans lost 936 troops. The besiegers expended 202,099 shells, with a weight of about 4,000 tons. Some 861 French soldiers died from all causes by the end of the siege and thousands were wounded. A total of 341 civilians were killed by the bombardment and a further 600–2,000 wounded. An estimated 448 houses were destroyed and 10,000 inhabitants were rendered homeless. The German siege operation was successful in clearing up railway lines to German forces in the French interior and freed up several divisions and a corps for operations along the Seine and in the siege of Paris. The French garrison were granted the honours of war but the intentional targeting of the civilian population presaged the wars of the 20th century.

== Background ==
After the Battle of Wörth, Crown Prince Frederick detached General August von Werder to move south against the fortress of Strasbourg. The city commanded a bridgehead across the Rhine, threatening southern Germany.

== Opposing forces ==
=== German ===
Werder's force was made up of 40,000 troops from Prussia, Württemberg and Baden, which lay just across the Rhine from Strasbourg. Werder's force eventually included the Landwehr Guard Division, the 1st Reserve Division, with one cavalry brigade, 46 battalions, 24 squadrons, 18 field batteries, a separate siege train of 200 field guns and 88 mortars, 6,000-foot artillerymen and ten companies of sappers and miners. The artillery parks at Vendenheim and Kork had a total of 366 guns and mortars, with 320,404 shells, case shot and shrapnel provided.

=== French ===
At the time, Strasbourg (along with Metz) was considered to be one of the strongest fortresses in France. Marshal Patrice de MacMahon evacuated Alsace after Wörth and left only three battalions of regulars to hold Strasbourg. Stragglers from Wörth, various other remnant forces, 130 marine infantrymen and elements of the Garde Mobile and National Guard militia improved the garrison's strength to 23,000. The fortress had at least 1,277 guns but no military engineers. The French commandant was the 68-year-old Lieutenant-General Jean-Jacques Uhrich.

== Siege ==
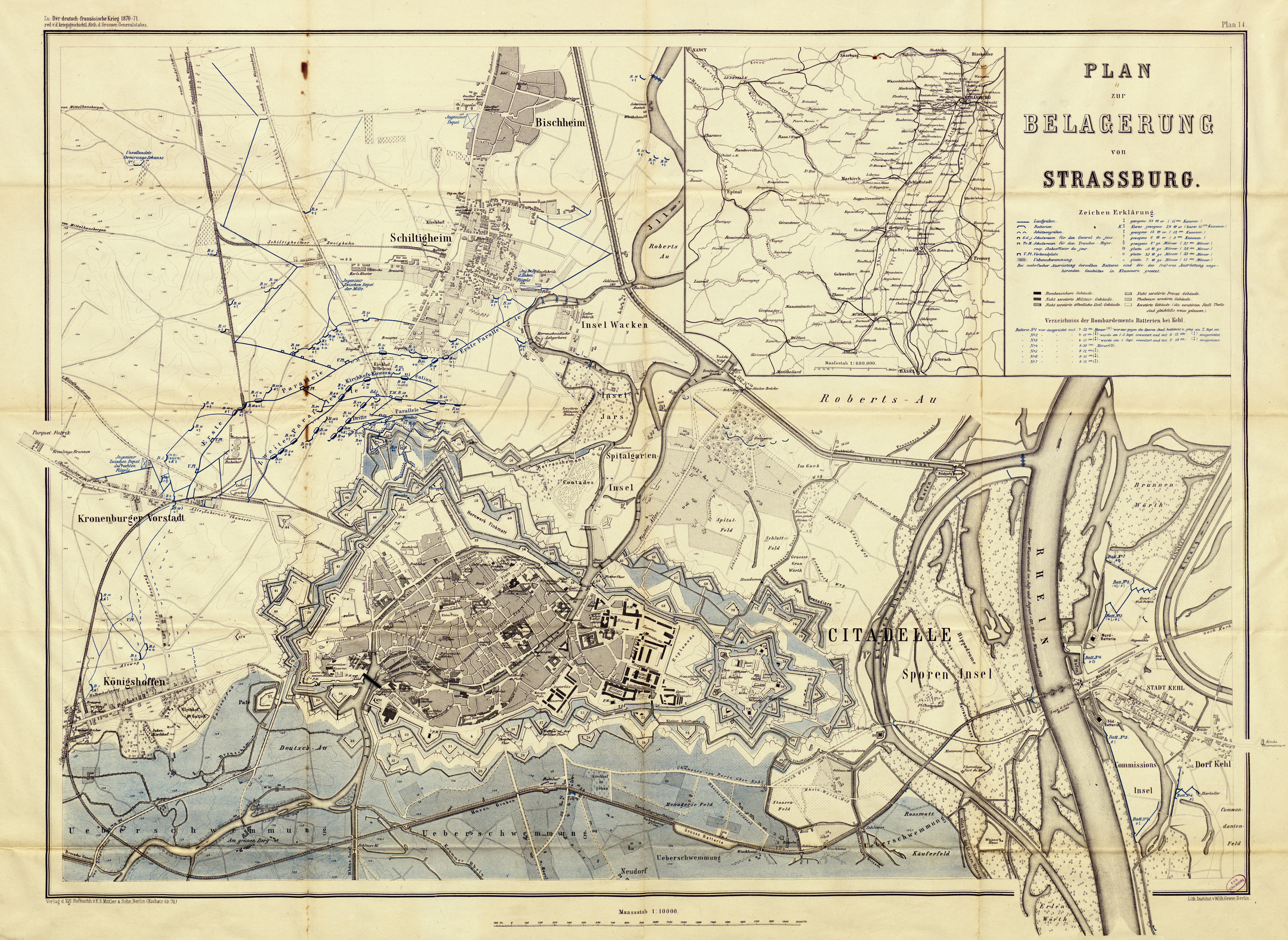
Detailed map of the siege

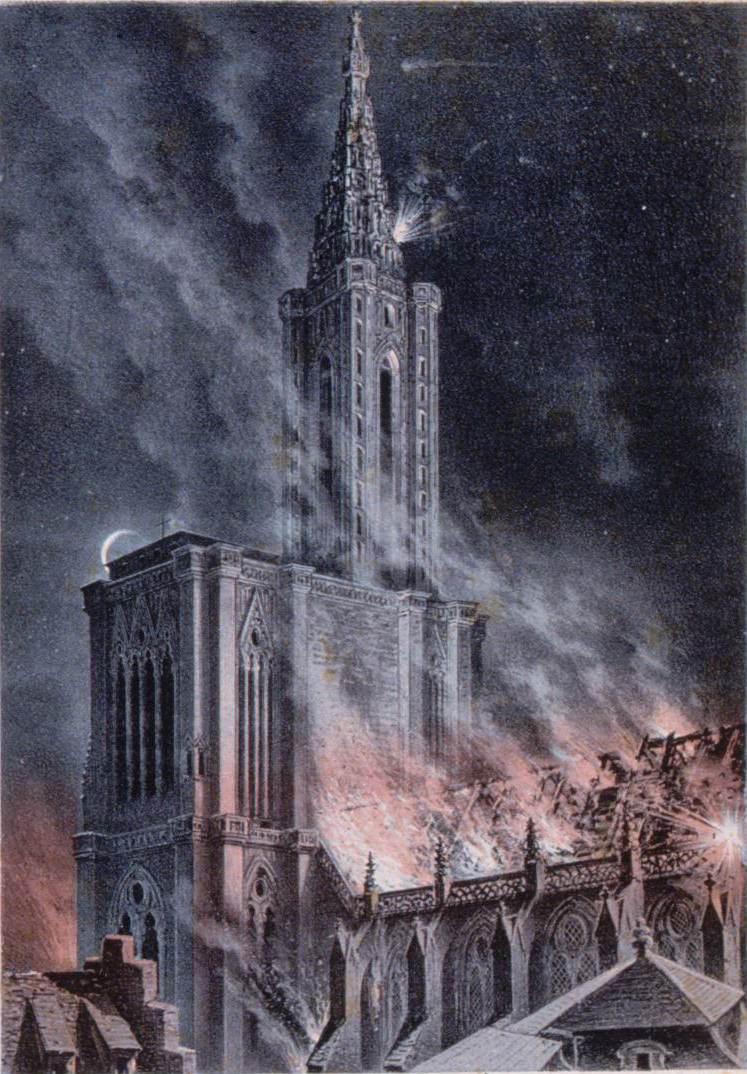
The bombardment of Strasbourg cathedral on the night of 24 August 1870.

On 11 August, Baden's force put Strasbourg under observation. They occupied the nearby town of Schiltigheim, fortified it, and captured the Strasbourg suburb of Königshofen. Werder understood the value of capturing the city, and ruled out a lengthy siege of starvation. He instead decided on a quicker action, bombarding the fortifications and the civilian population into submission. The first shells fell on the city on 14 August.

=== Initial bombardment ===
On 23 August Werder's siege guns opened fire on the city and caused considerable damage to the city and many of its historical landmarks. The Bishop of Strasbourg, Andreas Räss, went to Werder to beg for a ceasefire, and the civilian population suggested paying 100,000 francs to Werder each day he did not bomb the city. Uhrich refused to relent, and by 26 August Werder realized he could not keep up such a bombardment with the amount of ammunition he had. On 24 August, the Museum of Fine Arts was destroyed by fire, as was the Municipal Library housed in the Gothic former Dominican Church, with its unique collection of medieval manuscripts, rare Renaissance books and ancient Roman artifacts.

=== Formal attack ===
On 26 August, Werder decided to go ahead with formal siege operations against the fortress. On 27 August, he sent a report to royal headquarters on his intention to open the first parallel on the night of 29–30 August. The Germans had carried out preparations for the formal siege even as the bombardment proceeded. These included entrenching tool depots at Bischheim and Suffelweyersheim and the platforms, artillery parks and materiel of the siege artillery at Kork, Kehl, Neumühl and Vendenheim. By 24 August, the infantry had trained in the building of trenches by engineer officers. To reconnoiter the fortress more closely and cover the main approach, the German lines of outposts moved forward on 27 August after dark between Königshoffen and the Aar to within 300 meters of the glacis. There was no French resistance. On the morning of 28 August, the lines of outposts were withdrawn back to their previous positions after pioneers had constructed sufficient cover in the rain.

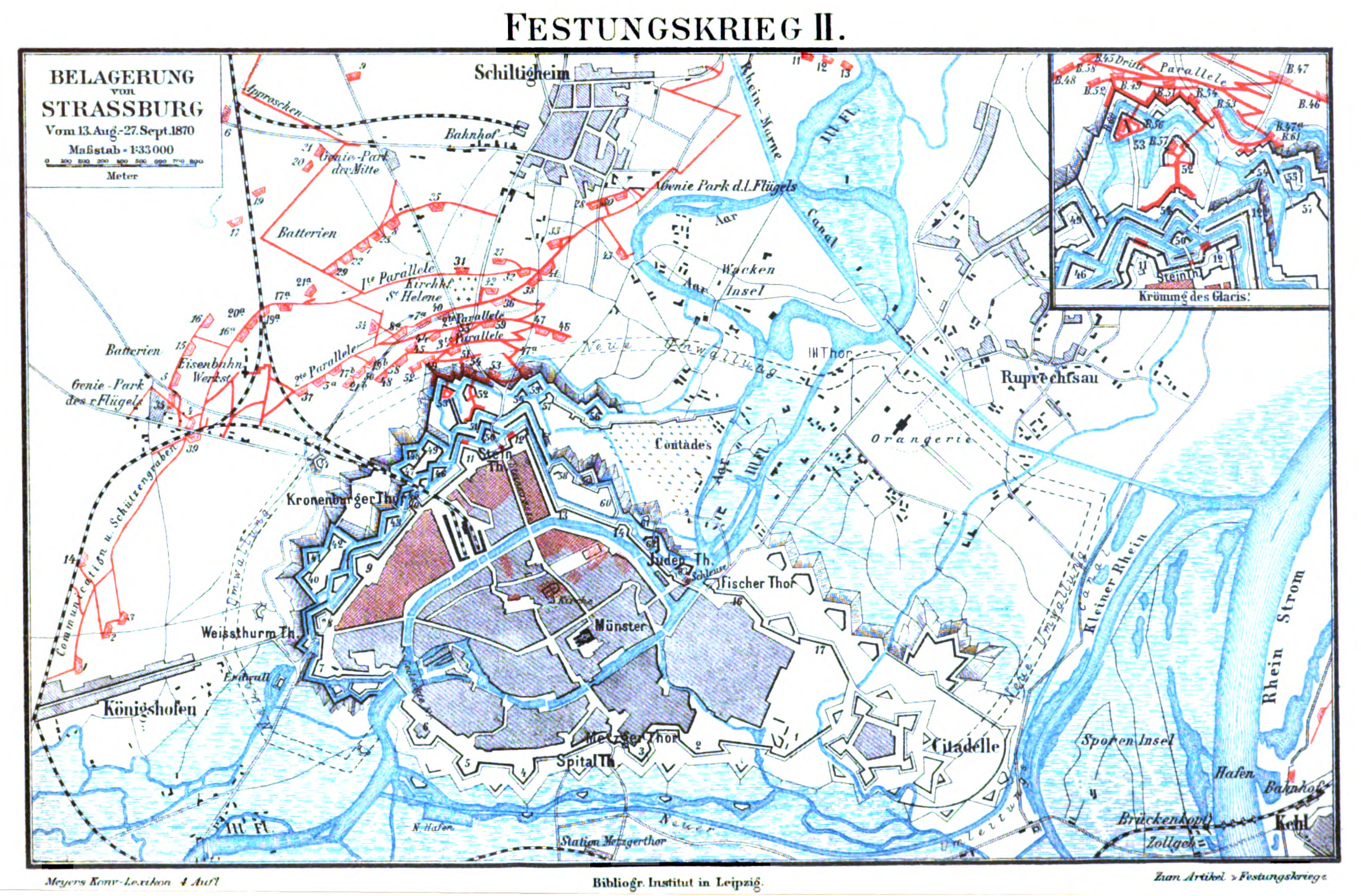
Map of the siege.

At 1000 on 28 August, the French garrison opened up with rifle and artillery fire. At 1200, two French companies sortied out from the covered way near the Stone Gate. A company of the Schneidemühl Landwehr battalion repulsed the attack with some support and skirmished with the French until dark. French wall pieces and infantry fired from the No. 44 lunette against the Prussian position at Kronenburg. A French detachment of several hundred men momentarily captured the outermost Prussian trenches but was then thrown back by the Prussian infantry's file-fire. Two Landwehr battalions from the Guard Landwehr Division occupied this line of trenches in the evening.

On the night of 28–29 August, the line of trenches was extended to cover the entire attack sector and communications were established along the line. Werder ordered the island of Wacken taken to cover the left flank. A company of the Konitz Landwehr Battalion crossed a pontoon bridge that had been erected by pioneers and threw out the French outposts on the island. A French company from Jars island attempted a counterattack on the morning of 29 August, but was defeated by the Landwehr company with the help of some troops of the Deutsch-Krone Landwehr Battalion. The Landwehr company sent some skirmishers to pursue the French to Jars island but these were withdrawn by 9 am back to Wacken.

Baden picket lines at Weghäusel, Meinau and Neuhof were thrown forward to Neudorf and the Schachen Mill. Detachment from Illkirch approached the glacis and skirmished with the French to distract the garrison of the real axis of attack. A detachment from Lingolsheim could not make it to the gorge of the Paté Lunette as the bridges had been destroyed. The French outwork maintained a continuous fire on the German siege batteries at Königshoffen and the outposts at Lingolsheim. French inhabitants attempting to escape Strasbourg to the south were sent back to the town by the Baden soldiers.

Werder continued bombing the city, this time targeting selected fortifications. The German siege lines moved rapidly closer to the city as each fortress was turned into rubble. On 11 September, a delegation of Swiss officials went into the city to evacuate non-combatants. This delegation brought in news of the defeat of the French at the Battle of Sedan, which meant no relief was coming to Strasbourg. On 19 September the remaining civilians urged Uhrich to surrender the city, but he refused, believing a defense was still possible. However, that same day Werder stormed and captured the first of the city's fortifications. This event caused Uhrich to reconsider his ability to defend the city. On 27 September Uhrich opened negotiations with Werder, and the city surrendered the following day.

== Aftermath ==
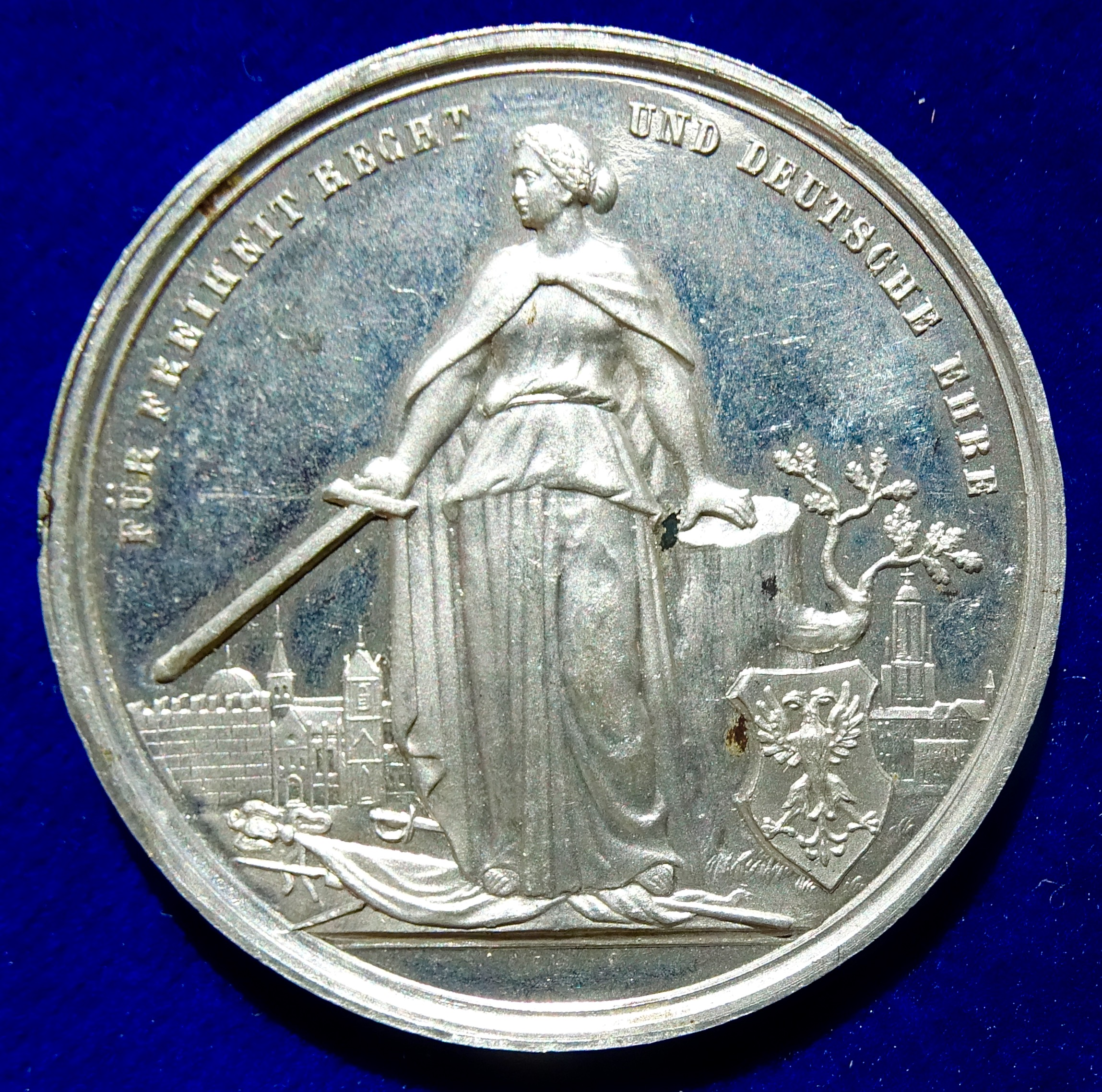
German Medal 1870 Siege of Strasbourg, Alsace, in the Franco-Prussian War (obverse). On French arms standing Germania l. holding a sword and a stump, the double headed Imperial Eagle on a shield at right. In the background a view of Strasbourg.

The capture of Strasbourg and the fall of Toul advanced the railway terminus from Germany to the siege lines of Paris considerably to the west. Werder's troops were freed for operations in the French interior against the newly-raised Republican armies.

The German siege artillery expended 202,099 shells before the city, some 4,000 tons of ammunition. Werder was promoted to General of the Infantry and his Siege Corps was formed into XIV Corps on 30 September. The Guard Landwehr division was sent to the siege of Paris by a railway line that had been opened by the fall of Toul. The 1st Reserve Division remained behind as Strasbourg garrison, the siege artillery was relocated to Vendenheim and the pioneers and fortress guns remained in the city and its vicinity in readiness for future deployments. The rest of XIV Corps, including the Baden Field Division, the 30th and 34th Prussian Regiments, two regiments of Reserve Light Cavalry and three batteries from the 1st Reserve Division, began their march toward Châtillon and Troyes.

Strasbourg was ceded to Germany in the Treaty of Frankfurt on 10 May 1871.

=== Analysis ===
The French commandant surrendered the fortress despite possessing plentiful stocks of food and ammunition. The French garrison did not possess sufficient aggressiveness to disrupt the German preparations and left the most probable avenue of attack unprepared. The fortress and the city lacked accommodations capable of withstanding the powerful German breech-loading guns and the French fortress artillery, despite its numerical superiority, was quickly silenced and reduced to simple harassment fire.

The Germans, in contrast, made thorough preparations for every eventuality. While the initial bombardment was underway, arrangements for a regular siege operation continued undisturbed. The German siege lines were pushed energetically every day and failings were constantly critiqued and quickly corrected.

=== Casualties ===
The French lost 17,562 troops, 1,277 artillery pieces, 140,000 rifles, including 12,000 Chassepots, 50 locomotives and their supplies captured. The French National Guards were dispersed. The Germans lost 936 officers and men, including 177 killed and died of wounds, 715 wounded and 44 missing. Horse losses were 78, of which 37 killed or died of wounds, 29 wounded and 12 missing. Some 861 French soldiers died from all causes by the end of the siege. The German General Staff estimated 2,500 French combatants killed or wounded. A total of 341 civilians were killed by the bombardment and a further 600–2,000 wounded. An estimated 448 houses were completely destroyed and 10,000 inhabitants, including refugees, were rendered homeless. The German government compensated three quarters of the costs of the siege and occupation to the city.
