= John de Verdion =

London-based bookseller and translator (died 1802)

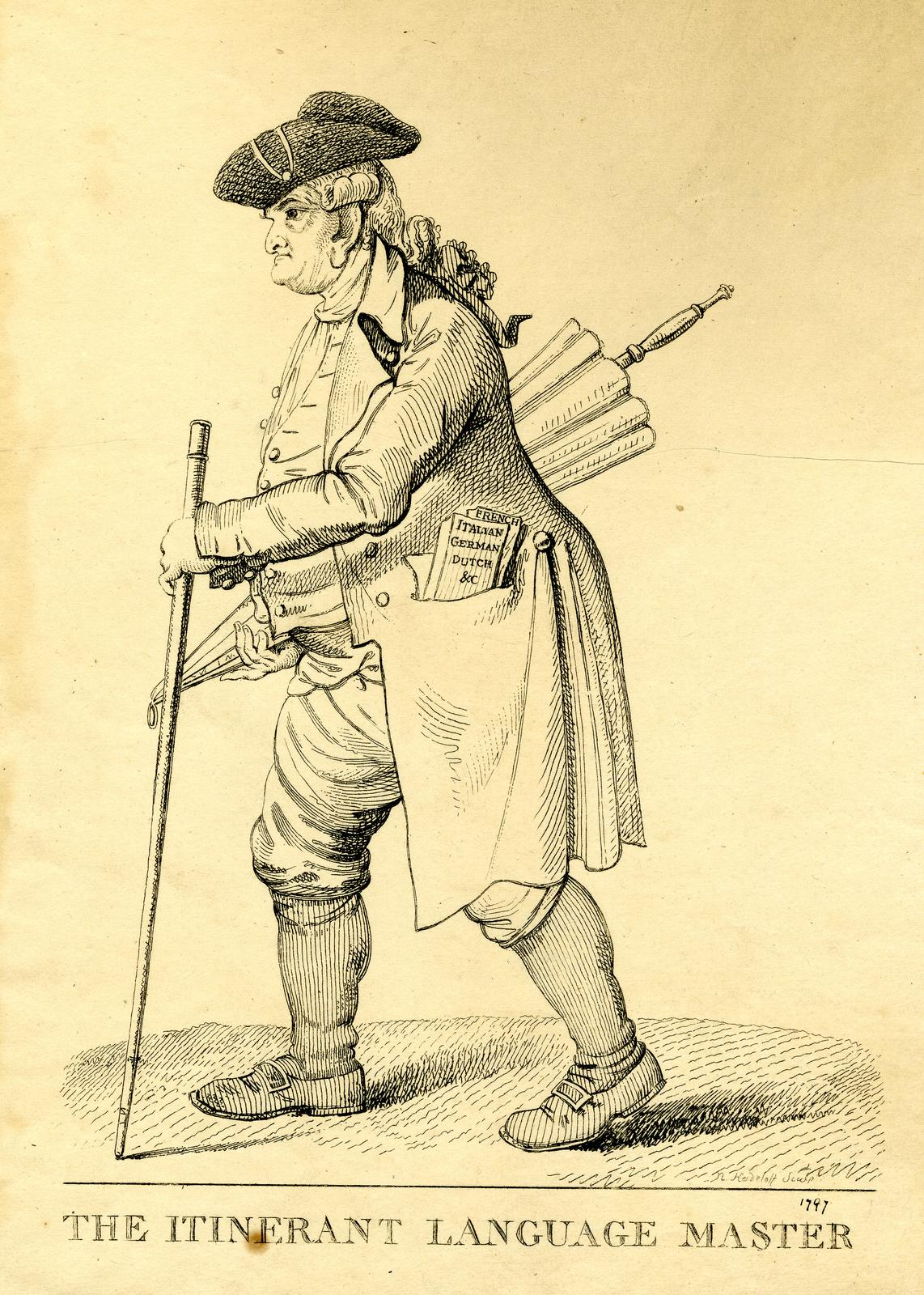
- A portrait of de Verdion from 1797
- Born: Theodora Grahn c. 1744; Leipzig, Electorate of Saxony
- Died: 15 July 1802 (aged 57–58); Holborn, London, England
- Other names: Theodora de Verdion; Chevalier John Theodora de Verdion
- Occupations: Bookseller, language teacher, translator

John de Verdion (born Theodora Grahn; c. 1744 – 15 July 1802) was a German-born bookseller, language instructor, and translator. Born the only child of an architect, he (Note: This article uses he/him pronouns for de Verdion. While de Verdion's gender identity is unknown, he presented himself as male for much of his life, his trade card listed him as "Mr de Verdion" and, in his will, referred to himself as John de Verdion.) worked as an exchange broker during the Seven Years' War and began presenting himself as a man in his 20s in Bayreuth, where he worked as a secretary for the educational reformer Johann Bernhard Basedow. Suspicions about his sex led to his dismissal from Basedow's employ and after an incident where his clothes were torn off by a group of men, he moved to London in 1770.

In London, he styled himself Dr John de Verdion and was employed as a translator and instructor of languages, having knowledge of German, French, and Italian. He cut a recognisable figure in public, always wearing a bag wig and a cocked hat and carrying an umbrella in all weathers. He purchased antiquarian books from auction houses and resold them. As a frequent patron of Furnival's Inn, he was known for his large appetite for food and drink.

Among his language students were Edward Gibbon, William Cavendish-Bentinck, 3rd Duke of Portland, and a Prussian ambassador. de Verdion was said to know Madame Schwellenberg and was admitted to the court of St James's Palace and the drawing room of Queen Charlotte, dressed in full costume, including an elegant sword.

Following a fall down the stairs, de Verdion died at his Hatton Garden home in July 1802.

== Early life ==
Theodora Grahn was born in the early 1740s (Note: Many sources list 1744 as the birth date of de Verdion though Kirby's Wonderful and Scientific Museum states that his father died in 1740.) in either Leipzig or Berlin, the only child of architect Johann Friedrich Grael and Loysa Sophia (née Kiesewetter). After the deaths of his parents, he moved to Berlin to live with his aunt. He learned mathematics, French, English and Italian.

=== Exchange broker ===
de Verdion's aunt died in 1758 and left him 1000 reichsthalers. Following her death, he started working as an exchange broker, a profitable profession during the Seven Years' War. He made daily outings to counting houses in various parts of the city and wore boots during the dirtier weather. By the conclusion of the war in 1763, he had doubled his money.

=== Work for Johann Bernhard Basedow ===
Around 1763, he moved to Bayreuth and by 1768 was living as a man, dressed as a huntsman and styling himself the Baron John de Verdion. (Note: Verdion was his grandmother's surname.) In 1769 he worked for German educational reformer Johann Bernhard Basedow as an amanuensis and secretary. It was suspected that de Verdion was not a man and rumours circulated about the nature of the relationship between the pair. Baselow himself was not convinced that de Verdion was a woman, but an ensuing scandal obliged him to dismiss de Verdion from his employ. In 1770, some young men from the counting house of a merchant concocted a plan to determine de Verdion's sex. They invited him to an inn and plied him with drinks. Once he was drunk, they assaulted him, tore off his clothes, and "verified her [sic] sex beyond all possibility of doubt".

== Life in London ==
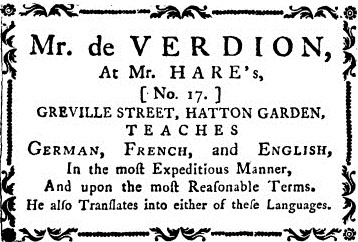
de Verdion's trade card

In 1770, he moved to London where he referred to himself as Dr John de Verdion. He translated, taught languages, and traded in books. A trade card of his, preserved in the British Library, lists his name as Mr de Verdion. de Verdion dealt in odd volumes and antiquary books. He would often purchase books at the auction house, sometimes by the coach load, and later resell the volumes to local bookstores. His advice was sought by book purchasers and he gained a reputation for having a good knowledge of English literature. He also collected foreign coins, made from silver and gold, as well as medals.

=== Appearance ===
de Verdion always dressed in men's clothing when seen in public. He wore a bag wig and a large cocked hat. He would carry a cane and always had an umbrella regardless of the weather. Books would be stuffed in the pockets of his coat. His singular appearance was well-remembered by Londoners and made him the "jest of the company".

=== Furnival's Inn ===
de Verdion was a regular patron at Furnival's Inn, where he dined almost daily and was known for his excessive drinking and sizeable meals. According to Kirby's Wonderful and Scientific Museum, he was known to drink two bottles of wine or eat three pounds of solid meat in a sitting. In a memorable instance, "A friend... was absolutely witness to her [sic] eating eighteen eggs, and a proportionate quantity of bacon, which were all broken into the frying pan at once."

de Verdion drew the attention of people who suspected that he was a woman and who wanted to scare him, and would rarely venture home unattended. After one evening of heavy drinking at the inn, de Verdion had to be escorted home by two other patrons, who intruded upon his room and undressed him to sate their curiosity. The following day, de Verdion returned to the inn to request to the master there that he should never be sent home in such a manner in the future. On another occasion, a number of gentlemen at Furnival's Inn insisted that he was disguised as a man and that they would leave the premises if he was not removed from the room. Upon being informed of the situation, de Verdion called them "rogues". In yet another instance, he was accosted by a group of young men who insisted that de Verdion had picked one of their pockets.

=== Students and patrons ===
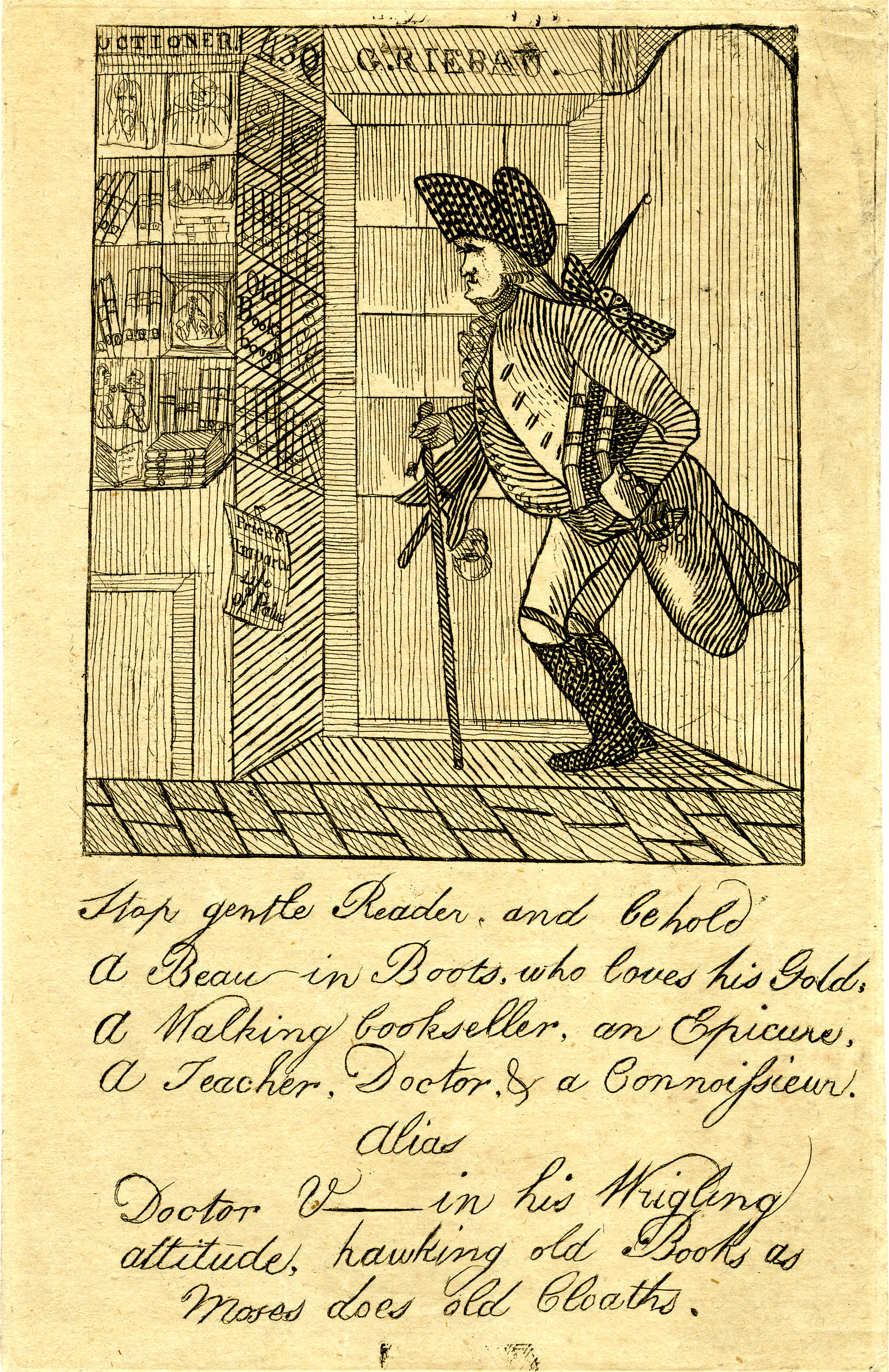
An etching of de Verdion

de Verdion taught languages to various prominent men. He taught German to Edward Gibbon, who went on to author The History of the Decline and Fall of the Roman Empire. He also taught English to the Prussian ambassador and German to William Cavendish-Bentinck, 3rd Duke of Portland. de Verdion was an admirer of John Wesley.

de Verdion also made the acquaintance of Madame Schwellenberg, a bedchamber woman of the British queen Charlotte of Mecklenburg-Strelitz. Schwellenberg was said to be his patron, and due possibly to his knowing her, he was admitted to the court of St James's Palace and attended the queen's drawing room in full court costume, along with an elegant sword.

== Death and will ==
In 1802, de Verdion was hurt in a fall down the stairs and injured his breast. Eventually, he was tended to by his German neighbour who was a physician but his condition worsened and he acquired dropsy. He died of a "cancer in the breast" on 15 July 1802, at his home on Upper Charles-street, Hatton Garden. He was interred at St Andrew Holborn, in Gray's-inn-lane. His coffin plate was engraved "John de Verdion" before being changed to "Miss de Verdion".

In his will, which he drew up on 8 June 1802, he referred to himself as "John de Verdion otherwise Theodoria [sic] de Verdion, Master of Languages of Upper Charles Street Hatton Garden". Terrified at the thought of being buried alive, he included instructions that his body be left to rest for eight days before being buried. The sole beneficiary of the will was Mr Denner, the owner of the coffee house at Furnival's Inn, who he owed £40. The gold and silver coins that de Verdion was supposed to possess and his sword were not found among his belongings. The sum of de Verdion's possessions was his wardrobe and was insufficient to cover his debt.

== Biographical accounts ==
Following his death, de Verdion was written up as a curiosity and accounts of his life appeared in books about unusual people and events. These accounts invariably referred to de Verdion as a woman disguised as a man. Among the first biographical treatments published following his death was in the 1804 book Kirby's Wonderful and Scientific Museum. Later works, such as the 1852 book The Lives and Portraits of Curious and Odd Characters, said that he was known as Chevalier John Theodora de Verdion. de Verdion was characterised as an eccentric and his appearance was described as "extremely grotesque".

More recent accounts of de Verdion's life in the gender studies field have sometimes labelled him a transsexual. It is unknown whether he identified as a man or whether his life as a man was adopted as a strategy for a world that provided women with few opportunities.

== See also ==
- Chevalier d'Éon
