= Toivo Aare =

Estonian journalist (1944–1999)

Toivo Aare (20 April 1944 Nõva, Harju County – 9 April 1999 Tallinn) was an Estonian journalist.

He studied at what is now Tallinn Adult Gymnasium. In 1970 he graduated from Tartu State University in Estonian language and literature with a specialization in journalism. His diploma work dealt with aspects of foreign radio propaganda theory. After graduating, he continued in postgraduate studies for three years.

Aare began working in Eesti Raadio during his student years, producing programmes for youth and children. From 1975 he worked at the newspaper Noorte Hääl, first as a correspondent and then as deputy editor. Between 1982 and 1989, he served as the paper’s editor-in-chief during a politically sensitive period in Estonia.

During the late 1980s environmental movement known as the Fosforiidisõda (Phosphorite War), Aare took editorial responsibility for controversial pieces by colleague Juhan Aare.

In the 1990s, he returned to radio and held roles including programme director and commentator at Eesti Raadio. He also worked briefly in local radio and at Raadio 2. Later he became editor-in-chief of the Estonian News Agency (ETA) and led the newspaper Esmaspäev. He acted as press secretary for the Estonian Coalition Party and was a correspondent for the Videvik newspaper.

Aare died by suicide in 1999, no farewell letter was found.

In his personal life, he had two children, Indrek and Katrin, from his first marriage to Ellen Aare-Põder.

== Works ==
- For us, for us (Tallinn, 1978)
- Five Years (Tallinn, 1978)
