= Aare (given name) =

Estonian-language masculine given name

- Gender: Male
- Language: Estonian
- Name day: 12 October

Origin
- Meaning: Treasure
- Region of origin: Estonia

Aare is an Estonian masculine given name meaning "treasure" in the Estonian language.

People named Aare include:

- Aare Heinvee (born 1956), politician
- Aare Laanemets (1954–2000), actor and stage director
- Aare Laht (born 1948), chemist
- Aare Leikola (1893–1973), Finnish engineer, business executive and politician
- Aare-Paul Lattik (born 1970), organist and musical pedagogue
- Aare Mäemets (1929–2002), biologist and ecologist
- Aare Pilv (born 1976), poet
- Aare Tammesalu (born 1960), cellist
