= Aare (surname) =

Estonian family name

Aare is an Estonian surname meaning "treasure". Notable people with the surname include:

- Juhan Aare (1948–2021), Estonian journalist and politician
- Toivo Aare (1944–1999), Estonian journalist
- Tõnu Aare (1953–2021), Estonian singer and guitarist (of the band "Apelsin")
