= Aar, Udaipur =

Aar
- Village
- Location in Rajasthan, India Aar (India)
- Coordinates: 23.9653°N 74.3927°E
- Country: India
- State: Rajasthan
- District: Udaipur

Area
  - Total: 4.5547 km^{2} (1.7586 sq mi)

Population (2011)
  - Total: 1,007
  - Density: 221.1/km^{2} (572.6/sq mi)

Languages
  - Official: Hindi, Mewari
- Time zone: UTC+5:30 (IST)
- PIN: 313611
- Vehicle registration: RJ-
- Nearest city: Udaipur
- Lok Sabha constituency: Udaipur

Aar is a village located in Girwa Tehsil of Udaipur district in the Indian state of Rajasthan. As per the Population Census 2011, Aachhat village has a population of 1007 of which 513 are males while 494 are females.
