= Jean-Jacques Uhrich =

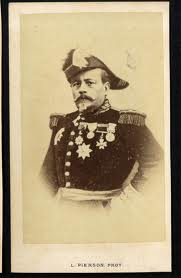
- Born: 15 February 1802; Phalsbourg, France
- Died: 9 October 1886 (aged 84); Paris, France
- Burial place: Père-Lachaise Cemetery; Paris, France
- Relatives: Maurice Gamelin (grand-nephew)
- Military career
- Allegiance: France
- Branch: French Army
- Service years: 1820–1867, 1870
- Rank: Général de division
- Conflicts: Second Italian War of Independence; Franco-Prussian War: Siege of Strasbourg
- Awards: Grand Cross of the Legion of Honor

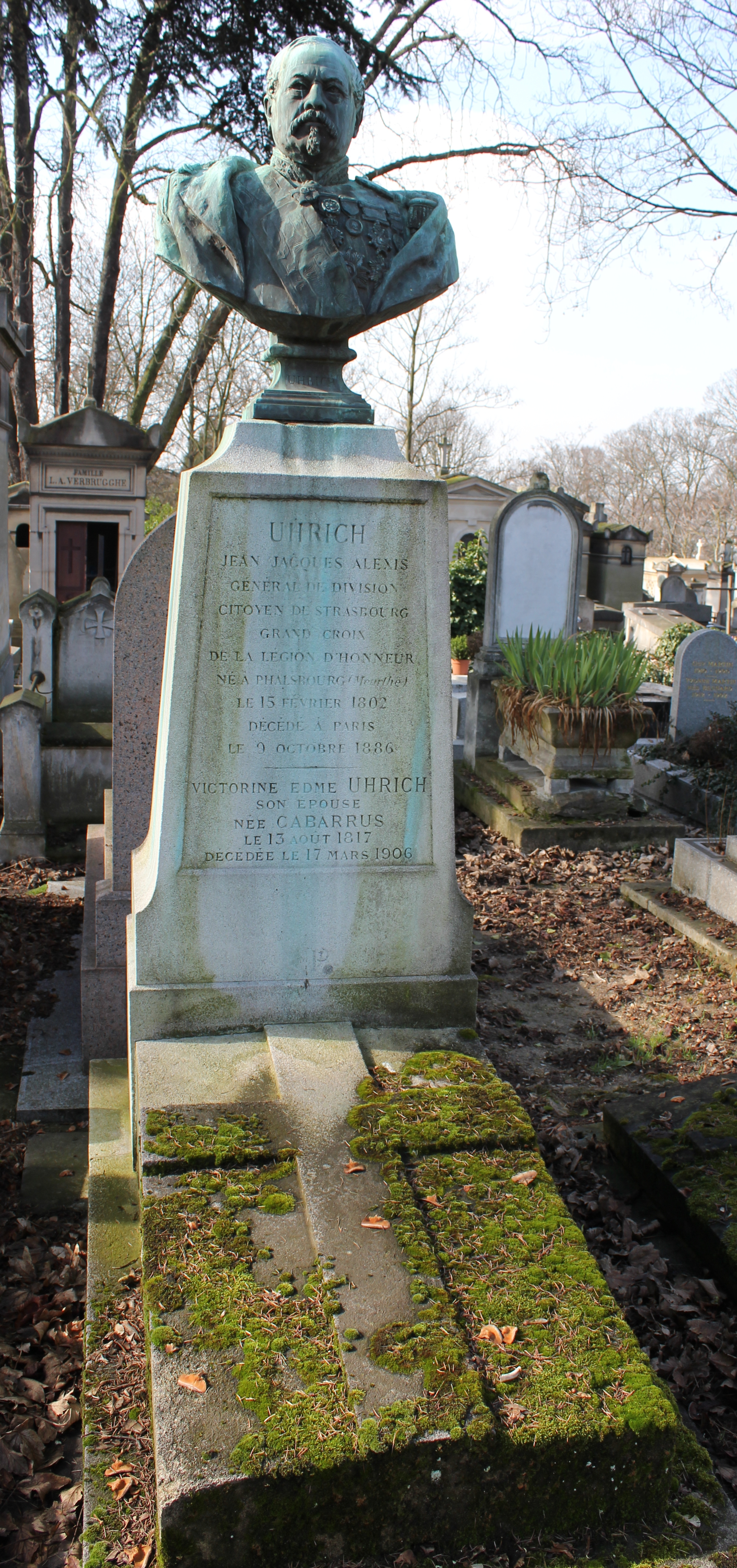
The tomb of Jean-Jacques Uhrich at the Père-Lachaise Cemetery in Paris with a bust by Augustin Courtet.

Jean-Jacques Alexis Uhrich, (born 15 February 1802 in Phalsbourg, Moselle, France, died 9 October 1886 in Paris) was a French général de division (divisional general). He was the great uncle of Général d'armée Maurice Gamelin (1872–1958). Military governor of the city of Strasbourg in 1870, Uhrich is best known for his service during the Franco-Prussian War (1870–1871) as the commander of French forces during the Siege of Strasbourg and for surrendering the city to German forces.

== Biography ==
=== 1818–1867 ===
Jean-Jacques Uhrich attended the French military academy at Saint-Cyr from 1818 to 1820, and was a member of Saint-Cyr's first graduating class since the Bourbon Restoration. (Note: This first graduating class from Saint-Cyr after the Bourbon Restoration was presented to King Louis XVIII in Saint-Cloud on 8 August 1819. On that occasion, the king said to the Saint-Cyrians presented to him, "My children, I am very happy with you, there is not one in your ranks who does not carry in his pouch the baton of the Marshal of France of the Duke of Reggio...it's up to you to get it out." Quoted in "La Saint-Cyrienne" (in French).) Other notable members of his graduating class included Roch Pâris de Bollardière (1803–1866), great-grandfather of Général de brigade Jacques Pâris de Bollardière (1907–1986); the journalist and writer Armand Carrel (1800–1836), who died in a duel; and the général de division and politician Prudent de Chasseloup-Laubat (1802–1863). Uhrich later graduated from the French Army′s Infantry School.

Uhrich′s first assignment was to the French Army′s 3rd Light Infantry Regiment with the rank of sous-lieutenant. He was promoted to capitaine in 1834, and in 1848 became colonel of the 3rd Light Infantry Regiment. He was promoted to général de brigade in 1852, and in 1855, during the second year of the Crimean War, he was promoted to général de division. He commanded a division of the French 5th Army Corps during the Second Italian War of Independence in 1859. He also served a tour as the commander of one of the territorial subdivisions of the Army of Nancy. He subsequently retired from active service in 1867 with the rank of général de division and was transferred to the reserve list.

=== Siege of Strasbourg ===
When the Franco-Prussian War broke out in 1870, Uhrich was recalled to active service. He replaced Général de division Auguste-Alexandre Ducrot as commanding officer of the 6th Military Division and at his own request became military governor of Strasbourg. Immediately after their victory in the Battle of Wörth (also known as he Battle of Reichshoffen and the Battle of Frœschwiller) on 6 August 1870, forces of the German states began to arrive at Strasbourg and initiated a siege of the city on 13 August with a force that soon reached a strength of 40,000. The German forces — consisting of elements of the Prussian Army and of the army of the Grand Duchy of Baden — began a desultory artillery bombardment of the city and its fortifications — designed by Sébastien Le Prestre de Vauban during the seventeenth century and obsolete by 1870 — on 14 August while the German commander, Prussian Generalmajor August von Werder, considered ways to bring the siege to a quick end. Werder informed Uhrich that his forces would begin an intensive bombardment of the city if it did not surrender, and, after Uhrich refused, the bombardment began on 23 August.

Four nights of heavy bombardment ensued, during which the municipal government asked Uhrich to propose to Werder that the city pay a ransom of 100,000 francs per day that the Germans did not bombard it, but Uhrich refused the request. On 26 August 1870, Werder — who unbeknownst to Uhrich was running too low on ammunition to continue the bombardment at a high level of intensity — offered a ceasefire if the city would surrender, but Uhrich refused this as well. Projecting steadiness and military professionalism, Uhrich rallied civilian opinion in Strasbourg in favor of continued resistance, and the determination of Strasbourg′s population to carry on stiffened military opinion against a proposed German bombardment of Paris. After the fourth night of heavy bombardment on 27 August, Werder reduced the level of bombardment to harassing fire and settled in for a long siege.

On 11 September 1870, the French in Strasbourg received news from a Swiss delegation the Germans had allowed into the city that the French Army′s Army of the Rhine had suffered a major defeat in the Battle of Gravelotte on 18 August 1870 and subsequently become besieged at Metz and that the Army of Châlons had been encircled and destroyed in the Battle of Sedan on 1–2 September. The twin calamities meant that no French force would arrive to relieve Strasbourg. On 17 September, the Germans succeeded in making their first breach in the city′s fortifications. The municipal government asked Uhrich to surrender the city on 19 September, but he refused. That day, however, the Germans penetrated further into the defenses, and on 27 September Uhrich's subordinates advised him that further defense of the city was impractical. On 28 September, Uhrich — expecting a final German infantry assault to take the city to begin the following day — asked Werder for terms of surrender. Uhrich and Werder negotiated politely and treated one another chivalrously, and Werder allowed the defenders of Strasbourg to march out of the city with full battle honors, although Uhrich's angry and humiliated troops left the city in a drunken and undisciplined manner. Uhrich was paroled and left Strasbourg, traveling first to Tours and then to Switzerland, where he lived in self-imposed exile.

During the Siege of Strasbourg, nearly 200,000 German artillery shells had landed in the city, doing extensive damage and leveling entire neighborhoods, leaving 10,000 people homeless. Despite this, Uhrich had held out for 46 days with a force of 10,000 men against a besieging force that reached a strength of 60,000. Uhrich nonetheless received strong criticism in France for the capitulation of Strasbourg. Many people in France viewed him as having behaved too courteously toward the enemy, claimed he had surrendered Strasbourg prematurely, and even accused him of committing an act tantamount to treason by surrendering the city.

Uhrich was general councilor of the Canton of Phalsbourg until 1871. He died on 9 October 1886 and is buried in Paris in the Père Lachaise Cemetery.

== Descendants ==
Uhrich's niece Pauline, daughter of his brother Gustave, intendant general of the army, married Auguste Gamelin (1837–1921), father of Général d'armée Maurice Gamelin (1872–1958), who during World War II commanded the French Army during both the Phony War period of 1939–1940 and the subsequent Battle of France in 1940.

== Awards and honors ==
- Commander of the Legion of Honor (1857)
- Grand Cross of the Legion of Honor (1862)
- Companion of the Order of the Bath (United Kingdom)

== Tributes ==
In Paris, by a decision of 12 September 1870 under the leadership of Étienne Arago, then mayor of Paris, the Avenue de l'Impératrice was renamed Avenue du Général-Uhrich in Uhrich′s honor. However, because of the widespread blame placed on Uhrich for the capitulation of Strasbourg, the street was renamed Avenue du Bois-de-Boulogne in 1875. In 1929, it was renamed Avenue Foch.

In Nantes, the Quai de la Bourse was renamed Quai Uhrich on 4 October 1870. It still bore the name Quai Uhrich in 1906, but has since regained the name Quai de la Bourse.

In Illkirch-Graffenstaden, one of the forts in Strasbourg's fortified square was named after Uhrich in 1918.
