= Joseph Bonnell =

American soldier (1802–1840)

- Born: August 4, 1802; Philadelphia, Pennsylvania, U.S.
- Died: September 27, 1840 (aged 38); Philadelphia, Pennsylvania, U.S.
- Burial place: Laurel Hill Cemetery, Philadelphia, Pennsylvania, U.S.
- Military career
- Allegiance: United States
- Branch: US Army; Texian Army
- Service years: 1825–1840
- Rank: Captain
- Units: 3rd US Infantry Regiment, 8th US Infantry Regiment

Joseph Bonnell (August 4, 1802 – September 27, 1840) was a formally recognized hero of the Texas Revolution. He was a West Point graduate (Class of 1825) and a member of The Long Gray Line (a phrase used to describe all graduates and cadets of the United States Military Academy at West Point, New York).

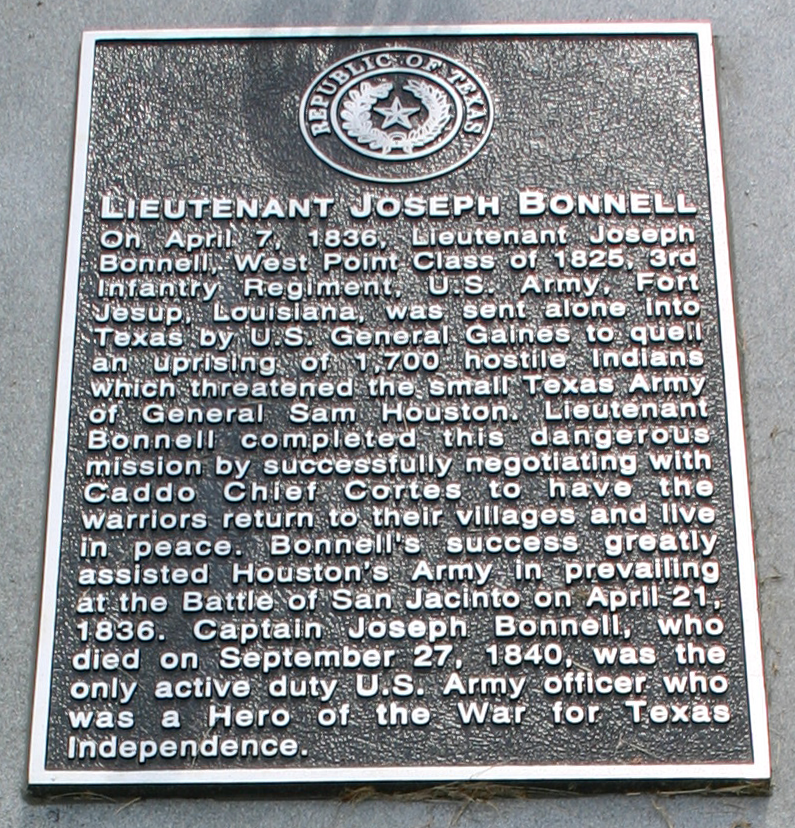
Joseph Bonnell Marker

== Formal recognition by Texas Legislature ==
His heroism in support of the War for Texas Independence is acknowledged in Texas House of Representatives Resolution #615 "Paying tribute to the life of Lieutenant Joseph Bonnell, hero of the Texas Revolution, and commemorating the placement of a historical marker at his grave site", which was adopted on 3/17/2005 by the 79th Texas Legislature. The resolution reads in part: "...he successfully quelled an uprising...through a peaceful negotiation with Caddo Chief Cortes; his efforts helped enable General Sam Houston to focus the full strength of his army on defeating Mexican troops led by Antonio Lopez de Santa Anna at the famed Battle of San Jacinto, effectively securing the independence of the Republic of Texas."

== 1835 Caddo Indian Treaty ==
Joseph Bonnell, first lieutenant, 3rd Infantry Regiment, US Army, Fort Jesup, Louisiana, was an official witness to the US and Caddo Indian Treaty of July 1, 1835, in which the Caddo Indians sold all of their lands in the United States to the United States. Lieutenant Bonnell asked to read the treaty before the chiefs signed and was refused by the US Agent. After the signing, it was discovered that the US Agent had included a hidden provision by which associates of the US Agent were enriched. Lieutenant Bonnell gave a deposition for the benefit of the Caddos which ultimately reached the US Supreme Court in US v. Brooks, 51 US 445 (1850).

== 1835-1836 appointment and commission in Texas Army ==
Bonnell's integrity and character came to the attention of Major General Sam Houston of the Texas Army who asked Bonnell to be his Aide-de-Camp, an appointment approved by the government of Texas. Bonnell performed the duties of Aide by providing General Houston with a comprehensive report on how to organize and establish an army. General Houston recommended that Bonnell be commissioned as a Captain in the Regular Army of Texas, and this was done by the government of Texas.

== Situation in March/April 1836 ==
In March and April 1836, during the “Runaway Scrape,” there were many reports of as many as 1,700 hostile Indians massing in East Texas. This threatened the security of General Houston's Army and the settlers in Texas. On April 7, 1836, US Major General Edmund P. Gaines, then commander of the southwest military division of the United States at Fort Jesup, Louisiana, ordered Bonnell to go into East Texas by himself to quell the Indian uprising.

== One tribal uprising - one infantry lieutenant ==
Bonnell found the Indian villages empty except for women and children, the warriors having gone to the field. He finally located Caddo Chief Cortes and negotiated with him to have the warriors return to the villages in peace. Bonnell successfully completed his dangerous mission, which was of great benefit to General Houston and the Texas Army by allowing General Sam Houston to focus the full strength of his army on defeating Mexican troops led by Antonio Lopez de Santa Anna at the famed Battle of San Jacinto. Bonnell returned to Fort Jesup and wrote his report on April 20, 1836, the day before the Battle of San Jacinto.

== Bonnell, Houston, and West Point graduates ==
The sword carried by General Houston in the Battle of San Jacinto was given to him by his friend, Joseph Bonnell. Bonnell had been in West Point with Texas Army Lieutenant William S. Stilwell who was with the “Twin Sisters” artillery at the Battle of San Jacinto. Bonnell was also at West Point with Albert Sidney Johnston, who later became Commanding General of the Texas Army and Secretary of War of the Republic of Texas when the new capital was built in Austin. In August 1836, three months after the Battle of San Jacinto, Sam Houston, Joseph Bonnell, and Albert Sidney Johnston were all in Nacogdoches, Texas.

== 1840 - end of life ==
Captain Joseph Bonnell, US Army, died on September 27, 1840, at the home of his brother in Philadelphia, Pennsylvania. He was interred at Laurel Hill Cemetery.

== Addendum ==
It was Bonnell who discovered the plot of Manuel Flores to incite the tribes to war against Texas.

== Images ==
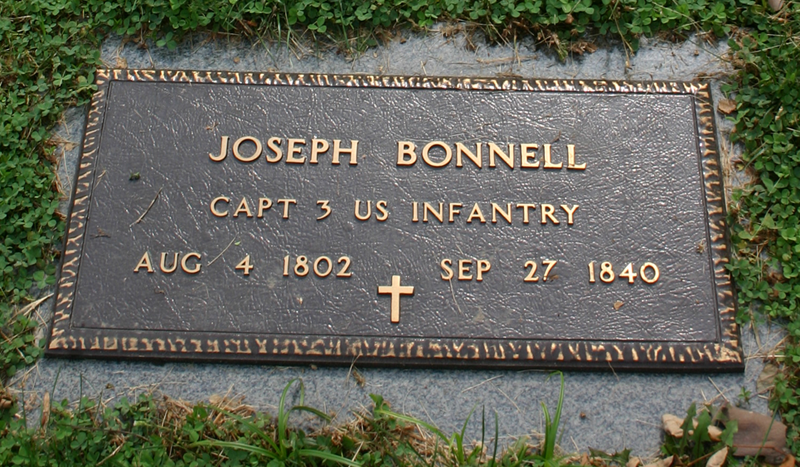
Cemetery Marker at Joseph Bonnell's Grave.

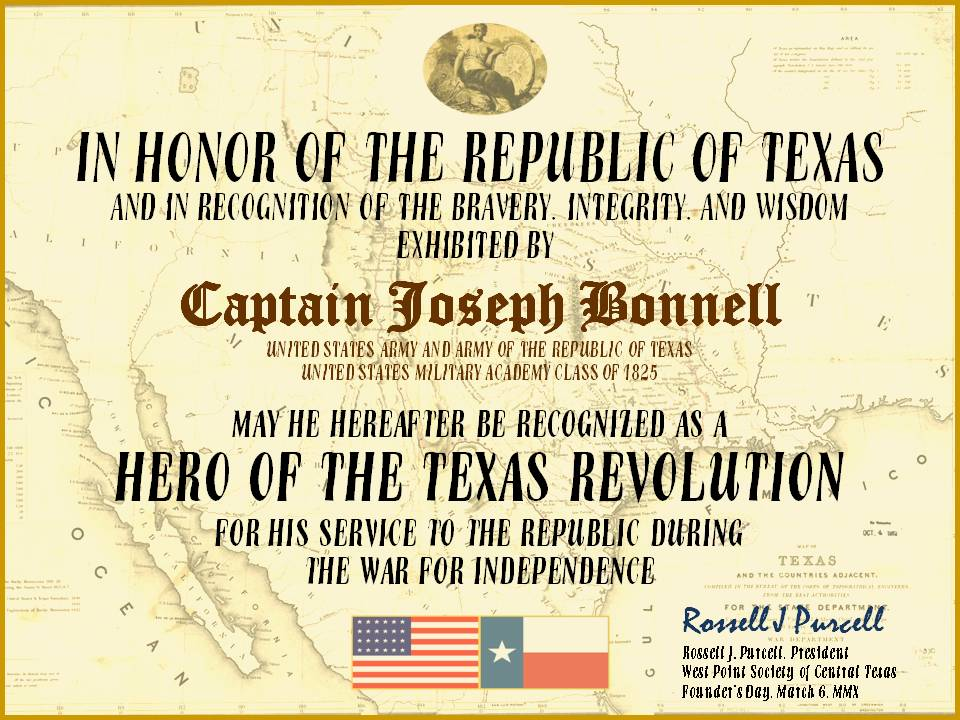
Joseph Bonnell Certificate

== Sources ==
- https://web.archive.org/web/20110614015325/http://www.west-point.org/joseph_bonnell/mt-bonnell_narrative_history
- https://www.youtube.com/watch?v=tRNTiKzYpq8&feature=sub
- http://www.west-point.org/joseph_bonnell/
- http://www.tshaonline.org/handbook/online/articles/fboat
- http://www.capitol.state.tx.us/tlodocs/79R/billtext/pdf/HR00615I.pdf
- http://www.kbsb.com/lydia_joseph_bonnell/Bnl_4151_a.jpg
- http://www.capitol.state.tx.us/BillLookup/History.aspx?LegSess=79R&Bill=HR615
- http://www.hmdb.org/Marker.asp?Marker=29786
