= Friedrich Hohe =

German lithographer and painter

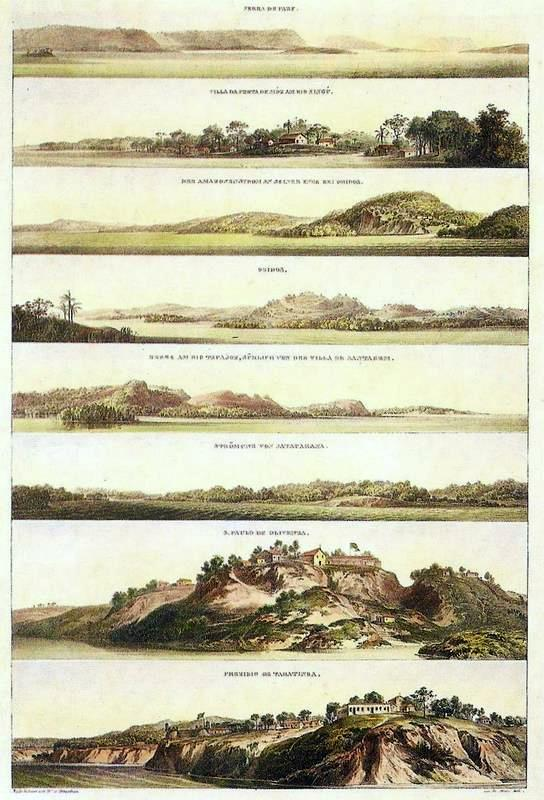
- Hohe's Ansichten am Amazonenstrome (Views of the Amazon River, 1820–1823)
- Born: Friedrich Hohe; 1802; Bayreuth, Bavaria, Germany
- Died: 1870 (aged 67–68); Munich, Bavaria, Germany
- Education: Royal Academy of Fine Arts, Munich
- Known for: Lithography and painting

Friedrich Hohe (1802 – 7 June 1870) was a German lithographer and painter. Born in Bayreuth, Bavaria, in 1802, his first painting teacher was his father, who was himself a painter. In 1820 he entered the Royal Academy of Fine Arts, Munich (also known as the Munich Academy). Thereafter, from 1823 till near the end of his life, he devoted himself to lithography.

In 1826 Hohe visited Italy with landscape painter Carl Rottmann. Two years later, he undertook publication of the Leuchtenberg Gallery (1831), and subsequently collaborated with Hanfstängl in the production of the Dresden Gallery (1864–1869).

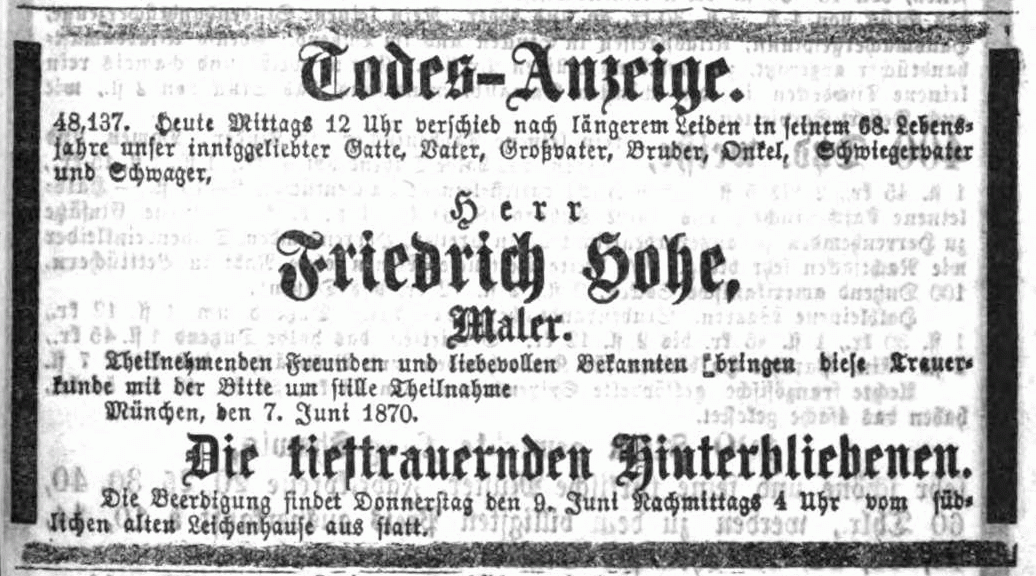
Announcement of Hohe's death in the 8 June 1870 issue of Neueste Nachrichten (Latest News)

Late in life, Hohe attempted landscape painting but was not very successful in it. He died in Munich on 7 June 1870. Hohe's older brother Nikolaus Christian Hohe (1798–1868) was also a painter.

== Works ==
Notable works by Hohe include The Entry of King Otho into Nauplia (after Peter Hess); Neue Maler Werke aus München (Works of New Painters from Munich, c. 1841), a collection of lithographs of selected paintings of living artists in Munich; illustrations of German classical ballads and romances with A. Brügger; and The Old Stag, a series of 12 plates.
