= Videvik =

Estonian newspaper

- Language: Estonian

Videvik was a newspaper published in Estonia.
