= Juliane von Schwellenberg =

Maid of Queen Charlotte of Great Britain

Juliane Elisabeth von Schwellenberg (1728–1797), also known as Madame Schwellenberg, was a bedchamber woman of the British queen Charlotte of Mecklenburg-Strelitz. She was a well known and prominent profile within the British royal court, where she took a dominant position; von Schwellenberg was a favourite and confidant of Queen Charlotte, and handled access between the Queen and various supplicants, which gave her an important influence. She is frequently mentioned in contemporary satires, songs, memoirs, diaries and other writings, such as those of her colleague Fanny Burney.

== Life ==
Juliane von Schwellenberg, alongside Johanna Hagedorn, was selected to accompany Charlotte from Mecklenburg-Strelitz to her wedding in Great Britain in 1761. In the British royal household, she was given the shared office (with Hagedorn) as "keeper of the robes" with responsibility for the queen's wardrobe and dressing.

She was the intimate confidante of the queen and as such wielded immense influence within the royal court. She initially demanded that any supplicant of the queen seek her permission before being admitted. This caused a conflict at court, and the queen was eventually forced to promise the king and her mother-in-law that Schwellenberg would be given no special privileges, in order to prevent Schwellenberg from being sent home to Germany. Despite this, in practice Schwellenberg promoted or refused supplicants access to the queen and as such had great influence over who would be given the queen's patronage, and it was noted that she received supplicants for tea in her rooms. One of those to whom she gave her – and the queen's – patronage was the artist Carl von Imhoff, whom she introduced to the queen.

In 1785, Johanna Hagedorn, whom she shared her office with, was replaced by Fanny Burney. Schwellenberg mistreated and looked down upon Burney due to her work as a novelist, and when Burney's failing health forced her to retire in 1790, Schwellenberg joined the queen's efforts to prevent her retirement.
