= Åre (disambiguation) =

Åre may refer to:

- Åre, a locality in Sweden
- Åre Municipality in Sweden
- Åre ski resort in Sweden
