= Aare Heinvee =

Estonian politician

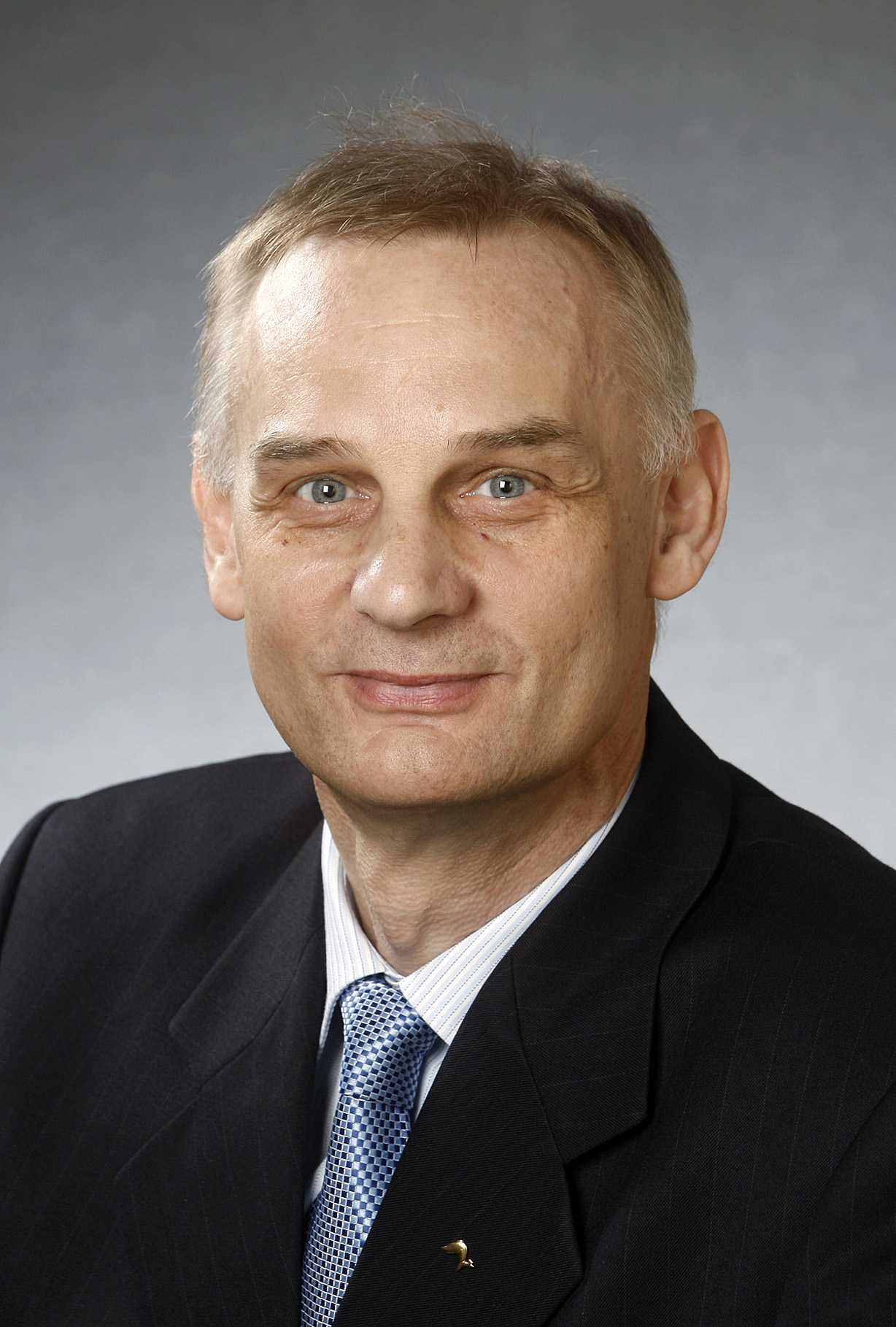
Aare Heinvee

Aare Heinvee (born 27 September 1956) is an Estonian politician. He has been member of XII Riigikogu.

He is a member of Estonian Reform Party.
