= Ann Arbor (automobile) =

Defunct American motor vehicle manufacturer

The Ann Arbor Convertible Car was a vehicle manufactured in Ann Arbor, Michigan, by the Huron River Manufacturing Company from 1911 to 1912. The Ann Arbor Convertible Car was a dual-purpose vehicle, which could be converted from a small pickup, to an automobile to carry passengers. Only a few vehicles were built before the company shut down production and sold the plant. Only one surviving vehicle is known to still exist.

== Huron River Manufacturing Company ==
Huron River Manufacturing Company
- Type: Automotive industry
- Founded: 1910
- Founder: E.D. Hiscock, President
- Defunct: 1912
- Successor: Star Motor Car Company
- Headquarters: Ann Arbor, Michigan

The Huron River Manufacturing Company was incorporated in Ann Arbor, Michigan in 1910. A number of local and regional businessmen were appointed to senior management including E. D. Hiscock, president; Gottlob Luick, vice-president; W.H.L. Rhode, treasurer; D.C. Chipman, secretary; Charles Hiscock, George Seabolt, and G.L. Coffinberry, the latter of Cleveland, Ohio. The company acquired a single-story plant (measuring 256 feet by 100 feet) which had been built by the Fawn River Manufacturing Company to expand their manufacture or magnetos. They sold the plant to Huron River Manufacturing before occupancy. A few vehicles were manufactured but Huron River Manufacturing continuously lost money and in 1912 agreed to their stock for shares of Star Motor Car Company of Augusta, Maine which planned to take over production in the Ann Arbor plant. Estimates of production are not available but the best information suggests less than a dozen were made under Huron River management. Star never manufactured vehicles there and the plant was sold to a variety of other manufacturers before burning down in the last 1920s or early 1930s.

== Ann Arbor Convertible Car ==
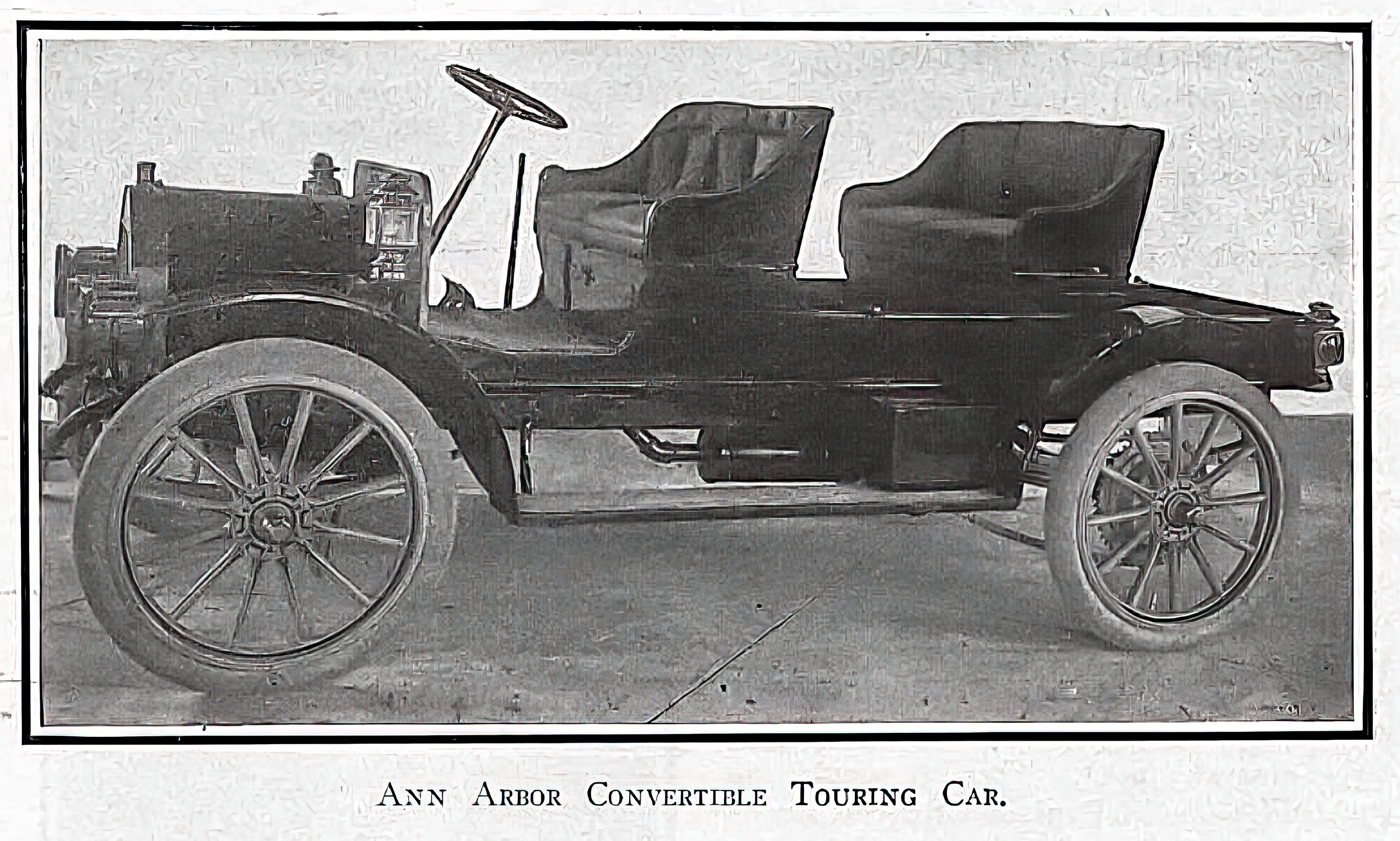
1911 Ann Arbor Convertible Car

The Ann Arbor Convertible Car was envisioned to be a dual-purpose vehicle for the livery and light delivery market. The chassis could be configured either with a flat bed behind the driver's seat with raised (but removable) sides, or with the sides removed, it could be configured with one or two seats in a row behind the driver's seat. With all seats installed, it could carry six people. To protect passengers from inclement weather, a full-length foldable top was mounted to the third seat. The vehicle sold for $975 which compared favorably to the price of a Ford Model T, which was $800 at the time.

The vehicle was shown in trade journals as being powered by a gasoline engine with two opposed cylinders of stroke and bore of five inches. Strangely, the only vehicle to survive is powered by a four-cylinder gasoline engine manufactured by Davis, which was determined to have been the originally-installed engine. Power was transmitted to the rear wheels by a rear-mounted gear box with dual chain drives. The vehicle had a 108-inch wheel-base and weighed 2,140 pounds. The manufacturer quoted a top speed of 25 mph.

== See also ==
- Brass Era car
