= Aar (Ill) =

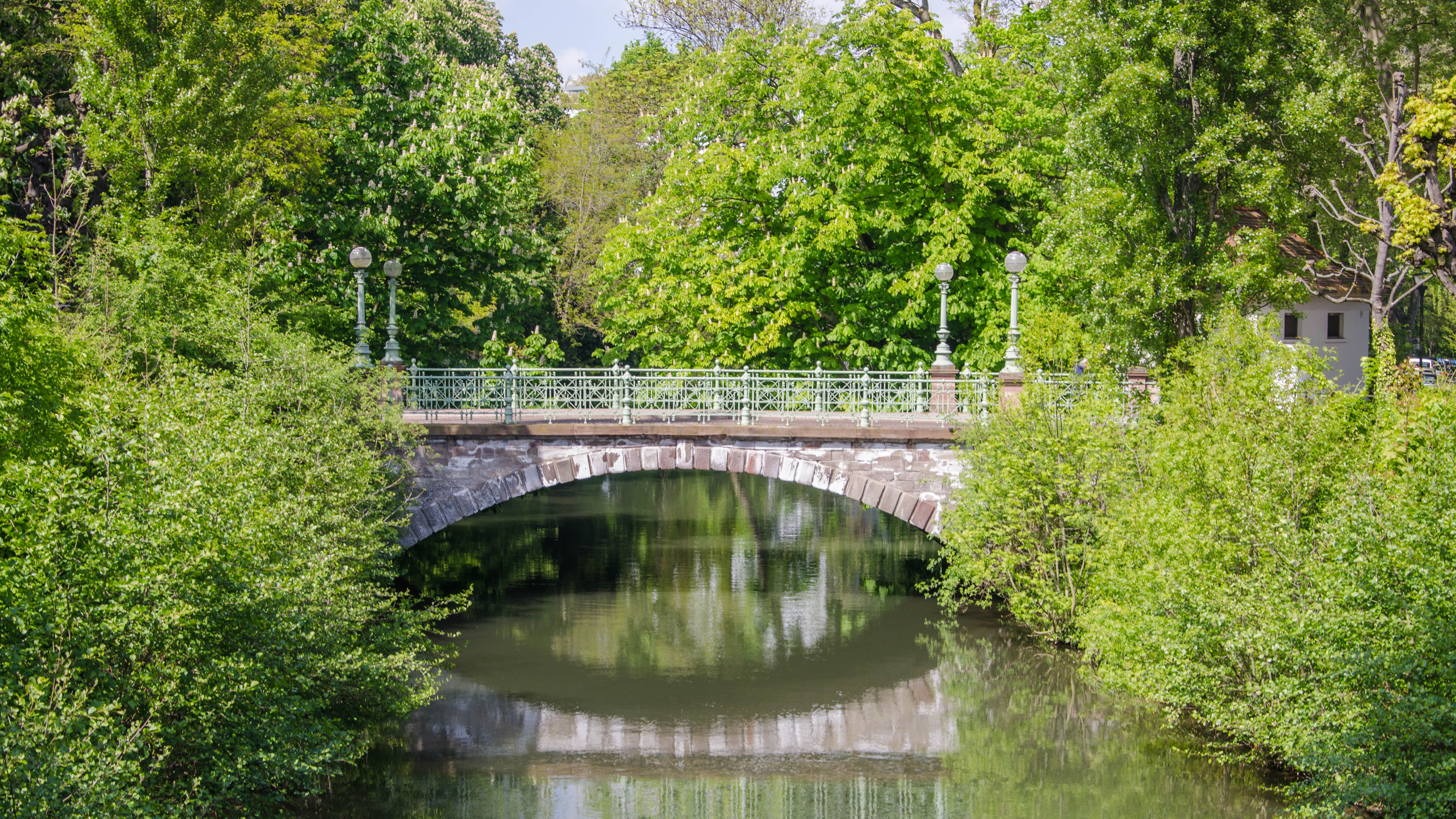
- Pont Abraham Deutsch

Location
- Country: France
- Region: Grand Est
- Department: Bas-Rhin, Haut-Rhin

Physical characteristics
- Source: Ill
  - location: Strasbourg
  - coordinates: 48°35′07″N 7°45′32″E
- Mouth: Ill
  - location: Schiltigheim
  - coordinates: 48°36′10″N 7°45′55″E
- Length: 3 kilometres (1.9 mi)

Basin features
- River system: Rhine

The Aar (French pronunciation: [aʁ]) is a river in the administrative district of Bas-Rhin which crosses the municipalities of Strasbourg and Schiltigheim. It is an arm which separates from the Ill at the University bridge to rejoin it at lock no 51 in Schiltigheim. Together the Aar and the Ill form the island of Saint-Hélène.

== Geography ==
The Aar is 3 kilometres (1.9 mi) long. It separates from the Ill at the southern tip of Île Sainte-Hélène, near St. Paul's Church, Strasbourg, and crosses the Contades and Wacken neighborhoods. It rejoins the Ill at Schiltigheim after having crossed the Marne–Rhine Canal thanks to a dam with several gates.

== Environment ==
There is a walking route, the "two rivers route", and sports equipment along the banks of the river. The river borders the Aar Park, which has allotment gardens and the sports complex. The river flows through a calm, green landscape, and is used by coypus and birds such as kingfishers, herons, cormorants, swans, coots and moorhens. There are old wash-houses along the bank. The river is used for canoeing and kayaking.

== Gallery ==
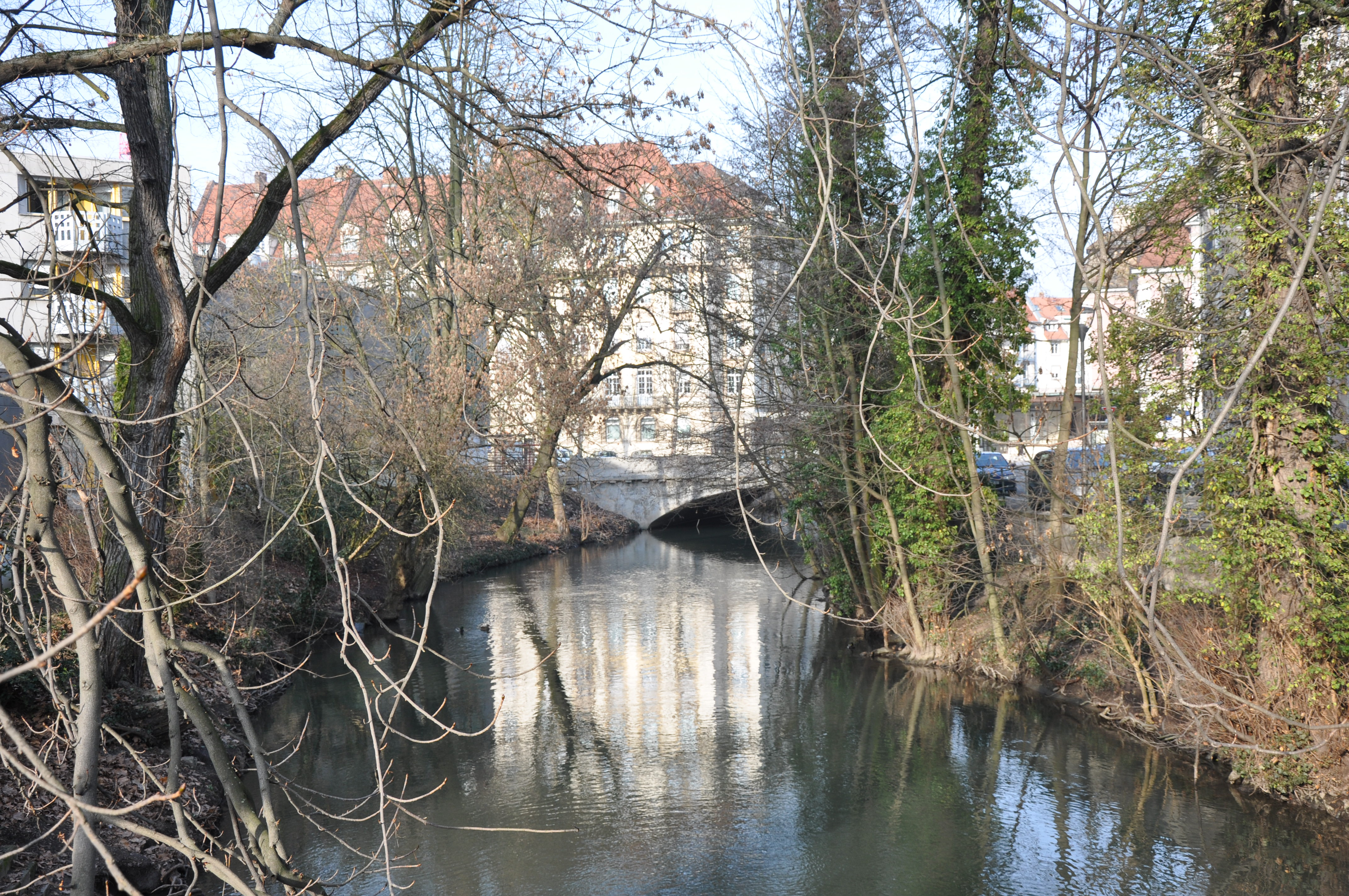
Pont de la Protestation

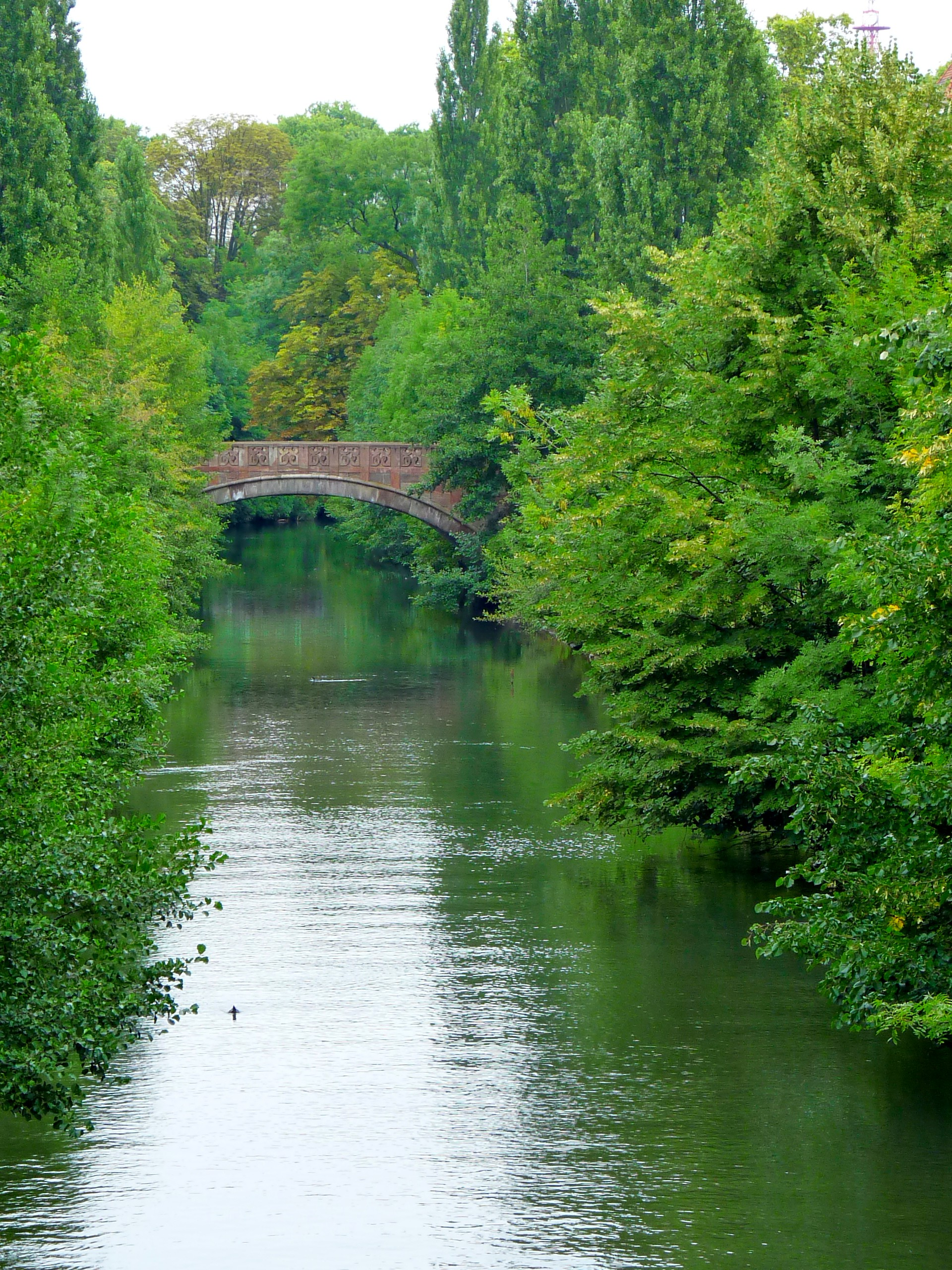
The Aar and the Vosges Bridge in Strasbourg

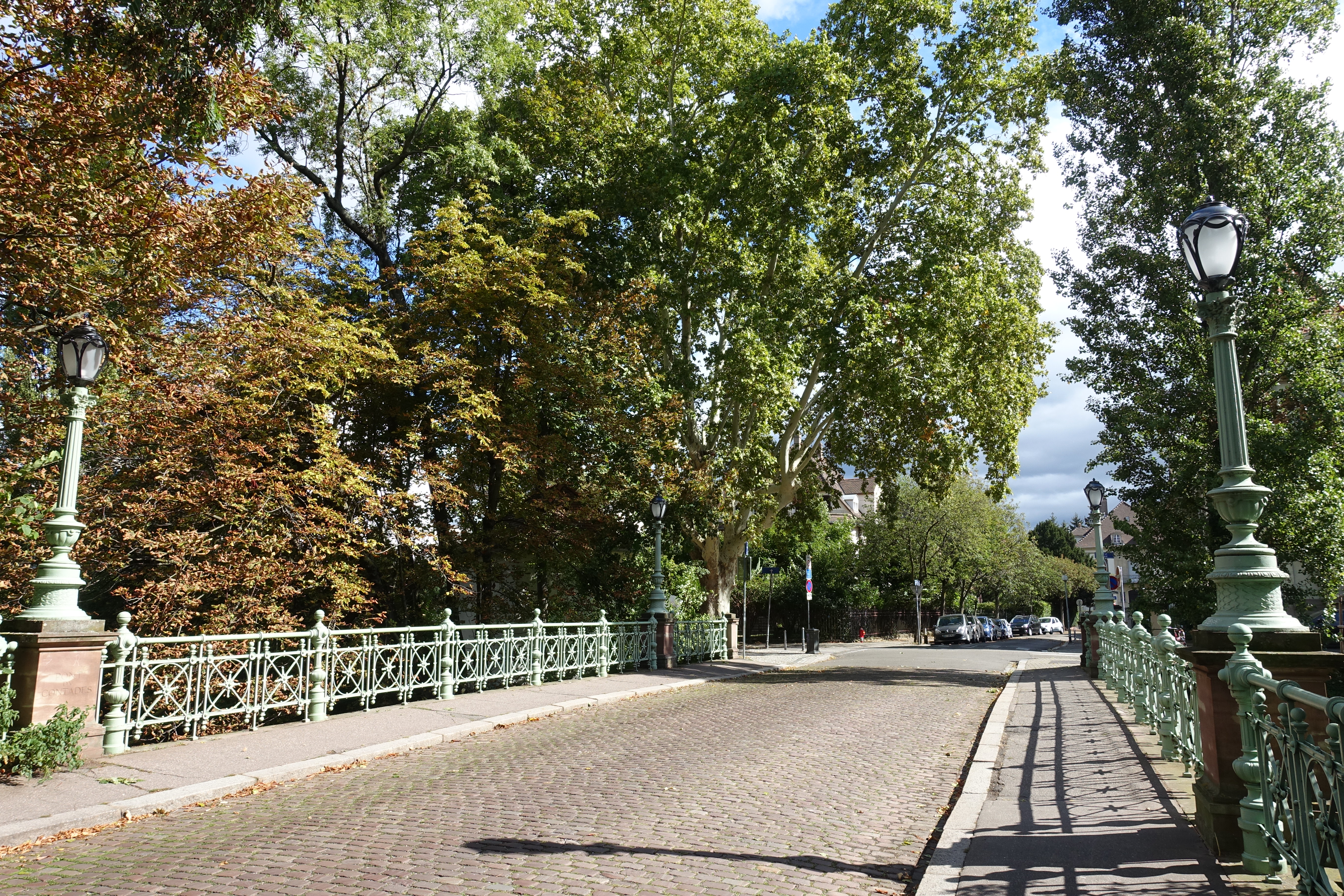
Pont Abraham Deutsch

== Sources ==
- Cours d'eau - L'Aar, Sandre; Service d'administration nationale des données et référentiels sur l'eau
- Rives de l'Aar (in French), Schiltigheim
- "Strasbourg, Circular Tour of the River Aar", strasbourgeauxvives.org
