= Ann Arbor Railroad =

Ann Arbor Railroad may refer to:

- Ann Arbor Railroad (1895–1976), one of the bankrupt railroads that was reorganized in 1976
- Ann Arbor Railroad (1988), a shortline railroad that operates the south end of the former Ann Arbor Railroad (1895-1976)
- Ann Arbor Railroad main line, the line built by the original railroad
