= 1800s =

1800s may refer to:

- The century from 1800 to 1899, almost synonymous with the 19th century (1801–1900)
- 1800s (decade), the period from 1800 to 1809
