= Helena Roque Gameiro =

Portuguese watercolorist (1895–1986)

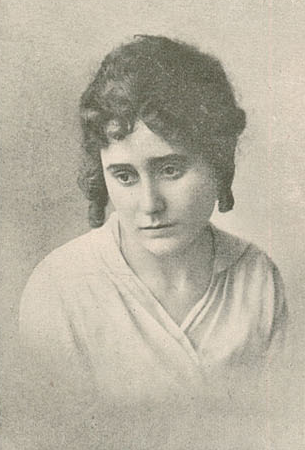
- Helena Roque Gameiro, from Ilustracao Portugueza, 1919
- Born: Helena Roque Gameiro; August 2, 1895; Lapa, Lisbon, Portugal
- Died: April 26, 1986 (aged 90); São Mamede, Lisbon, Portugal
- Resting place: Prazeres
- Known for: Watercolours, painting, drawing
- Spouse: José Leitão de Barros

Helena Roque Gameiro Leitao de Barros (1895–1986) was a Portuguese watercolourist and painter.

== Biography ==
Helena Roque Gameiro was the daughter of painter Alfredo Roque Gameiro and Maria da Assuncao de Carvalho Forte. Her sisters Raquel, Màmia and brothers Manuel and Ruy were also artists. At the age of 14, she began teaching drawing and painting at her father's studio located on Rua D. Pedro V in Lisbon.

Roque Gameiro became professor of Decorative Arts at Escola Secundária Artística António Arroio and served for over 25 years. On 14 June 1940 she was made an Officer of the Order of Public Instruction.

Roque Gameiro married film director Jose Leitao de Barros on 17 August 1923 in Oeiras. The couple had two children, José Manuel and Maria Helena.

== Career ==
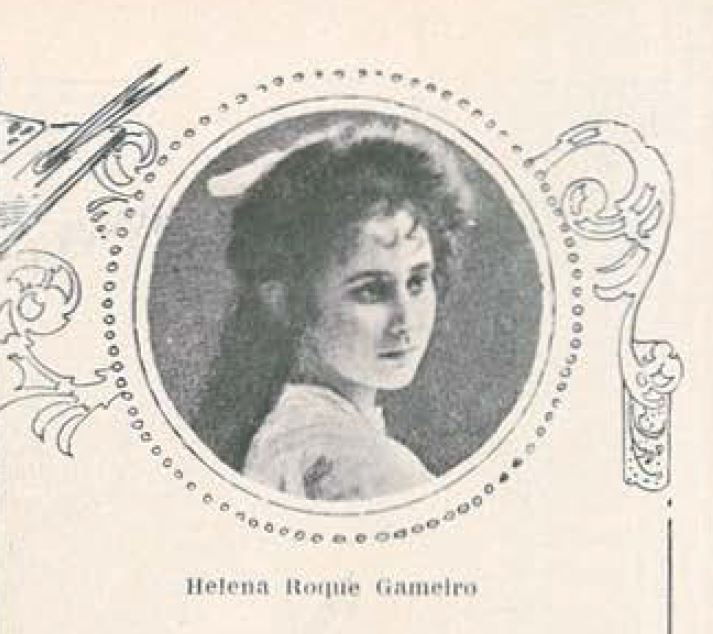
Helena Roque Gameiro in 1914

Along with her siblings Raquel and Manuel, Helena Roque Gameiro participated in a 1911 exhibition held in her father's studio. She also exhibited watercolors in several exhibitions at the Sociedade Nacional de Belas Artes (SNBA) in 1912, 1915, 1924, and 1925. At the 10th Exhibition in 1913 she received an honorable mention in the Watercolor category. She also participated in the first SNBA Watercolor Exhibition in 1914. In 1917, she won first place in the Watercolour category in the Third Watercolor, Drawing and Miniature Exhibition. In 1920, she accompanied her father to Rio de Janeiro and São Paulo, where she was well received. In May 1922, she organized an exhibition of Applied Art. She later presented her work in January 1923. In 1933 she exhibited in Porto with her father and sister Raquel.

After the death of her father in 1935, Roque Gameiro ceased exhibiting her work, only participating in an exhibition of her watercolors in 1947 held in the National Information Secretariat.

She died on 26 April 1986 and is buried in Prazeres Cemetery.

Roque Gameiro's work is part of a number of national museums and galleries, including: the National Museum of Contemporary Art (Portugal), the Jose Malhoa Museum, the Grão Vasco National Museum and the Museum of Modern Art, Rio de Janeiro.
