= Alfredo Roque Gameiro =

Portuguese painter and graphic artist (1864–1935)

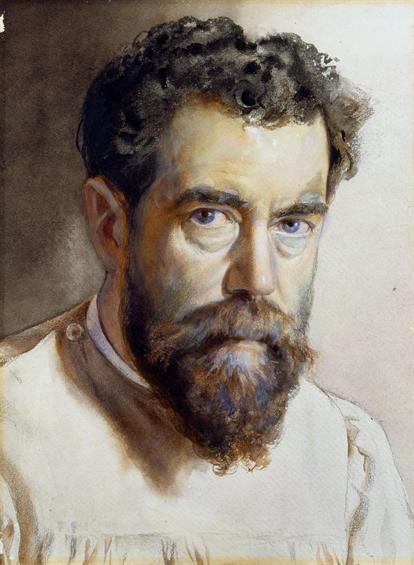
- Self-portrait (1910s), by Veloso Salgado; José Malhoa Museum, Caldas da Rainha
- Born: April 4, 1864; Alcanena, Minde, Portugal
- Died: August 5, 1935 (aged 71); Lisbon, Portugal

Alfredo Roque Gameiro (4 April 1864 - 15 August 1935) was a Portuguese painter and graphic artist.

== Biography ==
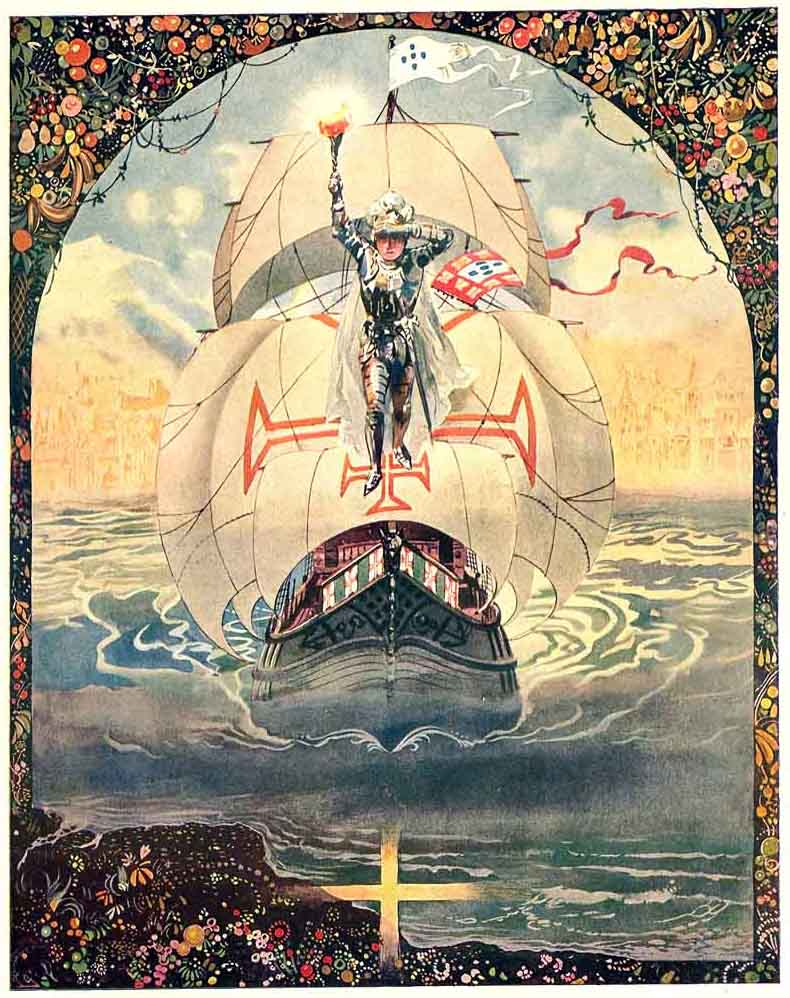
Frontispiece of "História da Colonização Portuguesa do Brasil", illustrated by Roque Gameiro, 1921

Alfredo Roque Gameiro was born in Minde, Portugal. When he was ten years old, he went to live in Lisbon with his oldest brother, Justin, who owned a lithography studio. He studied at the "Faculty of Fine Arts" of the University of Lisbon, where José Simões de Almeida was one of his professors. After receiving a scholarship from the Portuguese government, he attended the "Hochschule für Grafik und Buchkunst" in Leipzig and studied lithography with Ludwig Nieper (1826–1906). Upon returning to Portugal in 1886, he became the Director of the "Companhia Nacional Editora" and, in 1894, was appointed a professor at the "Escola Industrial do Príncipe Real".

He was a frequent contributor to several weekly and monthly periodicals and worked with Manuel de Macedo (1839–1915) to provide illustrations for a deluxe edition of The Lusiads, published in 1900. From 1910 to 1920 he created 10 watercolors and 90 lithographs for what would be his most popular work, Lisboa Velha (Old Lisbon), with an introduction by the poet Afonso Lopes Vieira. He also illustrated several popular novels by Júlio Dinis. In 1919, he became the first Director of the "Escola de Arte Aplicada de Lisboa", a position he held until 1930. The following year, he and his daughter Helena had a successful joint exhibition in Brazil. He was elected a member of the Real Academia de Bellas Artes de San Fernando in 1923.

Three institutions bear his name: the "Escola Roque Gameiro" in Amadora (where he lived for many years), the "Casa Roque Gameiro" (his home, partly designed by Raul Lino; now an exhibition space) and the "Centro de Artes e Ofícios Roque Gameiro" in his hometown, which includes a museum devoted to watercolors. A majority of his works are on display at the municipal museum there, including many on loan from the Gulbenkian Foundation. Some of his designs appear on Portuguese postage stamps. All five of his children became artists:

- Raquel Roque Gameiro Ottolini (1889–1970), also a watercolorist,
- Manuel Roque Gameiro (1890–1944), who worked with diverse materials.
- Helena Roque Gameiro (1895–1986), a landscape painter who married the film director José Leitão de Barros,
- Maria Emília (Màmia) Roque Gameiro (1901–1996), oil and watercolor painter; married to painter Jaime Martins Barata
- Ruy Roque Gameiro (1907–1935), a sculptor who, despite his short life, is the best-known. His sculptures may be seen in Portugal and Mozambique.

== Works ==
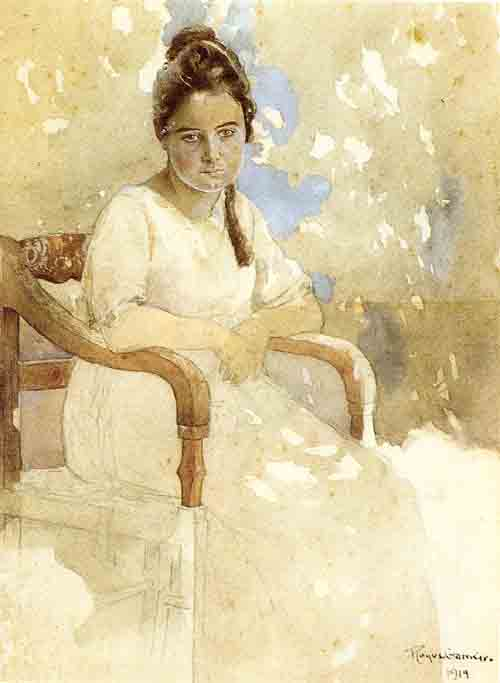
Portrait of his daughter Màmia (1919)

=== Quadros da História de Portugal ===
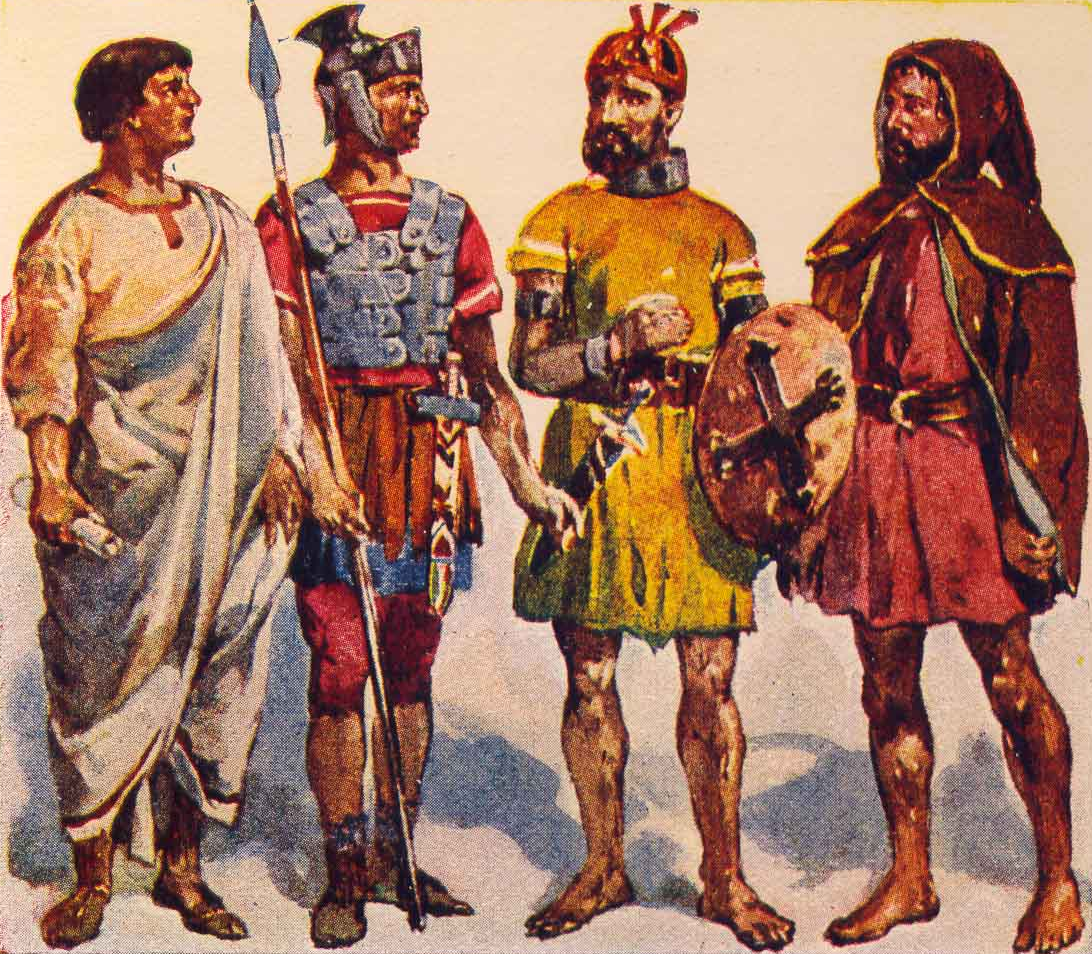
"Romans and Lusitanians"

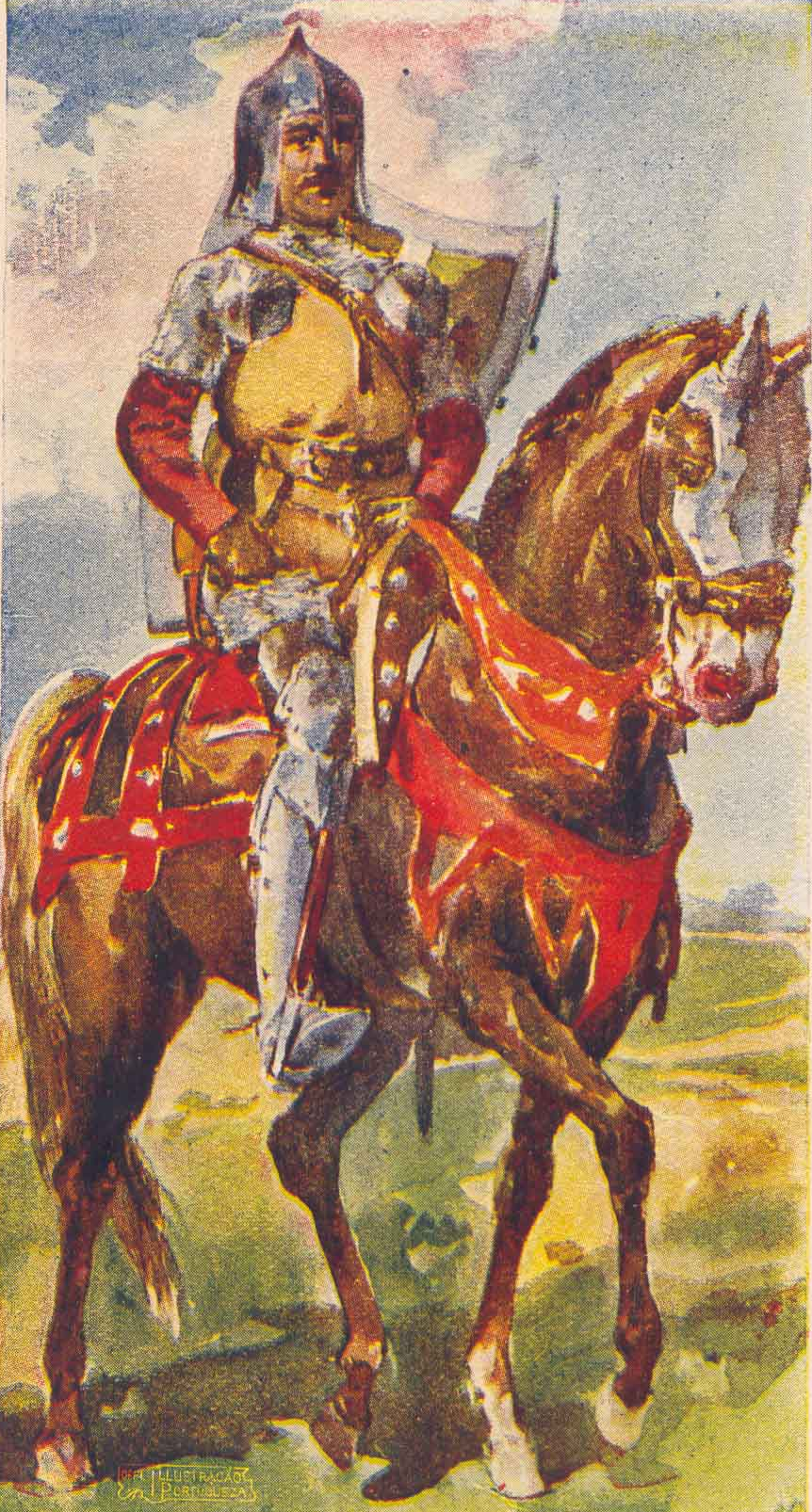
"Medieval knight"

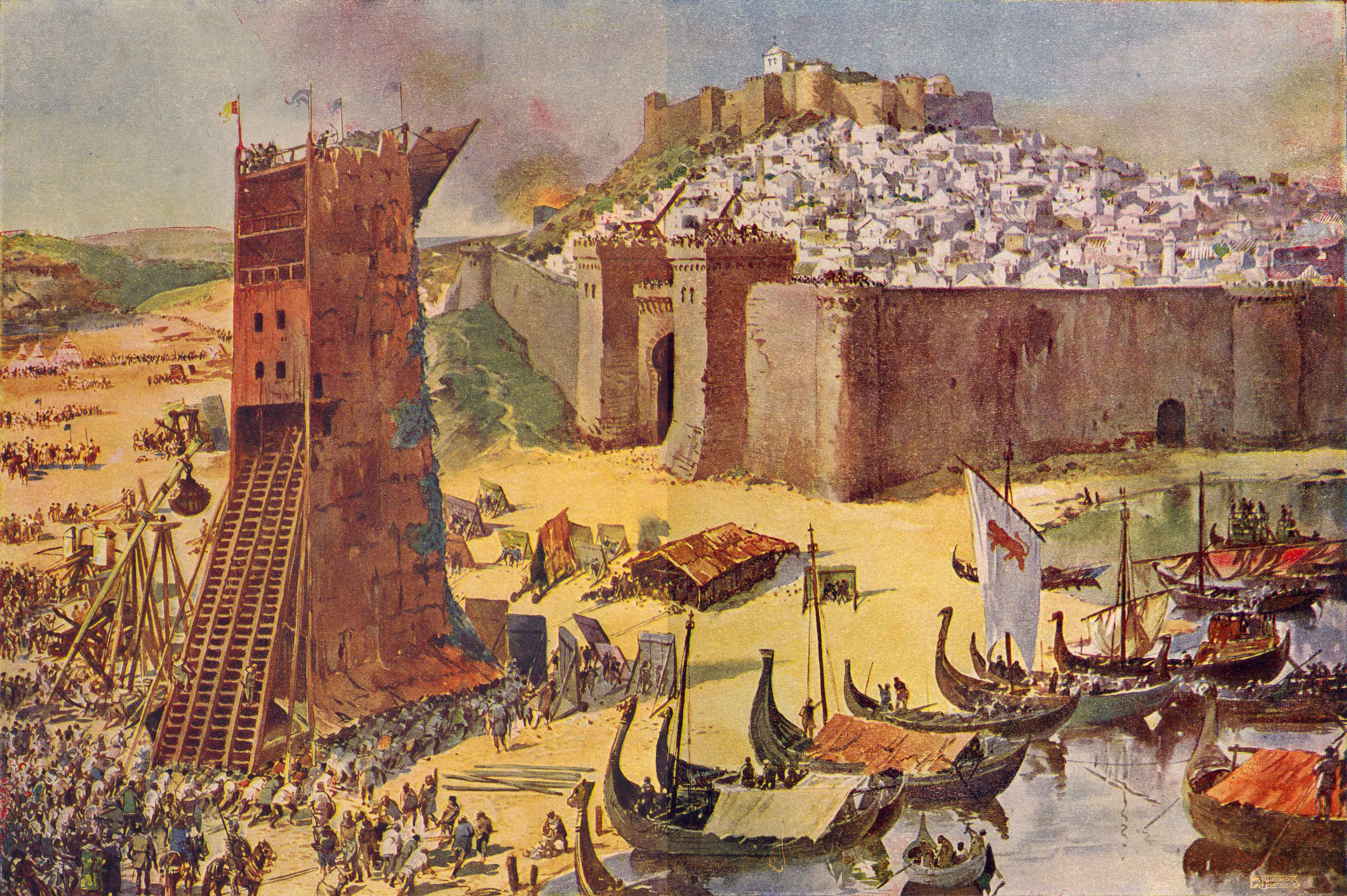
"Conquest of Lisbon"

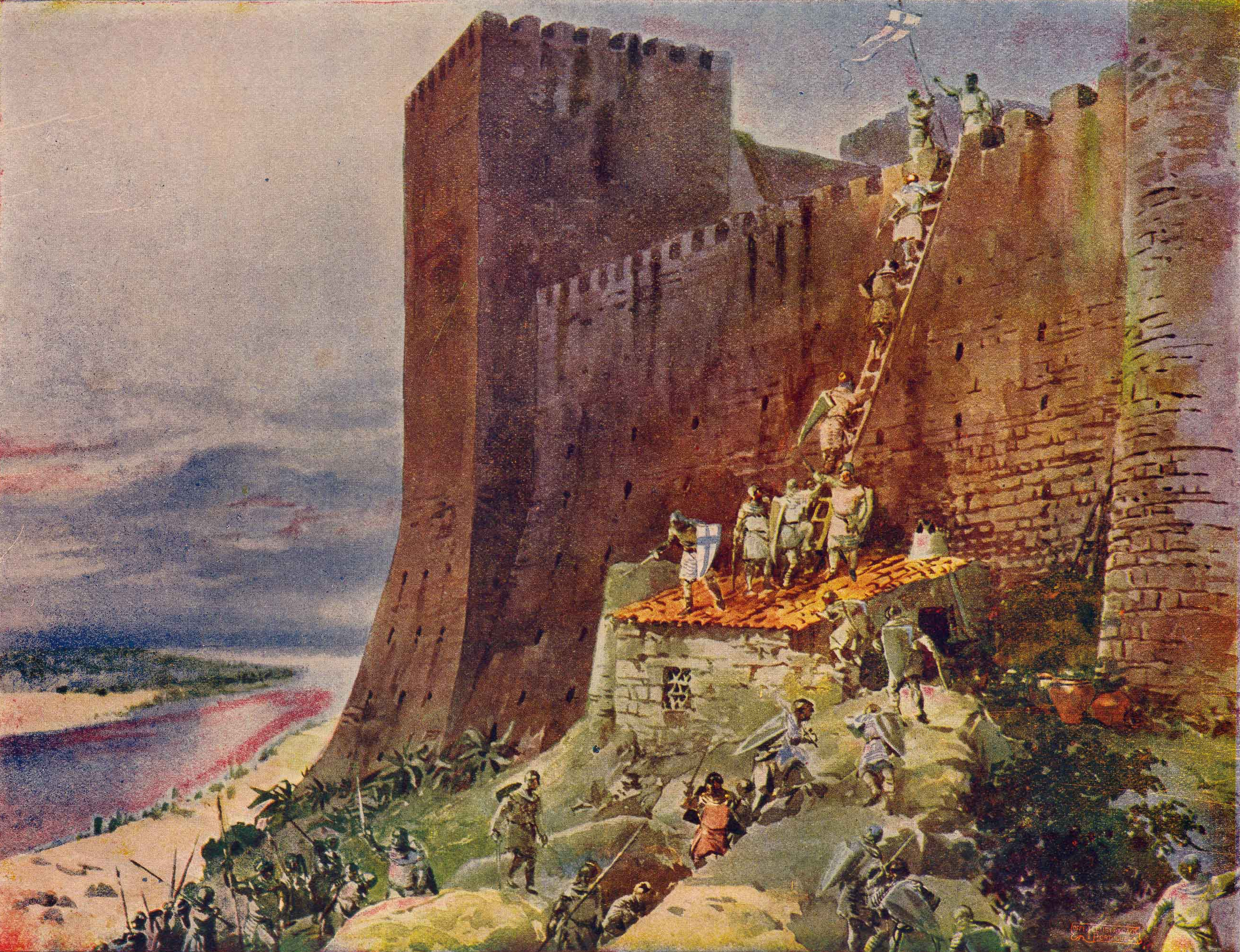
"The Taking of Santarém"

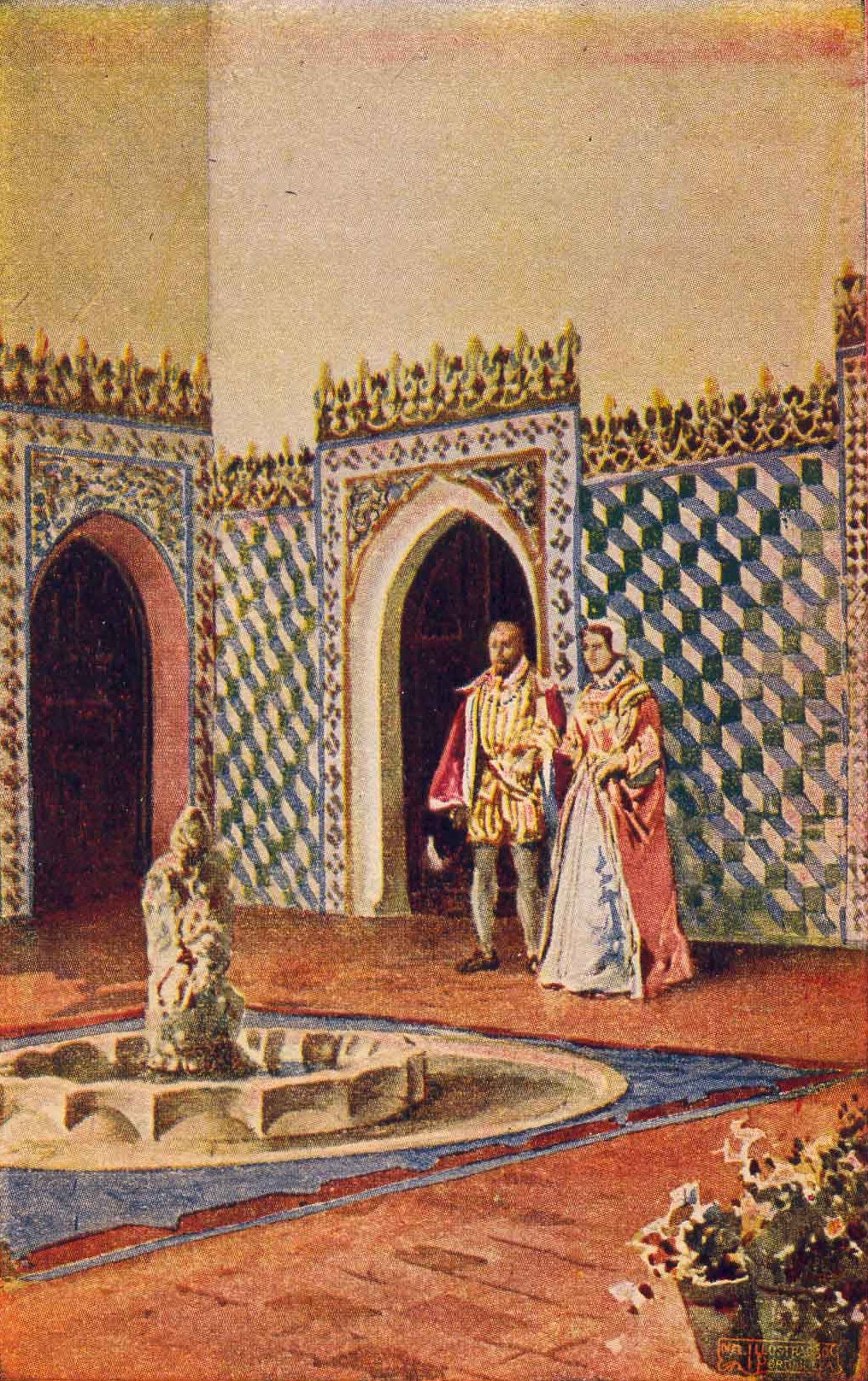
"Moorish Room in Sintra"

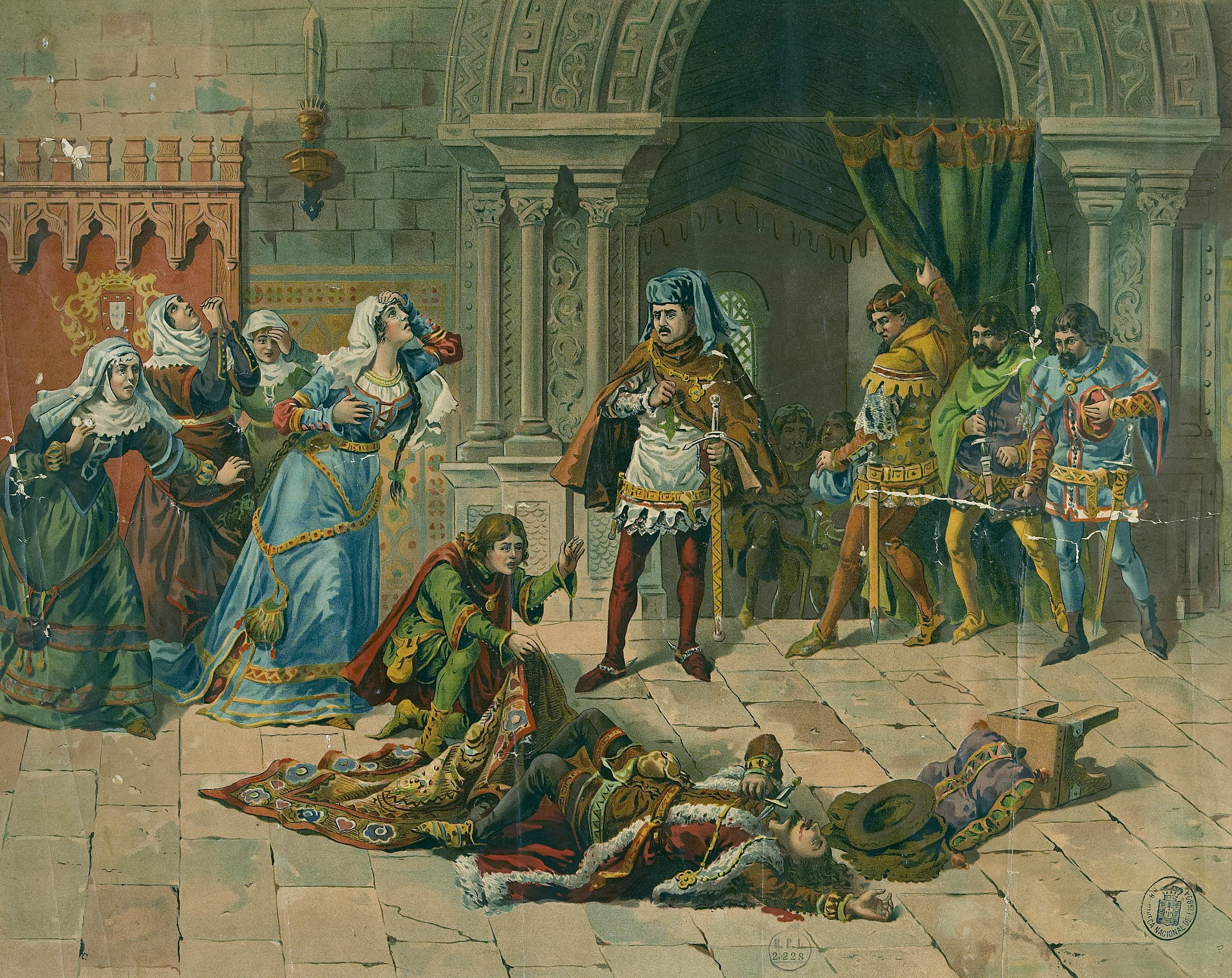
"Leonor Telles Before the Corpse of the Count Andeiro"

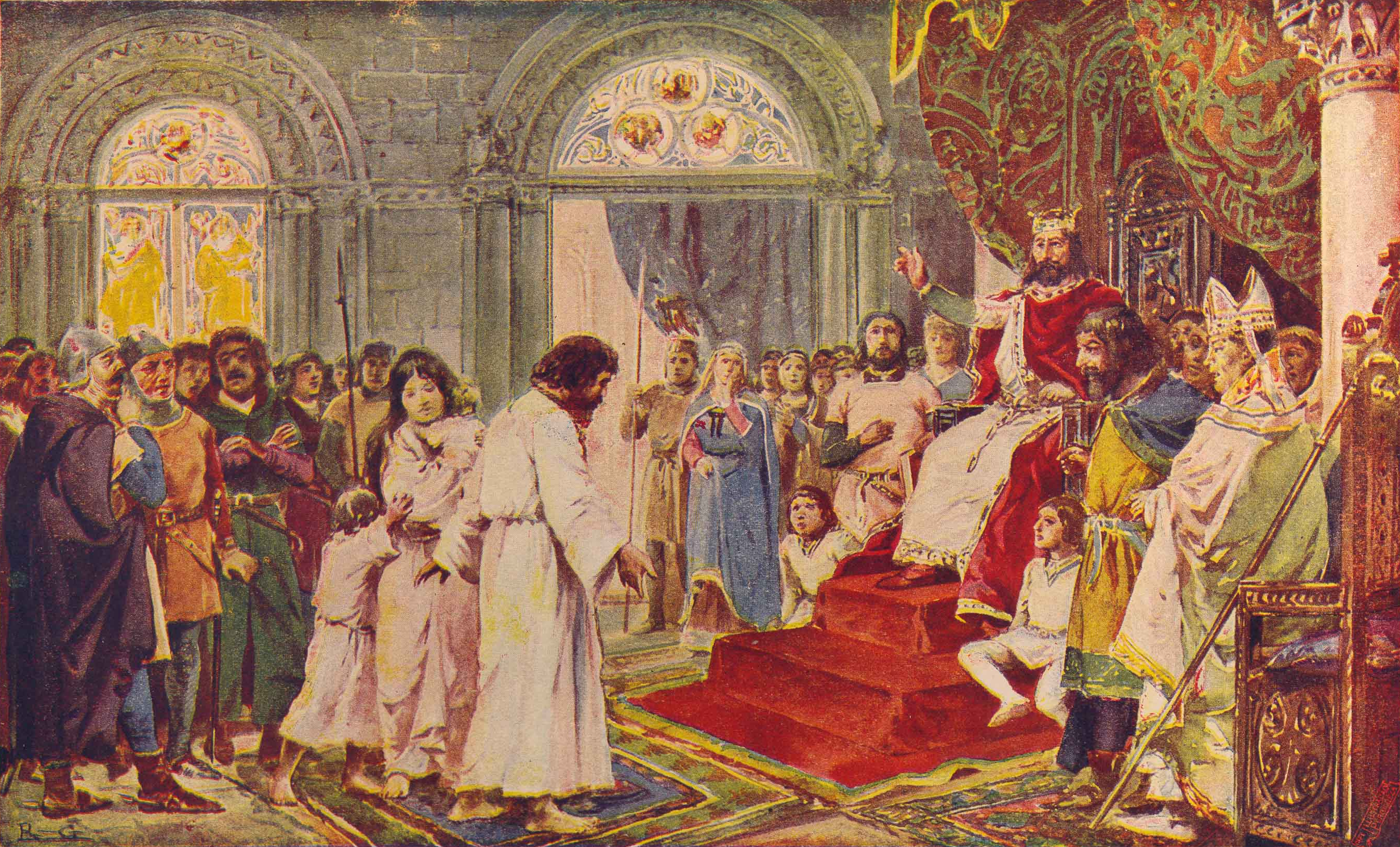
"Egas Moniz in Leon"

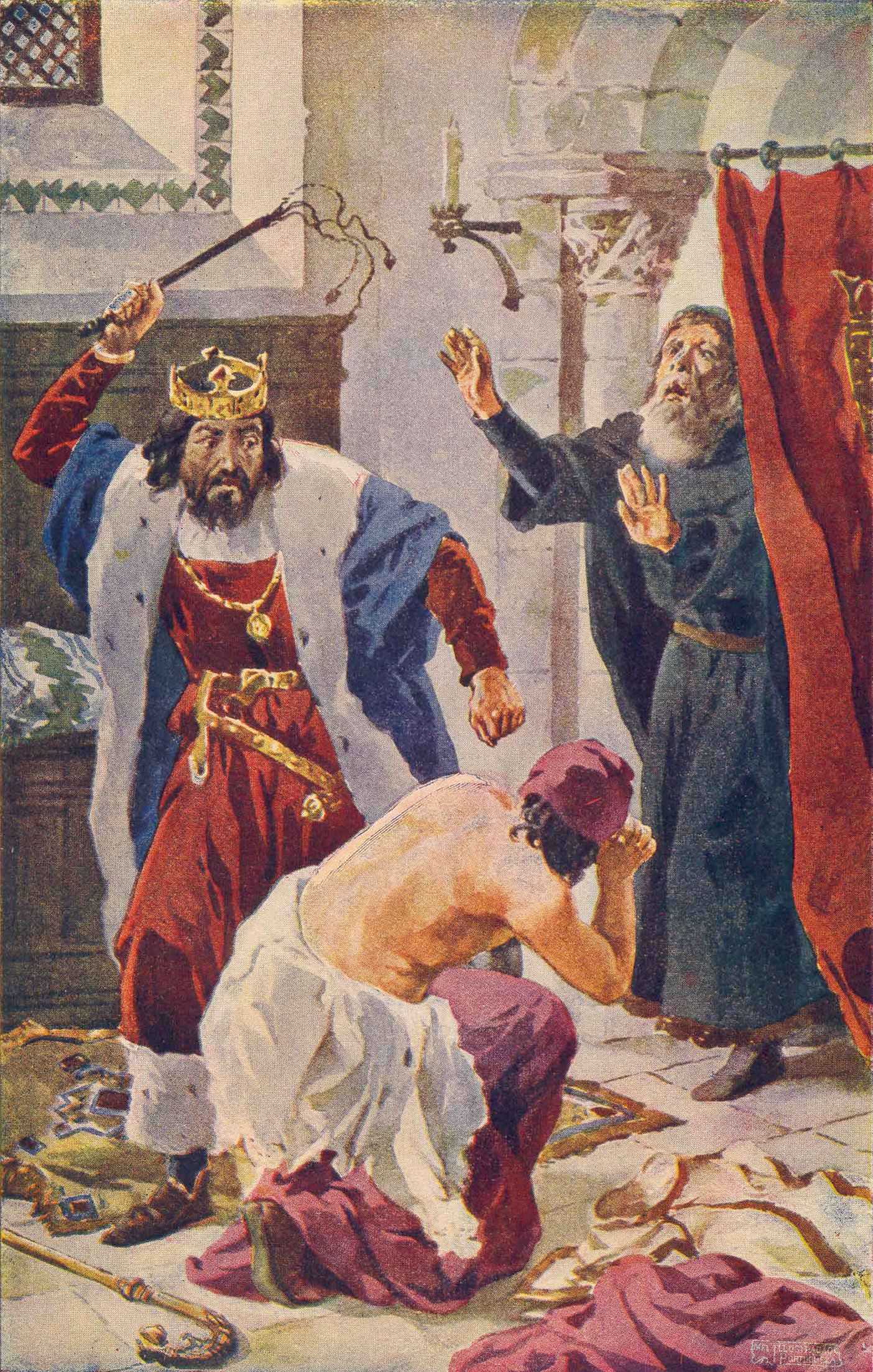
"Dom Pedro Punishes the Bishop of Porto"

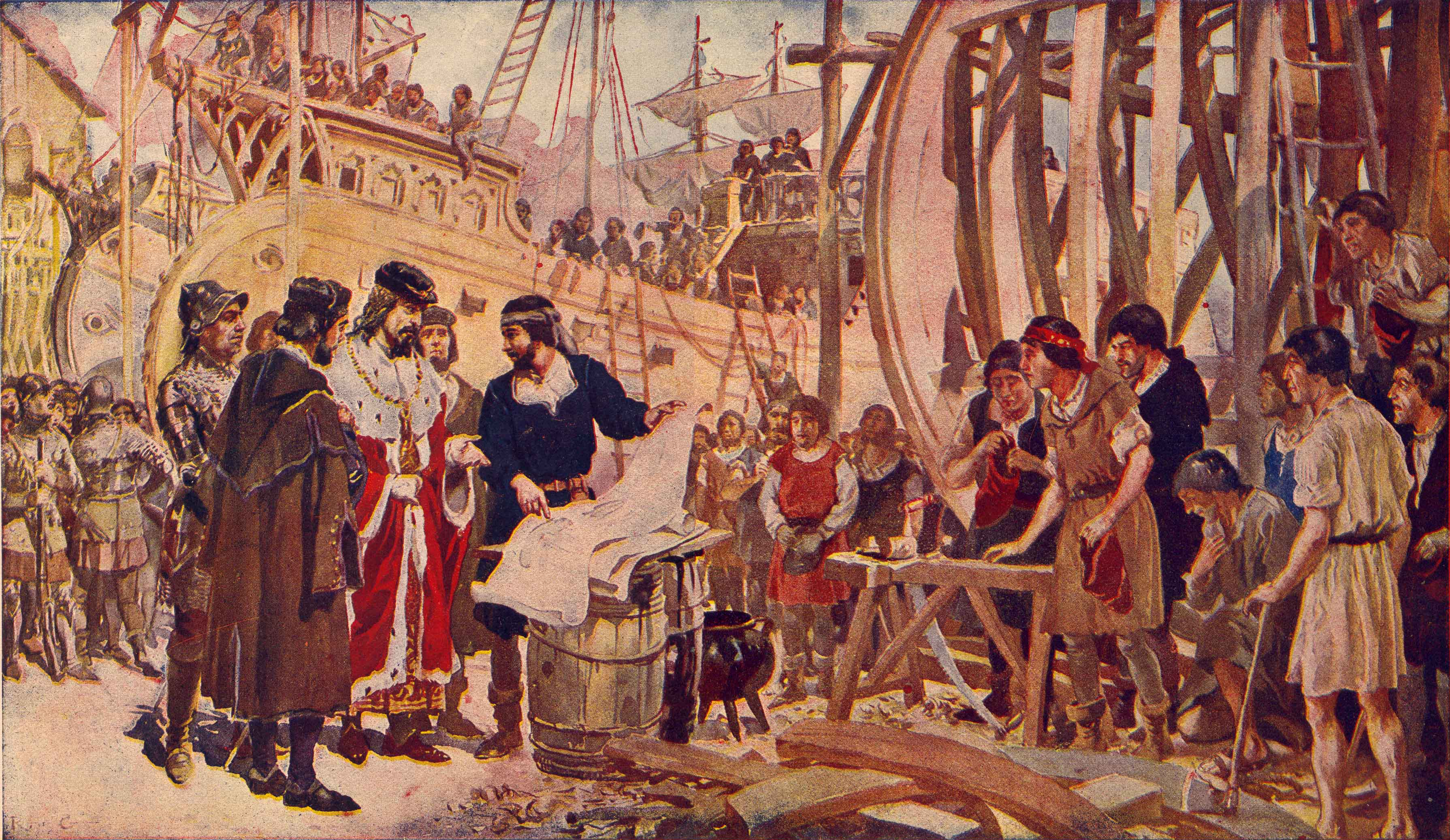
"John II inspects the Construction of the Naus"

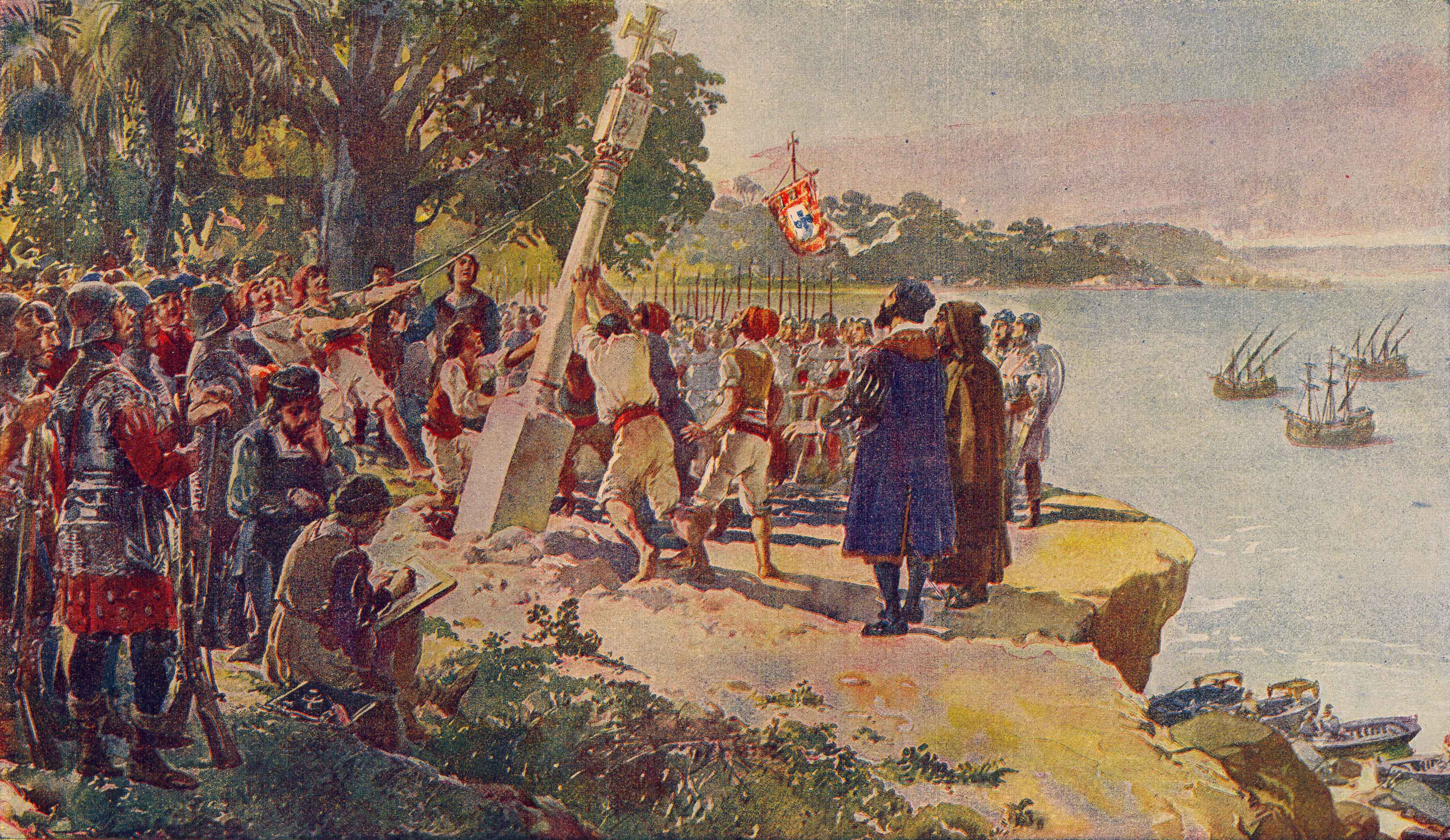
"Marker raised by the Portuguese by the Mouth of the River Zaire"

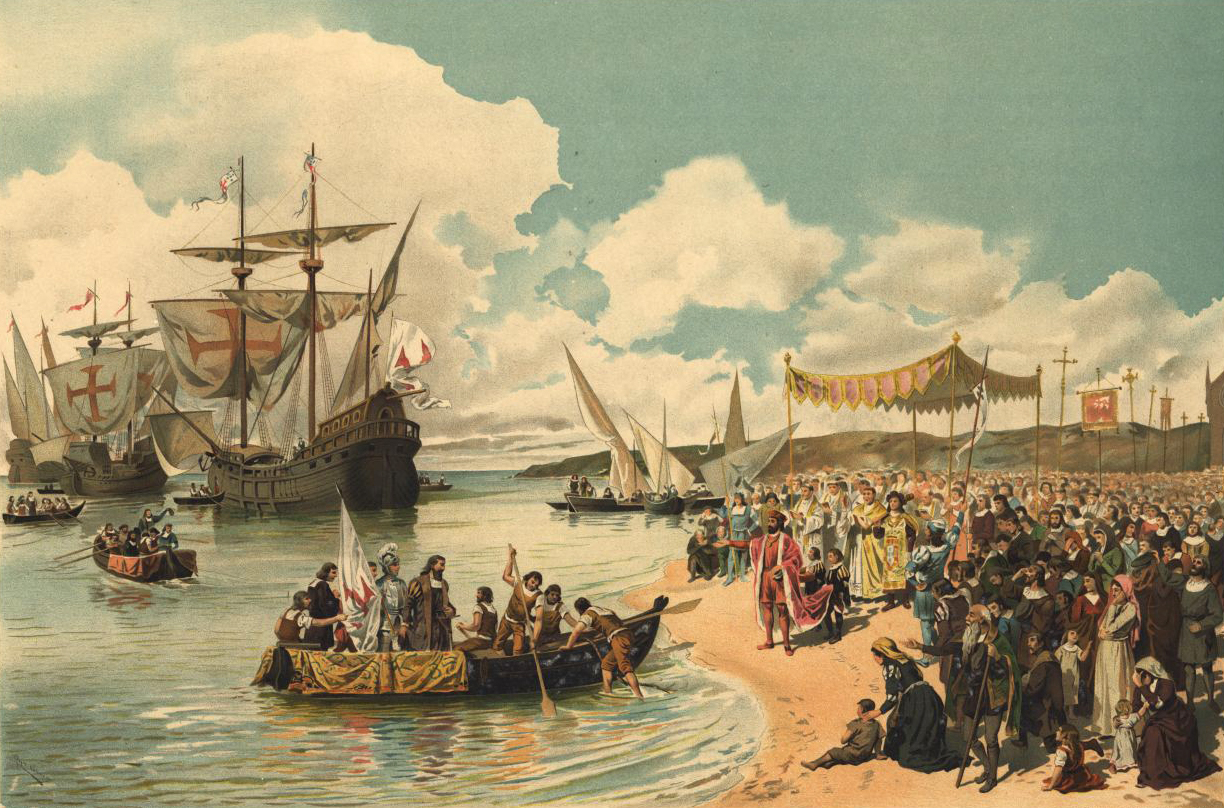
"Departure of Vasco da Gama to India"

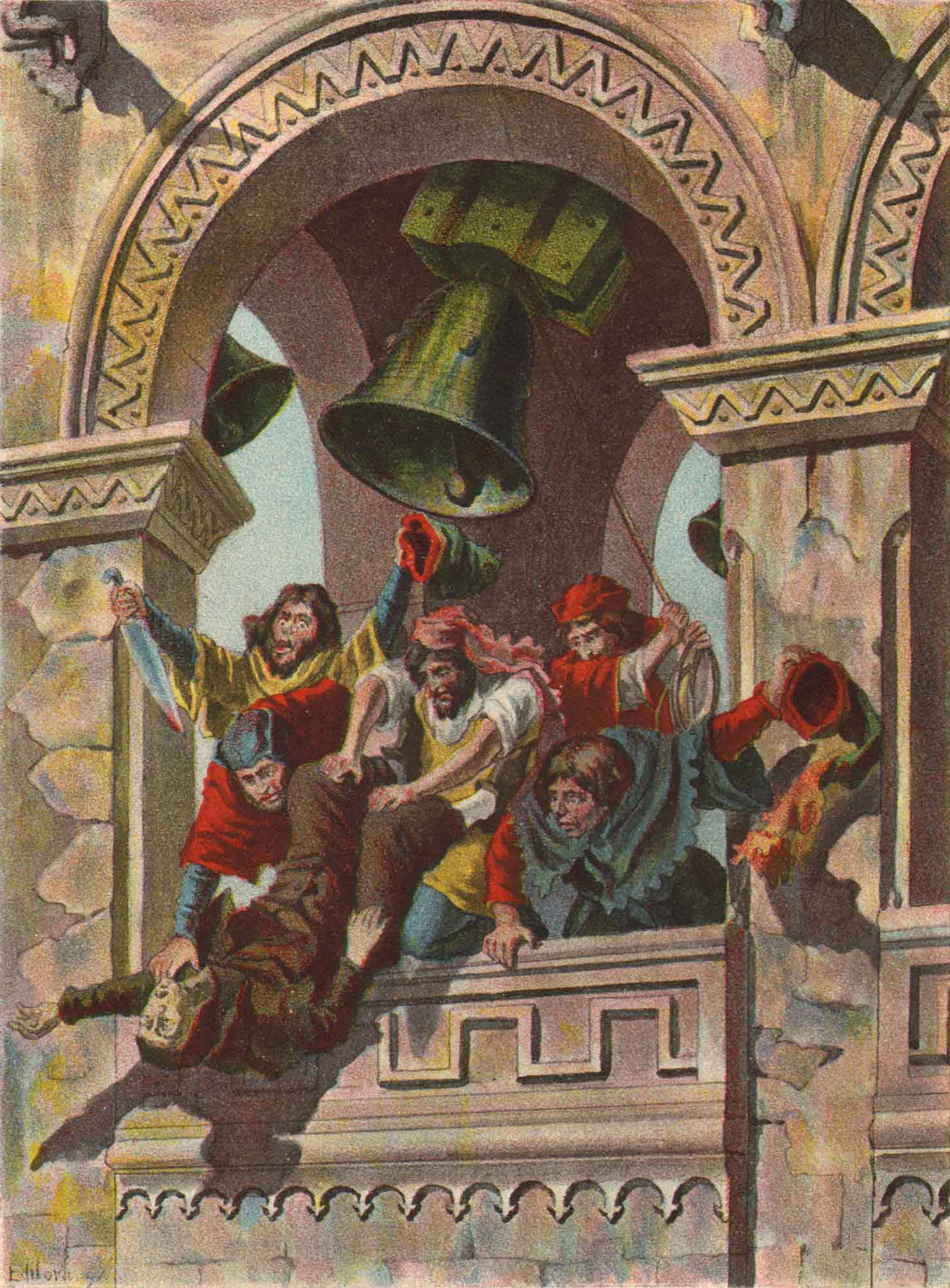
"The People Throw the Body of the Bishop Dom Martinho from the Tower of the Cathedral in a Mutiny"

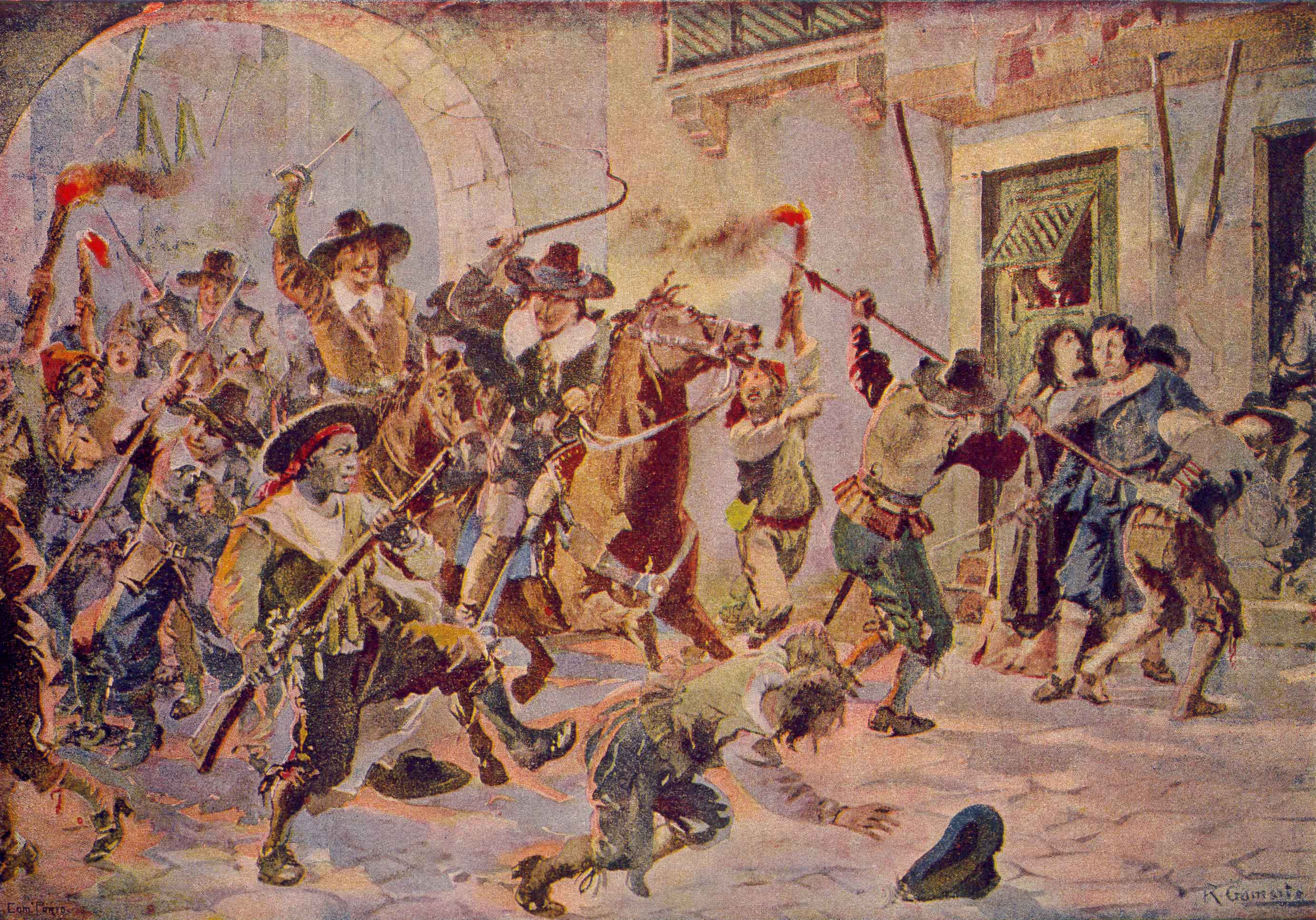
"Disturbances of Afonso VI in Lisbon"

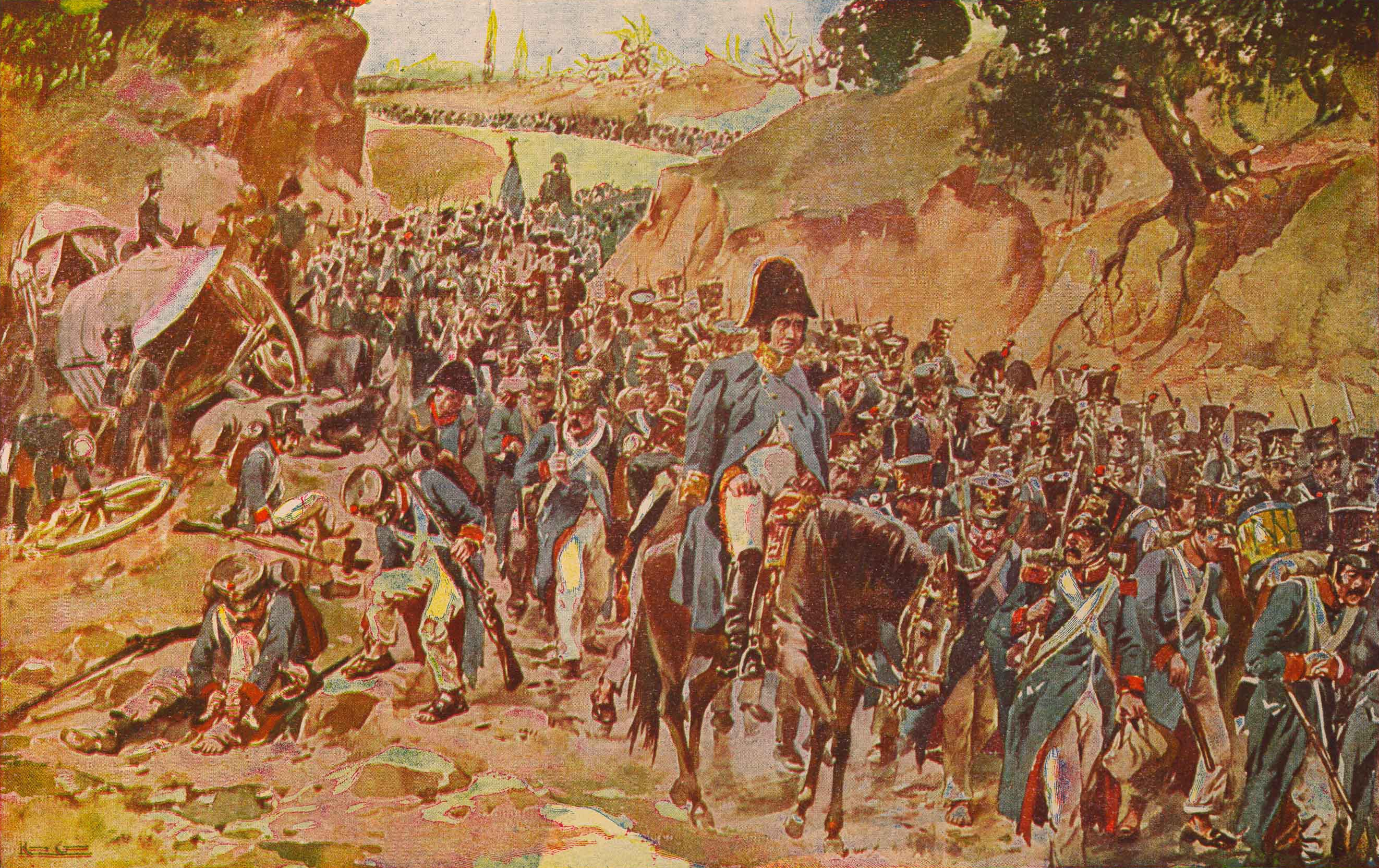
"The French in the First Invasion"

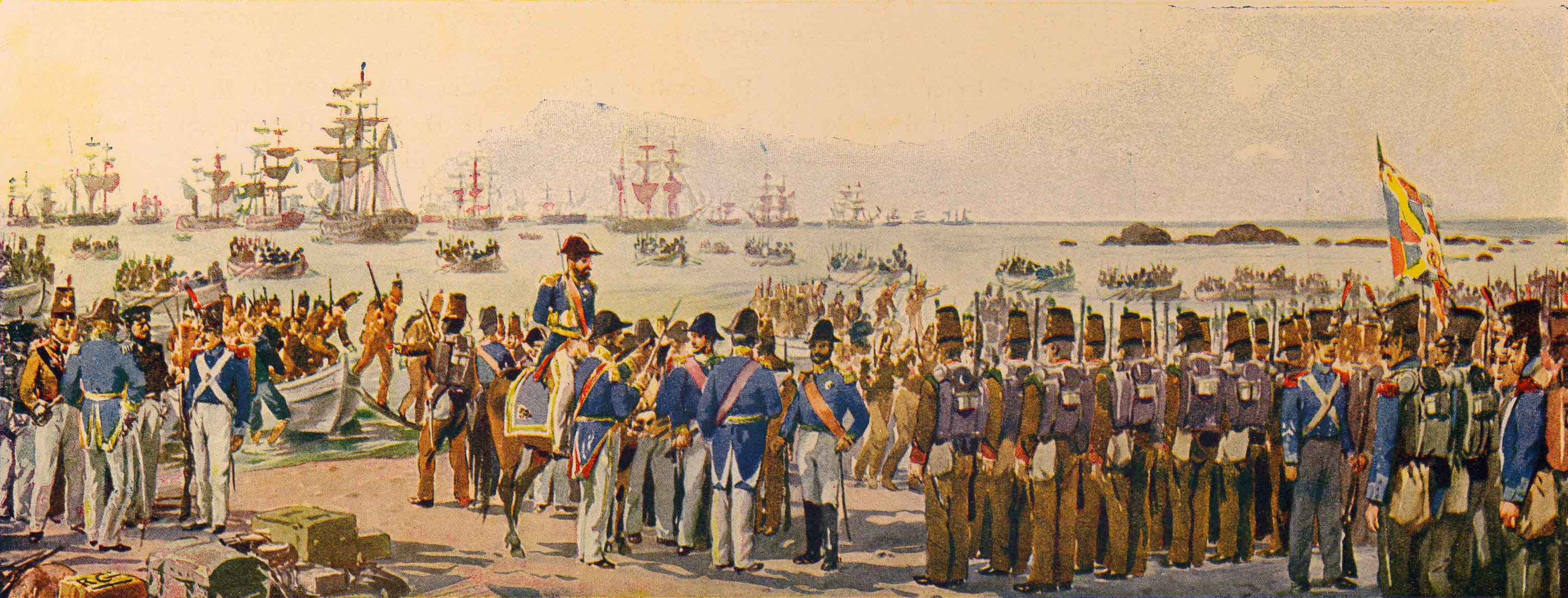
"Landing of the Liberals in Porto"

=== Lisboa Velha, 1925 ===
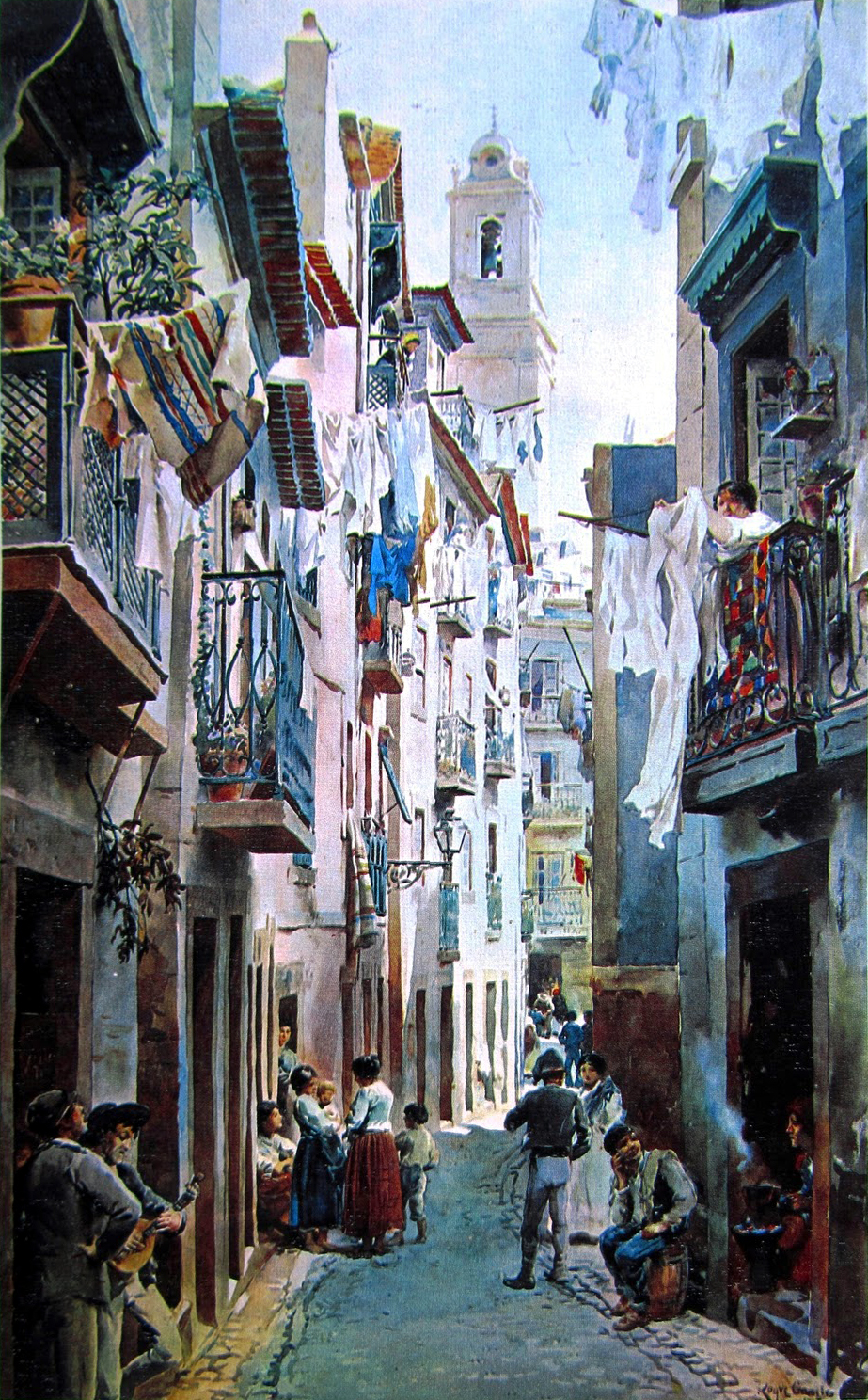
Rua de São Miguel in Alfama (from Lisboa Velha)

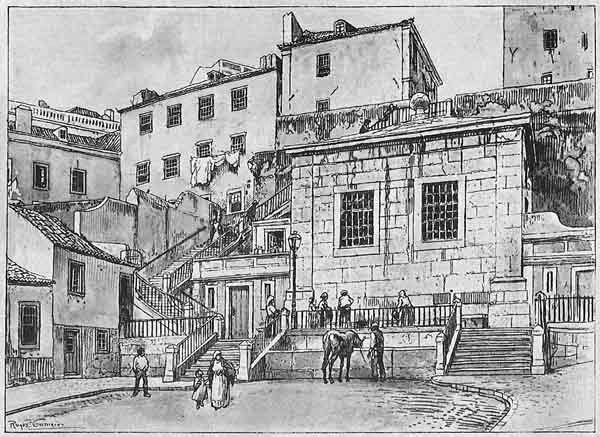
"Chafariz da Alegria"

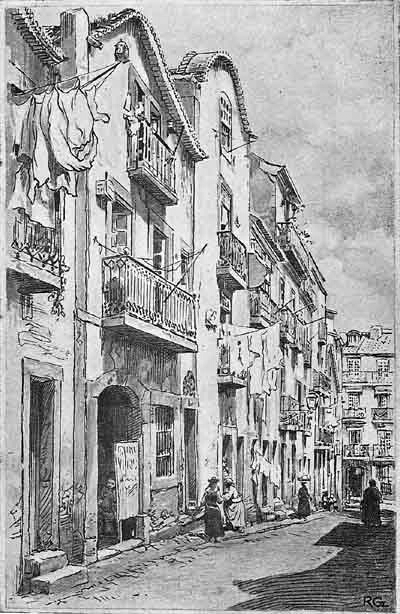
"Rua das Madres"

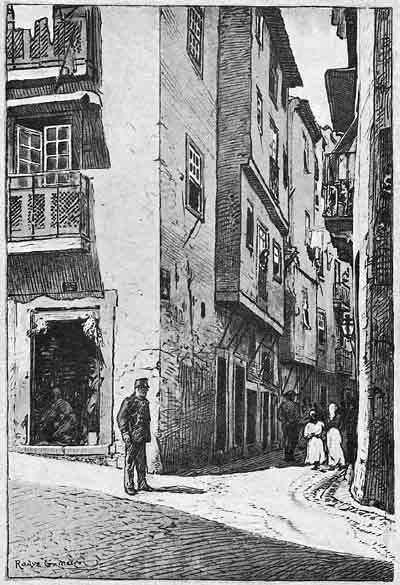
"Entrada da Rua de S. Miguel"

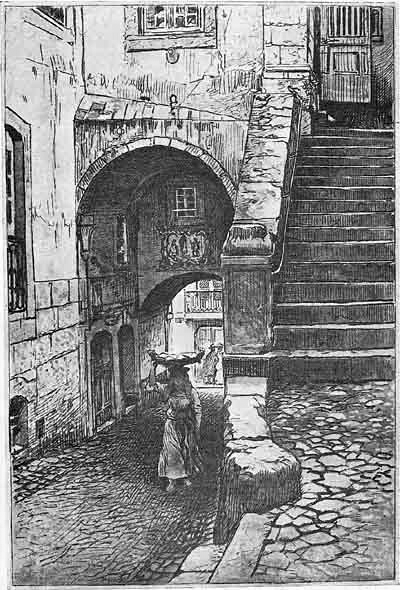
"O Arco Escuro"

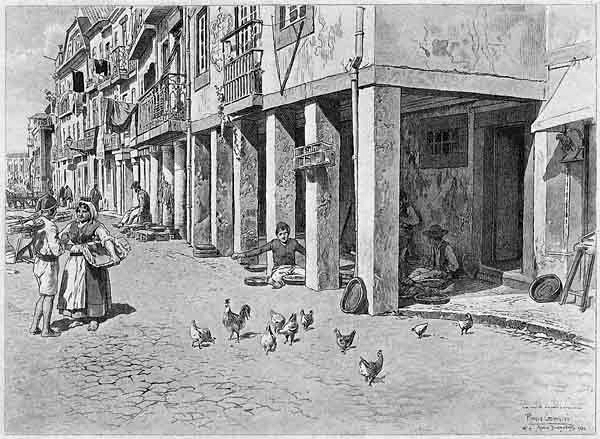
"Vieira Portuense Street"

=== História de Portugal Popular e Ilustrada ===
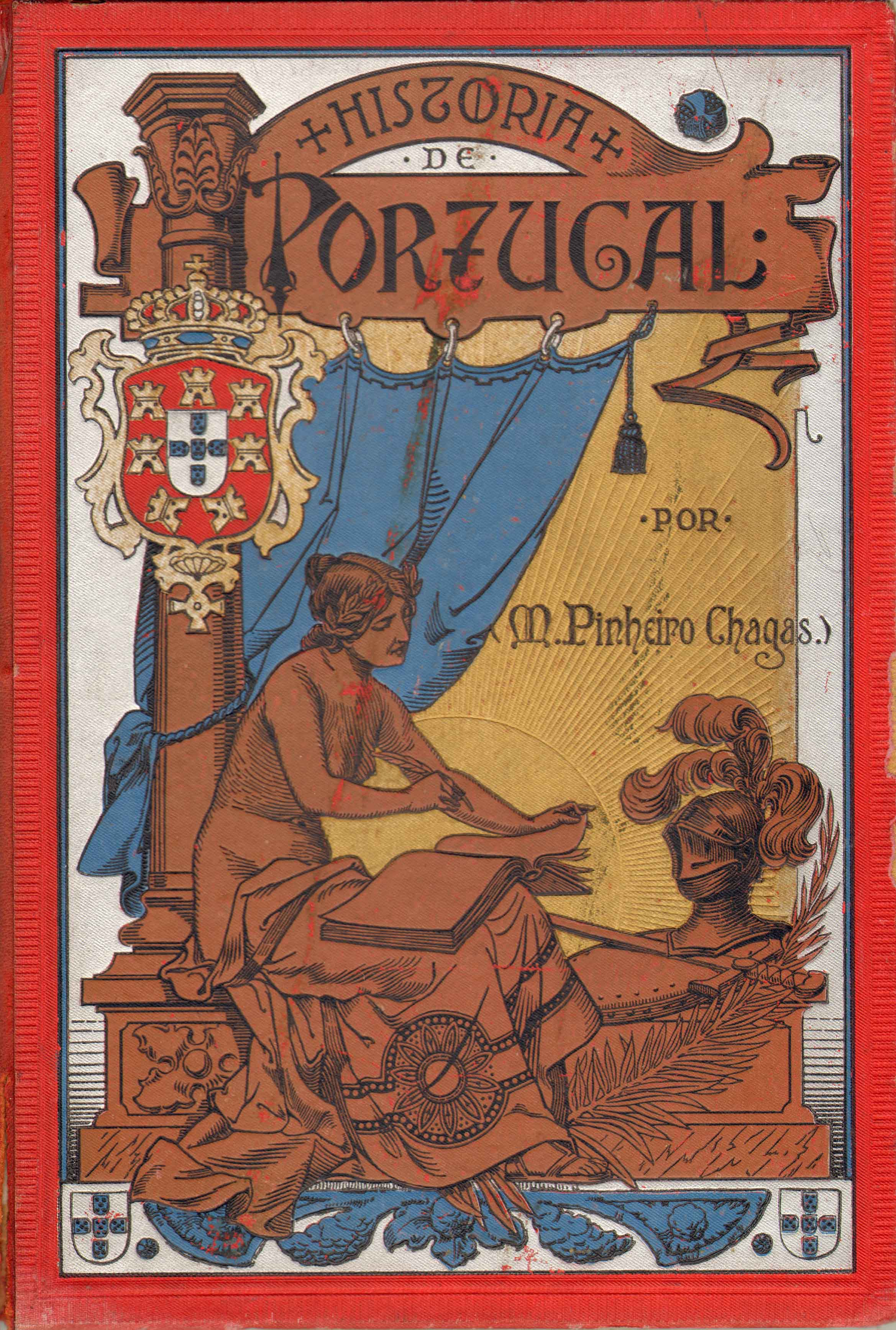
"Popular History of Portugal Illustrated"

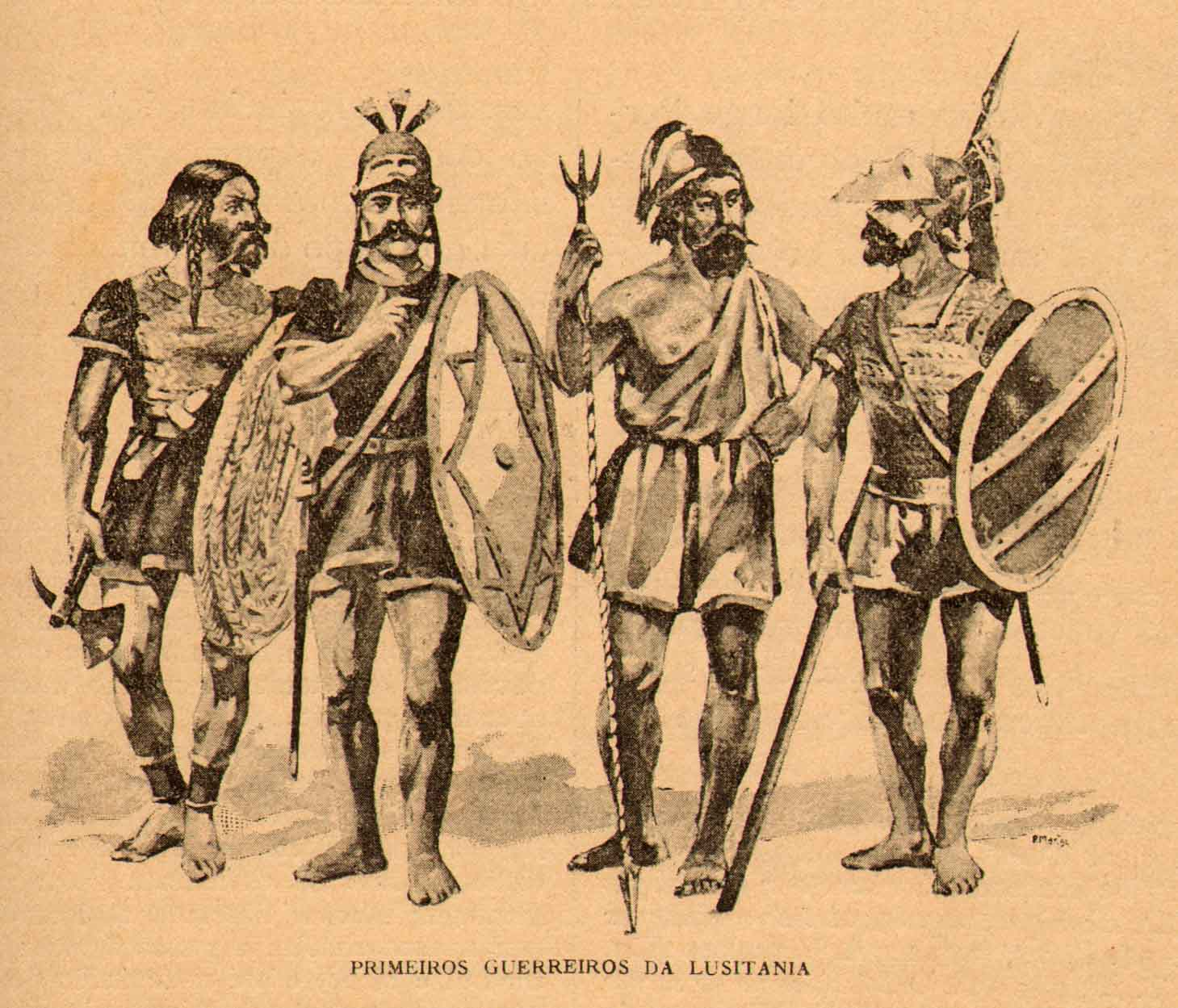
"First Warriors of Lusitania"

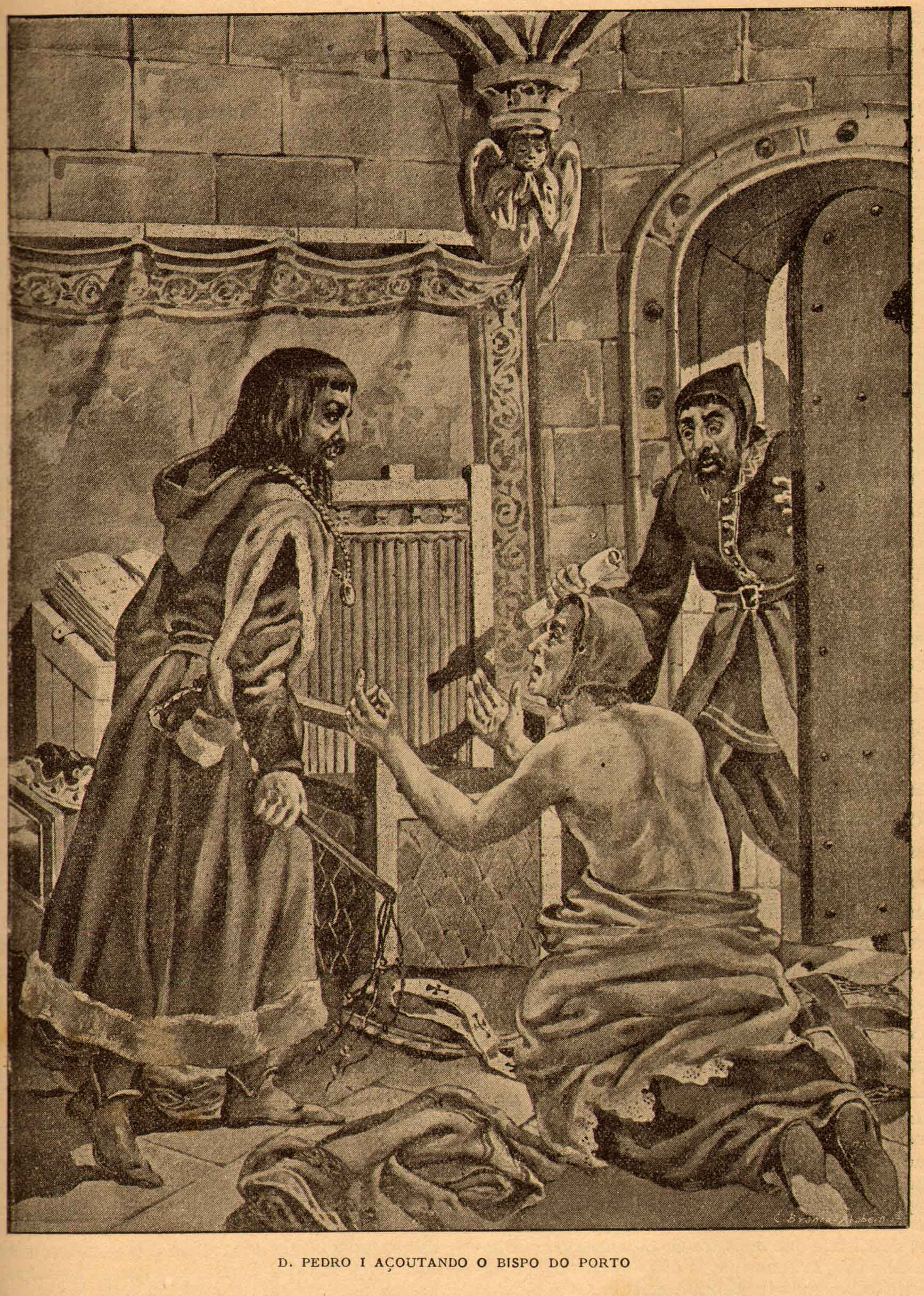
"Dom Pedro Whipping the Bishop of Porto"

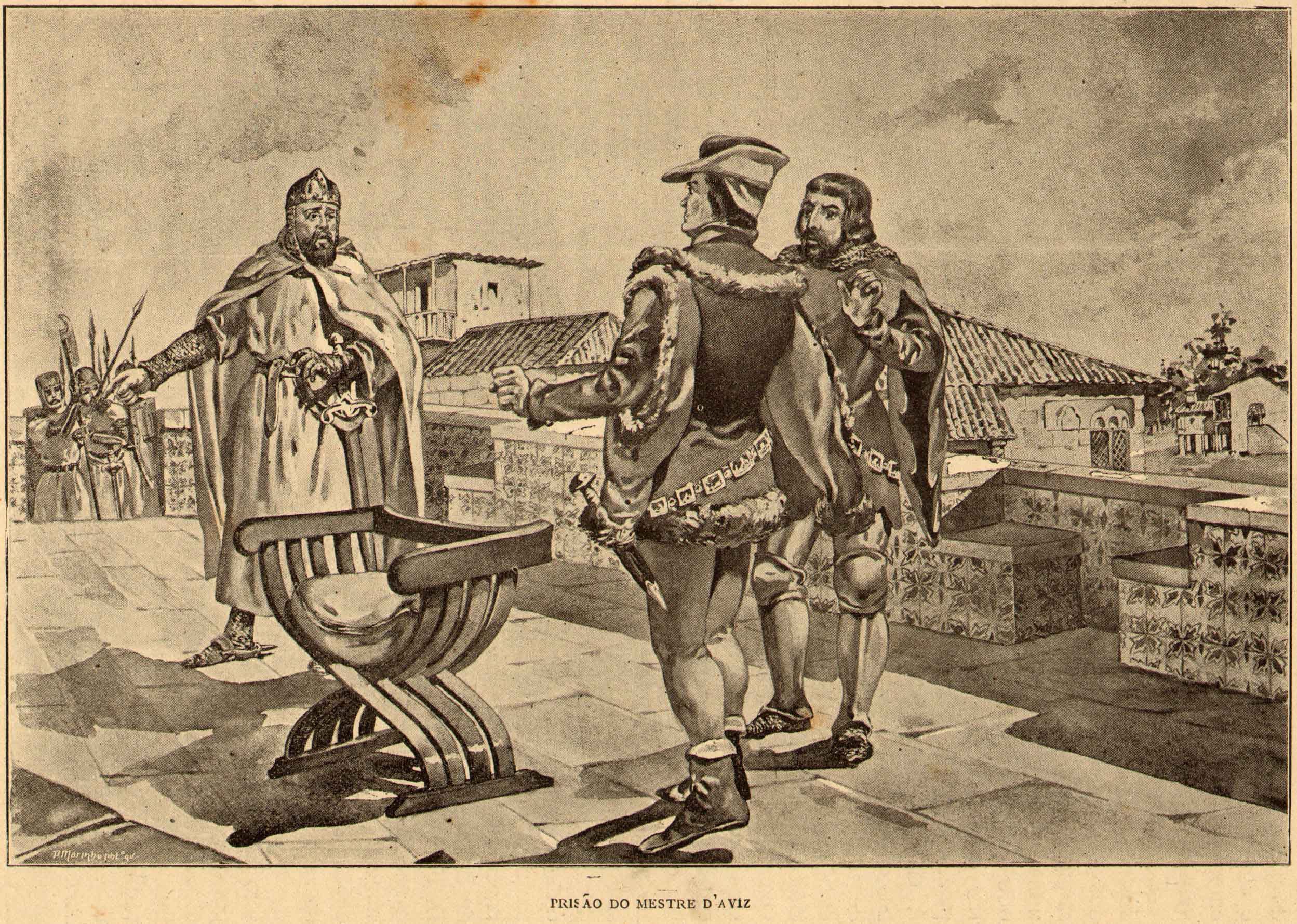
"Imprisonment of the Master of Aviz"

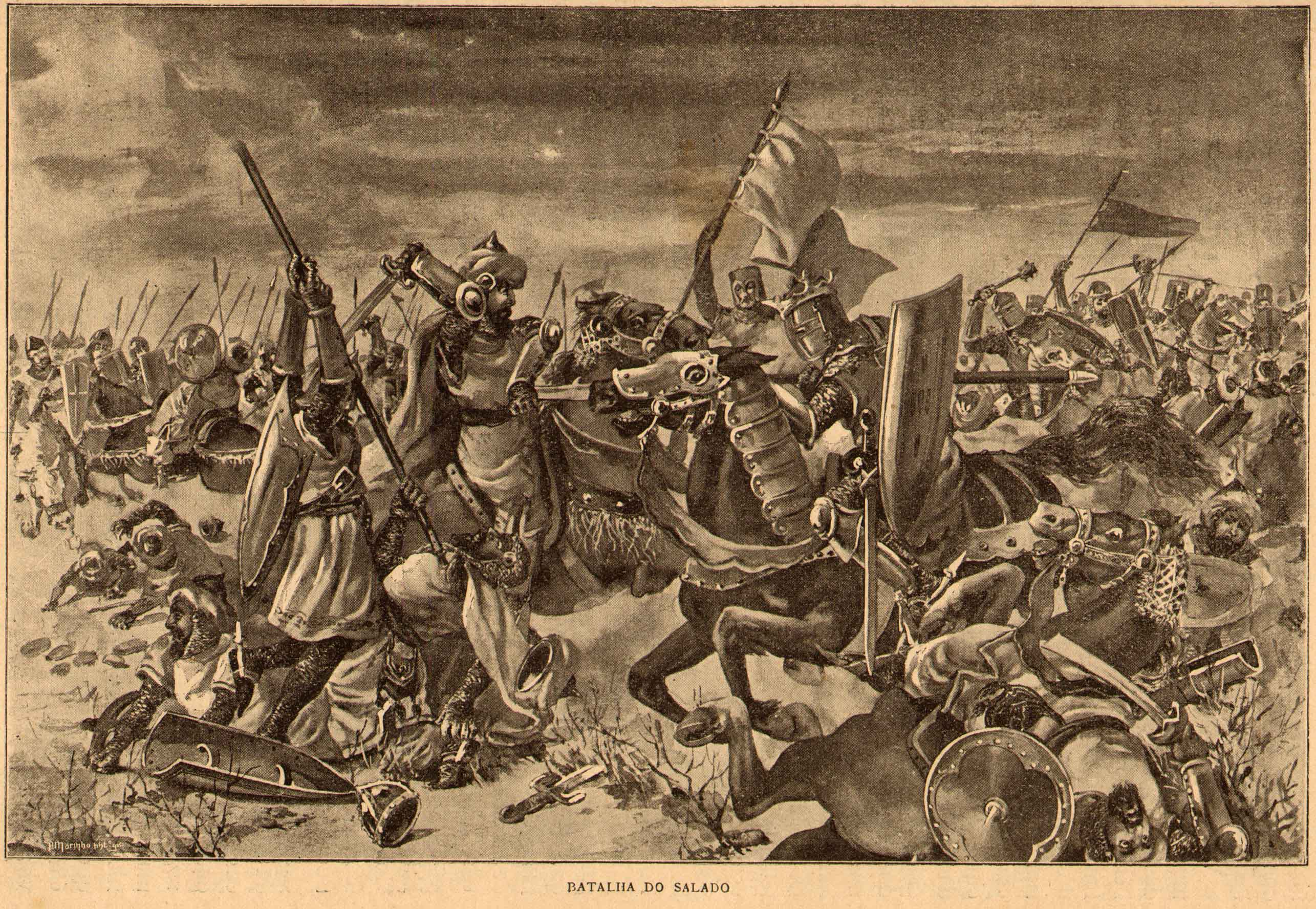
"Battle of Salado"

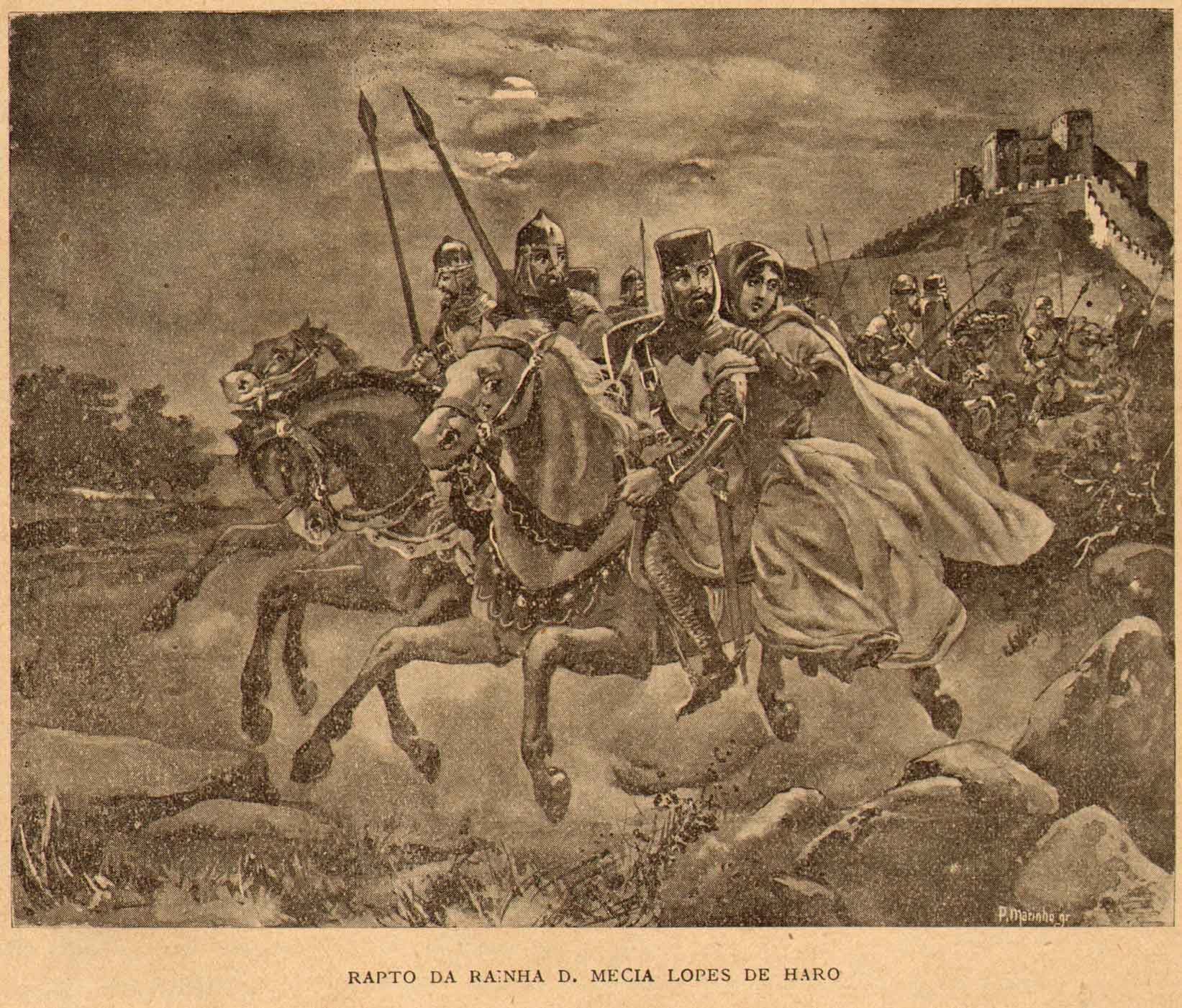
"Kidnap of the Queen Dona Mécia Lopes de Haro"

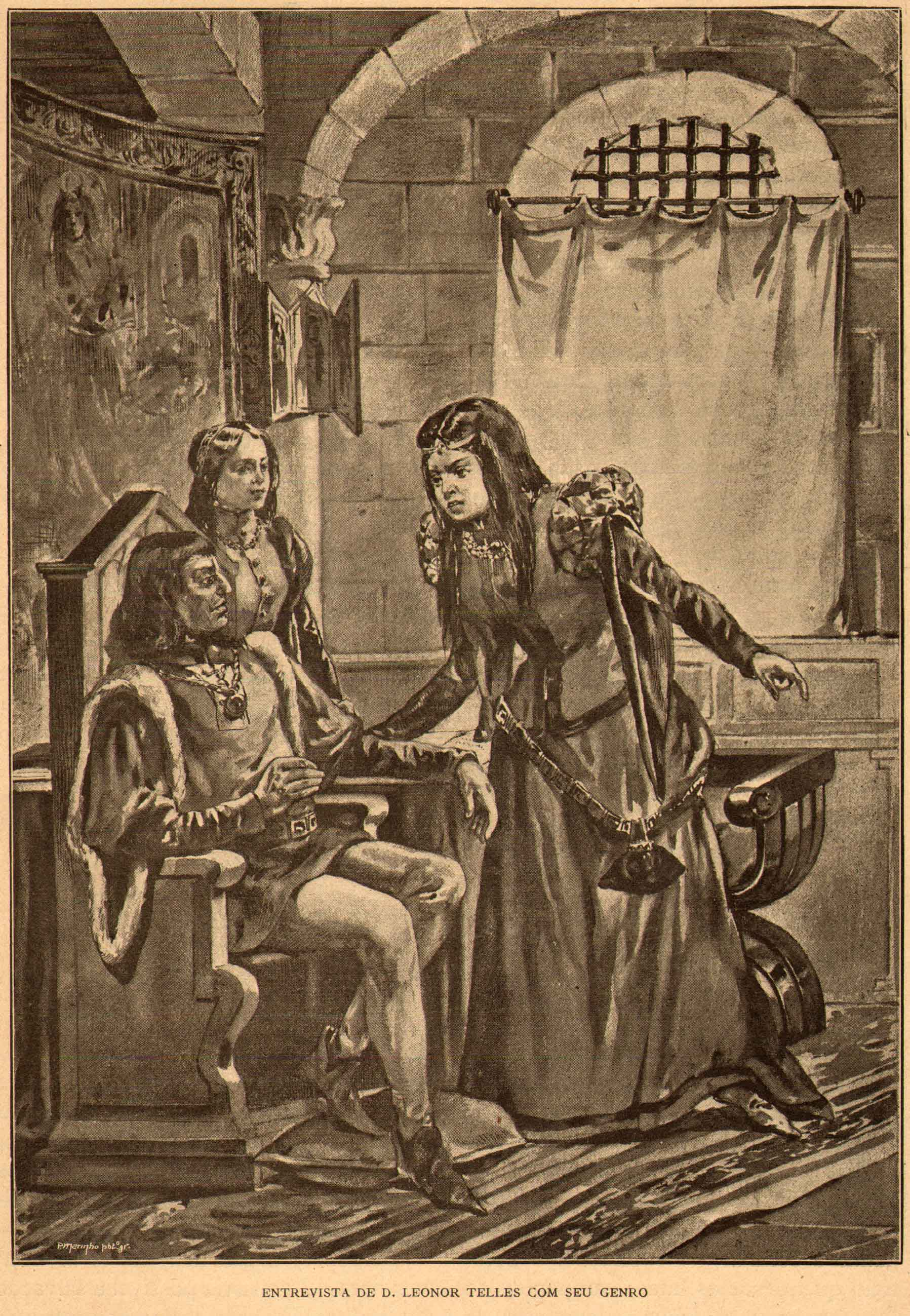
"Interview of Dona Leonor Teles"

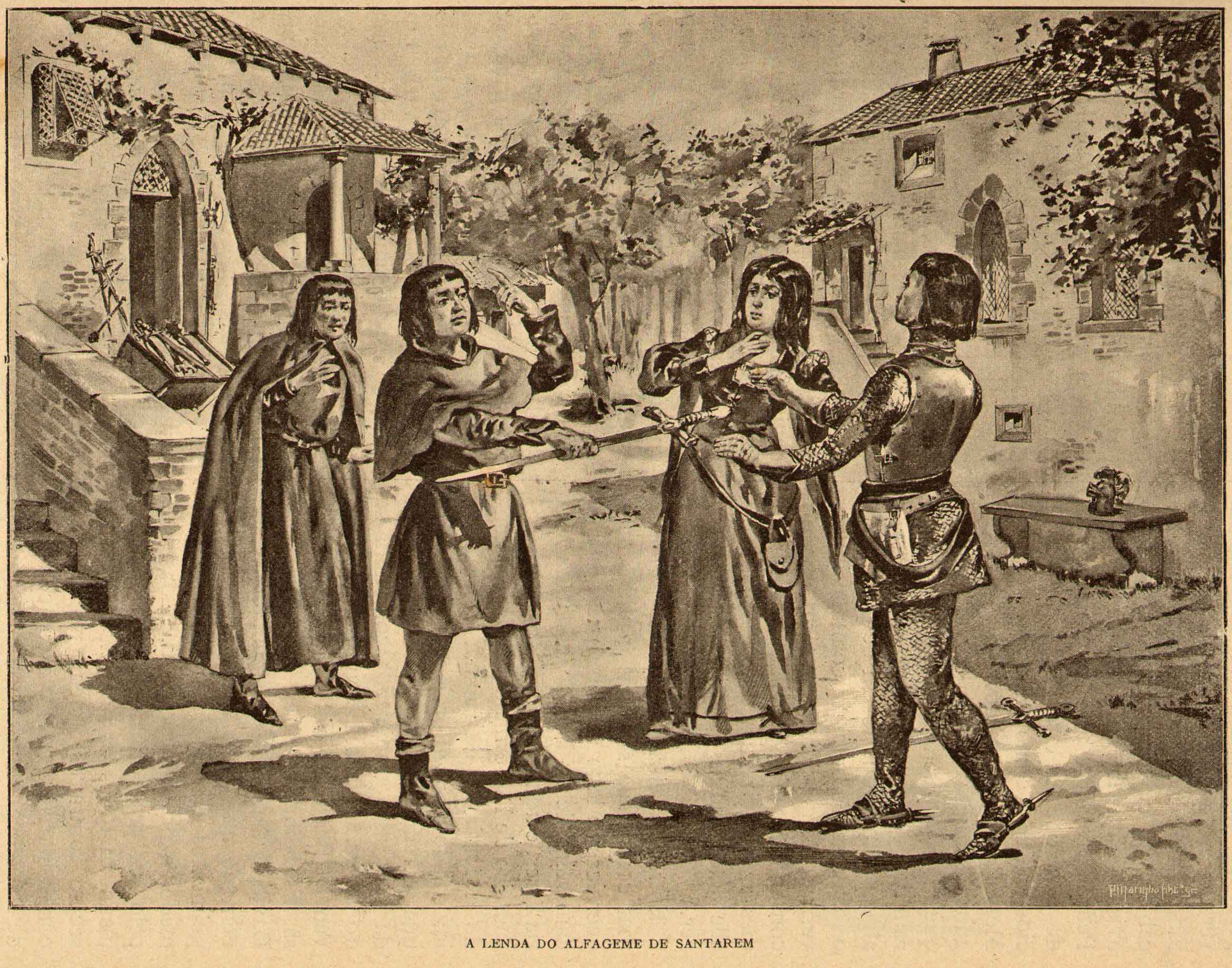
"The Legend of the Alfageme of Santarém"

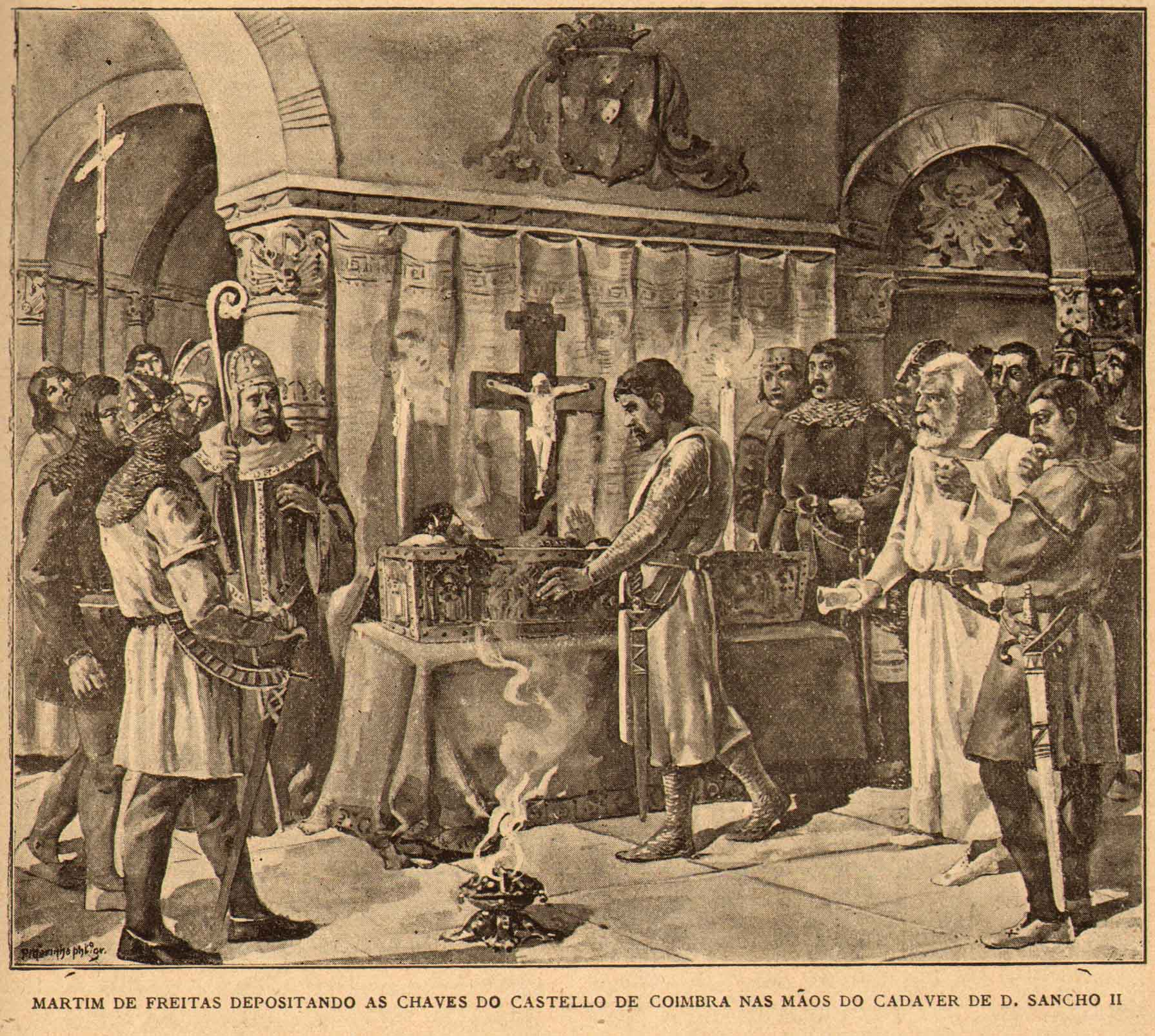
"Martim de Freitas Depositing the Keys to the Castle of Coimbra in the Hands of the Corpse of King Dom Sancho II"

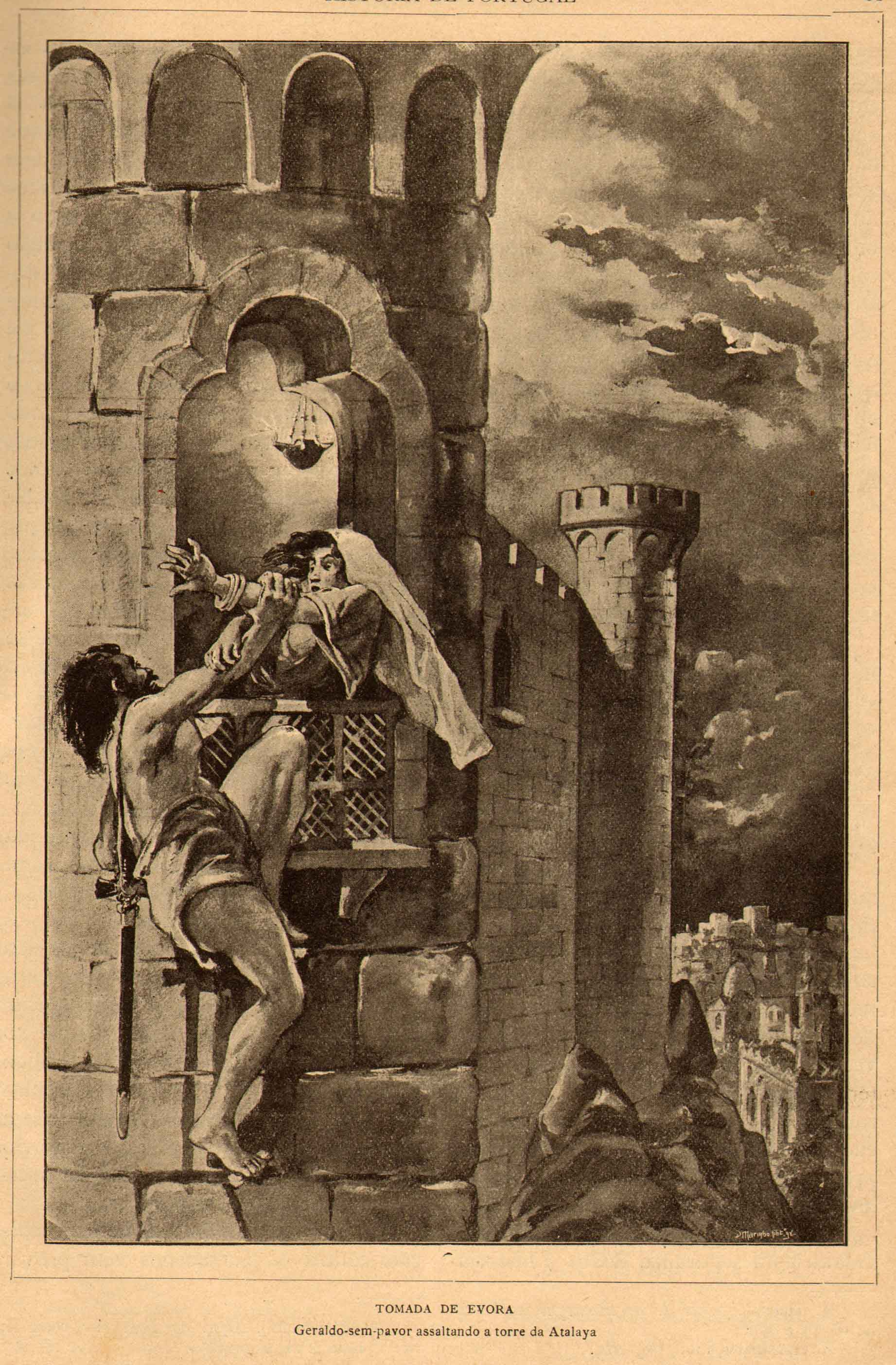
"Taking of Évora, Geraldo the Fearless Storming the Keep".

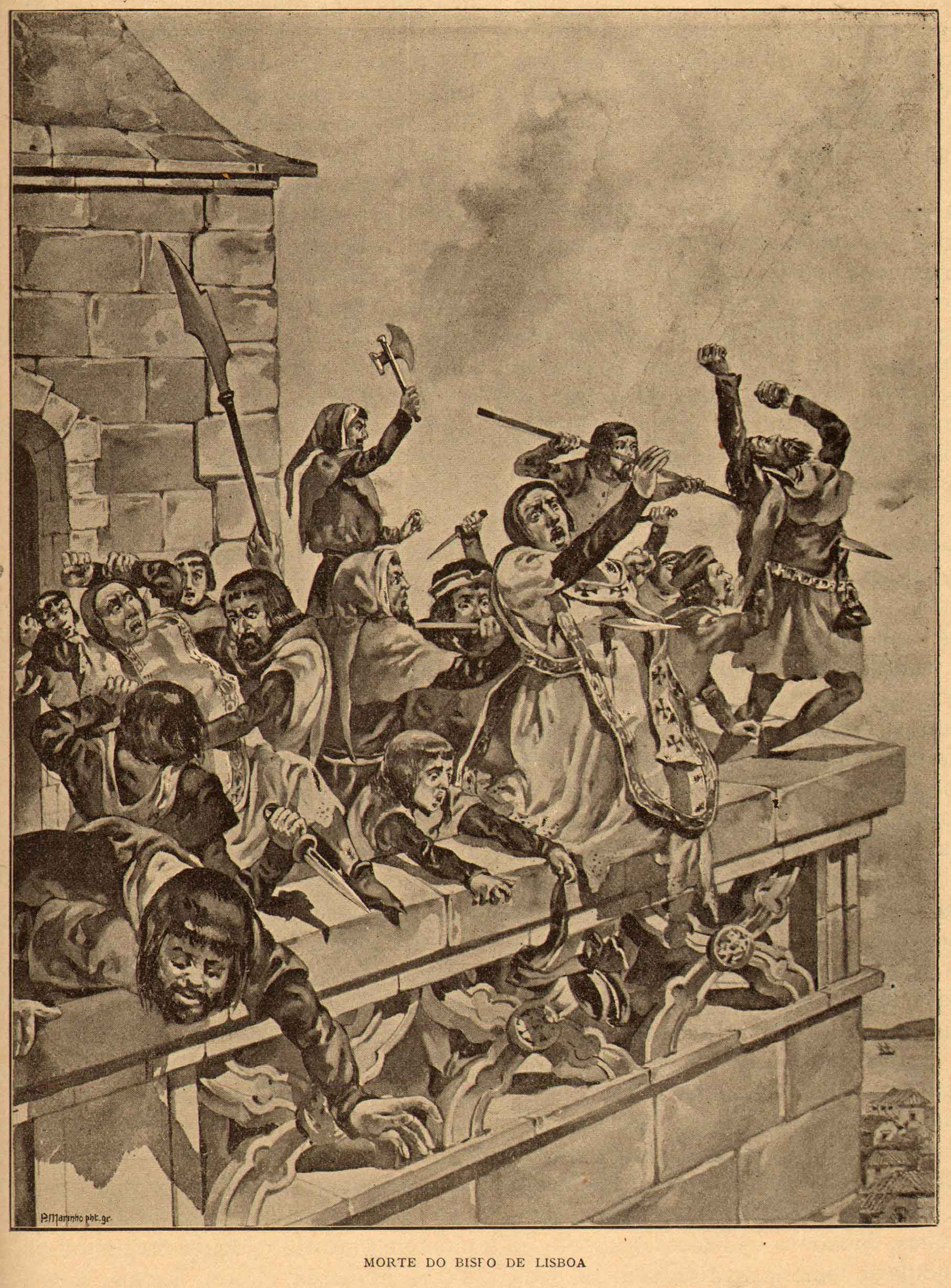
"Death of the Bishop of Lisbon"

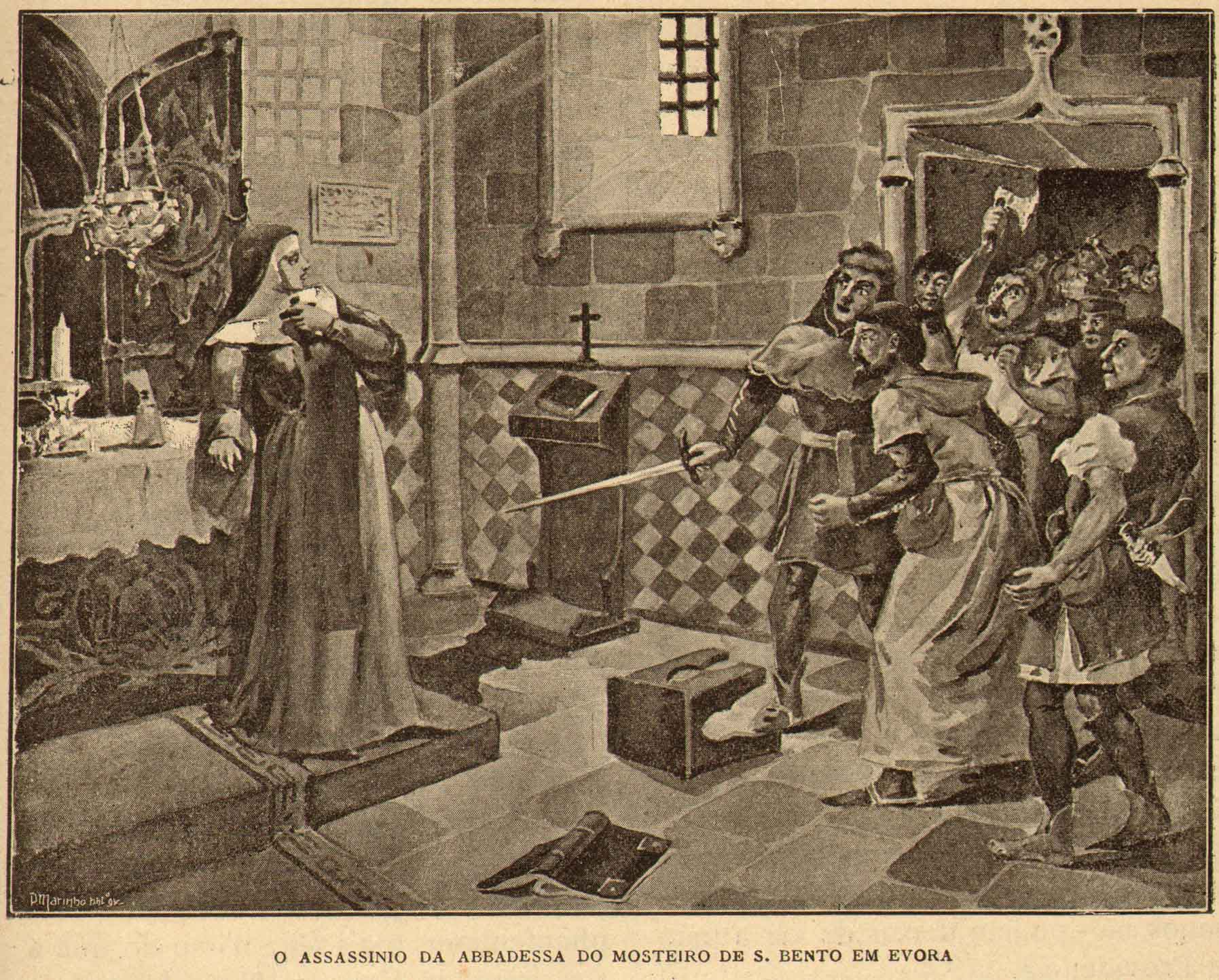
"Death of the Abadess of the Monastery of Saint Benedict in Évora"

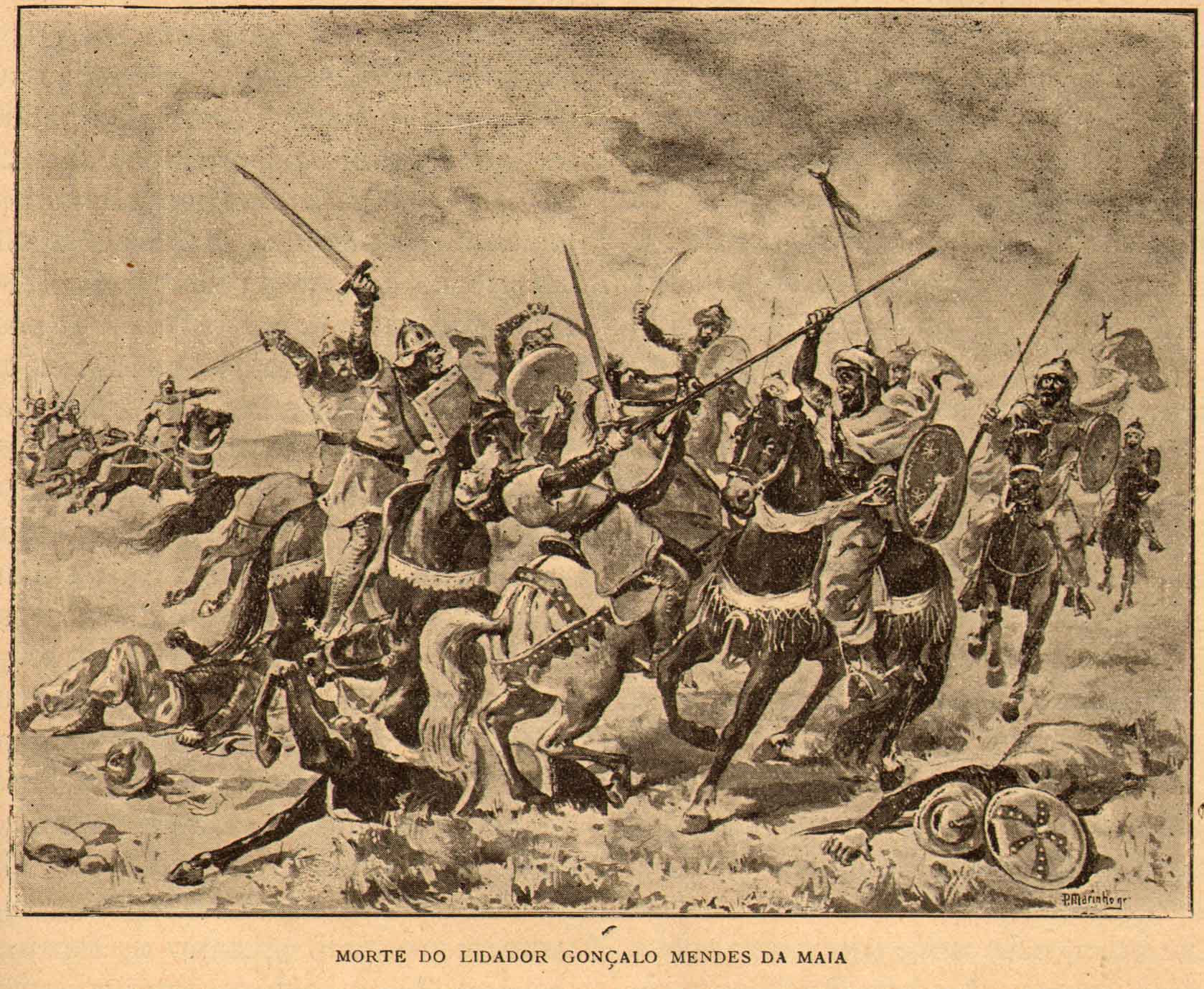
"Death of Gonçalo Mendes da Maia"

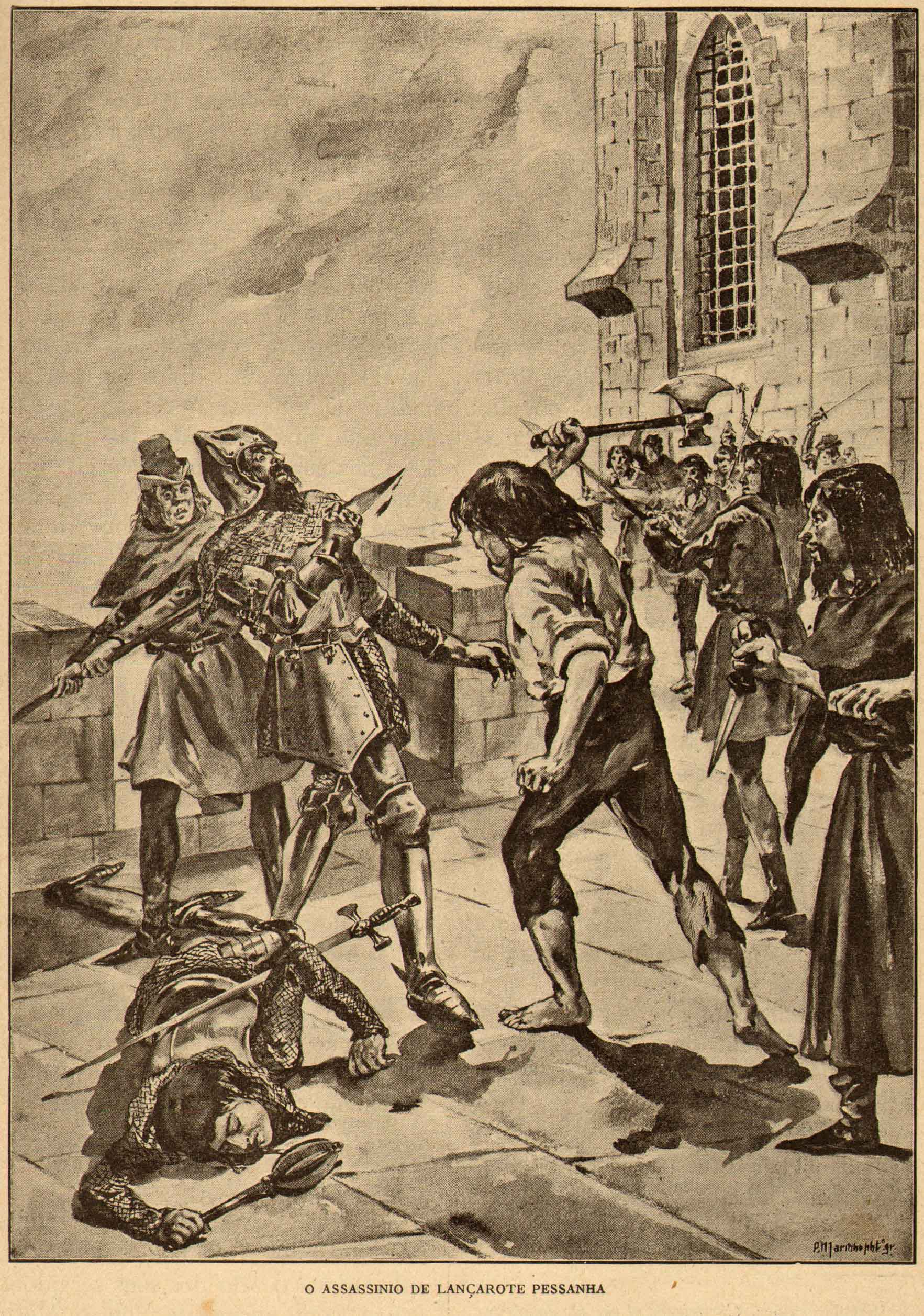
"Murder of Lançarote Pessanha"

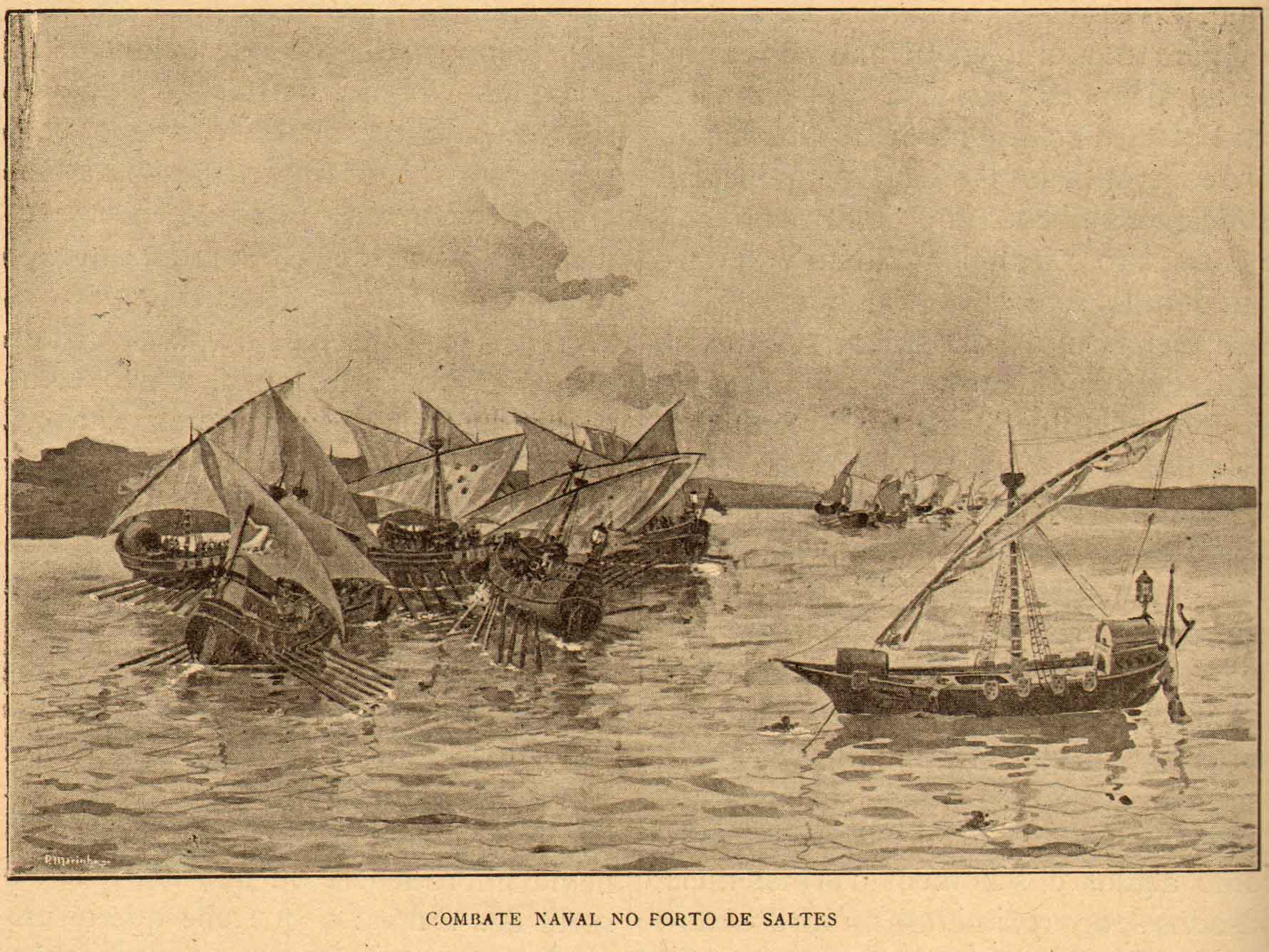
"Naval Combat in the Harbour of Saltes"

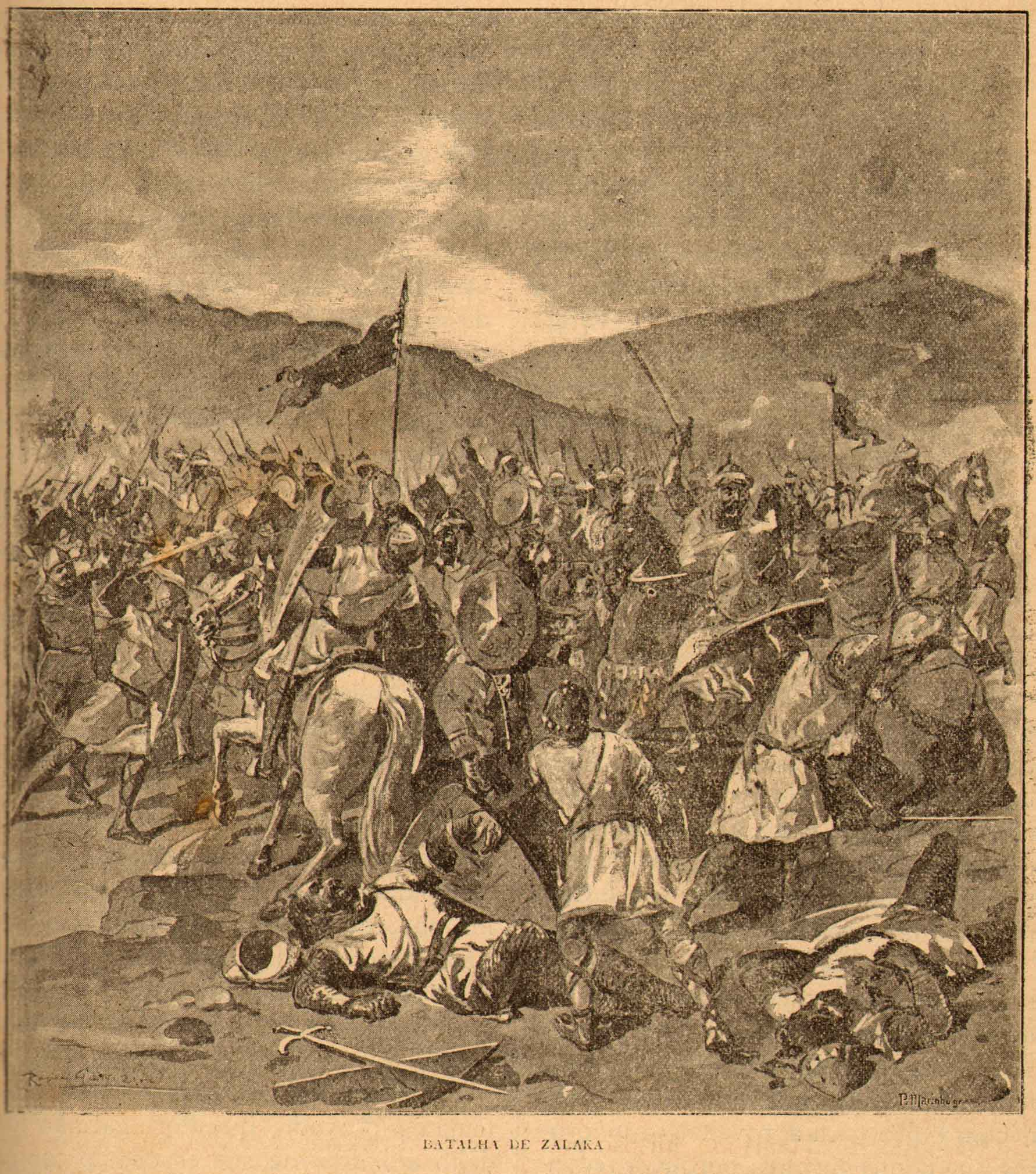
"Battle of Zalaca"
