= Ruy Roque Gameiro =

Portuguese sculptor (1906–1935)

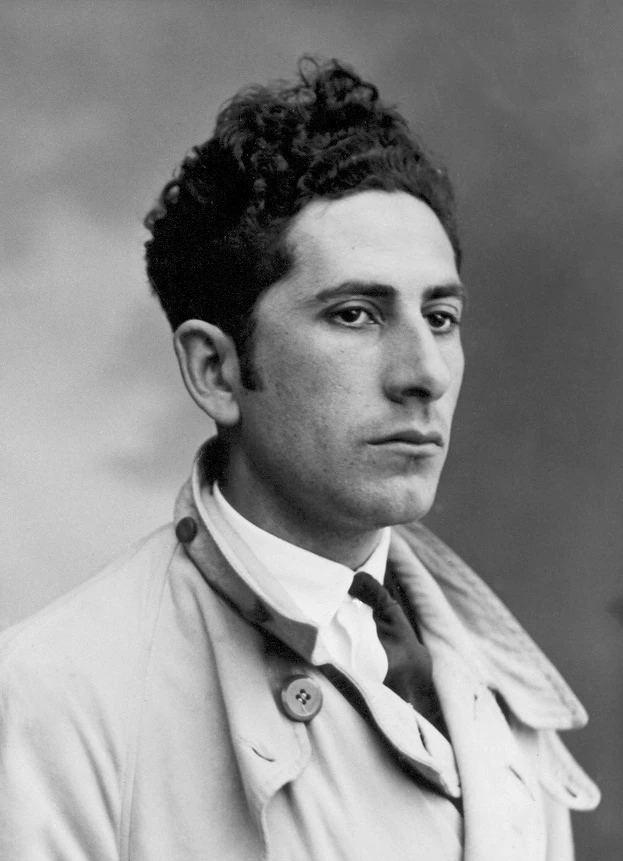
- Born: 27 February 1906
- Died: 18 August 1935 (aged 29); Sintra Road
- Education: Marqués de Pombal Industrial School
- Known for: Sculptor
- Spouse: María Elena Castelo Branco

Ruy Roque Gameiro (27 February 1906 – 18 August 1935) was a Portuguese sculptor. Although he died relatively young, he won the admiration of critics, particularly José de Figueiredo, and earned himself a notable place amongst second-generation Portuguese modernists.

== Background ==
Roque Gameiro was born in his family residence situated on a farm (Venteira) that belonged at the time to the parish of Benfica and the municipality of Oeiras.

He was born to watercolour artist Alfredo Roque Gameiro and mother Maria da Assunção de Carvalho Forte. His siblings Raquel (also his godmother), Manuel, Helena, and Maria were all also artists. He was an apprentice of José Simões de Almeida (nephew), and attended auto-mechanic classes at the Marqués de Pombal Industrial School in Lisbon, at that time directed by Sanches de Castro.

In 1928, he graduated from the School of Fine Arts of Lisbon, with a sculpture titled Cain and Abel. The following year, he exhibited his art for the first time at the National Society of Fine Arts (Sociedade Nacional de Belas Artes), with his sculpture Salomé and the sculpted head of the painter José Tagarro. The latter was acquired for the National Museum of Contemporary Art.

Amongst his most notable sculptures are the monuments he created in memory of World War I, located in Abrantes and Lourenco Marques (Maputo). Completed in 1930, the Abrantes statue was the first in Portugal to be made of concrete. The Maputo statue, made in collaboration with architect Veloso Reis, was exhibited in 1943 at the Avenida da Liberdade in Lisboa, and was gifted to the city the next year. The unusual, imposing energy of these works, especially the personification of the motherland in fitted garments, highlights them as one of the most remarkable national sculptures of the time.

In 1932, his statue of Don Juan II once again was chosen by the city, and was erected on Avenida da India, in Lisbon. This statue also appeared at the 1932 Paris Worlds Fair and the 1939 New York Worlds Fair.

On May 26, 1933, he married María Elena Castelo Branco (member of the parish in Oeiras), daughter of Vasco Sampaio Castelo Branco, the director of the Refinaria colonial, and daughter of Ana Luisa Sampaio Castelo Branco.

He and his wife Maria Elena both died on August 18, 1935, in a car accident in which their motorcycle collided with a car. His premature death at 29 years old "stopped him from creating a work that, judging by the small splash he made, would certainly be defining of his generation."
