= Emília de Sousa Costa =

Portuguese educator, writer, and feminist

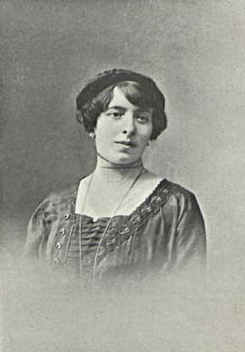
- Photo taken in 1914
- Born: Emília da Piedade Teixeira Lopes; 15 December 1877; Lamego, Viseu district, Portugal
- Died: 6 July 1959 (Aged 81); Porto
- Other name: Emília da Piedade Teixeira Lopes de Sousa Costa
- Occupations: Writer and teacher
- Known for: Children’s literature

Emília de Sousa Costa (1877–1959) was a teacher who promoted female education, a writer of novels for both adults and children and a feminist. She is considered a pioneer of children's literature in the Portuguese language and also translated several stories by the Brothers Grimm into Portuguese.

== Early life ==
Emília da Piedade Teixeira Lopes de Sousa Costa was born in Lamego in the Viseu district of northern Portugal on 15 December 1877, to Colonel Luís Maria Teixeira Lopes and Maria do Pilar Pinto Cardoso. On 5 October 1904, she married the writer Alberto de Sousa Costa. They had three children, one of whom died at an early age. After marrying, they lived in Coimbra, where her husband completed his degree at the University of Coimbra, before moving to the Portuguese capital of Lisbon, where they were to remain until 1932, later moving to Porto. Emília de Sousa Costa was an early advocate for female education and one of the founders of the Caixa de Auxílio aos Estudantes Pobres do Sexo Feminino (Aid fund for poor female students). In 1911, her husband was involved with the formation of the Refúgio da Tutoria da Infância, which provided for the temporary reception of delinquent or abandoned children. She was a teacher at the Tutoria Central of Lisbon and was a member of the central council of the National Federation of Friends of Children.

== Writing ==
Until recently the writing of Sousa Costa has tended to be forgotten, and she has been known primarily for her educational activities. However, there has recently been a re-evaluation of her written work, notably by Maria Regina Tavares da Silva and Carlos Nogueira. Sousa Costa is generally considered to have represented a form of "moderate feminism", unlike the more radical approach of other earlier feminists such as the writer Ana de Castro Osório and the gynaecologist Adelaide Cabete. She wrote several books on feminist issues, namely The Woman at Home (1916), Early Childhood Education (1923), Old Ideas of the Modern Woman (1923), Look at Malice and the Evil of Women (1932) and The Woman Educator. Nogueira points out that in these and many other of her books Sousa Costa expresses a moderate feminism that is patriotic and devout. Her writings celebrate a modern woman who is educated and free but, at the same time, most likely devoted to her roles of wife, mother and educator. Sousa Costa was a feminist through her writings and speeches but not by joining feminist organizations, which she avoided. However, she did not refrain from implicit criticism of the prevailing Estado Novo regime that came to power in 1926.

Sousa Costa was responsible for the publication of a collection of books for children, published as the Biblioteca dos Pequeninos (Children's Library) by the publishing company of the Diário de Notícias newspaper. Her children's books were included in the series, with many being illustrated by Raquel Gameiro. As a translator of the Grimms' Fairy Tales she used the synonym of Maria Valverde. In 1925, she published her only travel diary, entitled Como eu vi o Brasil (As I saw Brazil), based on a trip made to that country in 1923. In 1935, she published a book of stories of a historical character, entitled Lendas de Portugal. The work presents 26 short stories about Portuguese legends.

== Later years ==
In her last years, Sousa Costa and her husband lived in the house in Porto known as the Conventinho de Contumil, where she died on 6 July 1959.

== Awards and honours ==
- Emília de Sousa Costa was awarded the Portuguese Military Order of Saint James of the Sword.
- On October 5, 2010, in commemoration of the centenary of the Portuguese Republic, postage stamps were issued in honour of women who, at the beginning of the 20th century, made great social, cultural or political contributions to the defence of women's rights. One of the stamps was dedicated to Sousa Costa.
- There is a street named after her in São João da Pesqueira in the Viseu district.

== Children's books ==
A selection of books for children written by Sousa Costa.

- 1927 Contos do Joãozinho
- 1927 O Perú Aviador
- 1928 História do Menino Jesus
- 1928 Os Contos do Joãozinho (part 2)
- 1930 História da Feialinda
- 1931 Contos dos meus netinhos
- 1932 Joanito africanista
- 1933 Quem tiver filhas no Mundo
- 1933 No Reino do Sol
- 1933 Tagaté - Ás do Futebol
- 1934 Triste Vida a da Raposa
- 1938 Mestre Burro em Calças Pardas
- 1950 Joanito Africanista
