= Raquel Gameiro =

Portuguese illustrator (1889–1970)

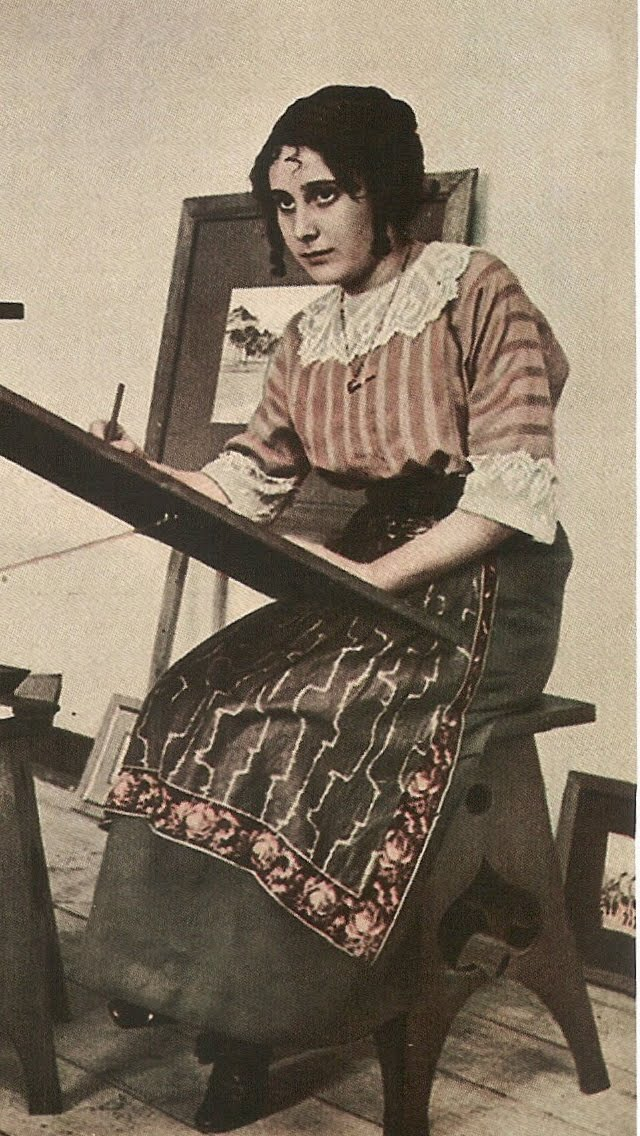
Raquel Roque Gameiro from lustração Portuguesa (1911)

Raquel Roque Gameiro Ottolini (1889–1970) was a prominent Portuguese illustrator and watercolourist. She exhibited her paintings at Lisbon's Sociedade Nacional de Belas-Artes from 1909, receiving the SNBA watercolour medal in 1929. Gameiro illustrated numerous books, newspapers and magazines, including Diário de Notícias and O Século.

== Biography ==
Born on 15 August 1889 in Lisbon, Raquel Roque Gameiro was the eldest child of the painter Alfredo Roque Gameiro (1864–1935) and Maria da Assunção de Carvalho Forte. She was brought up in the Amadora district of Lisbon, together with her brother Manuel and her sisters Helena and Maria Emília, She was educated at home where together with her siblings her father introduced her to painting. Drawing from the age of seven, when she was 15 she contributed illustrations to Ana de Castro Osório's children's collection Para as Crianças. In 1911, she married Jorge Gomes Ottolini (1889–1955), the Fourth Count of Ottolini, with whom she had three daughters, including the illustrator Guida Ottolini, and one son. They first lived in the family home in Amadora but later moved to the Benfica district of Lisbon.

Gameiro exhibited at the SNBA from 1909 to 1937, painting colourful works depicting fishermen and peasants as well as rustic interiors. After taking care of her family for an extended period, in the 1920s Gameiro returned to professional work, illustrating mainly children's literature by authors including Agostinho de Campos, António Sérgio, Emília de Sousa Costa, Francisco José da Rocha Martins, Manuel Rodrigues Lapa and Sara Beirão. She also illustrated school books such as Livro de Leitura para a 1.ª Classe (1932). She also made illustrations for several newspapers and magazines, including ABCzinho, Joaninha, Ilustração Portuguesa, Jornal dos Pequeninos, Modas e Bordados, O Mosquito, and Portugal Feminino.

Together with her father, Gameiro also made caricatures of local personalities, which contributed to a humorous collection.

Raquel Gameiro died in Lisbon on 3 October 1970.
