= José Malhoa Museum =

Museum in Caldas da Rainha, Portugal

Coordinates: 39.4008°N 9.1340°W

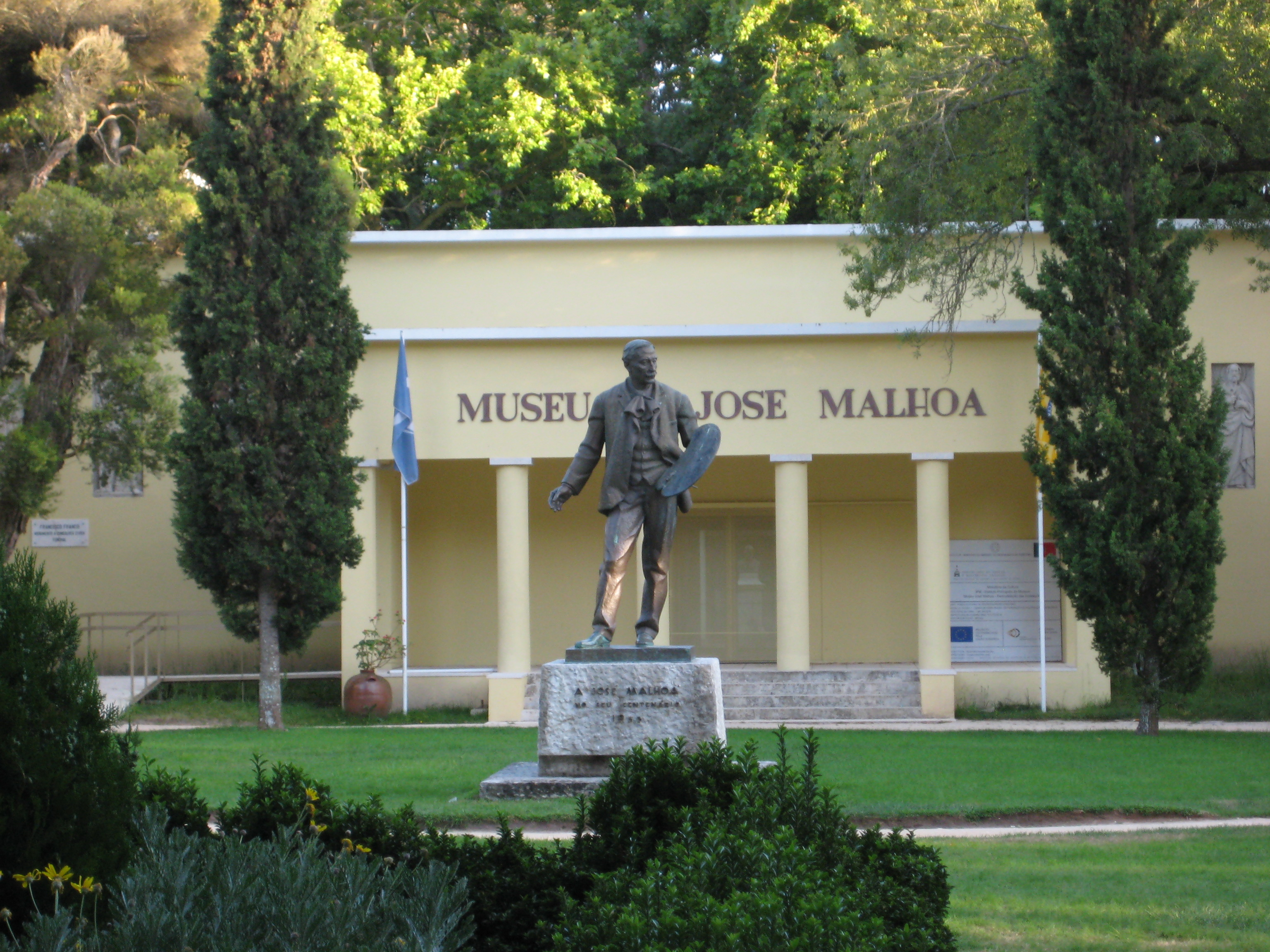
Museu de José Malhoa, with a statue of the museum's namesake in the foreground

The Museu de José Malhoa (José Malhoa Museum), Caldas da Rainha, is a regional museum in the Portuguese Estremadura province, that hosts the finest collection of the Portuguese naturalist painter José Malhoa. The museum building, the first purpose-built museum in Portugal, was constructed in 1940 and enlarged in 1950 and 1957. The museum's collection includes paintings, sculptures, medals, drawings and ceramics from the 19th and 20th centuries.

== Localization ==
The museum is located in the city of Caldas da Rainha, Leiria, Portugal, in the middle of the D. Carlos I park.

== See also ==
- List of single-artist museums
