= Balsemão River =

Coordinates: 41°00′12″N 7°55′48″W

Balsemão
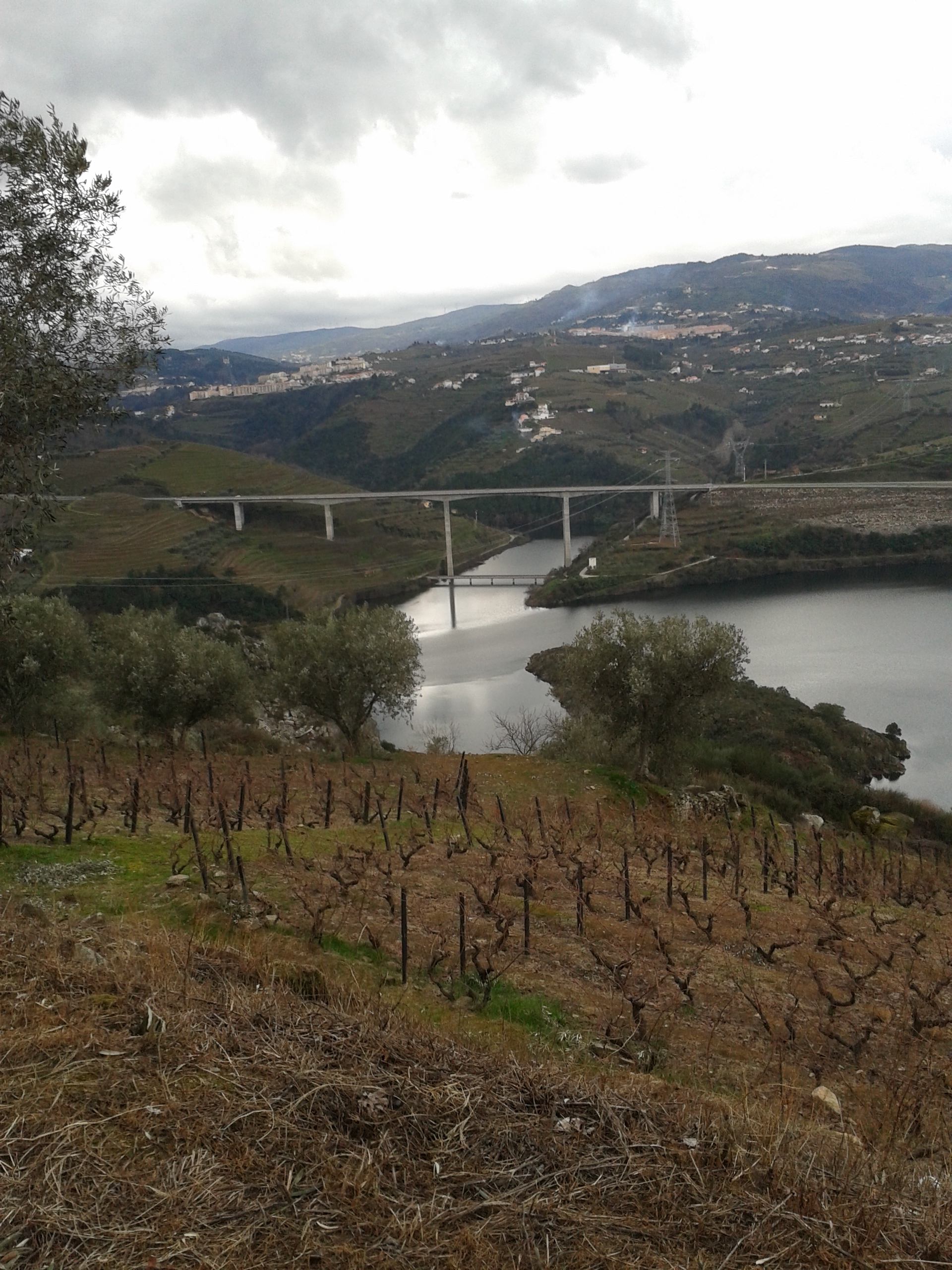
- Balsemão River mouth

Location
- Country: Portugal
- Location: Viseu District

Physical characteristics
- Source
  - location: Serra de Montemuro
  - elevation: 1,352 m (4,436 ft)
- Mouth
  - location: Varosa River
- Length: 32.4 km (20.1 mi)

Basin features
- EU Surface Water Body Codes: PT03DOU0391; PT03DOU0421

The Rio Balsemão (European Portuguese pronunciation: [ˈʁi.u βalsɨˈmɐ̃w]) or Balsemão River is a small stream that originates in the mountain range of Serra de Montemuro. It passes through narrow canyons before it reaches the major city Lamego.

Part of the Douro basin, its entire path is made in the old district of Viseu. Born near Rossão, Gosende, in the municipality of Castro Daire, it still draws, for short while, the frontier with neighbors Resende and Lamego before heading on through this last municipality, towards the Douro Valley.

The Balsemão River has a dam near Pretarouca, Lamego.

Nearby Magueija, in a small canyon of Balsemão was detected an extremely localized forest dominated by Elm (Ulmus glabra) and Narrow-leafed Ash (Fraxinus angustifolia).

Along with watermills, its possible to find in the margins of the Balsemão River the so-called “leiras” (narrow green stretches of cultivated land).

Near the end of its course, on the right bank, it's possible to find the Chapel of São Pedro de Balsemão, a former Visigothic sanctuary dating back to the 7th century and now a National monument.

Eventually it ends in a storage reservoir made by the Varosa Dam in the Varosa River. The Varosa, in turn, will meet the Douro River near Peso da Régua.

This river has a "Friends of the Balsemão River Association" (Associação de Amigos do Rio Balsemão - ASAMIRB).

== See also ==
Chapel of São Pedro de Balsemão
