= 1807 =

1807 in various calendars
- Gregorian calendar: 1807; MDCCCVII
- Ab urbe condita: 2560
- Armenian calendar: 1256; ԹՎ ՌՄԾԶ
- Assyrian calendar: 6557
- Balinese saka calendar: 1728–1729
- Bengali calendar: 1213–1214
- Berber calendar: 2757
- British Regnal year: 47 Geo. 3 – 48 Geo. 3
- Buddhist calendar: 2351
- Burmese calendar: 1169
- Byzantine calendar: 7315–7316
- Chinese calendar: 丙寅年 (Fire Tiger); 4504 or 4297 — to — 丁卯年 (Fire Rabbit); 4505 or 4298
- Coptic calendar: 1523–1524
- Discordian calendar: 2973
- Ethiopian calendar: 1799–1800
- Hebrew calendar: 5567–5568
- Hindu calendars
- Vikram Samvat: 1863–1864
- Shaka Samvat: 1728–1729
- Kali Yuga: 4907–4908
- Holocene calendar: 11807
- Igbo calendar: 807–808
- Iranian calendar: 1185–1186
- Islamic calendar: 1221–1222
- Japanese calendar: Bunka 4 (文化４年)
- Javanese calendar: 1733–1734
- Julian calendar: Gregorian minus 12 days
- Korean calendar: 4140
- Minguo calendar: 105 before ROC 民前105年
- Nanakshahi calendar: 339
- Thai solar calendar: 2349–2350
- Tibetan calendar: མེ་ཕོ་སྟག་ལོ་ (male Fire-Tiger); 1933 or 1552 or 780 — to — མེ་མོ་ཡོས་ལོ་ (female Fire-Hare); 1934 or 1553 or 781

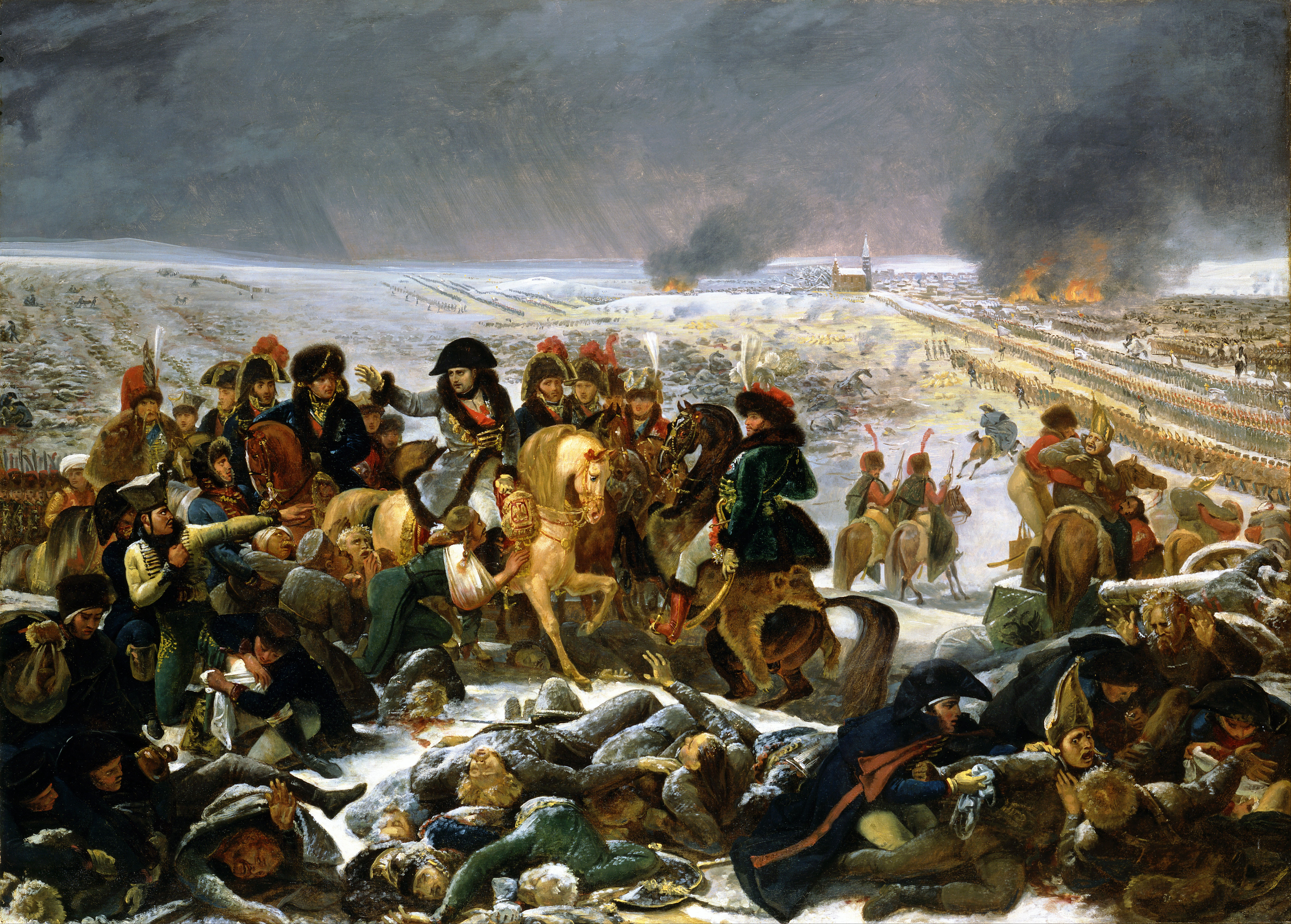
February 7: Napoleon leads French troops into Russia in winter, and fights the Battle of Eylau.

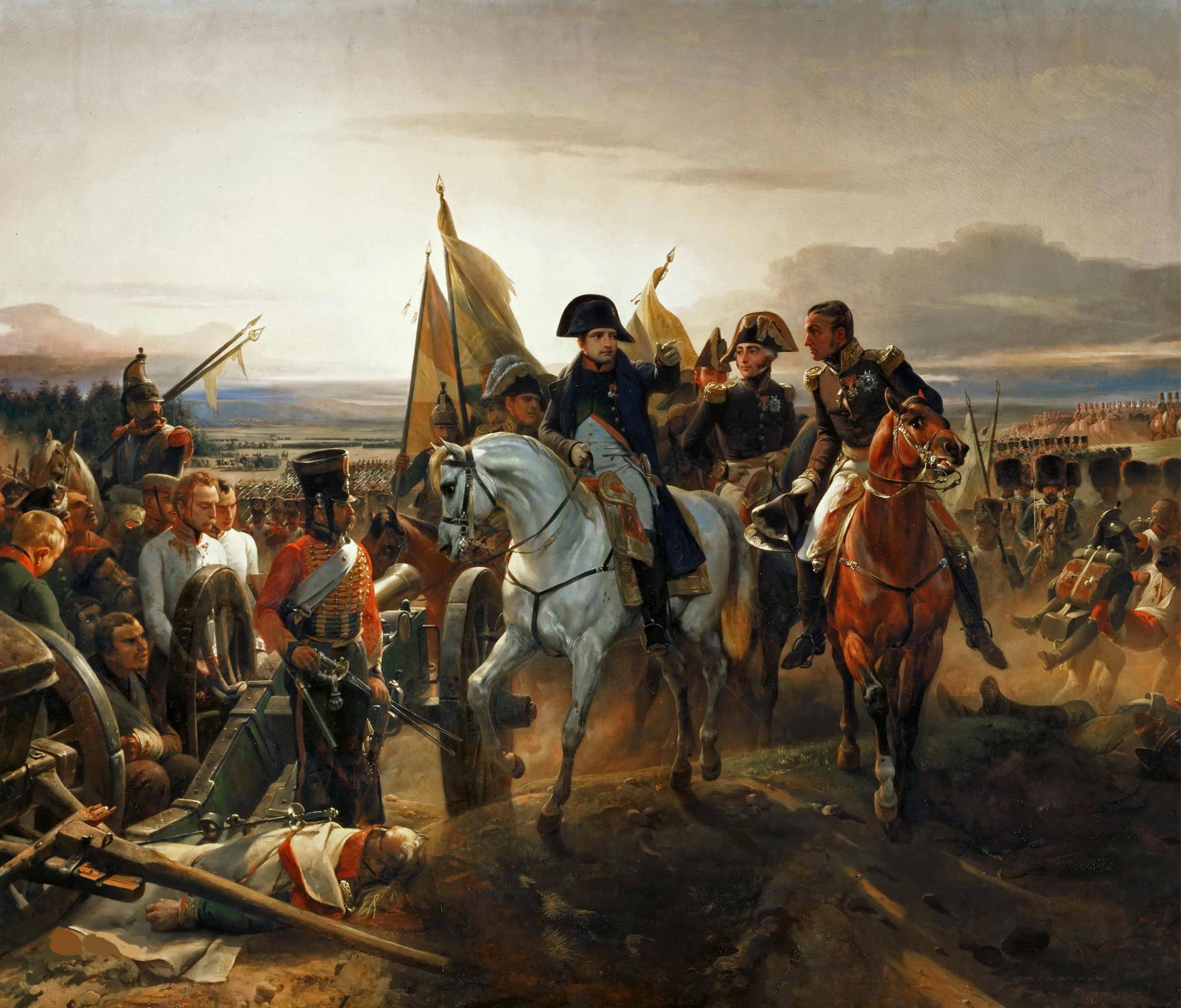
June 14: Napoleon triumphs over Russia's General Benningsen, at the Battle of Friedland.

1807 (MDCCCVII) was a common year starting on Thursday of the Gregorian calendar and a common year starting on Tuesday of the Julian calendar, the 1807th year of the Common Era (CE) and Anno Domini (AD) designations, the 807th year of the 2nd millennium, the 7th year of the 19th century, and the 8th year of the 1800s decade. As of the start of 1807, the Gregorian calendar was 12 days ahead of the Julian calendar, which remained in localized use until 1923.

== Events ==
=== January–March ===
- January 7 – The United Kingdom of Great Britain and Ireland issues an Order in Council prohibiting British ships from trading with France or its allies.
- January 20 – The Sierra Leone Company, faced with bankruptcy because of the imminent abolition of the slave trade in British colonies, petitions the British government for purchase and transfer of its property to the Crown; Parliament approves the transfer on July 29, and it takes effect on January 1, 1808.
- February 3 – Napoleonic Wars and Anglo-Spanish War: Battle of Montevideo – The British Army captures Montevideo from the Spanish Empire, as part of the British invasions of the Río de la Plata.
- February 7 – Napoleon leads the forces of the French Empire in an invasion of the Russian Empire, and begins fighting at the Battle of Eylau against Russian and Prussian forces.
- February 8 – Battle of Eylau: Napoleon fights a hard but inconclusive battle against the Russians under Bennigsen.
- February 10 – The Survey of the Coast (renamed the United States Coast Survey in 1836 and the United States Coast and Geodetic Survey in 1878) is established; work begins on August 3, 1816.
- February 17 – Henry Christopher is elected first President of the State of Haiti, ruling the northern part of the country.
- February 19 – Burr conspiracy: In Alabama, former Vice President of the United States Aaron Burr is tried for conspiracy, but acquitted.
- February 23 – The Slave Trade Act is passed in the House of Commons of the United Kingdom by an overwhelming majority.
- March 2 – The United States Congress passes the Act Prohibiting Importation of Slaves "into any port or place within the jurisdiction of the United States ... from any foreign kingdom, place, or country" (to take effect January 1, 1808).
- March 25
  - The United Kingdom Slave Trade Act becomes law abolishing the slave trade in most of the British Empire with effect from 1 May (slavery itself is abolished in British colonies in 1833).
  - The Swansea and Mumbles Railway in South Wales, at this time known as the Oystermouth Railway, becomes the first passenger-carrying railway in the world.
- March 29 – H. W. Olbers discovers the asteroid Vesta.

=== April–June ===
- April 4–12 – Froberg mutiny: The British suppress a mutiny at Fort Ricasoli, Malta, by men of the irregularly-recruited Froberg Regiment.
- April 14 – African Institution holds its first meeting in London; it is intended to improve social conditions in Sierra Leone.
- May 22 – A grand jury indicts former Vice President of the United States Aaron Burr for treason.
- May 24 – Siege of Danzig ends after 6 weeks with Prussian and Russian defenders capitulating to French forces.
- May 29 – Selim III, Ottoman Emperor since 1789, is deposed in favour of his nephew Mustafa IV.
- May 31 – Primitive Methodism originates in an All Day of Prayer at Mow Cop, in the north midlands of England.
- June 9 – The Duke of Portland is chosen as Prime Minister after the United Kingdom general election.
- June 10 – The Battle of Heilsberg ends in a draw.
- June 14 – Battle of Friedland: Napoleon decisively defeats Bennigsen's Russian army.
- June 22 – Chesapeake–Leopard affair: British Royal Navy fourth rate HMS Leopard attacks and boards United States Navy frigate USS Chesapeake off Norfolk, Virginia, seeking deserters. This act of British aggression plays a role in the run-up to the War of 1812.

=== July–September ===
- July 5 – A disastrous British attack is mounted against Buenos Aires, during the second failed invasion of the Río de la Plata.
- July 7–9 – The Treaties of Tilsit are signed between France, Prussia and Russia. Napoleon and Russian Emperor Alexander I ally together against the British. The Prussians are forced to cede more than half their territory, which is formed into the Duchy of Warsaw in their former Polish lands, and the Kingdom of Westphalia in western Germany. The Free City of Danzig is also formed (established July 21 by Napoleon).
- July 13 – With the death of Henry Benedict Stuart, the last Stuart claimant to the throne of the United Kingdom, Jacobitism comes to an effective end.
- July 20 – Nicéphore Niépce is awarded a patent by Emperor Napoleon for the Pyréolophore, the world's first internal combustion engine, after it successfully powers a boat upstream on the river Saône in France.
- August 17 – The North River Steamboat, Robert Fulton's first American steamboat, leaves New York City for Albany on the Hudson River, inaugurating the first commercial steamboat service in the world.
- September 1 – Former U.S. Vice President Aaron Burr is acquitted of treason. He had been accused of plotting to annex parts of Louisiana and Mexico, to become part of an independent republic.
- September 2–7 – Battle of Copenhagen: The British Royal Navy bombards Copenhagen with fire bombs and phosphorus rockets, to prevent the Dano-Norwegian navy from surrendering to Napoleon; 30% of the city is destroyed, and 2,000 citizens are killed.
- September 7 – Robert Morrison, the first Protestant missionary to China, arrives in Guangzhou (Canton).
- September 13 – Beethoven's Mass in C major, Op. 86, is premiered, commissioned by Nikolaus I, Prince Esterházy, and displeasing him.
- September 27 – Napoleon purchases the Borghese art collection, including the Antinous Mondragone, and brings it to Paris.

=== October–December ===
- October 6 – English chemist Humphry Davy electrochemically isolates potassium from potash.
- October 9 – Prussian Reform Movement: Serfdom is abolished by the October edict.
- October 30 – El Escorial Conspiracy: Ferdinand, Prince of Asturias is arrested for conspiring against his father Charles IV of Spain.
- November 13 – The Geological Society of London is founded.
- November 24 – Battle of Abrantes, Portugal: The French under Jean-Andoche Junot take the town.
- November 29 – Portuguese Queen Maria I and the Court embark at Lisbon, bound for Brazil. Rio de Janeiro becomes the Portuguese capital.
- December 5–11 – Napoleonic Wars: Raid on Griessie – A British Royal Navy squadron attacks the Dutch port of Griessie on Java in the Dutch East Indies, eliminating the last Dutch naval force in the Pacific and concluding the Java campaign of 1806–1807.
- December 17 – Napoleonic Wars: France issues the Milan Decree which confirms the Continental System (i.e. no European country is to trade with the United Kingdom).
- December 22 – The United States Congress passes the Embargo Act, a trade embargo on all foreign nations.

=== Approximate date ===
- Coup d'état of Pengiran Muda Omar Ali Saifuddien by Pengiran Digadong Ayah.
- Battle of Hingakaka between two factions of Māori people, the largest battle ever fought in New Zealand, and the last fought there without firearms. In 1807 or 1808 is fought the Battle of Moremonui, first of the Musket Wars.
- Le Petit Oracle des Dames 42 card deck and booklet are published in Paris by the widow of Gueffier.

== Births ==
=== January–June ===
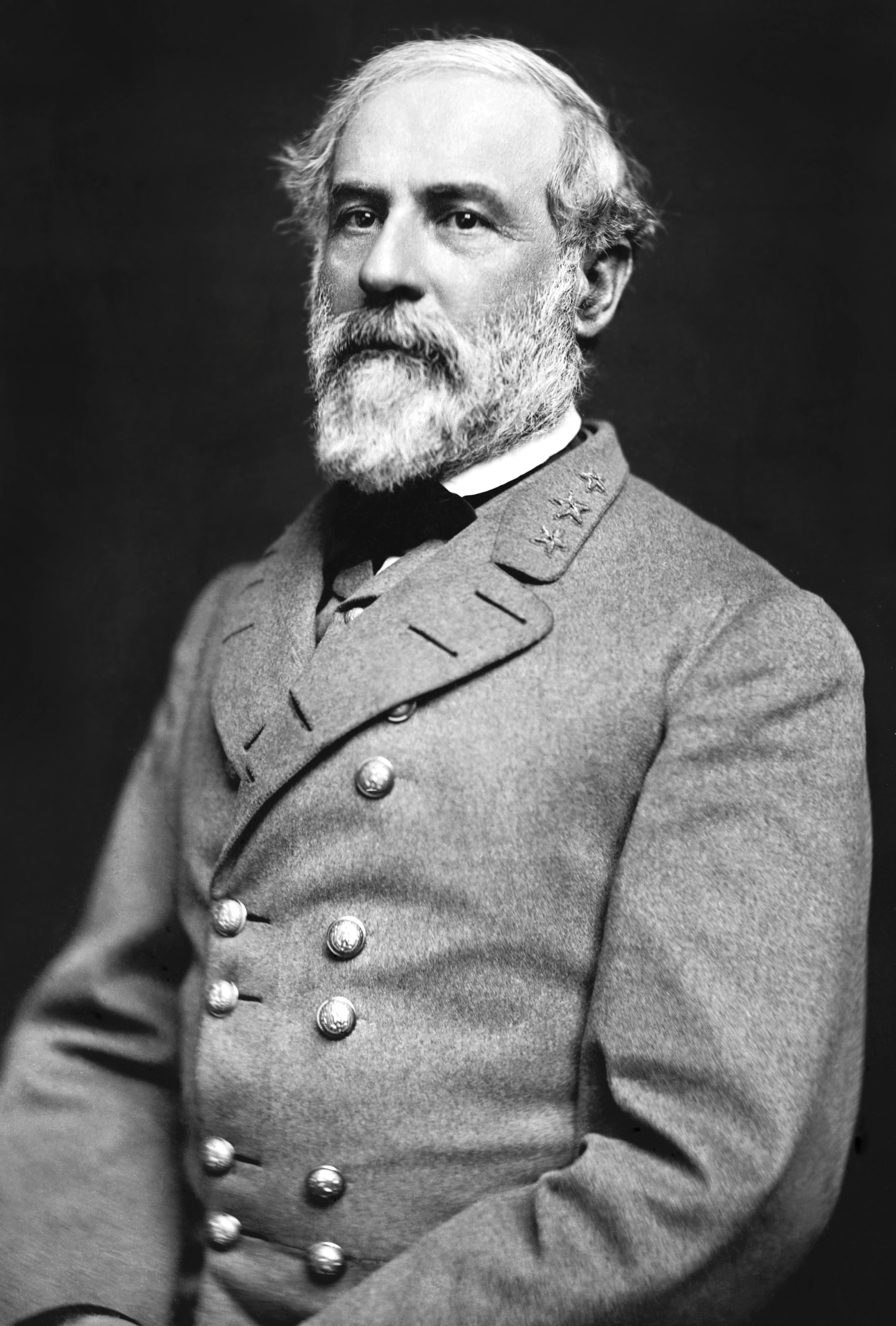
Robert E. Lee

- January 13 – Napoleon Bonaparte Buford, American general, railroad executive (d. 1883)
- January 19 – Robert E. Lee, American Confederate general (d. 1870)
- January 28 – Robert McClure, Irish-born Arctic explorer (d. 1873)
- February 10 – Lajos Batthyány, 1st Prime Minister of Hungary (d. 1849)
- February 27 – Henry Wadsworth Longfellow, American poet (d. 1882)
- March 1 – Wilford Woodruff, American religious leader (d. 1898)
- March 14 – Josephine of Leuchtenberg, Queen of Sweden and Norway (d. 1876)
- April 2 – William F. Packer, American politician (d. 1870)
- April 3 – Jane Digby, English adventurer (d. 1881)
- April 20 – John Milton, Governor of Florida (d. 1865)
- April 26 – Charles Auguste Frossard, French general (d. 1875)
- May 28 – Louis Agassiz, Swiss-born zoologist and geologist (d. 1873)
- June 6 – Adrien-François Servais, Belgian musician (d. 1866)
- June 16 – John Westcott, American surveyor and politician (d. 1888)

=== July–December ===
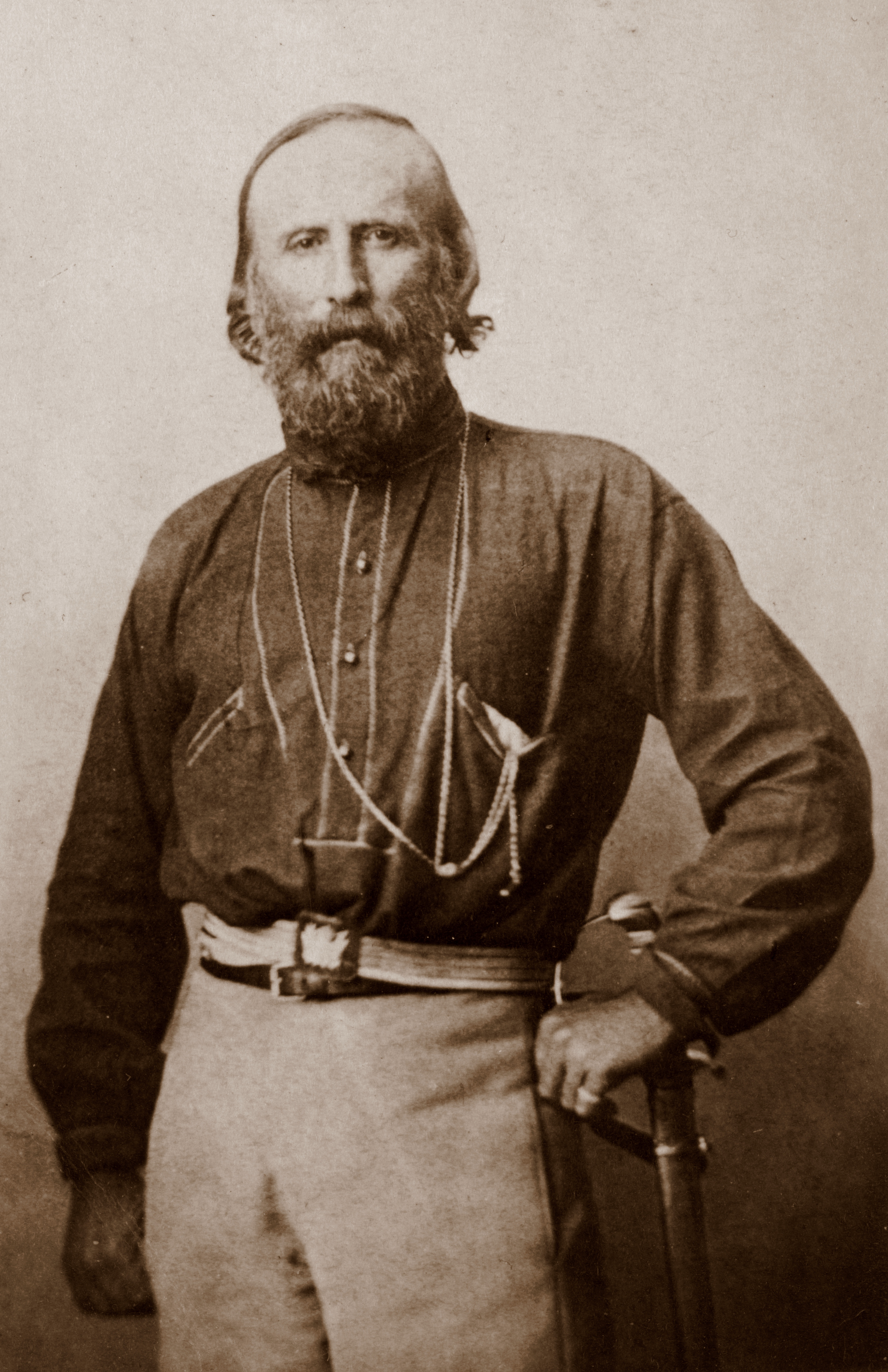
Giuseppe Garibaldi

- July 4 – Giuseppe Garibaldi, Italian patriot (d. 1882)
- August 11 – David Rice Atchison, American politician (d. 1886)
- August 15 – Jules Grévy, 4th President of France (d. 1891)
- August 18 – Charles Francis Adams Sr., American historical editor, politician and diplomat (d. 1886)
- September 2 – Fredrika Runeberg, Finnish writer (d. 1879)
- September 7 – Henry Sewell, 1st Premier of New Zealand (d. 1879)
- September 16 – John Lenthall, American naval architect and shipbuilder (d. 1882)
- October 8 – Harriet Taylor, English philosophical writer (d. 1858)
- October 26 – Barbu Catargiu, 1st Prime Minister of Romania (d. 1862)
- October 29 – Anđeo Kraljević, Herzegovinian Catholic bishop (d. 1879)
- October 30 – Christopher Wordsworth, Bishop of Lincoln (d. 1885)
- November 16 – Eduard von Fransecky, Prussian general (d. 1890)
- December 8 – Friedrich Traugott Kützing, German pharmacist, botanist and phycologist (d. 1893)
- December 17 – John Greenleaf Whittier, American Quaker poet and abolitionist (d. 1892)

== Deaths ==
=== January–June ===
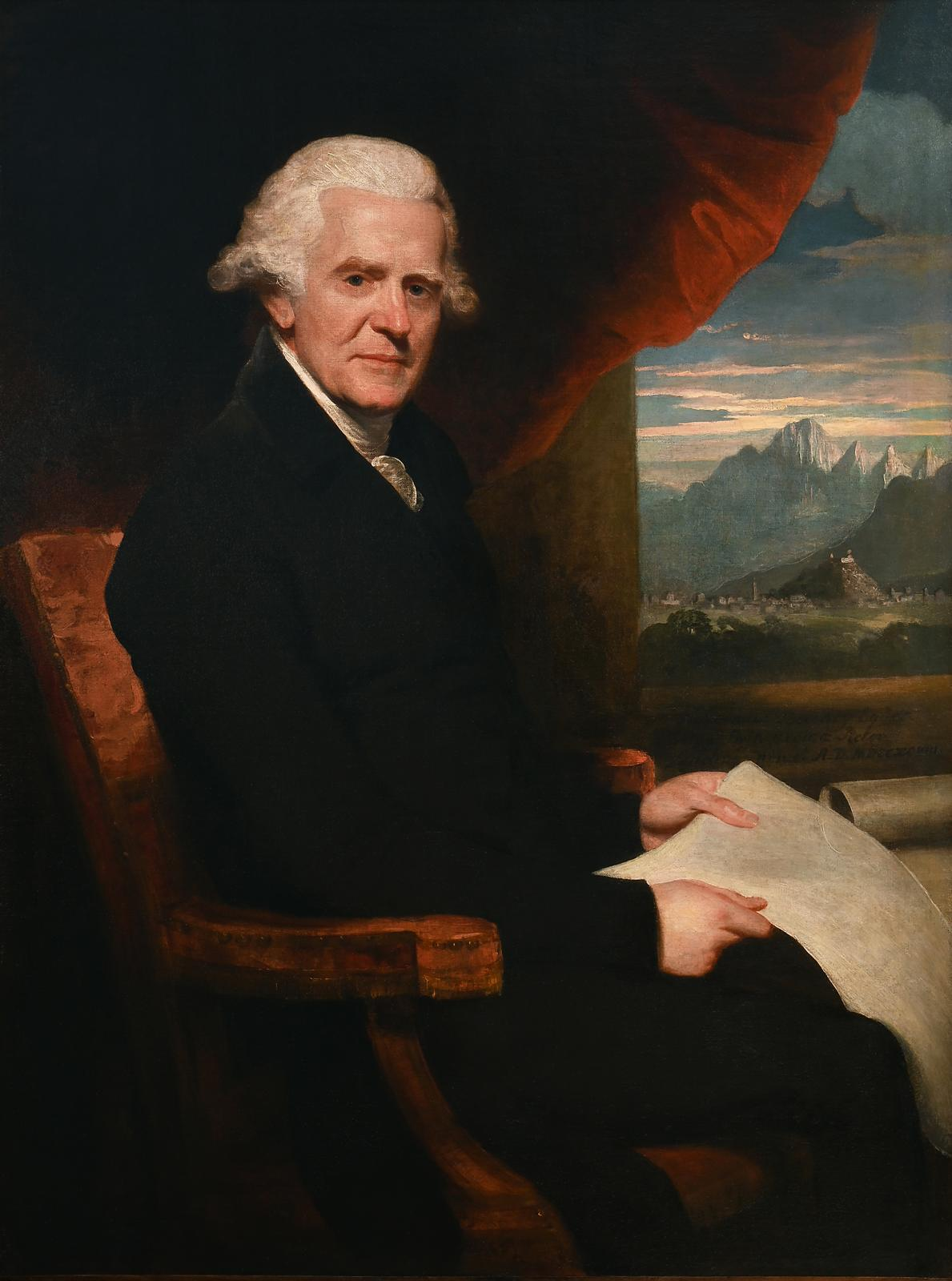
Pasquale Paoli

- February 1 – Sir Thomas Troubridge, 1st Baronet, British admiral (b. c. 1758)
- February 5 – Pasquale Paoli, Corsican patriot, military leader (b. 1725)
- February 27 – Louise du Pierry, French astronomer (b. 1746)
- March 10 – Jean Thurel, French soldier (b. 1698)
- April 4 – Jérôme Lalande, French astronomer (b. 1732)
- April 10 – Duchess Anna Amalia of Brunswick-Wolfenbüttel, regent of Weimar and Eisenach (b. 1739)
- May 10 – Jean-Baptiste Donatien de Vimeur, comte de Rochambeau, French soldier (b. 1725)
- May 13 – Eliphalet Dyer, American statesman, judge (b. 1721)
- May 17 – John Gunby, Maryland soldier in the American Revolutionary War (b. 1745)
- May 18 – John Douglas, Scottish Anglican bishop, man of letters (b. 1721)
- June 9 – Andrew Sterett, American naval officer (b. 1778)

=== July–December ===
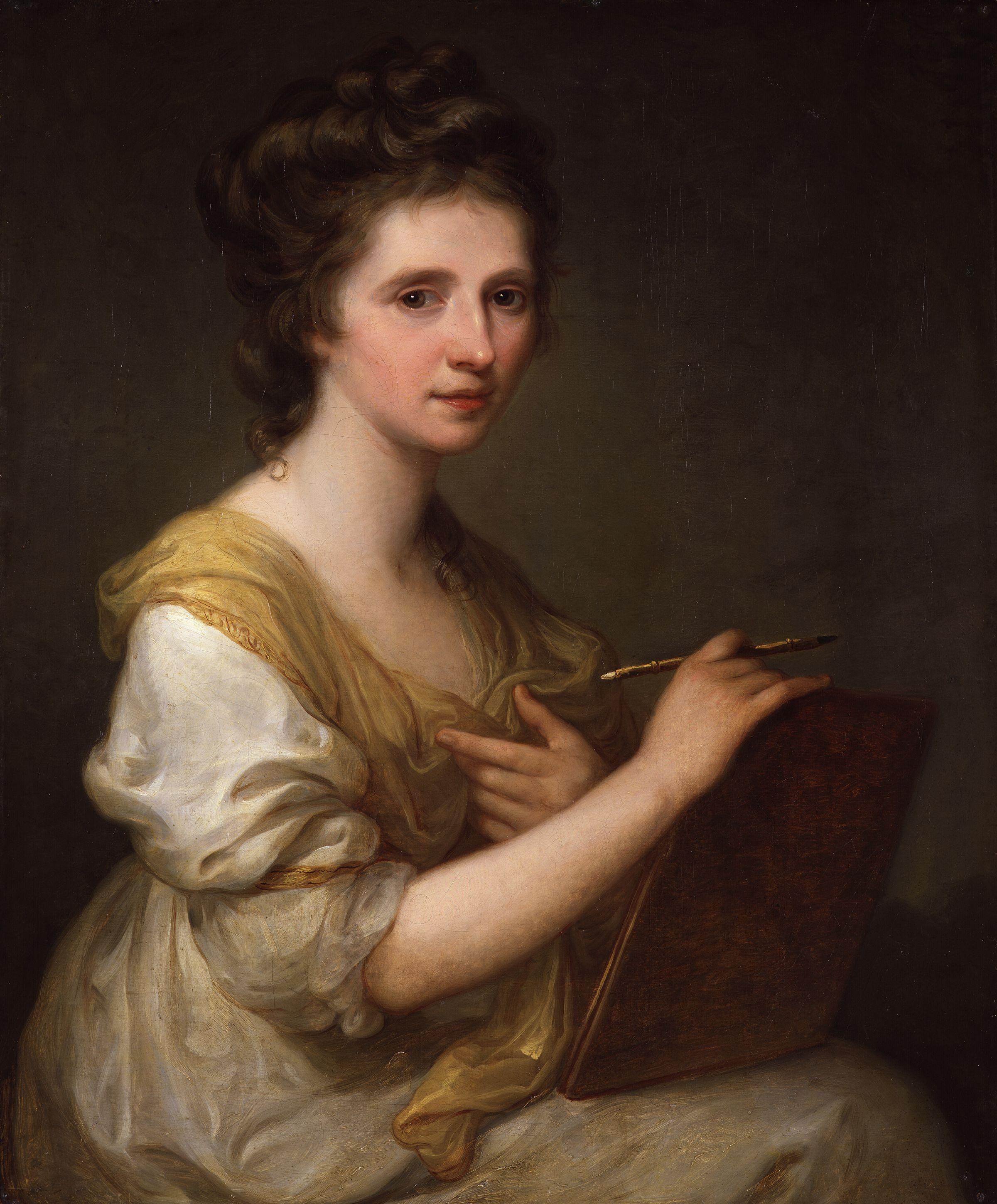
Angelica Kauffman

- July 13 – Henry Benedict Stuart, Italian-born cardinal, Jacobite claimant to the British throne (b. 1725)
- July 19 – Uriah Tracy, American politician and congressman from Connecticut, 1793 until 1807 (b. 1755)
- 5 August – Jeanne Baret French explorer, naturalist, botanist (b. 1740)
- September 14 – George Townshend, 1st Marquess Townshend, British field marshal (b. 1724)
- October 22 – Jean-François Houbigant, French perfumer (b. 1752)
- November 2 – Louis Auguste Le Tonnelier de Breteuil, Prime Minister of King Louis XVI of France (b. 1730)
- November 5 – Angelica Kauffman, Swiss painter (b. 1741)
- November 8
  - Darejan Dadiani, Georgian queen consort (b. 1738)
  - Pierre-Alexandre-Laurent Forfait, French engineer, hydrographer, politician, and Minister of the Navy (1799–1801) (b. 1752)
- November 23 – Jean-François Rewbell, French politician (b. 1747)
- November 26 – Oliver Ellsworth, American founding father and 3rd Chief Justice of the United States (b. 1745)
- December 19 – Friedrich Melchior, Baron von Grimm, German writer (b. 1723)
- December 21 – John Newton, English cleric, hymnist (b. 1725)
- December 29 – Diogo de Carvalho e Sampayo, Portuguese diplomat, scientist (b. 1750)
