= Jorge Silva (footballer, born 1972) =

Portuguese footballer

Personal information
- Full name: Jorge Soares da Silva
- Date of birth: 13 January 1972 (age 54)
- Place of birth: Lamego, Portugal
- Height: 1.83 m (6 ft 0 in)
- Position: Goalkeeper

Youth career
- 1985–1988: Lamego
- 1988–1991: Porto

Senior career*
Years	Team	Apps	(Gls)
1991–1992	Rio Ave	5	(0)
1992–1993	Porto	0	(0)
1993–1995	Rio Ave	63	(0)
1995–2001	Salgueiros	121	(0)
1996	→ Porto (loan)	1	(0)
2001–2004	Santa Clara	79	(0)
2004–2005	Dragões Sandinenses	36	(0)
2005–2007	Paredes	35	(0)
2006	→ Trofense (loan)	0	(0)
2007–2008	Vila Meã	21	(0)
2008–2010	Oliveirense	21	(0)
Total		382	(0)

International career
2000	Portugal	1	(0)
- * Club domestic league appearances and goals

Jorge Soares da Silva (born 13 January 1972) is a Portuguese former professional footballer who played as a goalkeeper.

== Playing career ==
Born in Lamego, Viseu District, Silva emerged through FC Porto's youth system, but could never be more than third choice with its first team. In the 1995–96 season he was part of the Primeira Liga-winning squad by playing four minutes in one game against C.F. Estrela da Amadora, and previously made his professional debut at Rio Ave FC.

Silva spent the better part of his career with two modest clubs in the top flight, S.C. Salgueiros – who had previously loaned him to Porto– and C.D. Santa Clara, reaching the Portugal national team for his only cap on 15 November 2000, where he featured one minute in a friendly with Israel after coming on as a substitute for Quim. In the 2003–04 campaign he played with the Azores side in the second tier and, from there onwards, competed mainly in the third.

In summer 2008, the 36-year-old Silva signed with U.D. Oliveirense, recently promoted to division two. After one season he called it quits, joining the club's coaching staff as goalkeeper coach; however, a string of injuries propelled him back to action, and he eventually appeared in five matches during 2009–10 (three wins, one loss, one draw, seven goals conceded), with his team narrowly missing out on another promotion.

== Coaching career ==
After retiring for good, Silva worked as goalkeeping coach for several teams.

== Personal life ==
Silva's younger brother, Francisco, was also a footballer. A defender, they shared teams at C.D. Trofense and Oliveirense.
