= Chico Silva (footballer, born 1978) =

Portuguese footballer

Personal information
- Full name: Francisco Miguel Soares Silva
- Date of birth: 9 May 1978 (age 48)
- Place of birth: Lamego, Portugal
- Height: 1.74 m (5 ft 9 in)
- Position: Left-back

Youth career
- 1991–1994: Cracks Lamego
- 1994–1996: Lamego

Senior career*
| Years | Team | Apps | (Gls) |
| 1996–1999 | Lamego | | |
| 1999–2001 | Vilanovense | 59 | (5) |
| 2002–2003 | Belenenses | 8 | (1) |
| 2003–2005 | Dragões Sandinenses | 65 | (6) |
| 2005–2006 | União Madeira | 20 | (0) |
| 2006–2007 | Trofense | 26 | (0) |
| 2007–2009 | Paços Ferreira | 41 | (2) |
| 2009–2013 | Oliveirense | 91 | (5) |
| Total | | 310+ | (19+) |
- * Club domestic league appearances and goals

Francisco Miguel Soares Silva (born 9 May 1978 in Lamego, Viseu District), known as Chico Silva, is a Portuguese former professional footballer who played as a left-back.

His older brother, Jorge, was also a footballer.
