= Castle of Lamego =

Medieval castle in Portugal

- Castelo de Lamego
- Viseu, Douro, Norte Region, Portugal in Portugal
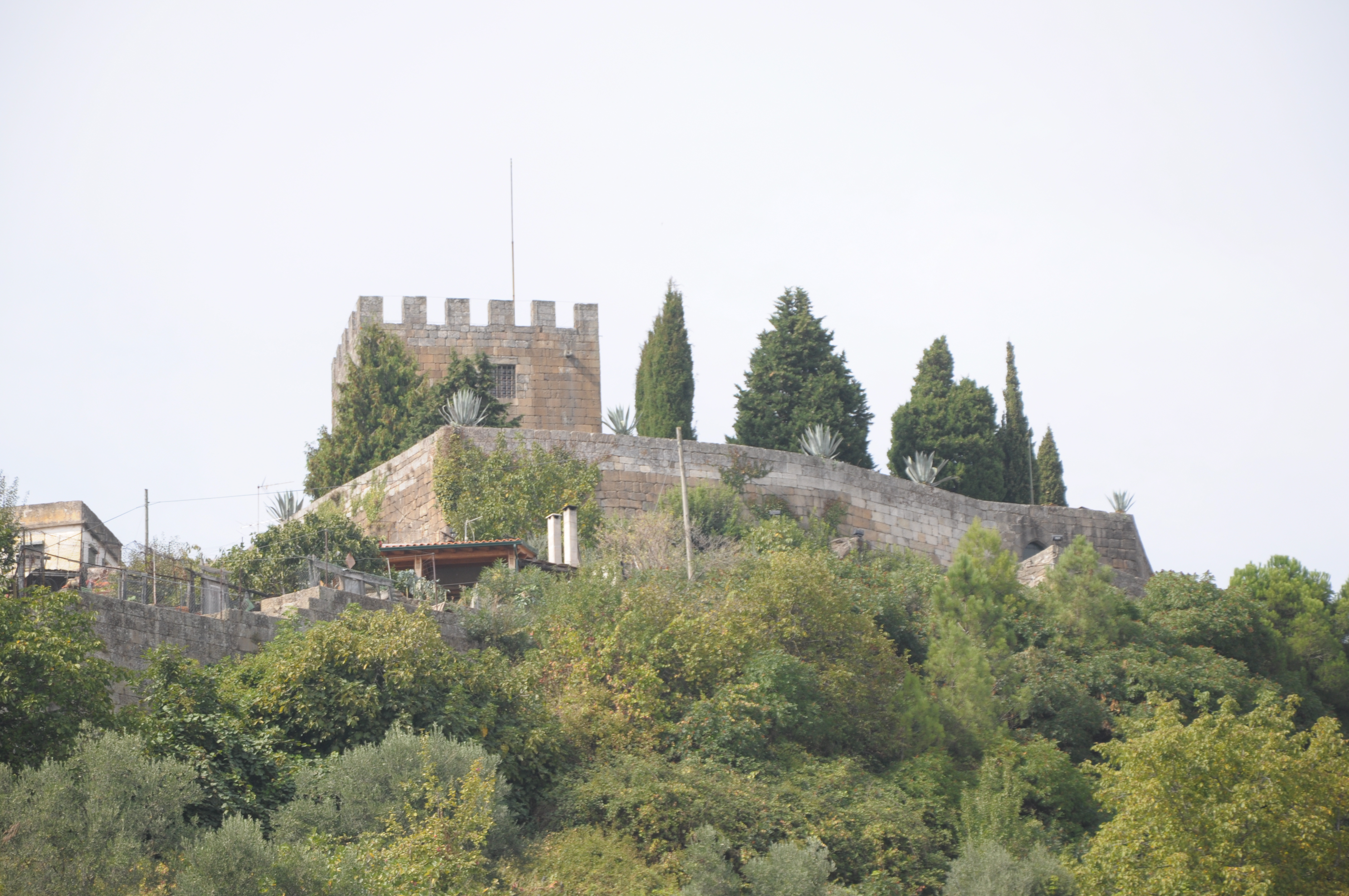
- A view of the castle on the hilltop of Lamego

Site information
- Type: Castle
- Owner: Portuguese Republic
- Operator: Câmara Municipal de Lamego, ceded 21 October 1950
- Open to the public: Public

Location
- Coordinates: 41°5′57.0″N 7°48′31.5″W

Site history
- Materials: Granite

The Castle of Lamego (Portuguese: Castelo de Lamego) is a medieval castle located in the civil parish of Lamego (Almacave e Sé), in the municipality of Lamego, Portuguese district of Viseu.

== History ==
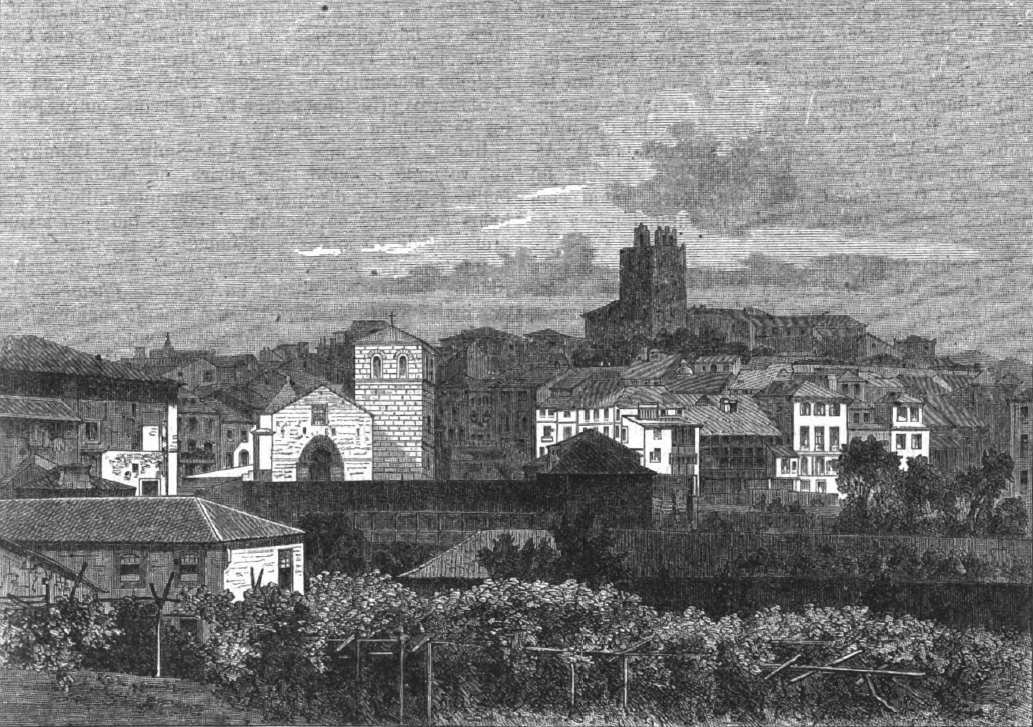
A drawing of the Lamego skyline with the castle in the distance

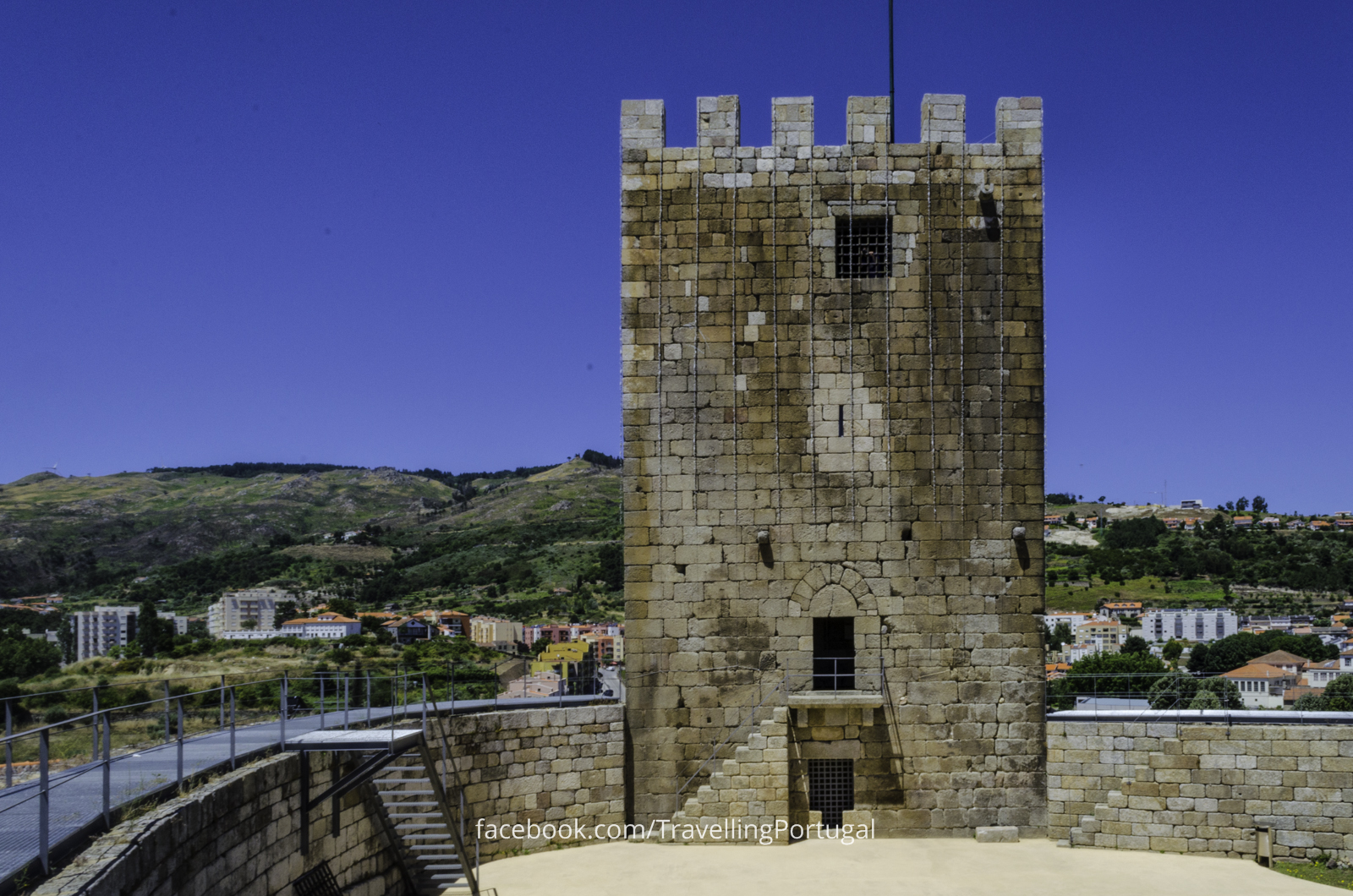
The keep tower and part of the walls

Early human settlement in the territory dates to the Bronze Age, although it may have been inhabited by the Lacão peoples beginning in the 5th century B.C. With the Roman occupation of the Iberian Peninsula, the Emperor Trajan ordered the reconstruction of the village, then called Lameca, from simple villa to civitas. Between the 5th and 8th century, it was settled by the Visigoths, and became the seat of a bishopric (marked by the Basilica of São Pedro de Balsemão). In the 8th century, Moors occupied the territory.

Following the Christian Reconquista of the peninsula, the village was conquered by Ordoño II of Galicia in 910. It was then reconquered in 997, by the forces of Almansor and caliphate of Cordoba, and would remain their possession until the 11th century. On 29 November 1057, the city was conquered from the Moors by Ferdinand I of León. Sometime in the 12 century, the tower keep and dungeons were constructed, followed in the 13th century by the fortification walls. The territory and its castle were given away in the dowry during the marriage of Henry of Burgundy and Teresa of Leon, and integrated into the lands of Portucalense (the County of Portugal). With its independence, they were donated to the Mendes (the Masters of Bragança) who initiated a series of construction projects in the 12th century, such as the keep tower, dungeons, the walls and cistern erected by Moors in the 11th century.

During the reign of King D. Sancho II (1223–1248), Abril Peres de Lumiares was alcalde was until 1245. It is believed that after the 1258 Inquirições (Inquiries), during the reign of King D. Afonso III (1248–1279), that the elaborate walls were erected.

Between the 14th and 15th centuries the town expanded, owing to manufacture of textiles and a regally-mandated annual regional fair. During this period the alcaldes of the castle were the Coutinhos, that included Gonçalo Vasques Coutinho, then also alcalde of the Castle of Trancoso, who during the 1383-1385 crisis, supported the Portuguese pretender, the Master of Aviz. At the end of this period, D. Francisco Coutinho, 4th Count of Marialva ordered the construction a window in the middle of the keep tower.

Following a brief economic recession in the 16th century, the wine industry brought a new prosperity to the region, resulting in the expansion of estates in Lamego. The niche, dedicated to Nossa Senhora da Graça, was likely constructed in 1642, by order of António de Castro. A contract to execute the grates of the prison, annexed to the tower, was executed by the locksmith António Luís for 250$000 Portuguese reis on 25 August 1696.

In 1730, from descriptions, the Porta da Vila (Villa Gate) included an arch and two towers, where a bell served as clock. At that time, the former-Casa da Câmara (municipal residence) was located onsite within an old bastion and awning with stone, sculpted columns and tower, as well as a second bastion, designated Castelinho. A similar reference appeared in 1758 to the oratory of Nossa Senhora da Graça, within the internal section of the arch of the Porta do Sol (Sun Gate).

A bell was executed for the belfry in 1789, by Mateus Gomes for the municipal council. A new bell was later executed in 1875 with Naciso António from Braga.

On 6 March 1789, the plasterers Bernardo Cardoso and Francisco de Moura was contracted to work on the castle tower.

In 1824, there was an authorization to build houses on the fortifications, but, ten years later, a businessman requested permission to demolish one of the towers, that was located in his residence.

A new bell was executed in 1914, by Adriano Loureiro, by order of the municipality.

In 1920, the clock located in the Villa Gate was auctioned in the keep tower, and substituted.

Between 1940 and 1941 the remaining bells were removed from the castle and installed in the Church of Santa Maria de Almacave.

A risk assessment for the property was elaborated in October 2005 by the DGEMN.

== Architecture ==
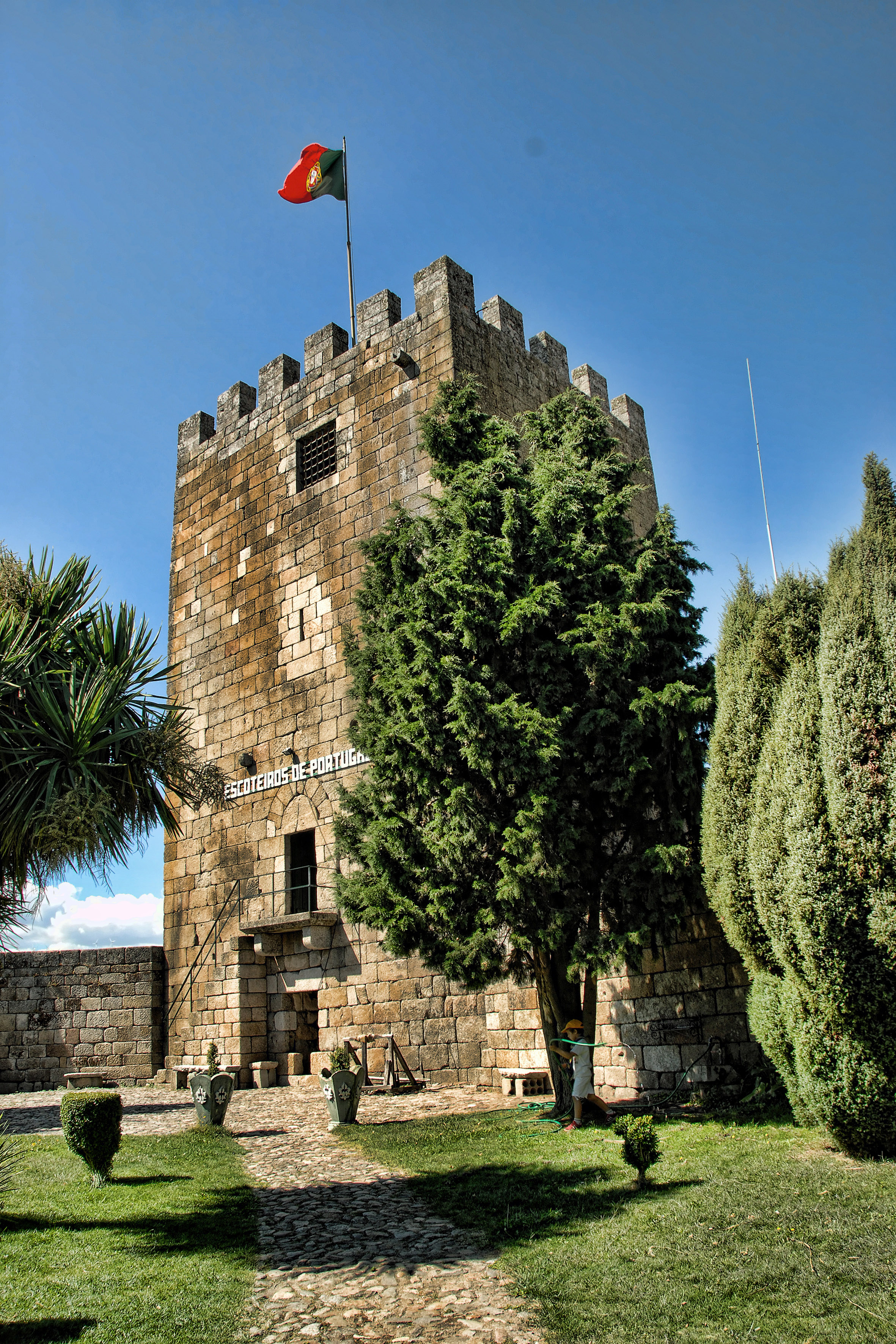
An oblique view of the keep tower

The castle was installed on a hilltop 543 metres (1,781 ft) above sea level, on rocky, granite and schist outcroppings. It includes two lines of walls (interior or exterior) that fall within the urban context of the castle, with views of the Coura, Balsemão and Varosa Rivers.

An irregular plan, the castle includes a rectangular keep tower oriented to the west, with doorway access to the upper floors 3 metres (9.8 ft) above ground. The structure is marked by various small crevices on various elevations, along with a door at the ground floor. Crenellated, the three floors are constructed of wood, and interconnected by wood staircases. Compounding the citadel, is an inner face that follows the walled perimeter, hexagonal and irregular, with battlement and broken arch gateway, substantially oriented to the east.

The second line of walls, are longer and encompasses the citadel, extending to the south to the lower elevations. To the east, between many segments of the walls of the Porta da Vila or Porta dos Figos are other lateral towers, named the Porta de Aguião, Porta do Norte and Porta dos Fogos. There is also a recessed arched doorway, over which was constructed a wood oratory. To the left, is a staircase that access the balcony where the bell was situated and, at the top, the tower of the old municipal hall. To the extreme south, is the Porta do Sol, along a wall of heft proportions, composed of broken arch with epigraphic niche, and with access to two important accesses in the wall portion of the urban area.

Along the Rua da Cisterna is a cistern of sculpted stone with inscription and a vaulted ceiling with four arches supporting lateral pillars. There is a small opening for illumination and an access door with interior staircase.

Nearby is the Praça de Armas (Place-of-arms), an area of 90 metres (300 ft), forming an irregular, hexagonal polygon.
