= Britiande =

- Civil parish
- Location in Portugal
- Coordinates: 41.063°N 7.793°W
- Country: Portugal
- Region: Norte
- Intermunic. comm.: Douro
- District: Viseu
- Municipality: Lamego

Area
  - Total: 4.80 km^{2} (1.85 sq mi)

Population (2011)
  - Total: 934
  - Density: 190/km^{2} (500/sq mi)
- Time zone: UTC+00:00 (WET)
  - Summer (DST): UTC+01:00 (WEST)

Britiande is a town in Portugal. It is a commune (freguesia) of Lamego Municipality. The population in 2011 was 934, in an area of 4.80 km^{2}.
