= Lamego =

- Municipality
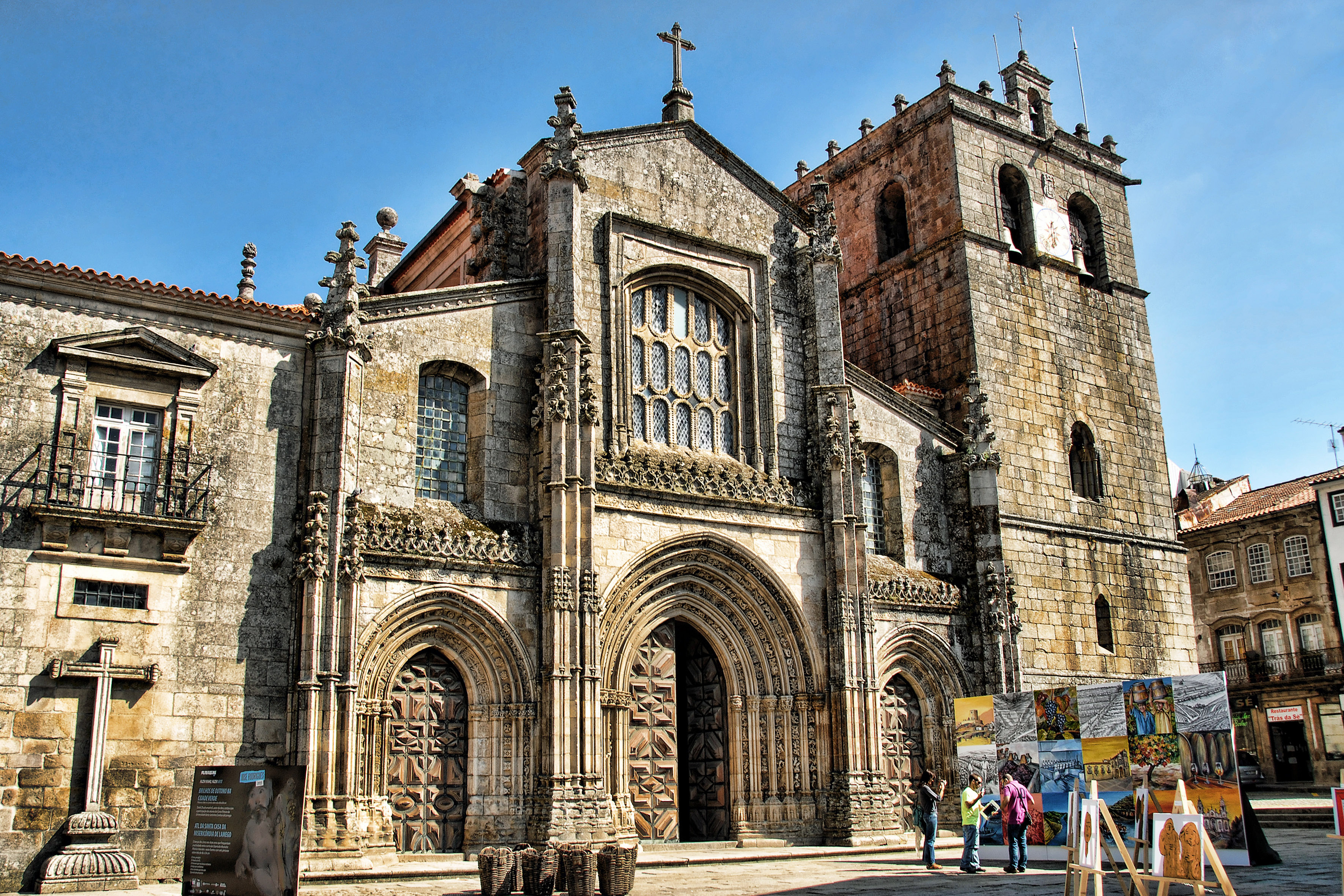
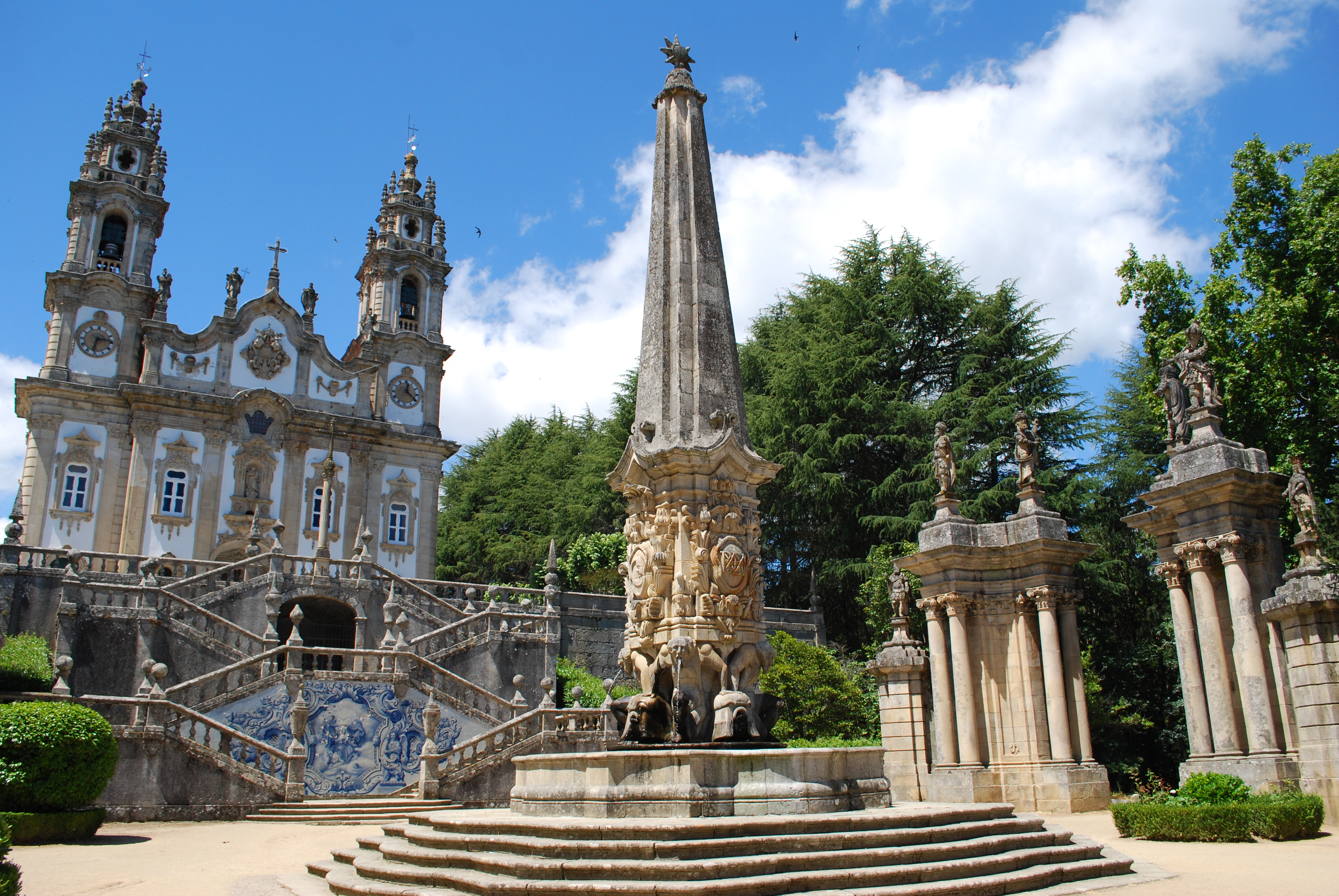
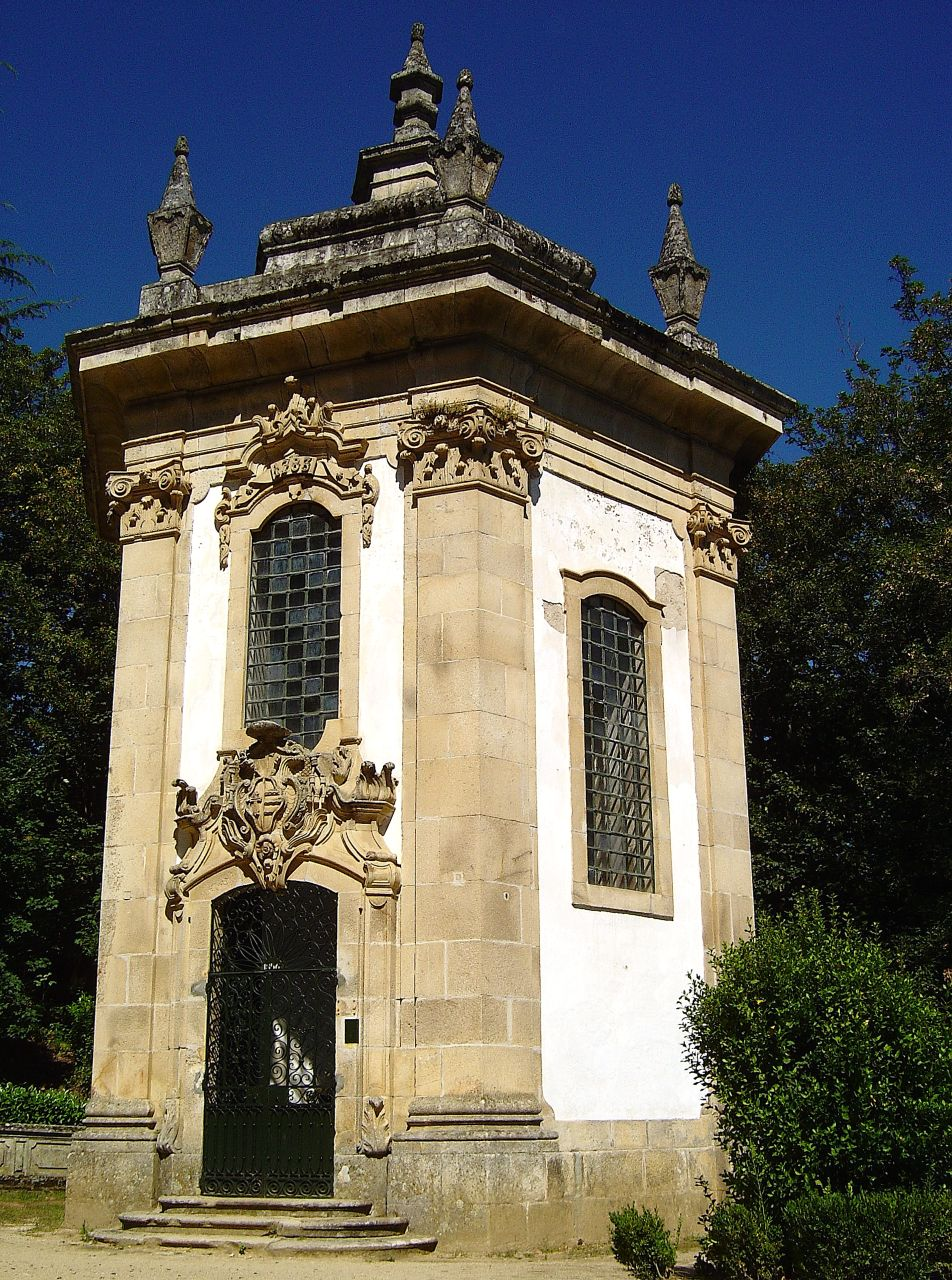
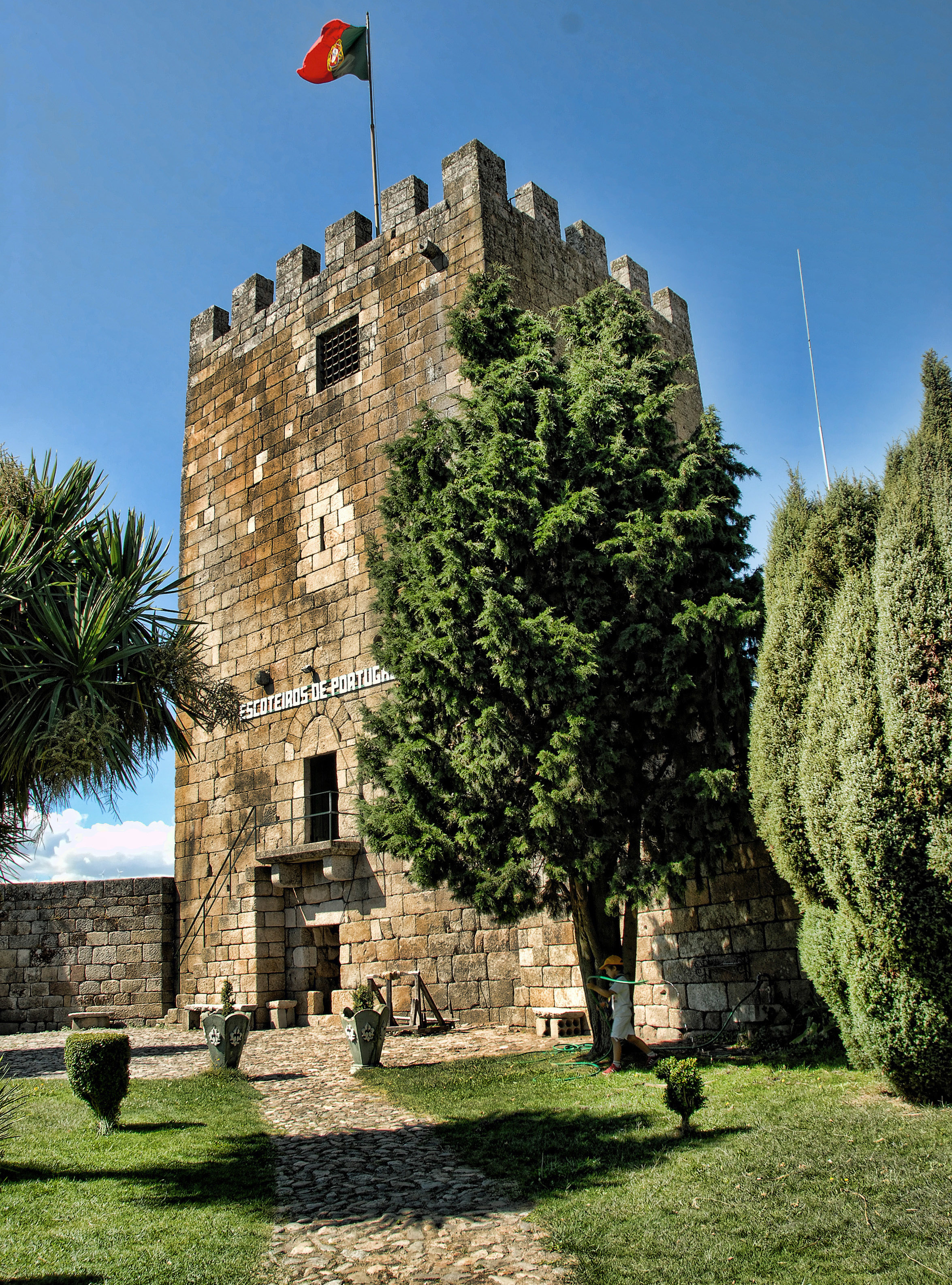
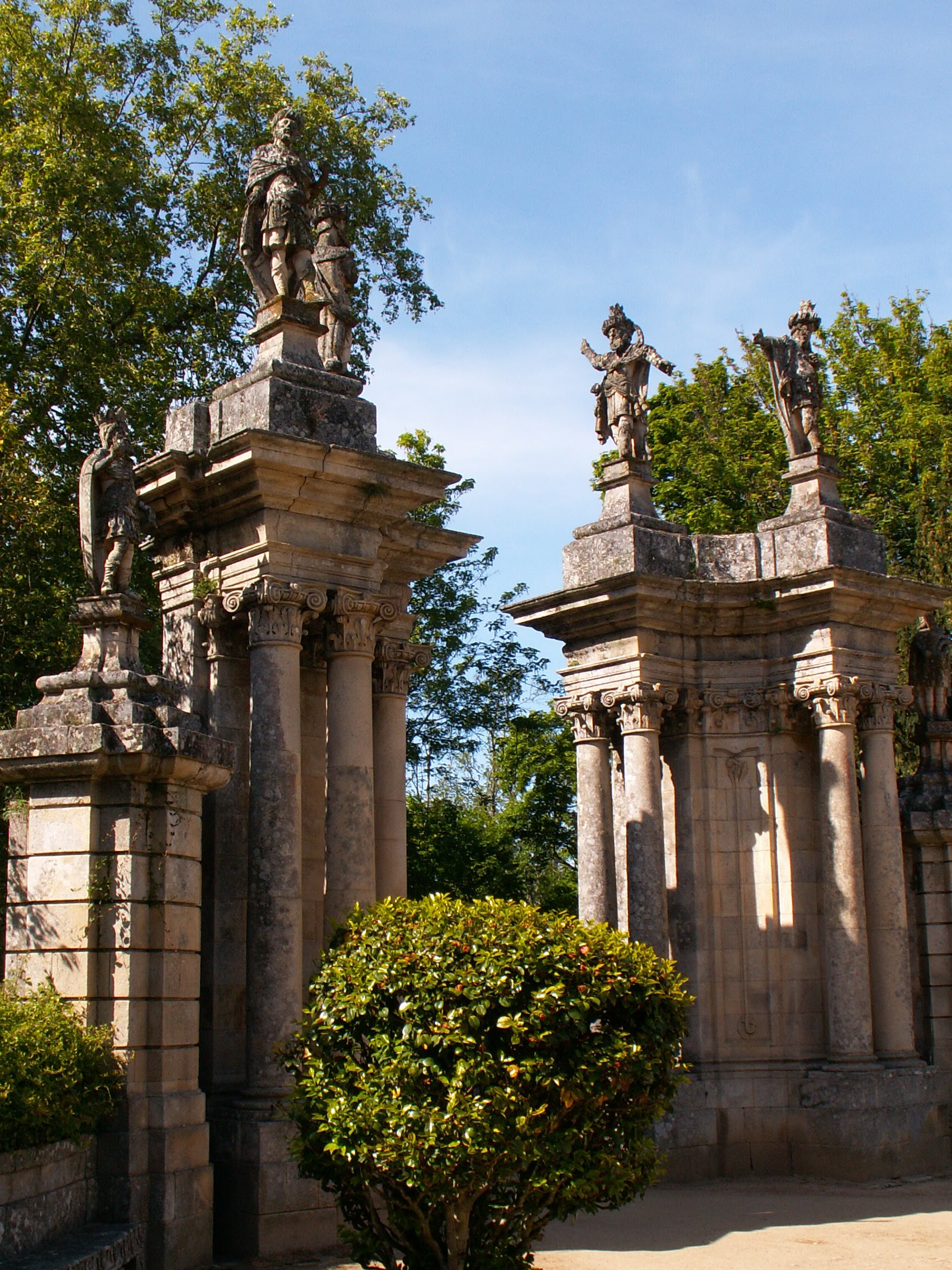
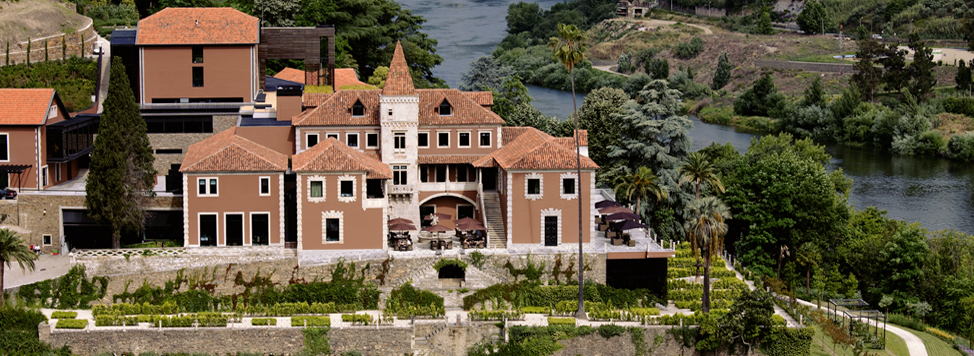

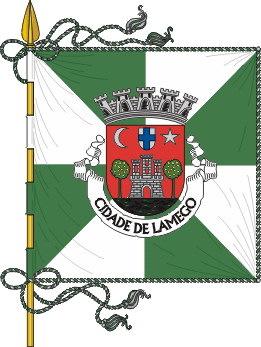
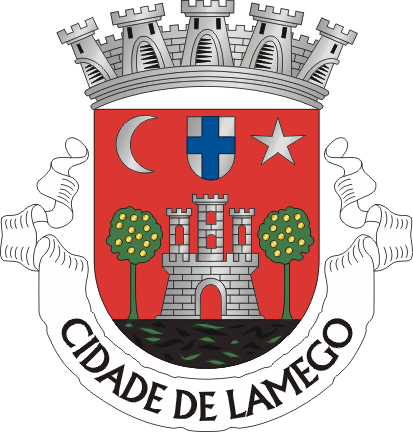
- Flag Coat of arms
- Interactive map of Lamego
- Location in Portugal
- Coordinates: 41°6′3″N 7°48′36″W
- Country: Portugal
- Region: Norte
- Intermunic. comm.: Douro
- District: Viseu
- Parishes: 18

Government
  - President: Francisco Lopes (PSD-CDS)

Area
  - Total: 165.42 km^{2} (63.87 sq mi)
- Elevation: 644 m (2,113 ft)

Population (2011)
  - Total: 26,691
  - Density: 161.35/km^{2} (417.90/sq mi)
- Time zone: UTC+00:00 (WET)
  - Summer (DST): UTC+01:00 (WEST)
- Postal code: 5100
- Patron: Santa Maria Maior
- Website: www.cm-lamego.pt

Lamego (European Portuguese: [lɐˈmeɣu]; Proto-Celtic: *Lamecum) is a city and municipality in the Viseu District, in the Norte Region of the Douro in northern Portugal. Located on the shores of the Balsemão River, the municipality has a population of 26,691, in an area of 165.42 km^{2}.

With origins before the Roman occupation of the Iberian Peninsula, Lamego is known for its historic city center, having a long history as a principal city of the former Trás-os-Montes e Alto Douro Province. Legend holds that the first Portuguese Cortes were held in Lamego, in 1143. The Roman Catholic Diocese of Lamego is based in the city center.

== Etymology ==
The toponymic name Lamego was derived from Lamaecus, a Hispano-Celtic and Roman derivative referring to owners of agrarian titles in the 3rd century around the local castle.

== History ==
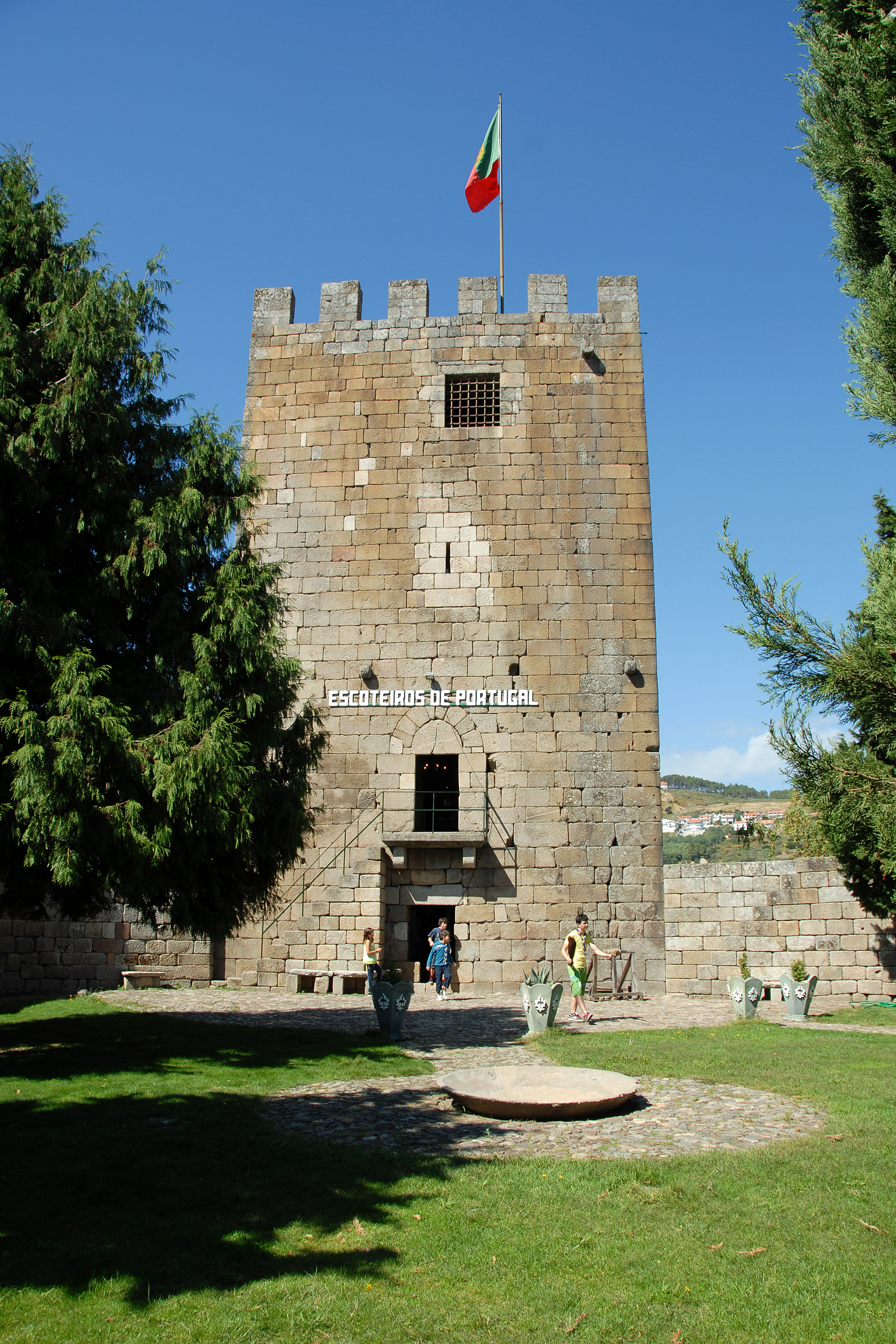
Lamego Castle, with origins in the 5th century.

The area around Lamego was inhabited by Ligures and Turduli, and during the Roman presence it was occupied by Coelerni, which left behind several monuments. Due to the placement of the castle, it is likely that a castro originally existed on the site. During the Inquirições (Inventory/Enquiries) of King Afonso (during the 13th century) there was reference to the Castro de Lameco, referred to as a medieval fortification. Destroyed by the Romans, the inhabitants were forced to descend into the valley and cultivate the land, as part of the Roman reorganization of the land.

=== Middle Ages ===
Lamego became Catholic when the Visigothic king Rekared I converted to Catholicism. In 569, during the Council of Lugo, there appeared references to Sardinário the Bishop of Lamego. During the reign of Sisebuto (612-621), the Visigothic monarch coined currency from Lamego, indicating the importance of the region to commerce and culture.

Just outside the city center is the tiny 7th century São Pedro de Balsemão Chapel, a Visigothic chapel believed to be the oldest in Portugal (and second oldest in Europe).

The region alternated between Christian and Muslim hands during the early Reconquista Period. The city was first conquered by Alfonso I of Asturias in 741, and repopulated in 868 by Alfonso III. It fell into Islamic hands briefly again during the late 10th century, until Ferdinand I of León and Castile conquered the region definitively on 29 November 1057. As a consequence the bishopric was moved after these events (to later be restored in 1071).

In 1128, the nascent national Egas Moniz, had his tenancy in Lamego while his residence was in Britiande, as master of the Riba–Douro, between Paiva and Távora (in addition to the lands of Côa).

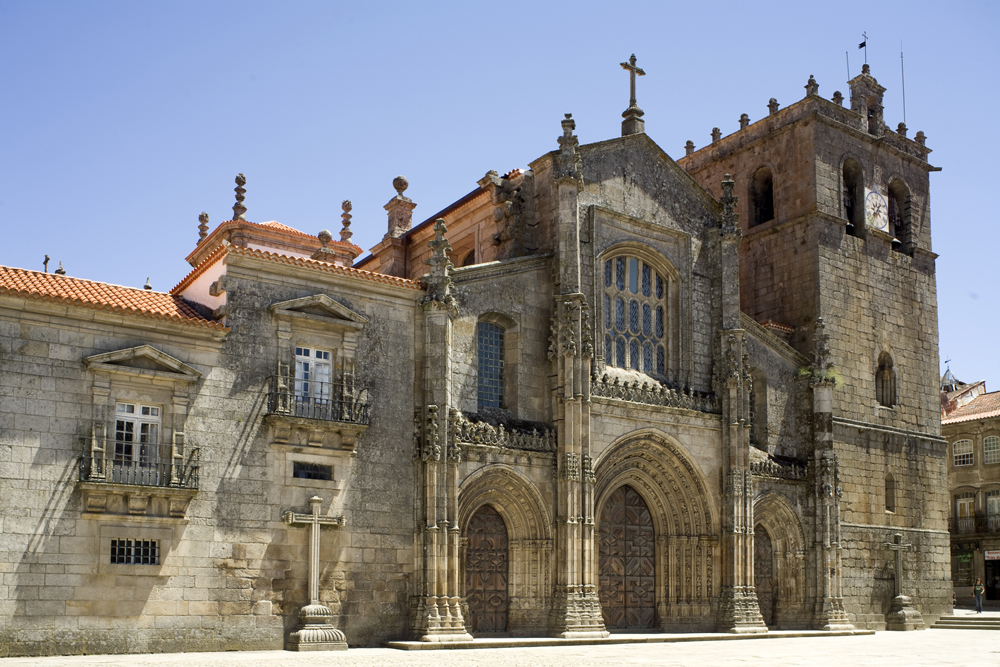
The Cathedral of Our Lady of the Assumption, built in 1129.

The most significant moment in the town's history was in 1139, when nobles declared Afonso Henriques to be Portugal's first king. The town's Gothic cathedral was built by him, although only the Romanesque tower is left from the original building, with its carved Renaissance portal and fine cloister dating from the 16th and 18th centuries. The 12th-century castle preserves a fine keep and a very old and unusual cistern with monograms of master masons.

King Sancho I issued a charter of independence in 1191, as the local community grew around two poles: the ecclesiastical parishes of Sé and Castelo. In 1290, King Denis provided a market charter to the city, attracting merchants from Castile and Granada with their oriental spices and textiles.

Lamego had a privileged positioned on the routes from western Iberia, as a transit point within the settlements of the Além-Douro, Braga and Guimarães, from Alcântara and Mérida to Córdoba and Seville. It was also one of the preferred routes on the Saint James Way pilgrimage to Santiago de Compostela. But, two events changed the economic and social circumstances in the region: the conquest of Granada which drove the last of the Moors from the Peninsula; and the discovery of the maritime connection to India, which resulted in a slow decline for the region.

=== Early modern era ===
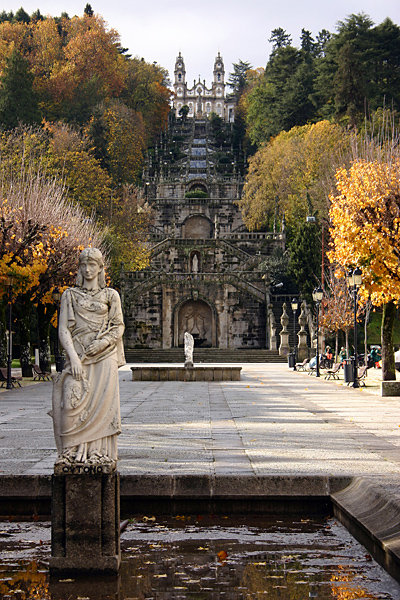
Sanctuary of Our Lady of Remédios, built in 1750.

Manuel I of Portugal issued a foral (charter) in 1514. Also in the 16th century, Manuel de Noronha (one of the more notable prelates of Lamego) was appointed the Bishop of Lamego, occupying the role for the next 18 years and referred to the "great builder", responsible for the cult of Nossa Senhora dos Remédios (Our Lady of Remedies).

In the 17th and 18th century, the solares (country estates) were slowly constructed in Lamego, resulting from the wine commerce down the Douro.

The economic growth of viticulture along the Douro resulted in the issuance of a writ by Sebastião José de Carvalho e Melo, 1st Marquis of Pombal, to designate the area as the Região Demarcada do Douro and the establishment of the Companhia Geral da Agricultura das Vinhas do Alto Douro (General Company of the Wine Agriculture of the Upper Douro).

In 1835, Lamego was the capital of the district, but lost this title to Viseu (December 1835), under the authority of the King's Minister Luís Mouzinho de Albuquerque. In 1919, in an attempt to restore the monarchy, Lamego became the capital of the district for 24 days.

During the second half of the 19th century, during the presidency of the Viscount of Guedes Teixeira, Lamego begins a process of modernization with the construction of new avenues.

After the establishment of the First Republic, during the presidency of Alfredo de Sousa, Lamego undergoes a new phase of building, including the construction a bridge over the Coura River.

== Twin towns – sister cities ==
- Bouchemaine, France

== Geography ==
=== Climate ===
Lamego has a Mediterranean climate with some continental influence; with warm, dry summers and cool, wet winters. The nearest weather station is located in Bigorne, almost 400 m (1,300 ft) higher in altitude, and having cooler temperatures as such. While snowfalls in the city may happen usually no more than once or twice per year, the surrounding mountains often experience significantly more.

Climate data for Bigorne, Lamego, 1961-1990, altitude: ~ 970 m (3,180 ft), precipitation 1981-2019
Month	Jan	Feb	Mar	Apr	May	Jun	Jul	Aug	Sep	Oct	Nov	Dec	Year
Mean daily maximum °C (°F)	6.9 (44.4)	7.9 (46.2)	10.0 (50.0)	12.1 (53.8)	15.3 (59.5)	20.3 (68.5)	23.9 (75.0)	24.1 (75.4)	21.3 (70.3)	15.4 (59.7)	10.1 (50.2)	7.6 (45.7)	14.6 (58.2)
Daily mean °C (°F)	3.6 (38.5)	4.4 (39.9)	6.0 (42.8)	7.7 (45.9)	10.5 (50.9)	14.9 (58.8)	17.6 (63.7)	17.7 (63.9)	15.7 (60.3)	11.2 (52.2)	6.6 (43.9)	4.3 (39.7)	10.0 (50.0)
Mean daily minimum °C (°F)	0.3 (32.5)	0.9 (33.6)	2.0 (35.6)	3.3 (37.9)	5.7 (42.3)	9.4 (48.9)	11.2 (52.2)	11.4 (52.5)	10.1 (50.2)	7.0 (44.6)	3.0 (37.4)	0.9 (33.6)	5.4 (41.8)
Average precipitation mm (inches)	195.6 (7.70)	156.5 (6.16)	115.7 (4.56)	150.9 (5.94)	114.2 (4.50)	46.0 (1.81)	16.3 (0.64)	30.4 (1.20)	91.6 (3.61)	192.4 (7.57)	203.3 (8.00)	266.3 (10.48)	1,579.2 (62.17)
Source: IPMA

=== Human geography ===
Population Growth (1849 - 2011)
Year	Pop.	±%
1801	14,688	—
1849	20,240	+37.8%
1900	31,835	+57.3%
1930	34,730	+9.1%
1960	36,320	+4.6%
1981	32,833	−9.6%
1991	30,164	−8.1%
2001	28,081	−6.9%
2011	26,691	−4.9%

Administratively, the municipality is divided into 18 civil parishes (freguesias):

- Lamego (Almacave e Sé)
- Avões
- Bigorne, Magueija e Pretarouca
- Britiande
- Cambres
- Cepões, Meijinhos e Melcões
- Ferreirim
- Ferreiros de Avões
- Figueira
- Lalim
- Lazarim
- Parada do Bispo e Valdigem
- Penajóia
- Penude
- Samodães
- Sande
- Várzea de Abrunhais
- Vila Nova de Souto d'El-Rei

== Economy ==
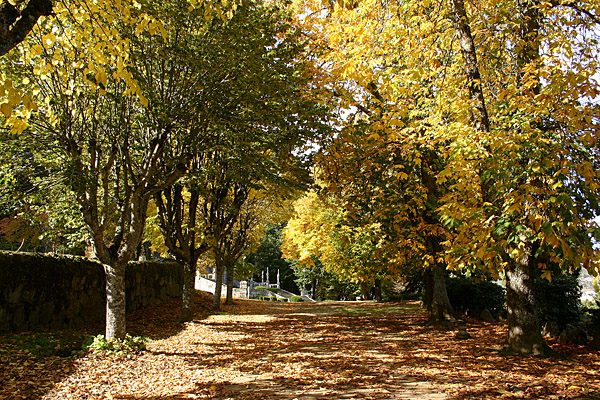
Our Lady of Remédios Park.

The principal activities in this region are tied to the service sector, with commerce and agriculture also representing an important part of the economy. In particular viticulture, since the municipality (and other municipalities in the region) have been designated as part of the Denominação de Origem Controlada (DOC), a control used to classify wine products as a locally produced product of origin, for national and international marketing.

Lamego has a large shopping centre, with approximately 30 main shops, three malls of medium-size and several small traditional shops. Industrial activities are concentrated in the industrial zone in the parish of Várzea de Abrunhais. Local textiles are also promoted but tend to be small-scale production runs, with few medium- to large-companies involved in mass-production. The Portuguese Army's Special Operations regiment is also based in Lamego.

A 686-step staircase leads from the main street to the Baroque church alongside the shrine of Our Lady of Remedies, which has become one of the city's tourist attractions.

The tourist sector is primarily associated with the monuments and religious buildings, and has been a growing part of the local economy. The extension of the A24 motorway has been important in attracting more visitors and businesses to the region.

== Culture ==
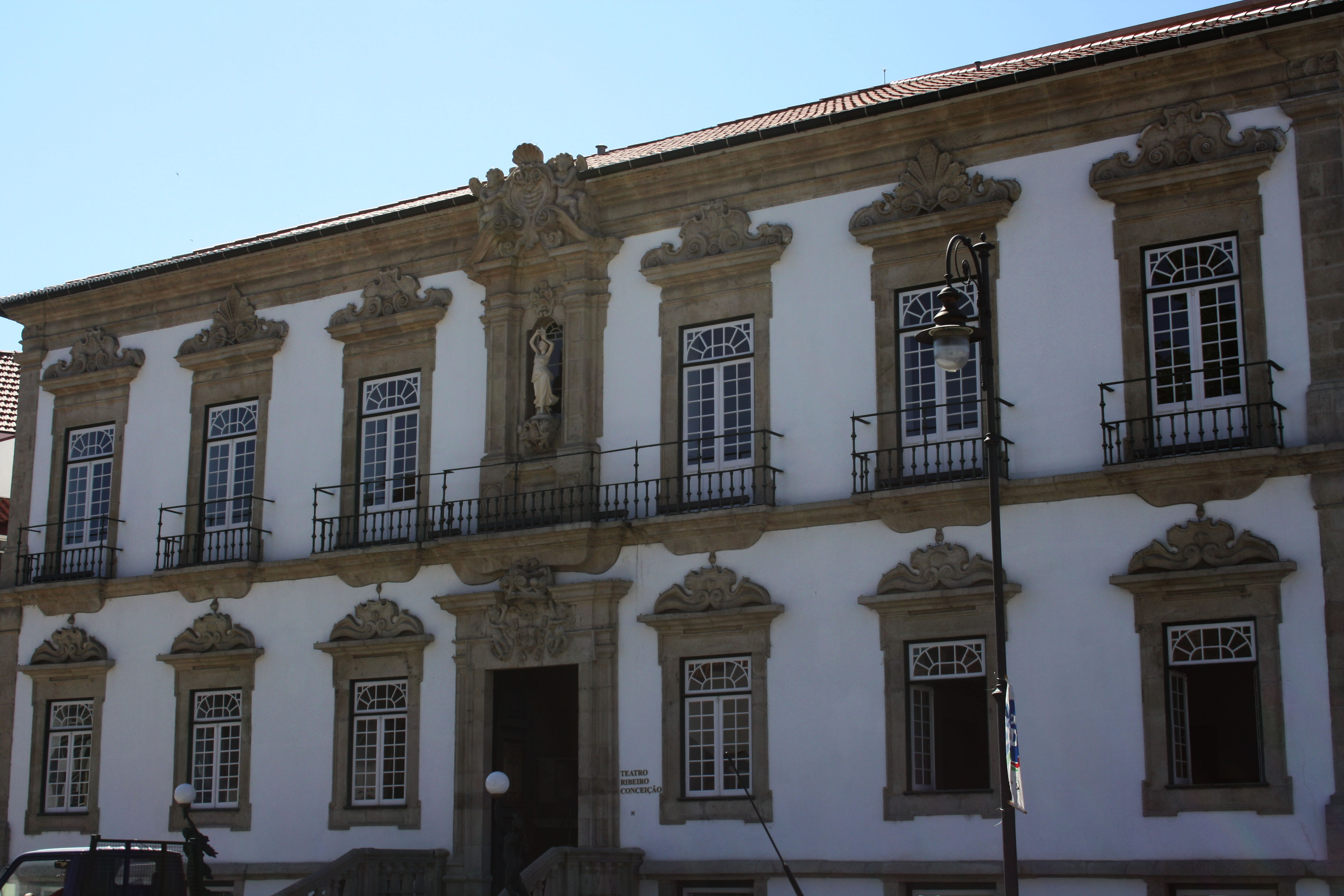
Ribeiro Conceição Theatre.

Lamego is considered one of the principal cities of the Portuguese Baroque, for its numerous churches, palaces, and civic buildings. The city is the seat of the Roman Catholic Diocese of Lamego and has a cathedral.

The following cultural institutions are based in Lamego:

- Ribeiro Conceição Theatre
- Lamego City Museum
- Lamego Municipal Library
- Lamego Image Archive
- Clav'Art
- APC - Amigos Pela Cultura
- ArqDoc – Lamego Document Archive

The film Abraham's Valley (1993) is set in and around Lamego.

== Sports ==
Sporting Clube de Lamego, founded on 4 June 1934 as the branch number 63 of Sporting Clube de Portugal (Sporting CP), is the major sports club in Lamego.

== Notable people ==
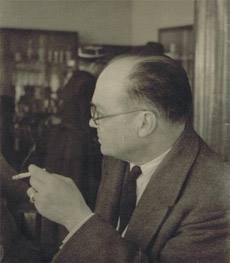
Gentil Guedes Gomes

- Manuel Rodrigues Lamego (born ca.1590) a Marrano merchant and slave trader active in Europe, Africa, Asia and the Americas.
- António de Mendonça (1600–1675) Archbishop of Lisbon, from 1670 to 1675.
- Manuel Pinto da Fonseca (1681–1773) a nobleman, the 68th Grand Master of the Order of Knights of the Hospital of Saint John, from 1741 to 1773.
- Diogo de Carvalho e Sampayo (1750–1807) a nobleman, magistrate, diplomat and scientist.
- José Augusto Guedes Teixeira, (Wiki PT) (1843–1890) Civil Governor of Porto District
- Fausto Guedes Teixeira, (Wiki PT) (1871–1940) contemplative and melancholic lyric poet
- Emília de Sousa Costa (1877-1959) a teacher, feminist and writer of novels
- Gentil Guedes Gomes, (Wiki PT) (1896–1970) lawyer, poet and writer
- Fernando Monteiro de Amaral (1925–2009) 7th President of the Assembly of the Republic
- Mário Lemos Pires (1930–2009) Major-general of the Portuguese Army and last Governor of Portuguese Timor
- João Botelho (born 1949) film director.
- Antônio Rodrigues de Alvarenga (1550–1614), nobleman
- José de Melo e Castro de Abreu (1774–1829), military officer

=== Sport ===
- José Maria Pedroto (1928–1985) footballer for Porto with 227 club caps and 17 for Portugal
- Álvaro Magalhães (born 1961) footballer for Benfica with 293 club caps and 20 for Portugal
- Jorge Silva (born 1972) a retired footballer with 382 club caps
- Chico Silva (born 1978) a retired footballer with 311 club caps
- Gonçalo Santos (born 1986) a footballer with 350 club caps, Benfica assistant coach
- Afonso Moreira (born 2005) footballer for Bayer Leverkusen
