= José de Melo e Castro de Abreu =

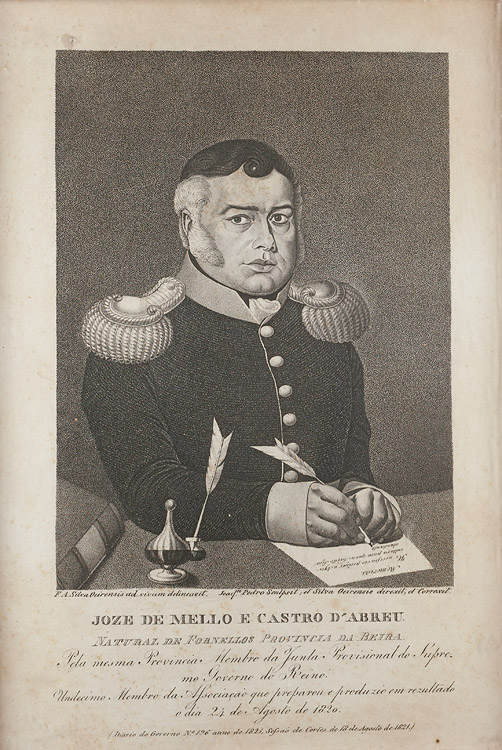

Military Governor of Beira Alta
- In office 1810

Personal details
- Born: September 27, 1774 Lamego, Portugal
- Died: March 15, 1829 (aged 54) Lisbon, Portugal
- Occupation: Military officer; provincial administrator

Military service
- Allegiance: Portugal
- Branch/service: Portuguese Army
- Years of service: 1790–1823
- Rank: Donatary captain

José de Melo e Castro de Abreu Pinto Pereira d'Eça (September 27, 1774 – March 15, 1829) was a Portuguese military officer and revolutionary, serving in various public offices upon the conclusion of the Liberal Revolution of 1820, in which he played a pivotal role.

== Biography ==
De Abreu was born on September 27, 1774 into nobility, in the diocese of Lamego. A noble student of the royal house, he would become a cadet of the Tondela Regiment. Later, on June 24, 1806, he was promoted to the position of colonel.

He continued to rise the ranks—being appointed as a captain-major and military governor of Beira Alta.

In June 1820, during the Liberal Revolution of 1820, as a colonel of the militias of Porto, he was the eleventh person to join the Synod, a group of revolutionary leaders who helped to push forward the constitutional changes that would lead to the establishment of a constitutional monarchy. Upon the rebels' victory, de Abreu served in several positions in the new provisional government.

== Personal life ==
De Abreu was a Freemason; he died on March 15, 1829, at the age of 54.
