= Diogo de Carvalho e Sampayo =

Portuguese nobleman, diplomat and scientist

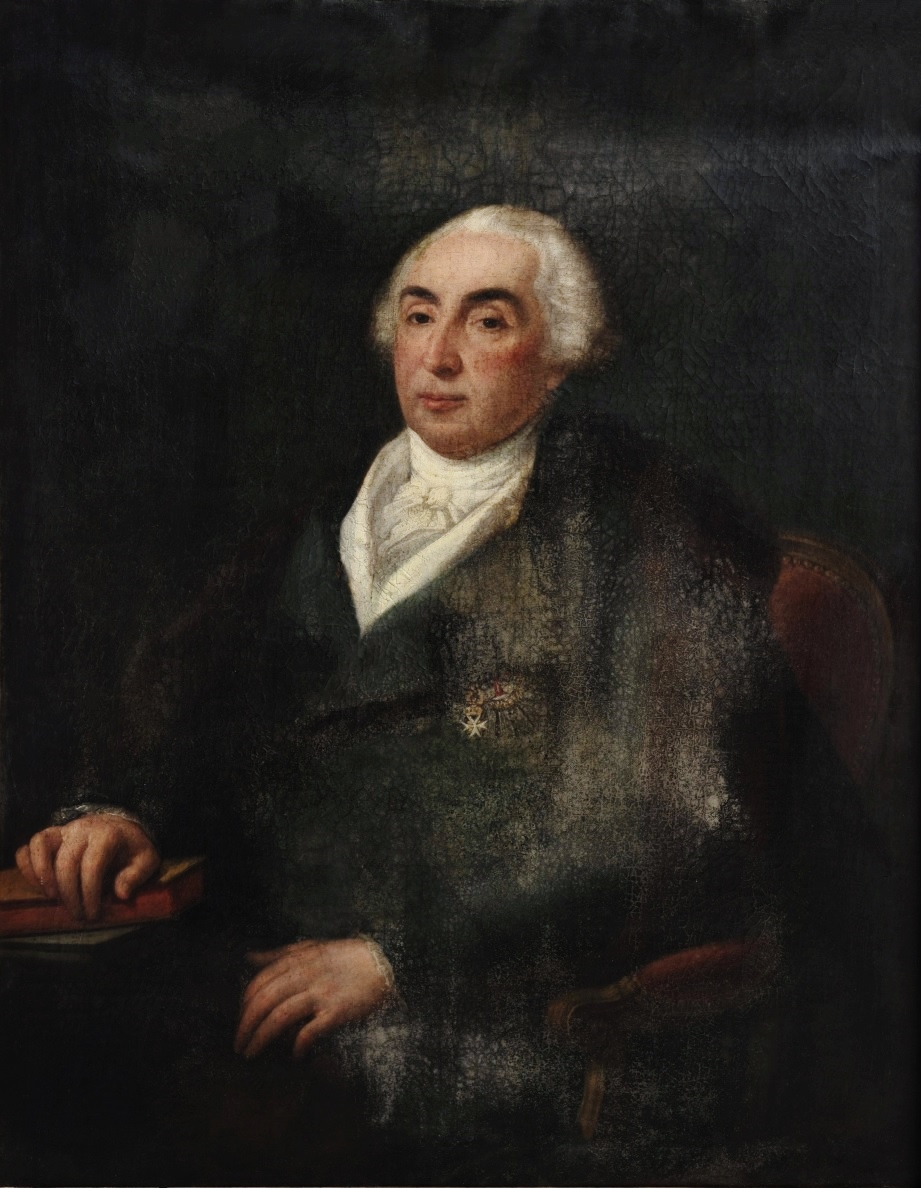
- Diogo de Carvalho e Sampayo
- Born: 28 May 1750; Casa do Poço, Lamego, Portugal
- Died: 29 December 1807 (aged 57); Casa do Poço, Lamego, Portugal
- Resting place: Lamego Cathedral
- Education: University of Coimbra
- Spouse: Maria Cândida de Albergaria e Vasconcelos (m. 1806)
- Scientific career
- Fields: Optics, colour theory

Diogo de Carvalho e Sampayo (28 May 1750 – 29 December 1807) was a Portuguese nobleman, magistrate, diplomat and scientist. A knight of the Order of Malta and a judge by profession, Carvalho e Sampayo became notable as an amateur scientist who authored two important works on the subject of chromatics.

== Biography ==
Carvalho e Sampayo was born in the Casa do Poço, a manor house in the city of Lamego, Portugal, to Diogo Lopes de Carvalho and Catarina Teresa de Vasconcelos, of a prominent gentry family. He graduated from the University of Coimbra where he studied Law, later, in 1783, serving as a judge in Viana do Castelo. He resigned from his post after a conflict with the administrative authorities of the nearby town of Vila do Conde.

At age 35, he joined the Order of Malta, and it was around this time, during his stay in Malta, that he started working on colour problems and ended up writing two books on the subject in rapid succession: the first was published in 1787, under the title Tratado das Cores ("A Treatise on Colours"); the second, in 1788, was titled Dissertação sobre as Cores Primitivas ("A Dissertation on Primitive Colours").

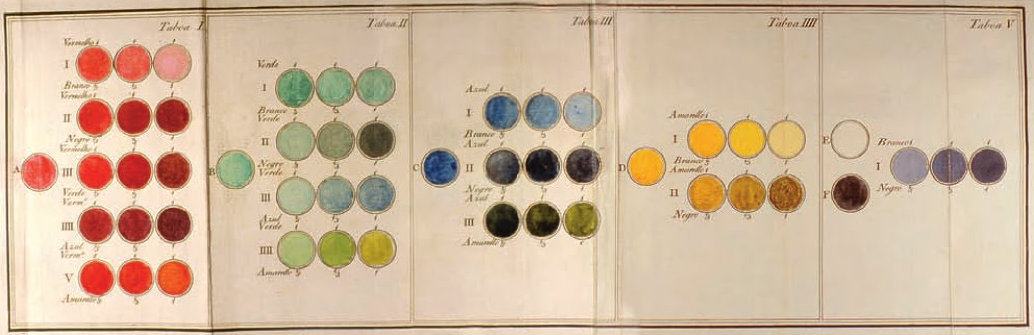
Sampayo's 15 linear scales in Dissertação sobre as Cores Primitivas, 1788

Sampayo devised a system of six simple colours (white, black, yellow, red, blue, and green), which he called generic colours, and combined each colour with the other five colours in turn, each combination having three intermediate grades, resulting in four steps: this would generate 15 linear scales. Sampayo's system is the first fully coloured system of one-dimensional simple hue and tint/shade scales as well as a gray scale. Johann Wolfgang von Goethe was familiar with Carvalho e Sampayo's work: his seminal treatise Theory of Colours (published 1810) includes a general assessment of Sampayo's 1791 book Memória sobre a Formação Natural das Cores ("An Essay on the Natural Formation of Colours").

Starting in 1789, he moved to Madrid where he headed the Portuguese diplomatic representation there, first as chargé d'affaires, then as a minister plenipotentiary, and finally as ambassador extraordinary, returning definitely to Portugal in 1801. In Madrid, Carvalho e Sampayo made acquaintance with Wilhelm von Humboldt.
