= Chapel of São Pedro de Balsemão =

- Capela de São Pedro de Balsemão
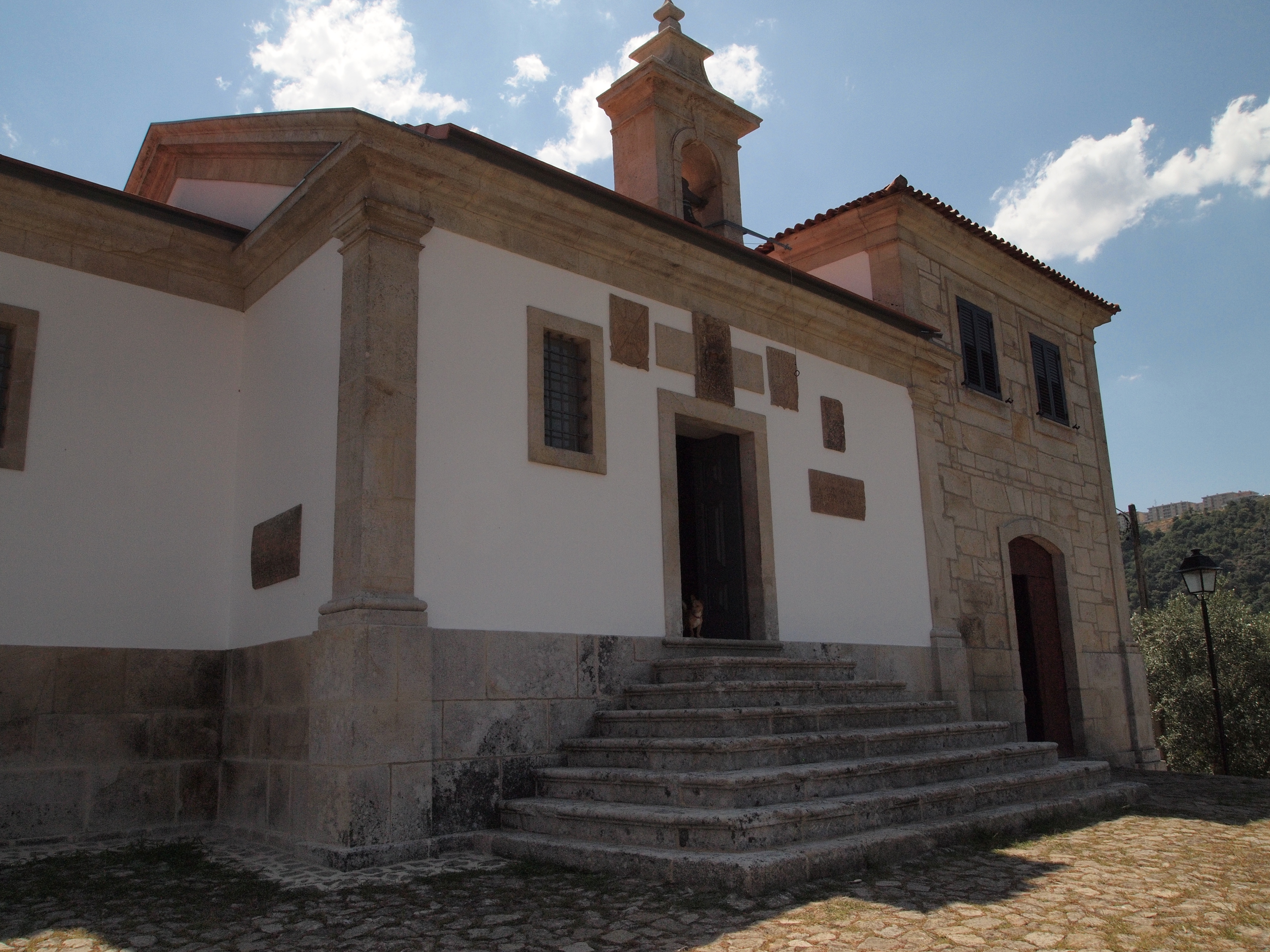
- The exterior entrance to the Chapel of São Pedro, the Visigothic sanctuary which was converted over time to Baroque style
- Interactive map of the Chapel of São Pedro de Balsemão area

General information
- Type: Chapel
- Architectural style: Romanesque
- Location: Sé, Lamego, Portugal
- Coordinates: 41°6′25.17″N 7°46′58.99″W
- Opened: c. 588
- Owner: Estado Portugues

Technical details
- Material: Granite

The small Chapel of Sao Pedro de Balsemao, is situated in the civil parish of Sé, municipality of Lamego in the northern region of Portugal. It was a Visigothic sanctuary dating back to the 7th century, although it has Baroque elements, in particular, in the South Gate and the western facade, which adjoins a later residential building.

== History ==
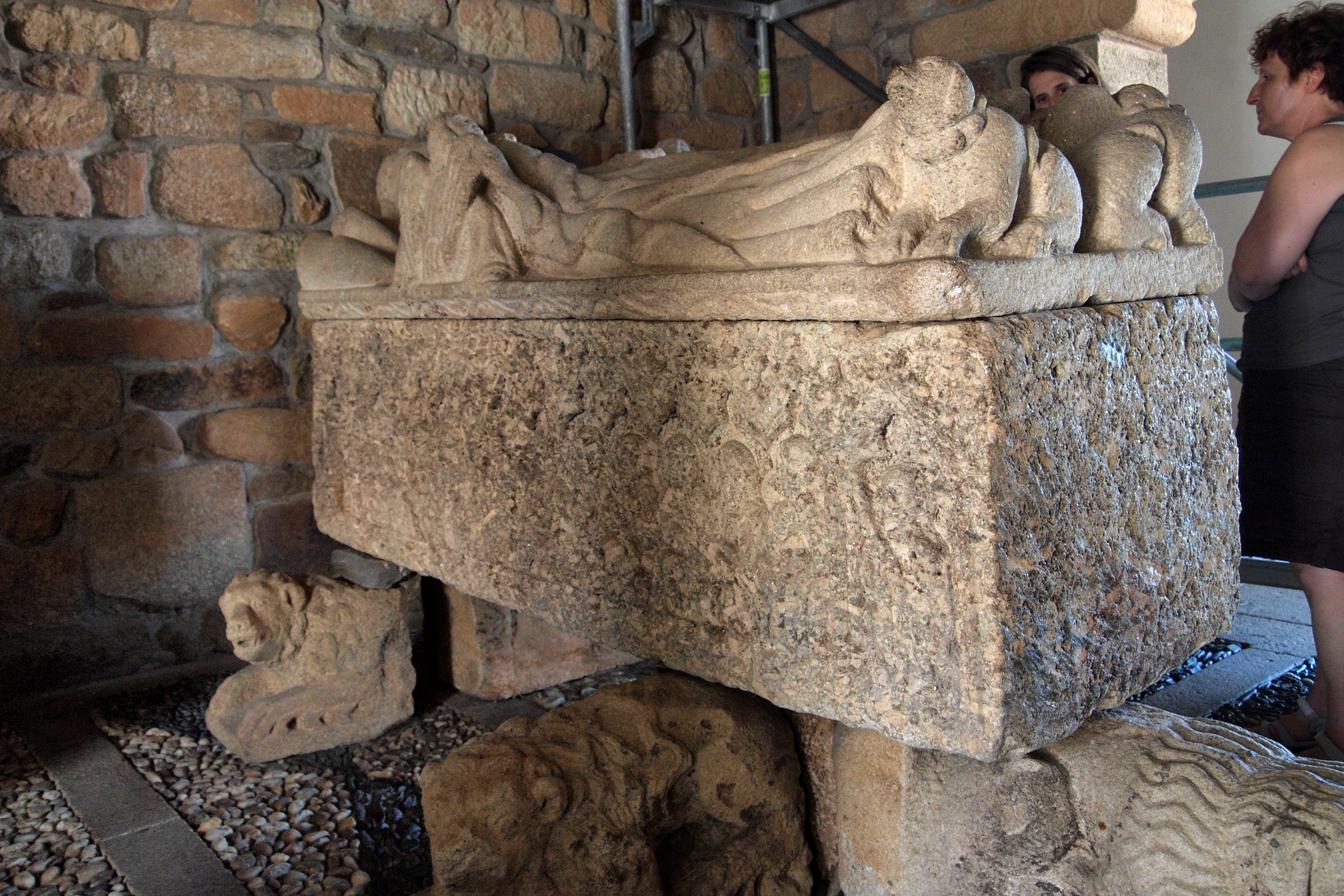
The sarcophagus of D. Afonso Pires, former Bishop of Porto

The chapel encompasses a period of both Visigothic dominance (6th–7th century) and the expansion of the Kingdom of Asturias (9th–10th century) .

In the location of the chapel, or relatively close by, was a Roman villa, which can be dated from some terminus augustalis inscriptions from the period of Claudius on parts of the building which were later used as altars.

The construction of the chapel occurred in an undetermined point in the high Middle Ages. Defenders of the Visigothic chronology of events, point to an inscription dated from 588. Other arguments, enunciated by Lampérez y Romea, point to the triumphal arch and basilica-like plan that was adapted to favour its Visigothic origins. The idea of a 6th–7th century church gained favour directly and was repeated by other authors, such as Schlunk, Fernando de Almeida and Hauschild, among others. But in recent years, the hypothesis that the church was a 9th or early 10th century construction has been advanced. First, by Joaquim de Vasconcelos, who used the church of São Pedro de Lourosa (dated 912), but later by Real, Ferreira de Almeida, Barroca and Teixeira, in addition to others.

By the 6th century, Balsemão was already an ecclesiastical parish.

In the 10th century, with the repopulation of the area, the church was renovated. The details of this are not fully understood, but there are indications that it amounted to general maintenance of the existing structure.

During the 13th century Inquirições, the area was identified in records establishing the existence of the parochial sanctuary.

In 1562, the construction of the altar in the name of Santa Maria was completed, under the direction of the head of the Quinta da Régua, Bishop Afonso Pires. In the early Middle Ages the church was the see of the Porto Bishop D. Afonso Pires, who was, upon his death buried in the apse in a Gothic tomb supported by sculptures depicting of Calvary.

The church was profoundly transformed after the 14th century, when the Bishop of Porto, Afonso Pires, selected the chapel to bury his earthly remains, "redoing the church entirely". In addition to his sarcophagus, today located in the principal nave, there are few remnants of this changes, which (by 1643) Luís Pinto de Sousa Coutinho had integrated into his estate. The new landowner was also responsible for restoring and integrating the styles of his mansion with the chapel, expanding the staircase and affixing heraldic arms on the principal façade. He also reconstructed the building, converting the medieval chapel's exterior into a 17th-century building.

By the 18th century, the chapel was used as a family vault of the land owners. It was restored in the mid-20th century.

On 14 September 1981, the property was transferred into the hands of the IPPAR Instituto Português do Património Arquitectónico, forerunner of the IGESPAR Instituto de Gestão do Património Arquitectónico e Arqueológico.

== Architecture ==
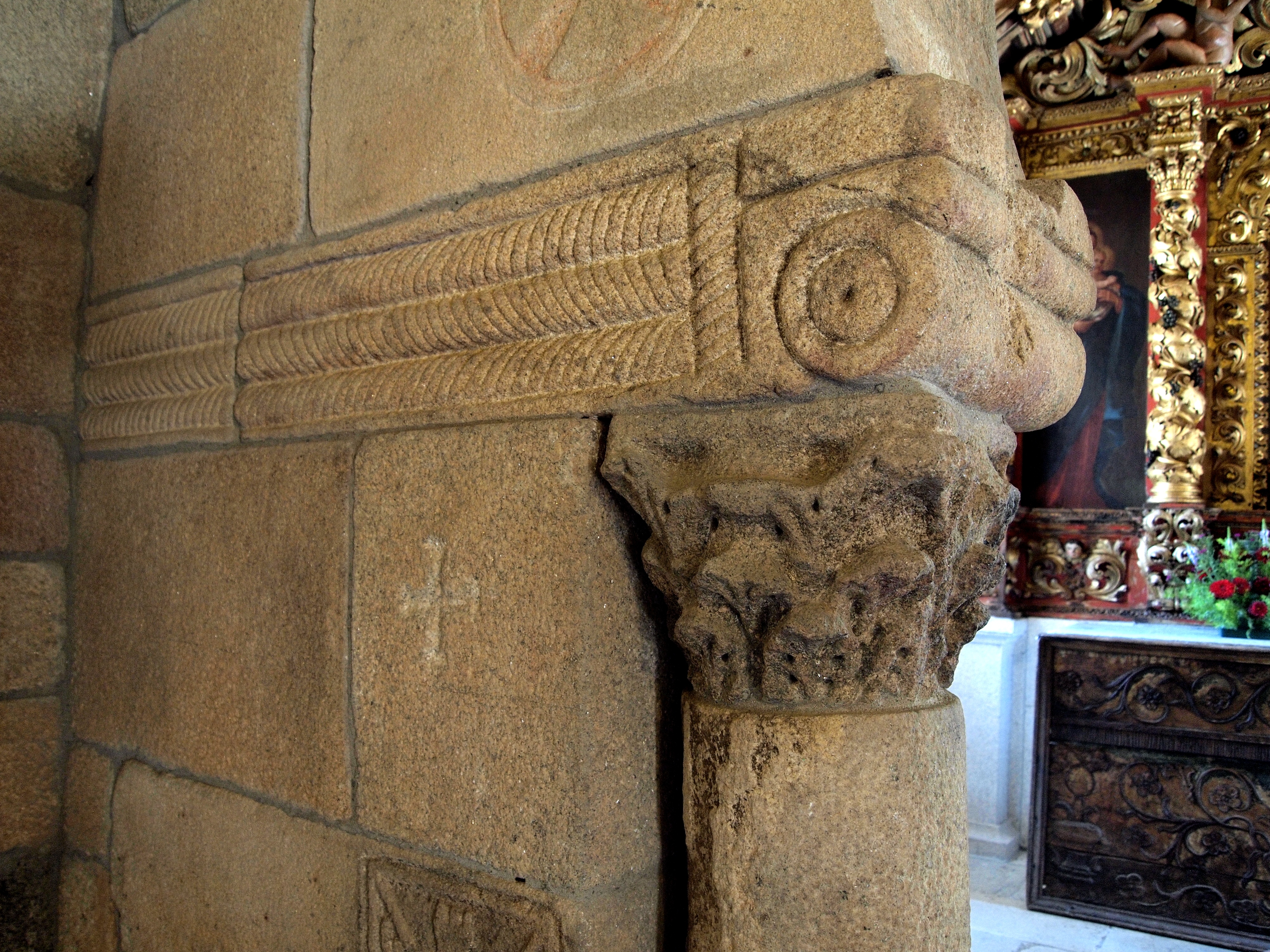
Detail from one of the doors, with frieze and pillar

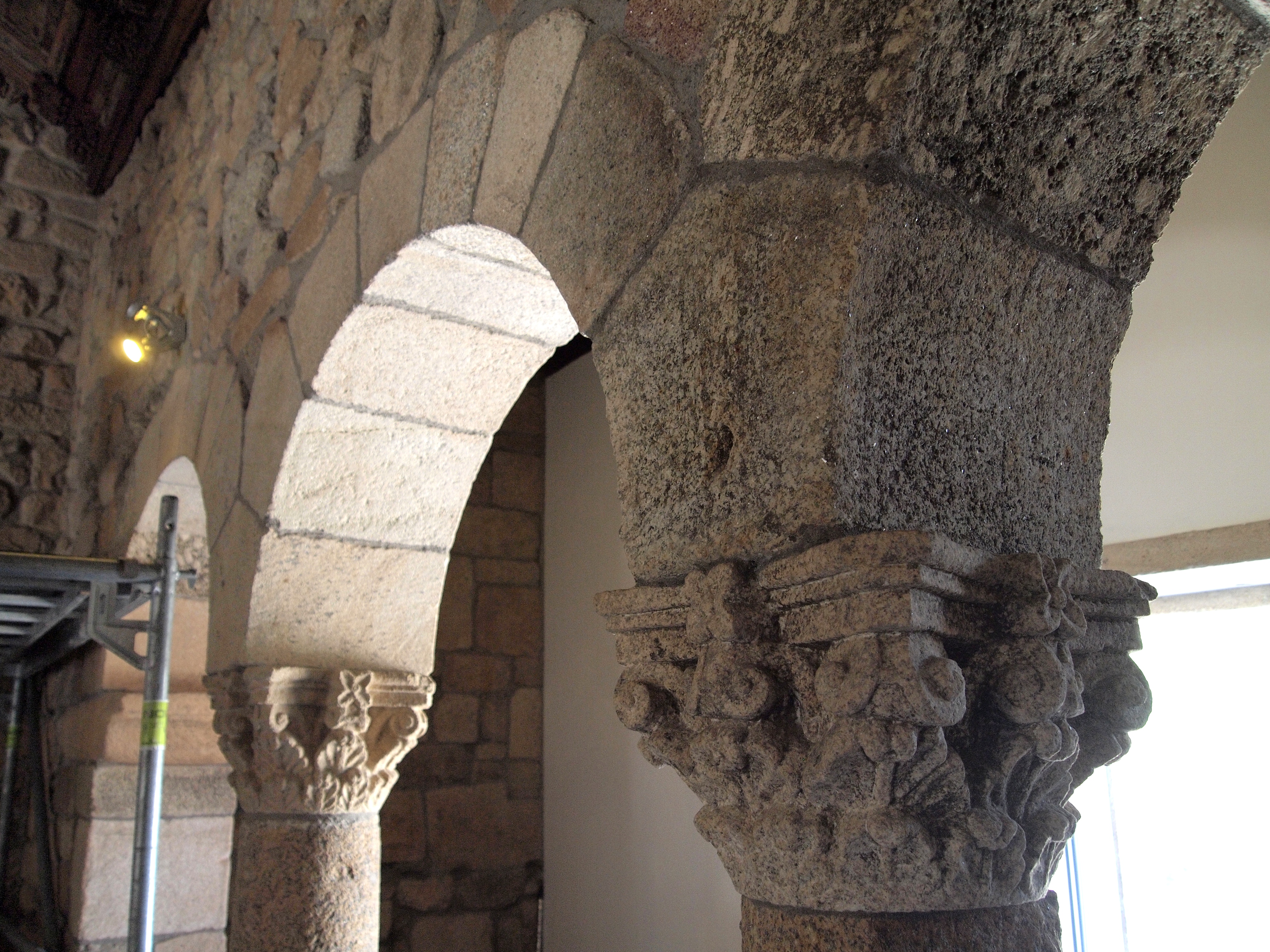
The ornate Corinthian pillar dividing the apse

The chapel is located on Rua Cardoso Avelino and the Largo do Desterro, which is accessed from the Rua da Calçada, some 3.2 kilometres along the Rua da Calçada-Lamego municipal road that winds along the river (before the village bridge). It is rural area, on a semi-embankment, partially buttressed by the old convent, and the Solar dos Pintos building. It is separated by a courtyard and rural road.

The chapel consists of a regular, longitudinal plan (sideways "T"), with articulated volumes covered in rounded tile. The principal entrance is the side entryway to the three nave body, which is flanked by square corner pilasters, surmounted by a small bell-tower over the door. To the left, the smaller annex is actually the chapel's altar and retable, slightly recessed from the entrance (the tail of the "T"), while to the right of this structure, is the Solar dos Pintos; a larger two-story building with massive portico, surmounted by two visible windows. Above the main entrance way to the chapel are three coat of arms, within square granite slabs, and two Romanesque inscriptions (on the right side of the doorway), while the whole ensemble is decorated with cornices. Access to the chapel is made by four-step staircase on either side of the building.

The surviving elements of the original structure include the general arrangement of the interior: three naves separated by three ultra-semicircular arches over Corinthian capitals, and the apse formed of a single rectangular chapel. The many geometrical decorative elements are also original and more numerous than those of any other Iberian monument of the period. The interior is divided into three sections supported by three arcs, supported by cylindrical columns, with polymorphic capitals. A triumphal arch divides the chapel from the main altar, while the roofs are supported by beam timbers. The high altar is decorated in a carved-wooden retable, gilded in gold, with an image of Saint Peter over the altar. The naves on either side of the main altar are decorated with carved-wooden chapels covered in gold.

In addition, a carved sarcophagus mounted on cavalry, with the statue of Bishop D. Afonso Pires occupies the central nave of the chapel.

Although the chapel is open to visitors, photo-taking is restricted by the IGESPAR.
