= 1680s =

Decade

The 1680s decade ran from January 1, 1680, to December 31, 1689.

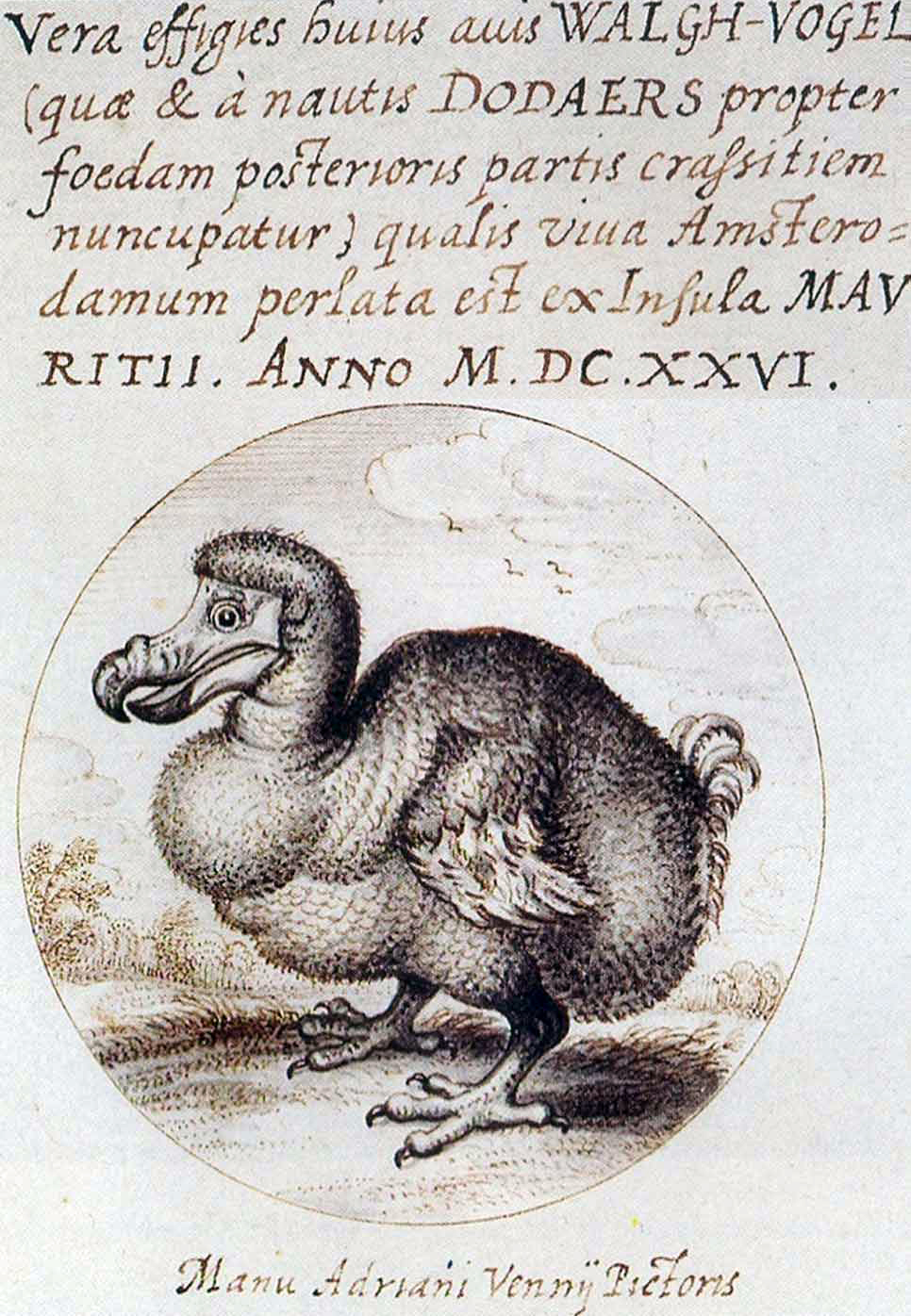
In 1681, the last dodo was killed.

== Events ==
=== 1680 ===
==== January–March ====
- January 2 – King Amangkurat II of Mataram (located on the island of Java, part of modern-day Indonesia), invites Trunajaya, who had led a failed rebellion against him until his surrender on December 26, for a ceremonial visit to the royal palace. After Trunajaya arrives, King Amangkurat stabs his guest to death.
- January 24 – William Harris, one of the four English Puritans who established the Plymouth Colony and then the Providence Plantations at Rhode Island in 1636, is captured by Algerian pirates, when his ship is boarded while he is making a voyage back to England. After being sold into slavery on February 23, he remains a slave until ransom is paid. He dies in 1681, three days after his return to England.
- February 12 – The Marquis de Croissy, Charles Colbert, becomes France's Minister of Foreign Affairs and serves for 16 years until his death, when he is succeeded as Foreign Minister by his son Jean-Baptiste Colbert.
- February 16 – Rev. Ralph Davenant's will provides for foundation of the Davenant Foundation School for poor boys in Whitechapel, in the East End of London.
- February 22 – Catherine Deshayes Monvoisin, a fortune teller in France who organized a ring of killers in what became known as the "Affair of the Poisons" that killed at least 1,000 people, is burned at the stake after being convicted of witchcraft. In all, 36 people are executed for their role in the poisoning.
- February 24 – The German Duchy of Saxe-Coburg is divided by treaty among the sons of the late Ernest I, Duke of Saxe-Gotha, who had died in 1675. The oldest son, Frederick, receives Saxe-Gotha-Altenburg. The rest is divided among Albert (Duke of Saxe-Coburg); Bernhard (Saxe-Meiningen); Henry (Saxe-Römhild); Christian (Saxe-Eisenberg); Ernest (Saxe-Hildburghausen); and John Ernest (Saxe-Coburg-Saalfeld).
- March 24 – The Earl of Shaftesbury informs the Privy Council of England that the Roman Catholics of Ireland were about to launch a rebellion, backed by France. The investigation leads to the arrest and ultimate execution of the Roman Catholic Archbishop of Armagh, Oliver Plunkett.
- March 25 – Troops sent by the Sultan of Morocco, Ismail Ibn Sharif, begin a blockade of the port of Tangier, occupied by the English and located on the North African coast. Palmes Fairborne is dispatched to defend Tangier as the colonial governor and commander-in-chief of English forces.
- March 27 – The London Penny Post delivery service begins operations after being created by Robert Murray and William Dockwra, with a policy of delivering letters to any part of London or its suburbs for the price of one English penny.
- March 30 – A total eclipse of the Sun takes place and is visible over central Africa, with totality over the Opala Territory in the modern-day Democratic Republic of the Congo.

==== April–June ====
- April 21 – Prince Rajaram Bhosle, the 10-year-old son of the Shivaji, the Chhatrapati (Emperor) of the Maratha Empire in India, is installed on the throne as the new Emperor, less than three weeks after the death of his father. Sambhaji Bhosle, the eldest son of Shivaji, learns the news while imprisoned at Panhala and makes plans to escape prison and take over the throne.
- April 27 – Prince Sambhaji and fellow prisoners kill the commander of the Panhala prison and take control of the fort, as he makes plans to become ruler of the Maratha Empire.
- April 30 – The first French Huguenots in the New World arrive at Charleston, South Carolina, as 45 of the religious exiles arrive at Oyster Point on the ship Richmond, after being sent there by King Charles II of England.
- May 6 – King Charles XI of Sweden marries Princess Elonora, daughter of the late King Frederick III of Denmark-Norway and sister of King Christian V.
- May – The volcano Krakatoa erupts, probably on a relatively small scale.
- June 4 – Tokugawa Tsunayoshi becomes the new Shōgun of Japan upon the death of his older brother, Tokugawa Ietsuna, who had been shōgun for 29 years.
- June 10 – England and Spain sign a mutual defense treaty.
- June 11 – Elizabeth Cellier, an English Catholic midwife, is tried and acquitted of treason for pamphleting against the government.
- June 16 – Sambhaji Bhosle and his troops capture Raigad, the capital of the Maratha Empire and Sambhaji becomes the new Chhatrapati or Emperor. Sambhaji deposes his younger brother Rajaram I and places Rajaram and Rajaram's mother under house arrest.
- June 22 – The Sanquhar Declaration, written by Richard Cameron, leader of the Covenanters who oppose the control of religion in Scotland by King Charles, is read aloud by Richard's brother Michael Cameron at the public square in the village of Sanquhar in Dumfriesshire.
- June 30 – During the Spanish Inquisition, an auto-da-fé takes place in the Plaza Mayor, Madrid.

==== July–September ====
- July 8 – The first documented tornado in America kills a servant at Cambridge, Massachusetts.
- August 10 – A Pueblo medicine man named Popé begins an attack by the Puebloans and their Apache allies on Spanish outposts throughout what is the modern-day U.S. state of New Mexico, choosing the campaign to begin before a supply caravan can reach the Spaniards.
- August 20 (August 10 Old Style) – The settlement of Karlskrona in Sweden is founded, as the Royal Swedish Navy relocates there.
- August 21 – In the Pueblo Revolt, the native Pueblo people capture Santa Fe (now in New Mexico) from the Spanish colonists.
- August 24 – Comédie-Française is founded by decree of Louis XIV of France as La maison de Molière in Paris.
- September 15
  - A four month truce between England and Morocco expires and the Alcaid Omar, Viceroy of Morocco, begins a bombardment of the English fort at Tangier.
  - A treaty is concluded between the Dutch Republic and the Ottoman Empire for Ottoman Sultan Mehmed IV and his subjects to apply Dutch law to Dutch visitors to Ottoman territory.
- September 21 – Spanish troops make a counterattack on Santa Fe in the modern-day U.S. state of New Mexico, allowing the remaining Spanish troops in the besieged city to flee to El Paso (now in Texas).
- September 30 – Robert Boyle, having rediscovered the process of manufacturing phosphorus from bone ash, deposits his summary of the directions with The Royal Society of London for Improving Natural Knowledge. Boyle's assistant, Ambrose Godfrey, later develops Boyle's discovery to produce phosphorus commercially.

==== October–December ====
- October 9 – A massive 9.0 magnitude M_{w} earthquake destroys part of Málaga and other cities in the province of the same name.
- October 29 – At the request of King Charles XI of Sweden, the Riksdag in Sweden enacts the Great Reduction, returning fiefs which had been granted to the Swedish nobility to the Crown. The nation becomes an absolute monarchy under the rule of Charles.
- November 14 – The Great Comet of 1680 is first sighted by Gottfried Kirch, the first comet discovered by telescope.
- November 17 – The Green Ribbon Club, a predecessor of the British Whigs, organizes a procession to burn an effigy of the Pope in London for the second year running.
- December 17 (December 7 O.S.) – The trial for treason of William Howard, 1st Viscount Stafford before his fellow members of the House of Lords having concluded after seven days, the Lords vote on whether to convict him of the articles of impeachment. The Lords vote, 55 to 31 to convict him and to impose the death sentence and Lord Stafford is beheaded on 29 December (8 January 1681 N.S.)

==== Date unknown ====
- Chambers of Reunion (French courts under Louis XIV) decide on the complete annexation of Alsace.
- The first Portuguese governor is appointed to Macau.
- Johann Pachelbel writes his Canon in D Major

=== 1681 ===
==== January–March ====
- January 1 – Prince Muhammad Akbar, son of the Mughal Emperor Aurangzeb, initiates a civil war in India. With the support of troops from the Rajput states, Akbar declares himself the new Mughal Emperor and prepares to fight his father, but is ultimately defeated.
- January 3 – The Treaty of Bakhchisarai is signed, between the Ottoman vassal Crimean Khanate and the Russian Empire.
- January 18 – The "Exclusion Bill Parliament", summoned by King Charles II of England in October, is dissolved after three months, with directions that new elections be held, and that a new parliament be convened in March in Oxford.
- February 2 – In India, the Mughal Empire city of Burhanpur (now in the Indian state of Madhya Pradesh) is sacked and looted by troops of the Maratha Empire on orders of the Maratha emperor, the Chhatrapati Sambhaji. General Hambirrao Mohite began the pillaging three days earlier.
- March 4 – In order to settle a debt of £16,000, King Charles II of England grants a land charter to William Penn, for territory west of Delaware River in America between 40° N and 42° N, later to be called Pennsylvania.
- March 21 – The "Oxford Parliament" is summoned in England by King Charles II and meets in Oxford rather than in Westminster, but is dissolved seven days later. No further sessions of parliament are held until after the death of Charles in 1685.

==== April–June ====
- April 11 – Following the death of its last count, the Palatinate-Landsberg passes to the King of Sweden.
- May 15 – The Canal du Midi in France is opened officially, as the Canal Royal de Languedoc.
- June 23 – The Church of the East, an Eastern Orthodox rite in Mesopotamia (now Iraq), already split between two patriarchs in the Eliya line and the Shimun line, is split along a third line by the Roman Catholic Church when Mar Yousip of the Archdiocese of Amid (now Diyarbakır in Turkey) is proclaimed by Pope Innocent XI as Joseph I, "Patriarch of the Chaldean nation deprived of its patriarch", creating the "Josephite line" of the Chaldean Catholic Church.

==== July–September ====
- July 1 – Oliver Plunkett, Roman Catholic Archbishop of Armagh and Primate of All Ireland, falsely convicted in June of treason, is hanged, drawn and quartered at Tyburn, London, the last Catholic martyr to die in England; he is canonised in 1975.
- July 23 – The Bombardment of Chios during the French-Tripolitania War (1681-1685) is part of a wider campaign by France against the Barbary Pirates in the 1680s.
- August 10 – English sea captain Robert Knox of the East India Company publishes his book An Historical Relation of the Island Ceylon, about his adventures, 20-years imprisonment and escape from Ceylon.
- August 12 – Ahom King Gadadhar Singha (or Gadapani), who takes the Tai name Supaatphaa, ascends the throne.
- August 31 – English perjurer Titus Oates is told to leave his state apartments in Whitehall; his fame begins to wane, and he is soon arrested and imprisoned for sedition.
- September 30 – France annexes the city of Strasbourg (German: Strassburg), previously a free imperial city of the Holy Roman Empire.

==== October–December ====
- October 27 – Sir John Child of England becomes the new Governor of Bombay province and, unofficially, Governor-General of all of the settlements of the East India Company in India. With the exception of a rebellion by Captain Richard Keigwin during the year 1684, Child expands British control until involving the British in a war with the Mughal Empire.
- November 20 – Don Melchor de Navarra, Duke of Palata arrives in Lima after a voyage of almost 10 months from Spain and becomes the new Viceroy of Peru, succeeding the Archbishop of Lima, Melchor Liñán y Cisneros, who had administered the area since 1678.
- November 25 – Cornelis Speelman of the Netherlands becomes the new Governor-General of the Dutch East Indies (now Indonesia) and concludes an alliance with the Sultan Amangkurat II of the Mataram Sultanate on the island of Java, then uses the Dutch Army to suppress the rebellion started by the Sultan's half-brother, Prince Puger. Puger surrenders on November 28 to the ranking Dutch officer, Jacob Couper.
- November 29 – A storm strikes the Isthmus of Panama and overwhelms the Spanish Navy's Flota de Tierra Firma, sinking the ship Nuestra Señora de Encarnación in the Chagres River. The Encarnación wreckage is not found until almost 340 years later, in 2011, mostly intact and still loaded with most of its cargo.
- December 3 – Another ship in the Flota de Terra Firma, Nuestra Señora de la Soledad, sinks in the Chagres River with the loss of its 280 crew.
- December 7 – Wu Shifan, grandson of Chinese general Wu Sangui, commits suicide at Kunming in Yunnan province, ending the 8-year Revolt of the Three Feudatories against the Kangxi Emperor and the Qing dynasty in China.
- December 22 – King Charles II of England signs a warrant for the building of the Royal Hospital Chelsea in London for wounded and retired soldiers.

==== Date unknown ====
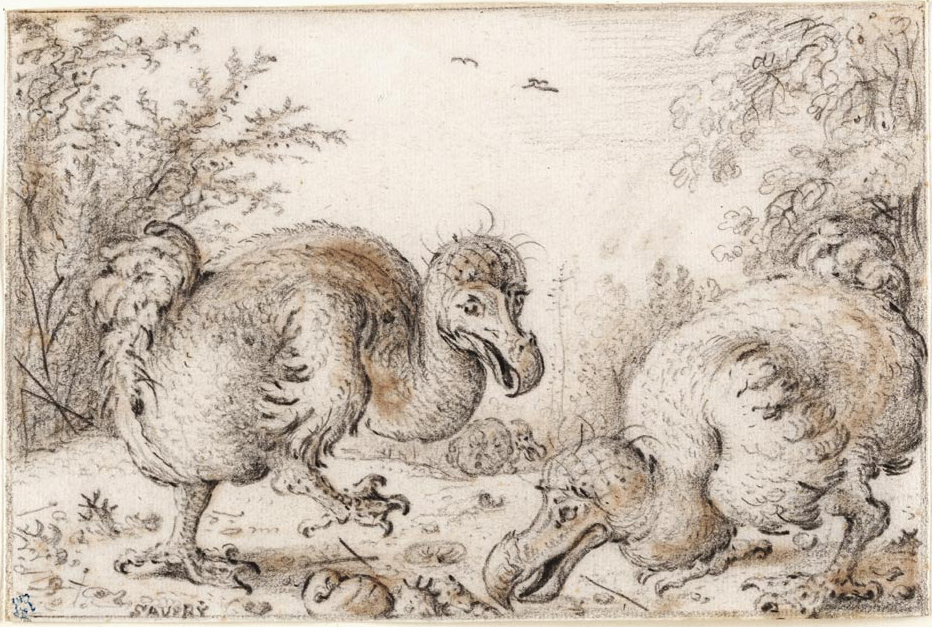
Savery sketch of three dodos from c. 1626, Crocker Art Gallery

- Collections are made in England for needy French refugees.
- Havertown and Bryn Mawr are founded in Pennsylvania by Welsh Quakers.
- The bell Emmanuel in Notre-Dame de Paris is recast.
- The Port of Honfleur, France, is re-modelled by Abraham Duquesne.
- The basilica of Santa Maria della Salute in Venice, designed by Baldassare Longhena in 1631, is dedicated.
- The dodo becomes extinct.

=== 1682 ===
==== January–March ====
- January 7 – The Republic of Genoa forbids the unauthorized printing of newspapers and all handwritten newssheets; the ban is lifted after three months.
- January 12 – Scottish minister James Renwick, one of the Covenanters resisting the Scottish government's suppression of alternate religious views, publishes the Declaration of Lanark.
- January 21 – The Ottoman Empire army is mobilized in preparation for a war against Austria that culminates with the 1683 Battle of Vienna.
- January 24 – The first public theater in Brussels, the Opéra du Quai au Foin, is opened.
- February 5 – In Japan, on the 28th day of the 12th month in the year Tenna 1, a major fire sweeps through Edo (now Tokyo).
- February 9 – Thomas Otway's classic play Venice Preserv'd or A Plot Discover'd is given its first performance, premiering at the Duke's Theatre.
- March 11 – Work begins on construction of the Royal Hospital Chelsea for old soldiers in London, England.

==== April–June ====
- April 7 – René-Robert Cavelier, Sieur de La Salle, exploring rivers in America, reaches the mouth of the Mississippi River.
- April 9 – At the mouth of the Mississippi River, near modern Venice, Louisiana, Robert de La Salle buries an engraved plate and a cross, claiming the territory as La Louisiane for France.
- May 6 – Louis XIV of France moves his court to Versailles.
- May 7 (April 27 O.S.) – Upon the death of the Tsar Feodor III of Russia, Feodor's younger brother, 15-year-old Ivan is passed over in favor of a half-brother, 10-year-old Peter.
- May 11 – The Moscow uprising of 1682 occurs when a mob, outraged by the rejection of Prince Ivan and upset over rumors that Ivan has been strangled, invades the Kremlin and lynches the leading boyars and military commanders. Ivan V and Peter I are named co-rulers of Russia as a result of a compromise between Peter's mother Natalya Naryshkina and Ivan's mother Maria Miloslavskaya and both are crowned a month later.
- June 8 – The English trading freighter Johanna is wrecked off of the coast of South Africa with the loss of 10 of her 114 crew, becoming the first of Britain's East India Company fleet to be lost.
- June 17 – The Indonesian city of Bandar Lampung is founded on the island of Sumatra.
- June 25 (June 15 O.S.) – Ivan V and Peter I are crowned as joint Tsars of Russia at the Cathedral of the Dormition in Moscow, with actual power exercised by their older sister, Sophia Alekseyevna for the next seven years.

==== July–September ====
- July 19 – Iyasus succeeds his father Yohannes I as Emperor of Ethiopia.
- August 6 – The Ottoman Empire declares war on the Holy Roman Empire and makes plans to attack Vienna.
- August 12 – Vesuvius begins a period of volcanic activity lasting for 10 days.
- August 23 – A comet that will later become known as Comet Halley, is observed from several locations on Earth after reaching magnitude 2 and becoming visible to the naked eye. Arthur Storer sees it from the North American colony of Maryland, while German astronomer Johannes Hevelius measures it from Danzig (now Gdansk in Poland). Edmond Halley successfully predicts that it will return in 1758.
- August 25 – Following the Bideford witch trial, three women (probably) become the penultimate known to be hanged for witchcraft in England, at Exeter.
- September 14 – Bishop Gore School is founded in Swansea, Wales.
- September 24 – Trịnh Căn becomes the new ruler of Tonkin (located in the northern part of Vietnam as far south as the Hà Tĩnh province upon the death of his father, Trịnh Tạc, and begins a program of reforms.

==== October–December ====
- October 12 – Sultan Mehmed IV departs Istanbul for Adrianople.
- October 19 – Kara Mustafa departs with the Ottoman army to Adrianople.
- October 27 – The city of Philadelphia, Pennsylvania is founded by William Penn.
- November 22 – Nearly 1,000 houses in Wapping, London are destroyed in a fire.
- December 11 – William Penn meets with Charles Calvert, 3rd Baron Baltimore for the first discussion of the boundary between the colonies of Pennsylvania and Maryland, fixed at 40 degrees north. Recognizing that 40° north would remove Pennsylvania's access to the sea, Penn proposes a purchase of some of Maryland's territory.
- December 27 – Colonists from the German electorate of Brandenburg arrive at Akwidaa on the Brandenburger Gold Coast at what is now Ghana and, five days later, begin building a fort at what is now Princes Town.

==== Date unknown ====
- Celia Fiennes, noblewoman and traveller, begins her journeys across Britain, in a venture that will prove to be her life's work. Her aim is to chronicle the towns, cities and great houses of the country. Her travels continue until at least 1712, and will take her to every county in England, though the main body of her journal is not written until the year 1702.
- The Richard Wall House, believed to be the longest continuously inhabited residence in the US, is built in Pennsylvania.

=== 1683 ===
==== January–March ====
- January 5 – The Brandenburger-African Company, of the German state of Brandenburg, signs a treaty with representatives of the Ahanta tribe (in modern-day Ghana), to establish the fort and settlement of Groß Friedrichsburg, in honor of Frederick William, Elector of Brandenburg. The location is later renamed Princes Town, also called Pokesu.
- January 6 – The tragic opera Phaëton, written by Jean-Baptiste Lully and Philippe Quinault, is premiered at the Palace of Versailles.
- January 27 – Gove's Rebellion breaks out in the Province of New Hampshire in North America as a revolt against the Royal Governor, Edward Cranfield. Most of the participants, and their leader Edward Gove, are arrested. Gove is convicted of treason but pardoned three years later.
- February 7 – The opera Giustino by Giovanni Legrenzi and about the life of the Byzantine Emperor Justin, premieres in Venice.
- March 14 – Ageng Tirtayasa, Sultan of Banten on the island of Java (part of modern-day Indonesia), is captured by soldiers hired by the Dutch East India Company.
- March 17 – In a battle at Kalyan (near Bombay) between the Maratha Empire and the Mughal Empire in India, Maratha General Hambirrao Mohite defeats the local Mughal official, Ranamast Khan.
- March 22 – Great fire in Newmarket, Suffolk, England, consuming half the houses and forcing King Charles II (who is in residence) to flee the town.
- March 31 – Authorized representatives of King John III Sobieski of Poland and Emperor Leopold I of the Holy Roman Empire sign a military alliance treaty in Warsaw.

==== April–June ====
- April 10 – Charles V, Duke of Lorraine is appointed commander of the Imperial Army of the Holy Roman Empire.
- May 3 – Sultan Mehmed IV of the Ottoman Empire enters Belgrade.
- May 24 – The Ashmolean Museum opens in Oxford (England), as the world's second university museum, after the establishment of the Kunstmuseum Basel in 1661 by the University of Basel.
- June 12 – The Rye House Plot to assassinate Charles II of England is discovered.

==== July–September ====
- July 8 – Admiral Shi Lang of Qing dynasty China leads 300 ships with 20,000 troops out of Tongshan, Fujian, and sails towards the Kingdom of Tungning, in modern-day Taiwan and Penghu, in order to quell the kingdom in the name of the Qing.
- July 14 – A 173,000-man Ottoman force arrives at Vienna, and starts to besiege the city.
- July 16–17 – Battle of Penghu: Qing Chinese admiral Shi Lang defeats the naval forces of Zheng Keshuang decisively.
- July 21 – The gruesome execution of Lord Russell, for his role in the 1683 Rye House Plot to assassinate King Charles II of England, is carried out by the royal executioner Jack Ketch, who wields his axe in a manner requiring multiple blows to make Russell suffer as much as possible during the beheading.
- August 4 – Turhan, in the powerful role of the Valide sultan of the Ottoman Empire since 1648 as the mother of Sultan Mehmed IV, dies at the age of 56, bringing an end to the era in Ottoman history known as the "Sultanate of Women". Upon the overthrow of Mehmed IV four years later, the role of the mother of the Ottoman Sultan is less powerful.
- August 18 – Francesco Maria Imperiale Lercari becomes the new Doge of the Republic of Genoa.
- August 20 – Bahadur, son of the Emperor Aurangzeb of the Mughal Empire in India, is dispatched along with other Mughal nobles on an invasion of Konkan, the area on the southwestern Indian coast under the control of the Maratha Empire.
- August 25 – The Earl of Limerick, Irishman Thomas Dongan, takes office as the new British Colonial Governor of the Province of New York and makes major reforms to restore public order and rescue the province from bankruptcy.
- September 5 – Qing Chinese admiral Shi Lang receives the formal surrender of Zheng Keshuang, ushering in the collapse of the Kingdom of Tungning, which is then incorporated into the Qing Empire.
- September 12
  - Battle of Vienna: The Ottoman siege of the city is broken with the arrival of a force of 70,000 Poles, Austrians and Germans under Polish–Lithuanian king Jan III Sobieski, whose cavalry turns their flank. The victory marks a turning point in the Ottoman Empire's fortunes and the end of the Turkish attempt to expand its control into Western Europe.
  - Pedro II becomes the King of Portugal after having served as regent since 1668 for his older brother Afonso VI.

==== October–December ====
- October 3 – Shi Lang reaches Taiwan and occupies modern-day Kaohsiung.
- October 6 – Germantown, Philadelphia is founded as the first permanent German settlement in North America (in 1983 U.S. President Ronald Reagan declares a 300th Year Celebration, and in 1987, it becomes an annual holiday, German-American Day).
- October 9 (possible date) – Louis XIV of France makes a morganatic marriage with Madame de Maintenon in a secret ceremony following the death on July 30 of his queen consort, Maria Theresa of Spain.
- November 1 – The English crown colony of the Province of New York is subdivided into 12 counties: Albany, Dutchess, Orange, Ulster, and Westchester (upstate); Kings, New York County, Queens, Richmond (within New York City); Suffolk (eastern Long Island), and two areas not in New York state, Dukes County (now in Massachusetts) and Cornwall County (now 11 counties in Maine).
- December 7 – Algernon Sidney, opponent of King Charles II of England and author of the rebel tract Discourses Concerning Government is beheaded after having been arrested on June 25 and found guilty on November 7.
- December 25
  - Kara Mustafa Pasha, Grand Vizier of the Ottoman Empire since 1676, is executed on orders of Sultan Mehmed IV after being blamed for the Ottoman loss of the Battle of Vienna on September 12. The execution is carried out in Belgrade as Kara Mustafa is strangled with a silk cord. The Sultan appoints Bayburtlu Kara Ibrahim Pasha as the new Grand Vizier.
  - George Ducas, the Prince of Moldavia installed by the Ottomans in 1678, is arrested by Polish authorities while on his way back to Bucharest from the defeat by Poland in the Battle of Vienna. Ducas is replaced by Ștefan Petriceicu.
- December 27 – Richard Keigwin leads a rebellion against the East India Company to take over as Governor of Bombay and most of the British territory in India, driving out Governor Sir John Child and arresting the Deputy Governor, Charles Ward. Keigwin surrenders the office less than a year later.
- December – The River Thames in England freezes, allowing a frost fair to be held.

==== Date unknown ====
- Wild boars are hunted to extinction in Britain.

=== 1684 ===
==== January–March ====
- January 5
  - King Charles II of England gives the title Duke of St Albans to Charles Beauclerk, his illegitimate son by Nell Gwyn.
  - The earliest form of what is now the University of Tokyo (formally chartered in 1877), the Tenmongata, is established in Japan.
- January 15 (January 5 O.S.) – To demonstrate that the River Thames, frozen solid during the Great Frost that started in December, is safe to walk upon, "a Coach and six horses drove over the Thames for a wager" and within three days "whole streets of Booths are built on the Thames and thousands of people are continually walking thereon." Sir Richard Newdigate, 2nd Baronet, records the events in his diary.
- January 26 – Marcantonio Giustinian is elected Doge of Venice.
- January – Edmond Halley, Christopher Wren and Robert Hooke have a conversation in which Hooke later claimed not only to have derived the inverse-square law, but also all the laws of planetary motion attributed to Sir Isaac Newton. Hooke's claim is that in a letter to Newton on 6 January 1680, he first stated the inverse-square law.
- February 7 – Morocco retakes control of the city of Tangier from England, which had controlled the North African port since 1661. During the five months prior to evacuation of the English from the city, the Governor, Lord Dartmouth had ordered the destruction of the wall around the city, its fortifications and port facilities that had been built by the English during the occupation.
- February 8 – Prince Dumitrașcu Cantacuzino returns to the throne of the principality of Moldavia for a third reign but is overthrown 14 months later on June 25. In 1859, Moldavia will unite with neighboring Wallachia to form the Kingdom of Romania.
- February 15 (February 5 O.S.) – The Great Frost in Britain, during which the River Thames was frozen in London and the sea as far as 2 miles (3.2 km) out from land and which started the previous December, ends as the Thames begins to thaw. William Maitland later writes that the Frost, which started in December 1683, "congealed the river Thames to that degree that another city, as it were, was erected thereon; where by the great number of streets and shops, with their rich furniture, it represented a great fair, with a variety of carriages, and diversions of all sorts." During the freeze, there had been great loss of beast and of wildlife, especially birds, and similar reports from across Northern Europe. The Chipperfield's Circus dynasty began during the freeze, with James Chipperfield introducing performing animals to the country at the Frost Fair on the Thames in London.
- February 24 – A treaty is signed between European German colonists in Brandenburg-Prussia, and the African chiefs in what is now Ghana to permit the German colonists to build a second fort on the Brandenburger Gold Coast, and the fortress of Dorotheenschanze is built. The area is now the Ghanaian city of Akwida.
- March 5 – Pope Innocent XI forms a Holy League with the Habsburg Empire, Venice and Poland, to end Ottoman Turkish rule in Europe.
- March 19 – In Japan, the Tenna era ends on the 21st day of the 2nd month of the Chinese calendar of the 4th year of the Tenna era and the Jōkyō era begins as Japan's royal astronomer, Shibukawa Shunkai institutes the Jōkyō calendar to replace Chinese calendar which had been used in Japan since 859 AD, after calculating that the length of the solar year is 365.2417 days.

==== April–June ====
- April 25 – The Morean War begins as the Republic of Venice declares war on the Ottoman Empire for control of the Peloponnese area of Greece, a peninsula which includes Corinth and Sparta and has been referred to by the Ottomans as Morea.
- May 18 – The French Navy begins a 10-day bombardment of the Italian city of Genoa in the course of the War of the Reunions between France and the Republic of Genoa. During the fight, the French fleet, commanded by Abraham Duquesne, fires almost 13,000 cannonballs, pausing only during a cease-fire on May 21 and May 22, and uses the new technology of explosive bombs. When the bombardment ends on May 28, two-thirds of the city has been destroyed or damaged.
- June 7 – After a siege of six weeks that began on April 27, Luxembourg City is taken by the French Army from control by Spain, and the Grand Duchy of Luxembourg, previously part of the Spanish Netherlands (now Belgium) is acquired by France.
- June 27 – Francisco de Távora, the Viceroy of Portuguese India, a small colony located in southwestern India at Goa, issues an order prohibiting indigenous residents from speaking their native language, Konkani, and directs them to learn Portuguese within the next three years.

==== July–September ====
- July 21–August 6 – Morean War: Siege of Santa Maura – The Republic of Venice captures the Ottoman island fortress of Santa Maura.
- July 24 – René-Robert Cavelier, Sieur de La Salle sails again from France, with a large expedition designed to establish a French colony on the Gulf of Mexico, at the mouth of the Mississippi River.
- August – Edmond Halley goes to Cambridge to discuss the problem of planetary motion with Isaac Newton.
- August 15
  - France under Louis XIV makes the Truce of Ratisbon separately with the Holy Roman Empire (Habsburg) and Spain.
  - Louis XIV decrees the foundation of the Maison royale de Saint-Louis, a boarding school for girls at Saint-Cyr, at the urging of Madame de Maintenon.
- September 21 – Morean War: The Republic of Venice captures the fortress town of Preveza from the Ottoman Empire.

==== October–December ====
- October 7 – Japanese Chief Minister Hotta Masatoshi is assassinated, leaving Shōgun Tokugawa Tsunayoshi without any adequate advisors, leading him to issue impractical edicts and create hardships for the Japanese people.
- November 8 – James Renwick, a Scottish minister and one of the "Covenanters" challenging the attempt by Kings James VI and Charles I to take over churches in Scotland, posts his "Apologetical Declaration" on church doors and market crosses in and around Cambusnethan, Lanarkshire.
- November 19 – Richard Keigwin, who had arrested the East India Company's Governor of Bombay in 1683, Josiah Child and had taken over as the unauthorized administrator of Bombay, turns control back to the company and its envoy, Sir Thomas Grantham, receiving a general pardon.
- December 10 – Isaac Newton's derivation of Kepler's laws from his theory of gravity, contained in the paper De motu corporum in gyrum, is read to the Royal Society by Edmond Halley.
- December 17 – The Tibet–Ladakh–Mughal War, which had been going on since 1679, ends with the signing of the Treaty at Tingmosgang between the 5th Dalai Lama (Desi Sangye Gyatso) and King Delek Namgyal of Ladakh. The Ladakh kingdom agrees to not invite foreign armies into the area (now part of the Indian union territory of Jammu and Kashmir) in return for a respect for its sovereignty.

==== Date unknown ====
- Japanese poet Ihara Saikaku composes 23,500 verses in 24 hours at the Sumiyoshi-taisha (shrine) at Osaka; the scribes cannot keep pace with his dictation and just count the verses.
- The British East India Company receives Chinese permission to build a trading station at Canton. Tea sells in Europe for less than a shilling a pound, but the import duty of 5 shillings makes it too expensive for most English people to afford; hence smuggled tea is drunk much more than legally imported tea.
- John Bunyan publishes the second part of The Pilgrim's Progress.

=== 1685 ===
==== January–March ====
- January 6 – American-born British citizen Elihu Yale, for whom Yale University in the U.S. is named, completes his term as the first leader of the Madras Presidency in India, administering the colony on behalf of the East India Company, and is succeeded by William Gyfford.
- January 8 – Almost 200 people are arrested in Coventry by English authorities for gathering to hear readings of the sermons of the non-conformist Protestant minister Obadiah Grew
- February 4 – A treaty is signed between Brandenburg-Prussia and the indigenous chiefs at Takoradi in what is now Ghana to permit the German colonists to build a third fort on the Brandenburger Gold Coast.
- February 6 – Catholic James Stuart, Duke of York, becomes King James II of England and Ireland, and King James VII of Scotland, in succession to his brother Charles II (1660–1685), King of England, Scotland, and Ireland since 1660. James II and VII reigns until deposed, in 1688.
- February 20 – René-Robert Cavelier, Sieur de La Salle, intending to establish a colony near the mouth of the Mississippi River, lands with 200 surviving colonists at Matagorda Bay on the Texas coast, believing the Mississippi to be near. He establishes Fort St. Louis.
- February–March – Morean War (part of the Great Turkish War): The Ottoman serasker Halil Pasha invades the Mani Peninsula, and forces it to surrender hostages.
- March 28 – An attack on a Mughal Empire envoy, Khwajah Abdur Rahim, outside of the Maratha fortress at the Bijapur Fort in India leads to a siege of the city by the forces of Mughal Emperor Aurangzeb. The siege lasts for 15 months before Bijapur surrenders.
- March – Louis XIV of France passes the Code Noir, allowing the full use of slaves in the French colonies.

==== April–June ====
- April 16 – Wara Dhammaraza becomes the new King of Arakan on the western coast of Burma upon the death of his brother, Thiri Thuriya.
- April 23 – The coronation of King James II of England (and his Queen Consort, Mary of Modena) takes place at Westminster Abbey.
- May 7 – Morean War – Battle on Vrtijeljka: Advancing Ottoman forces prevail over defending Venetian irregulars, on a hill in the Sanjak of Montenegro.
- May 11 – The Killing Time: Five Covenanters in Wigtown, Scotland, notably Margaret Wilson, are executed for refusing to swear an oath declaring King James of England, Scotland and Ireland as head of the church, becoming the Wigtown martyrs.
- June 11 – Monmouth Rebellion: James Scott, 1st Duke of Monmouth, illegitimate son of King Charles II of England, Scotland and Ireland, lands at Lyme Regis with an invasion force brought from the Netherlands, to challenge his uncle, James II, for the Crown of England.
- June 16 – A lunar eclipse is observed in the evening by François-Timoléon de Choisy, amongst others, onboard his ship in the vicinity of Madagascar. The ship was at a latitude of 37 degrees 40 minutes, and the eclipse was not visible from Europe.
- June 20 – Monmouth Rebellion: James, Duke of Monmouth declares himself at Taunton to be King, and heir to his father's Kingdoms as James II of England and Ireland, and James VII of Scotland.

==== July–September ====
- July 6 – Monmouth Rebellion: In the Battle of Sedgemoor, the last pitched battle fought on English soil, the armies of King James II of England defeat rebel forces under James Scott, 1st Duke of Monmouth, and capture the Duke himself shortly after the battle.
- July 15 – James Scott, 1st Duke of Monmouth, is executed at Tower Hill, London, England.
- August 11 – Morean War: The 49-day Siege of Coron ends with the surrender and massacre of its garrison by the Venetians.
- August 25 – The Bloody Assizes begin in Winchester: Lord Chief Justice of England George Jeffreys tries over 1000 of Monmouth's rebels and condemns them to death or transportation.
- September 14 – Morean War: The Republic of Venice defeats an Ottoman army at Kalamata.
- September 29 – The first organised street lighting is introduced by the city of London in England, as Edward Hemming begins carrying out his contract to be paid for lighting an oil lamp "at every tenth house on main streets between 6 PM and midnight between September 29 and March 25" on nights in the autumn and winter without adequate moonlight.

==== October–December ====
- October 22 – Louis XIV of France issues the Edict of Fontainebleau, which revokes the Edict of Nantes and declares Protestantism illegal, thereby depriving Huguenots of civil rights. Their Temple de Charenton-le-Pont is immediately demolished and many flee to England, Prussia and elsewhere.
- November 8 (October 29 O.S.) – The Edict of Potsdam is issued by Frederick William, Elector of Brandenburg in response to France's Edict of Fontainebleau, welcoming the Protestant Huguenots of France to resettle in eastern Germany in Brandenburg. The French Colony of Magdeburg is established on December 1 in Saxony as a community separate from Magdeburg.
- November 11 – Morean War: The Republic of Venice captures the fortress town of Igoumenitsa from the Ottoman Empire, and razes it to the ground.
- December 3 – King Charles XI of Sweden issues an order banning Jews from settling in Sweden, particularly in the capital at Stockholm "on account of the danger of the eventual influence of the Jewish religion on the pure evangelical faith."
- December 10 – In what is now Thailand, King Narai of Ayutthaya signs a treaty with representatives of France at Lopburi, allowing Roman Catholic missionaries to preach the Gospel and exempting Thai Catholics from work on Sunday, as well as appointing a special court to settle disputes between Thai Christians and non-Christians.

==== Date unknown ====
- The Chinese army of the Qing dynasty attacks a Russian post at Albazin, during the reigns of the Kangxi Emperor and the dual Russian rulers Ivan V of Russia and Peter I of Russia. The event leads to the Treaty of Nerchinsk in 1689.
- Adam Baldridge founds a pirate base at Île Sainte-Marie, Madagascar.
- Alice Molland becomes the last known person in England to be sentenced to death for witchcraft, in Exeter.
- The Old Dutch Church of Sleepy Hollow in the State of New York is constructed by the original Dutch settlers (later to become famous as the site of the rampage of the "Headless Horseman" spirit in the novel The Legend of Sleepy Hollow).

=== 1686 ===
==== January–March ====
- January 3 – In Madras (now Chennai) in India, local residents employed by the East India Company threaten to boycott their jobs after corporate administrator William Gyfford imposes a house tax on residences within the city walls. Gyfford places security forces at all entrances to the city and threatens to banish anyone who fails to pay their taxes, as well as to confiscate the goods of merchants who refuse to make sales. A compromise is reached the next day on the amount of the taxes.
- January 17 – King Louis XIV of France reports the success of the Edict of Fontainebleau, issued on October 22 against the Protestant Huguenots, and reports that after less than three months, the vast majority of the Huguenot population had left the country.
- January 29 – In Guatemala, Spanish Army Captain Melchor Rodríguez Mazariegos leads a campaign to conquer the indigenous Maya people in the rain forests of Lacandona, departing from Huehuetenango to rendezvous with the colonial governor at San Mateo Ixtatán.
- January 31 – In the wake of the success of France's campaign against Protestantism, Victor Amadeus II, the Duke of Savoy, issues an edict against the Valdesi, the Duchy's Protestant minority, setting a 15-day deadline for members of the Valdesi to publicly renounce their beliefs as erroneous, or face banishment or death. The February 15 deadline is ignored.
- February 15 – After the Valdesi in the Duchy of Savoy decline to obey the edict to convert to Catholicism, Duke Victor Amadeus dispatches a force of 9,000 French and Piedmontese soldiers to enforce the edict.
- February 22 – Sweden's Council of State endorses the reforms proposed by King Charles XI for the Swedish Church Law 1686, after having debated it in three sessions on February 18, 19 and 20. The law confirms and describes the rights of the Lutheran Church and confirms Sweden as a Lutheran state; all non-Lutherans are banned from immigration unless they convert to Lutheranism; the Romani people are to be incorporated to the Lutheran Church; the poor care law is regulated; and all parishes are forced by law to teach the children within them to read and write, in order to learn the scripture, which closely eradicates illiteracy in Sweden.
- February 27 – Gabriel Milan, the controversial Governor of the Danish West Indies since 1684, is removed from office by order of King Frederick III and placed under arrest for treason. Three years later, after being found guilty in a trial after being brought back to Copenhagen, Milan is beheaded on March 26, 1689.
- March 3 – A group of 107 French Canadian soldiers, under the command of Pierre de Troyes, begins the Hudson Bay expedition, departing from Montreal on an 800-mile (1,300 km) journey to take control of the properties of British North American settlers of the Hudson's Bay Company. The group marches for 82 days and arrives at the first Hudson's Bay fort, at Moose Factory on June 19.

==== April–June ====
- April 9 – As the Valdesi rebellion continues, the Duke of Savoy issues a second edict, giving the Protestant Valdesi eight days to lay down their arms and allows safe passage into exile for those who agree.
- April 22 – In the wake of Savoy's newest repression of the Protestant Valdesi, a third war breaks out and Protestant pastor Henri Arnaud leads the resistance with 3,000 rebel soldiers against 8,500 Savoyard soldiers and mercenaries. The Valdesi are overwhelmed within one month.
- May 4 – The Municipality of Ilagan is founded in the Philippines.
- May 6 – The Treaty of Perpetual Peace (1686) is signed between the Tsardom of Russia and the Polish–Lithuanian Commonwealth, recognizing the former's possession of Left-bank Ukraine and the city of Kiev, as agreed upon in the earlier Treaty of Andrusovo in 1667. The treaty also brings the Tsardom of Russia into the Great Turkish War, on the side of the Holy League of 1684.
- May 14 – Joseph Dudley formally begins his tenure, as President of the Council of the newly formed Dominion of New England.
- May 25 – The third war against the Protestant Valdesi ends. Soon afterward, 2,000 of the Valdesi are massacred, 8,500 taken prisoner and about 3,000 surviving civilians forcibly resettled and converted to Catholicism.
- June 20 – French Canadian soldiers on the Hudson Bay expedition capture the first of the British Hudson's Bay Company outposts, with the surrender the unarmed inhabitants of the fortress at Moose Factory, Ontario.

==== July–September ====
- July 9 – The Grand Alliance (League of Augsburg) is founded, in response to claims made by Louis XIV of France on the Electorate of the Palatinate in western Germany. It comprises the Holy Roman Empire, the Netherlands, Sweden, Spain, the electors of Bavaria, Saxony and the Electorate of the Palatinate.
- July 17 – King James II of England appoints four Roman Catholics to the Privy Council of England, in defiance of the Test Acts, which bar Catholics from public office. Suspicions about James's intentions lead to a group of conspirators meeting at Charborough House in Dorset, to plan his overthrow and replacement with the Protestant Dutch Stadtholder, William III of Orange-Nassau (James's son-in-law).
- July 18 – An army of 3,000 Chinese troops demand Russian surrender of a Russian Empire fortress at Albazino on the Amur River. The fortress is manned by only 736 Russian soldiers and militia but is armed with cannons. Over the next several weeks, the Chinese troops are joined by another 3,000 men in supply boats, but the Russians hold off the attacks for the next five months. By December, only 24 Russians remain, and Albazino is ceded to China in 1689.
- July 22 – Albany, New York, is granted a city charter by the colonial governor.
- August 4 – Portuguese soldiers hired by the East India Company mutiny rather than follow orders to join the war in Bengal. The ringleaders are quickly arrested and executed, and the mutiny ends.
- August 15 – Christina, who had ruled as the monarch of Sweden until her abdication in 1654 in favor of her cousin Charles, responds to the revocation in France of the Edict of Nantz and declares that Jews within Sweden will be under her protection.
- August 16 – King James VII of Scotland dismisses the Parliament of Scotland after the members refuse to remove restrictions on Roman Catholics and on Protestants outside of the Church of Scotland and the Church of England. The Parliament does not meet again for more than two and a half years.
- August 17 – Spanish troops attack and plunder the Scottish colony of Stuarts Town in the Province of Carolina (now Port Royal, South Carolina) and plunder the city. After three days, the Spaniards begin a march of over 75 miles (121 km) toward the larger port city of Charles Town.
- September 2 – Great Turkish War: Battle of Buda – Imperial forces of the Holy League of 1684 (Russia, Saxony, Brandenburg and Bavaria under Austrian leadership) liberate Buda (now part of Budapest) from Ottoman Turkish rule (leading to the end of Ottoman rule in Hungary during subsequent years).
- September 4 – A hurricane saves Charleston, South Carolina from attack by Spanish vessels.
- September 30 – The Ottoman fortress of Sinj in Dalmatia falls to the army of the Republic of Venice.

==== October–December ====
- October 17 – As the Savoyard–Waldensian wars, draw to a close, the Duke of Savoy announces that the Protestant Valdisi defenders will be granted safe passage to Switzerland, and that children taken during the war will be allowed to return to their families. By January, a little more than 2,500 Valdisi take the offer.
- October 22 – In the Great Turkish War, the Siege of Pécs ends when the Ottoman-held city, located across the Danube River from the recent liberated Buda, surrenders to Austrian troops of the Holy League, continuing the Austrian assumption of control of Hungary. Buda and Pécs are later combined to form the Hungarian city (and now capital) of Budapest.
- October 23 – Szeged, now the second largest city in Hungary, is liberated from Turkish Ottoman rule.
- October 31 – Anglurah Agung, the virtual leader of the island of Bali as king of the paramount state of Gelgel, is killed in battle fighting Batu Lepang (who also dies in the fighting), ending the unification of the island (now part of Indonesia) and causing Bali to split into several principalities.
- November 26 – The Treaty of Whitehall, more formerly the Treaty of Neutrality for America, is signed at the Palace of Whitehall in Westminster between representatives of King Louis XIV of France and King James II of England, with both sides pledging that "though the two Countries might be at war in Europe their Colonies in America should continue in peace and Neutrality". The treaty is broken less than two years later when King William's War breaks out in what is now the U.S. state of Maine.
- November 30 – Melchor Portocarrero, 3rd Count of Monclova becomes the new Viceroy of New Spain (encompassing what is now Mexico and much of the southwestern United States) as he arrives in Mexico City to take over at the end of the term of Tomás de la Cerda, 3rd Marquess of la Laguna.
- December 20 – Edmund Andros arrives in Boston to become the British Governor of the newly created Dominion of New England, which includes most of the what are now the U.S. states of Connecticut, Maine, Massachusetts, New Hampshire, New Jersey, Rhode Island, Vermont and much of the eastern portion of New York. The unpopular Andros, who reigns as a dictator after being appointed by King James II, is driven out of office in 1689 after the overthrow of James, and the Dominion of New England is broken up into its constituent colonies.
- December 22 – Frederick William, Elector of Brandenburg and Duke of Prussia, head of the House of Hohenzollern, enters into an alliance with the Holy Roman Empire.

==== Date unknown ====
- English historian and naturalist Robert Plot publishes The Natural History of Staffordshire, a collection of illustrations and texts detailing the history of the county. It is the first document known to mention crop circles and a double sunset.
- The Café Procope, which remains in business in the 21st century, is opened in Paris by Procopio Cutò, as a coffeehouse.

=== 1687 ===
==== January–March ====
- January 3 – With the end of latest of the Savoyard–Waldensian wars in the Duchy of Savoy between the Savoyard government and Protestant Italians known as the Waldensians, Victor Amadeus III, Duke of Savoy, carries out the release of 3,847 surviving prisoners and their families, who had forcibly been converted to Catholicism, and permits the group to emigrate to Switzerland.
- January 8 – Richard Talbot, 1st Earl of Tyrconnell, is appointed as the last Lord Deputy of Ireland by the English crown, and begins efforts to include more Roman Catholic Irishmen in the administration. Upon the removal of King James II in England and Scotland, the Earl of Tyrconnell loses his job and is replaced by James, who reigns briefly as King of Ireland until William III establishes his rule over the isle.
- January 27 – In one of the most sensational cases in England in the 17th century, midwife Mary Hobry murders her abusive husband, Denis Hobry, after he beats her up for the last time. Mary then dismembers his body and scatters the remains in a dunghill and in several outhouses (or privies) in the area. Despite a defense of justifiable homicide, Mary is convicted of murder and burned at the stake.
- February 7 – The Arjeplog blasphemy trial begins for Erik Eskilsson and Amund Thorsson, two practitioners of the Sami religion who had resisted Sweden's efforts at their conversion to Christianity. Eskilsson and Thorsson are acquitted of the charges after agreeing to convert to Christianity.
- February 11 – In India, troops under the command of Job Charnock of the East India Company, preparing to go to war against the Nawab of Bengal, Shaista Khan of the Mughal empire, destroy his fortresses located at Thana.
- February 12 – The Declaration of Indulgence is issued in Scotland by King James VII as one of the first steps in establishing freedom of religion in the British Isles, eliminating enforcement of criminal penalties against persons who failed to conform with Anglicanism. As King James II of England, he issues a similar declaration on April 4.
- March 19 – The men under explorer Robert Cavelier, Sieur de La Salle mutiny, while searching for the mouth of the Mississippi River. Pierre Duhaut murders La Salle, near what is now Navasota, Texas.

==== April–June ====
- April 4 – King James II of England issues the Declaration of Indulgence (or Declaration for the Liberty of Conscience), suspending laws against Roman Catholics and nonconformists.
- April 23 – Ignatius George II becomes Syriac Orthodox Patriarch of Antioch (or April 22).
- April 26 – The Spanish city of Guayaquil (now part of Ecuador) is attacked and looted by English and French pirates under the command of George Hout (English) and Pierre Le Picard and Francois Groniet (French). Of more than 260 pirates, 35 are killed and 46 were wounded; 75 defenders of the city died and more than 100 are wounded.
- May 6 – Emperor Higashiyama succeeds Emperor Reigen, on the throne of Japan.
- June 14 – In one of the few actions on land in the Anglo-Siamese War, English sailors on the coast of Mergui in Burma (now Myeik, Myanmar) are massacred by Siamese troops.

==== July–September ====
- July 11 – Isaac Newton's Philosophiæ Naturalis Principia Mathematica, known as the Principia, is published by the Royal Society of London. In it, Newton describes his law of universal gravitation, explains the laws of mechanics, and gives a formula for the speed of sound. The writing of Principia Mathematica ushers in a tidal wave of changes in thought, significantly accelerating the Scientific Revolution by providing new and practical intellectual tools, and becomes the foundation of modern physics.
- July 24 – Morean War: Battle of Patras – The Republic of Venice defeats the Ottomans, which flee in panic, allowing the Venetians to capture the fortresses of Patras, Rio, Antirrio, and Lepanto unopposed.
- August 12 – Great Turkish War: Battle of Mohács – The Habsburg imperial army, and allies under Charles V, Duke of Lorraine, defeat the Ottoman Turks, and enable Austria to conquer most of Ottoman-occupied Hungary.
- September 21 – Morean War: The navy of the Republic of Venice raids the Dalmatian coast, and attacks Ottoman Turkish strongholds in Greece.
- September 22 – The Siege of Golconda, ordered by Emperor Aurangzeb of India's Mughal Empire against the capital of the Golconda sultanate, ends after nine months when a traitor inside the walled city, Sarandaz Khan, opens the first of several entrances into the fortress. The Sultan Abul Hasan Qutb Shah is taken prisoner by General Mir Shahab ud-Din, and Golconda (now part of Hyderabad in the Telangana state).
- September 26 – Half of the Parthenon is destroyed in Athens after mortar shells are fired by Republic of Venice forces under the command of Francesco Morosini in a battle against the Ottoman Empire for control of the city. The strike ignites a stock of gunpowder that the Ottomans had stored inside the 2,200-year-old temple, which had been completed in 438 BC as a shrine to the goddess Athena. During the fighting September 23 and September 29 for control of the Acropolis in the Morean War, the Temple of Athena Nike is demolished and the Propylaea suffers damage.

==== October–December ====
- October 20 – An estimated 8.7 magnitude earthquake strikes 50 kilometres (31 mi) off of the coast of Peru and kills at least 5,000 people, primarily from a tsunami that washes away the city of Pisco and causes severe damage to the Spanish colonial cities of Lima, Callao and Ica.
- October 31 – The legend of the Charter Oak begins as a successful attempt to hide the 1662 Royal Charter of the British colony (and now a U.S. state) of Connecticut after Edmund Andros, the Governor of the Dominion of New England, makes a mission of attempting to confiscate the founding documents for the seven colonies that make up the new administrative area. After Governor Andros arrives in Hartford and comes to the tavern of Zachariah Sanford to demand the Connecticut Colony charter, Captain Joseph Wadsworth spirits the parchment away from the and hides the Charter in a hollowed out portion of a white oak tree on Wyllys Hyll until Andros is recalled to London.
- November 8 – Suleiman II succeeds the deposed Mehmed IV, as Ottoman Emperor.
- December 31 – In response to the revocation of the Edict of Nantes in 1685, a group of Huguenots set sail from France, and settle in the recently established Dutch colony at the Cape of Good Hope, where, using their native skills, they establish the first South African vineyards.

=== 1688 ===
==== January–March ====
- January 2 – Fleeing from the Spanish Navy, French pirate Raveneau de Lussan and his 70 men arrive on the west coast of Nicaragua, sink their boats, and make a difficult 10 day march to the city of Ocotal.
- January 5 – Pirates Charles Swan and William Dampier and the crew of the privateer Cygnet become the first Englishmen to set foot on the continent of Australia.
- January 11 – The Patta Fort and the Avandha Fort, located in what is now India's Maharashtra state near Ahmednagar, are captured from the Maratha clan by Mughul Army commander Matabar Khan. The Mughal Empire rules the area 73 years.
- January 17 – Ilona Zrínyi, who has defended the Palanok Castle in Hungary from Austrian Imperial forces since 1685, is forced to surrender to General Antonio Caraffa.
- January 29 – Madame Jeanne Guyon, French mystic, is arrested in France and imprisoned for seven months.
- January 30 (January 20, 1687 old style) – King James II of England and Scotland issues a proclamation offering amnesty to pirates in the West Indies who surrender to Sir Robert Holmes.
- February 7 – Six French Jesuit scientists, Joachim Bouvet, Jean-François Gerbillon, Louis-Daniel Lecomte, Guy Tachard, Claude de Visdelou and the leader, Jean de Fontaney, arrive in Beijing and are welcomed by the Emperor of China, Kangxi.
- February 17 – James Renwick, the last of the Covenanters in Scotland to be martyred for opposing the authority of King Charles II, is publicly hanged at Grassmarket square in Edinburgh.
- February 23 – Abaza Siyavuş Pasha, the Grand Vizier of the Ottoman Empire, is assassinated by the Janissaries, the Turkish troops who had placed him in power in September, after the new Sultan fails to make payment of an expected bonus.
- February 28 – The French opera David et Jonathas, composed by Marc-Antoine Charpentier, is performed for the first time.
- March 1 – A great fire devastates Bungay, England.
- March – William Dampier makes the first recorded visit to Christmas Island, now a territory of Australia, located south of the island of Java (now part of Indonesia).

==== April–June ====
- April 3 – Francesco Morosini becomes Doge of Venice.
- April 9 – Morean War: The Venetian forces under Francesco Morosini evacuate Athens and Piraeus.
- April 18 (Julian calendar) – The Germantown Quaker Protest Against Slavery is drafted by four Germantown Quakers.
- May 4 – King James II of England orders his Declaration of Indulgence, suspending penal laws against Catholics, to be read from every Anglican pulpit in England. The Church of England and its staunchest supporters, the peers and gentry, are outraged; on June 8 the Archbishop of Canterbury, William Sancroft, is imprisoned in the Tower of London for refusing to proclaim it.
- May 9 (April 29 OS) – Friedrich Wilhelm, the Great Elector of Brandenburg-Prussia, dies. Friedrich III becomes Elector of Brandenburg-Prussia until 1701, when he becomes the first King of Prussia, as Friedrich I.
- May 10 – King Narai of Ayutthaya nominates Princess Sudawadi as his successor, with Constantine Phaulkon, Mom Pi and Phetracha acting as joint regents.
- May 17 – The arrest of King Narai of Ayutthaya launches a coup d'état.
- June 5
  - A 7.0 magnitude earthquake strikes southern Italy at 6:30 in the evening and kills at least 10,000 people in the Kingdom of Naples in what is now the province of Benevento.
  - Constantine Phaulkon is beheaded after having been arrested in May.
- June 10 – The birth of James Francis Edward Stuart (later known as the Old Pretender), son and heir to James II of England and his Catholic wife Mary of Modena, at St James's Palace in London, increases public disquiet about a Catholic dynasty, particularly when the baby is baptised into the Catholic faith. Rumours about his true maternity swiftly begin to circulate.
- June 24 – French forces under Chevalier de Beauregard abandon their garrison at Mergui, following repeated Siamese attacks; this ultimately leads to their withdrawal from the country.
- June 30 – A high-powered conspiracy of notables (the Immortal Seven) invite Dutch stadtholder William III of Orange and Princess Mary to "defend the liberties of England", and depose King James VII and II.

==== July–September ====
- July 13 – The siege of Negroponte by the Venetians begins.
- August 1 – Phetracha becomes king of Ayutthaya, after a coup d'état.
- August 27 – The funding of the armed invasion of William III in England causes a financial crisis in the Dutch Republic.
- September 6 – Great Turkish War: The Habsburg army captures Belgrade.
- September 24 – Louis XIV publishes his manifesto Memoire de raisons, which lists his grievances and demands. He cites three major things as grievances: Wilhelm Egon von Fürstenberg, who had been earlier elected to be the coadjutor-archbishop of Cologne with support of Louis being vetoed by the pope, the continued aggressions and forming of alliances against France and providing an alternative to Fürstenberg in the Cologne election by the Holy Roman Empire, and Philip William becoming Elector Palatine and seizing the territory, which he believed belonged to Elizabeth Charlotte.
- September 27 – The Nine Years' War begins in Europe and America after Louis XIV attacks Philippsburg in the Holy Roman Empire.

==== October–December ====
- October 21 – The Venetians raise the siege of Negroponte.
- October 26 – King James II of England dismisses his minister Robert Spencer, 2nd Earl of Sunderland.
- November 11 (November 1 OS) – Glorious Revolution: William III of Orange sets sail a second time from Hellevoetsluis, the Netherlands, to take over England, Scotland and Ireland from King James II of England.
- November 15 (November 5 OS) – The Glorious Revolution begins: William of Orange lands at Torbay, England with a multinational force of 20,000 soldiers. He makes no claim to the British Crown, saying only that he has come to save Protestantism and to maintain English liberty, and begins a march on London.
- November 19 (November 9 OS) – William of Orange captures Exeter, after the magistrates flee the city.
- November 20 (November 10 OS) – The Wincanton Skirmish between forces loyal to James II led by Patrick Sarsfield and a party of Dutch troops is one of the few armed clashes in England during the Glorious Revolution.
- November 23 – A group of 1,500 Old Believers immolate themselves to avoid capture, when troops of the tsar lay siege to their monastery on Lake Onega.
- November 26 – Hearing that William of Orange has landed in England, Louis XIV declares war on the Netherlands.
- December 7 –
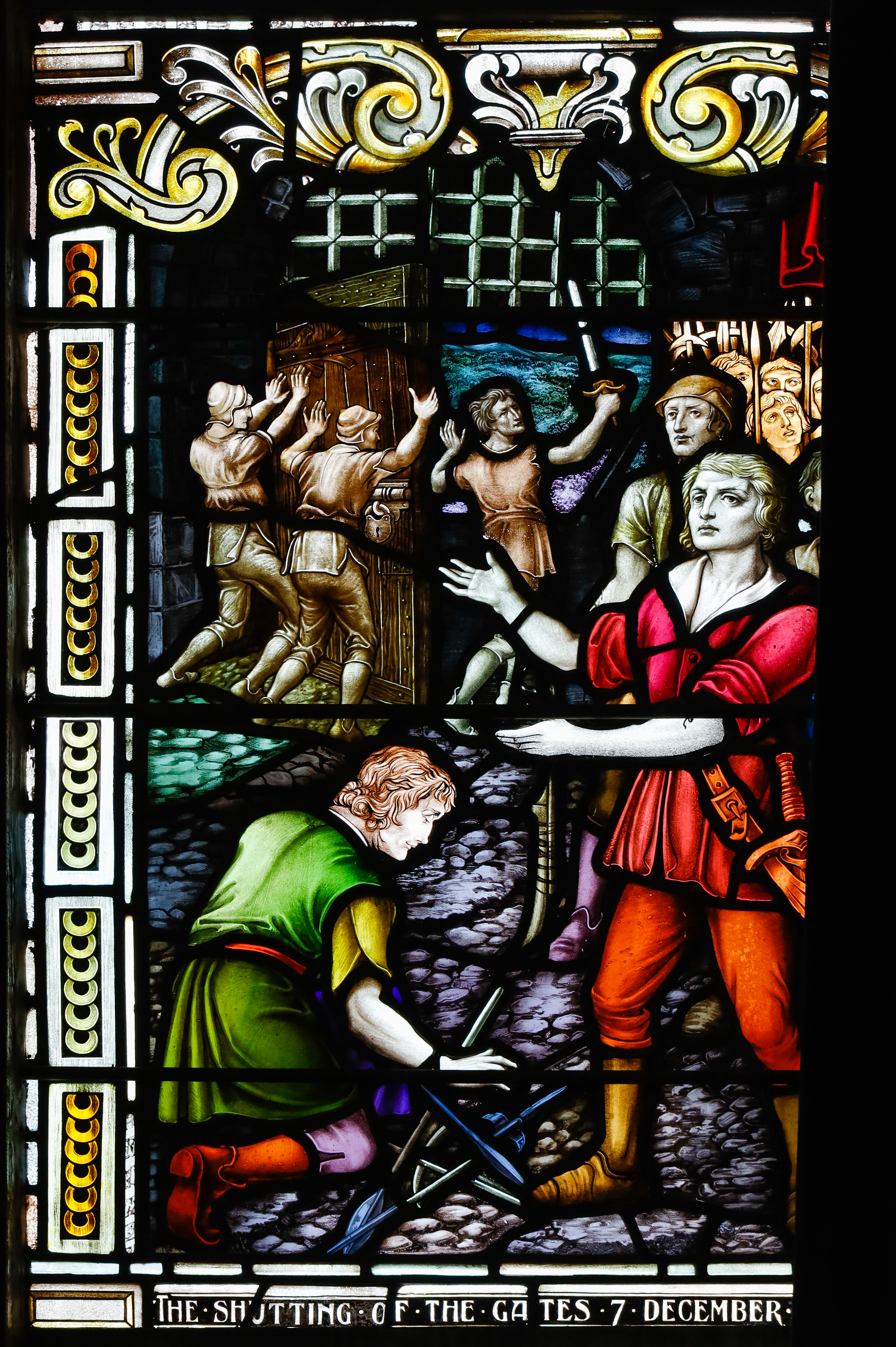
  December 7: The shutting of the gates in Derry in a stained glass window of the Guildhall
  The gates of Derry are shut in front of the Jacobite Earl of Antrim and his "redshanks". This initiates the siege of Derry, which is the first major event in the Williamite War in Ireland.
- December 9 – The Battle of Reading takes place in Reading, Berkshire. It is the only substantial military action in England during the Glorious Revolution and ends in a decisive victory for forces loyal to William of Orange.
- December 11 – Having led his army to Salisbury and been deserted by his troops, James VII and II attempts to flee to France.
- December 18 – William of Orange, Stadtholder of the Dutch Republic and the future King William III of the United Kingdom, enters London.

==== Date unknown ====
- The Austrians incite the Chiprovtsi Uprising against the Ottomans in Bulgaria after the siege of Belgrade.
- Neuruppin becomes a Prussian garrison town.
- The earliest known mention of the balalaika is made.
- Oroonoko, one of the first English novels and the first by a professional female author (Aphra Behn) is published.

=== 1689 ===
Notable events during this year include:

- Coup, war, and legislation in England and its territories.
  - The overthrow of Catholic king James of England, Ireland, and Scotland in the Glorious Revolution.
  - The latter realms entering the Nine Years War and its expansion to the American colonies in the King William's War.
  - The Bill of Rights becomes law in England.
- Japanese writer Bashō goes on a voyage, resulting in the classic Narrow Road to the Interior.
- The death of Pope Innocent XI and the election of the 241st Pope Alexander VIII.
- The Holy Roman Empire wins the Battle of Niš, fought against the Ottoman Empire.
- Morocco wins in the Siege of Larache against Spain.
- Peter the Great decrees the construction of the Great Siberian Road to China.

==== January–March ====
- January 22 (January 12, 1688 O.S.) – Glorious Revolution in England: The Convention Parliament is convened to determine if King James II of England, the last Roman Catholic British monarch, vacated the throne when he fled to France, at the end of 1688. The settlement of this is agreed on 8 February.
- January 30 – The first performance of the opera Henrico Leone composed by Agostino Steffani takes place in Hannover to inaugurate the new royal theatre in the Leineschloss.
- February 12 – John Locke returned to London from exile in Holland.
- February 23 (February 13, 1688 O.S.) – William III and Mary II are proclaimed co-rulers of England, Scotland and Ireland.
- March 2 – Nine Years' War: As French forces leave, they set fire to Heidelberg Castle, and the nearby town of Heidelberg.
- March 22 (March 12 O.S.) – Start of the Williamite War in Ireland: The deposed James II of England lands with 6,000 French soldiers in Ireland, where there is a Catholic majority, hoping to use it as the base for a counter-coup. However, many Irish Catholics see him as an agent of Louis XIV of France, and refuse to support him.
- March 27 – Japanese haiku master Bashō sets out on his last great voyage, which will result in the prose and verse classic Oku no Hosomichi ("Narrow Road to the Interior").

==== April–June ====
- April 4 – A total lunar eclipse is visible in central Asia.
- April 11 (O.S.) – William III and Mary II are crowned in London as King and Queen of England, Scotland and Ireland. Ireland does not recognise them yet, while the Estates of Scotland declare King James VII of Scotland deposed.
- April 18
  - Boston revolt: Unpopular New England Governor Sir Edmund Andros and other officials are overthrown by a "mob" of Bostonians. Andros, an appointee of James II of England, is disliked for his support of the Church of England and revocation of various colonial charters.
  - The Siege of Derry begins in Ireland as former King James II arrives at the gates of Derry and asks for its surrender during the Williamite War in Ireland. The Protestant defenders refuse and the siege lasts until August 1 when it is abandoned. .
- April 19 - A fire in Amalienborg-palace in Copenhagen killed 180 people.
- May 11 (May 1 O.S.)
  - The Battle of Bantry Bay begins during the Williamite War in Ireland as the French fleet under the Marquis de Châteaurenault is able to protect its transports, unloading supplies for James II, from the English Royal Navy under the Earl of Torrington, and withdraws unpursued.
  - William and Mary accept the Scottish throne a month after the Scottish Parliament votes to depose King James VII
- May 12 – Nine Years' War: With England and the Netherlands now both ruled by William III, they join the Grand Alliance (League of Augsburg), thus escalating the conflict, which continues until 1697. This is also the effective beginning of King William's War, the first of four North American Wars (until 1763) between English and French colonists, both sides allied to Native American tribes. The nature of the fighting is a series of raids on each other's settlements, across the Canadian and New England borders.
- May 24 – The Act of Toleration, drawn up by the Convention Parliament of England to protect Protestants but with Roman Catholics intentionally excluded, is passed; this effectively concludes the Glorious Revolution.
- May 25 – The last hearth tax is collected in England and Wales.
- May 31 – Leisler's Rebellion: Calvinist Jacob Leisler deposes lieutenant governor Francis Nicholson and assumes control of the Province of New York.
- June 5 – The Convention of Estates adjourns in Scotland after 11 weeks and its members form a new Scottish parliament.
- June 14 – The Duke of Gordon, a Scottish peer and Jacobite supporter, surrenders Edinburgh Castle to Protestant attackers after holding out for 20 days following the Glorious Revolution.

==== July–September ====
- July 25 – The Council of Wales and the Marches is abolished.
- July 27 – First Jacobite rising: Battle of Killiecrankie near Pitlochry in Perthshire – Scottish Covenanter supporters of William III and Mary II (under Hugh Mackay) are defeated by Jacobite supporters of James II, but the latter's leader, John Graham, Viscount Dundee, is killed. Hand grenades are used in action.
- July 28 – English sailors break through a floating boom across the River Foyle, to end the siege of Derry after 105 days.
- August 2 – Boston Revolt: Edmund Andros, former governor of the Dominion of New England, escapes from Boston to Connecticut, but is recaptured.
- August 5 – Beaver Wars: Lachine massacre – A force of 1,500 Iroquois largely destroys the village of Lachine, New France.
- August 12 – Innocent XI (Benedetto Odescalchi, b. 1611), Pope since 1676, dies. He played a major part in founding both the League of Augsburg, against Louis XIV, and the Holy League, against the Ottoman Empire.
- August 20 – A large Williamite force under Marshal Schomberg begins the siege of Carrickfergus in the north of Ireland, which surrenders on August 27.
- August 21 – First Jacobite rising: Battle of Dunkeld – Covenanters defeat the Jacobites in Scotland.
- August 23
  - Roman Catholic cardinals convene in Rome for a papal conclave to elect a successor to Pope Innocent XI. The conclave lasts until October 6.
  - Gravely ill, the Empress Xiaoyiren is proclaimed empress by her husband, China's Kangxi Emperor, after having been Imperial Noble Consort since 1682. She dies the next day.
- August 27 – China and Russia sign the Treaty of Nerchinsk.
- September 3–12 – Messengers from over 100 Baptist churches assembled in the City of London to discuss and endorse the 1677 document that would become known as the 1689 Baptist Confession of Faith.
- September 8 – The Siege of Mainz (in the modern-day Rheinland-Pfalz state of Germany), which had started on June 1, ends after almost three months, as French General Nicolas Chalon du Blé surrenders the walled city to the armies of Austria and the Dutch Republic.
- September 9 – King William brings England into a military alliance with the Holy Roman Empire in a fight against France in the Nine Years War.
- September 24 – The Holy Roman Empire wins the Battle of Niš, fought against the Ottoman Empire during the Great Turkish War in modern-day Serbia.
- September 28–29 – A total lunar eclipse is visible in eastern America, western Europe and west Africa.

==== October–December ====
- October 6 – The papal conclave in Rome unanimously elects Pietro Vito Ottoboni as the new Pope. Ottoboni takes the name Alexander VIII and succeeds Pope Innocent XI, to become the 241st pope, the first Venetian to hold the office in over 200 years.
- October 26 – Skopje fire of 1689 occurs, lasting for two days and burning much of the city.
- November 11 – The Siege of Larache in Morocco ends when the Spanish troops surrender to Mawlay Ismail and the Moroccan forces.
- November 22 – Peter the Great decrees the construction of the Great Siberian Road to China.
- December 10 – A great comet is visible from Pekin and sightings continue until December 24th, including many from Dutch ships near the equator.
- December 16 – The Bill of Rights (An Act Declaring the Rights and Liberties of the Subject and Settling the Succession of the Crown), drawn up by the Convention Parliament of England to establish constitutional monarchy in England, but with Roman Catholics barred from the throne, receives royal assent; it will remain substantially in force into the 21st century.
- December 22 – A serious earthquake strikes Innsbruck, Austria.

==== Date unknown ====
- Peter the Great plots to overthrow his half-sister Sophia as regent of Russia.
- Supporters of William of Orange seize Liverpool Castle in the north west of England.
- The English East India Company expands its influence, and a Committee of the House of Commons is formed to deal with the concerns of the Company.
- Valvasor's The Glory of the Duchy of Carniola is printed in Nuremberg.
- The first documented performance of the opera Dido and Aeneas by Henry Purcell takes place at Josias Priest's girls' school in Chelsea, London, with a libretto based on Virgil's Aeneid.
- Boston suffers a smallpox epidemic.

== Births ==
1680

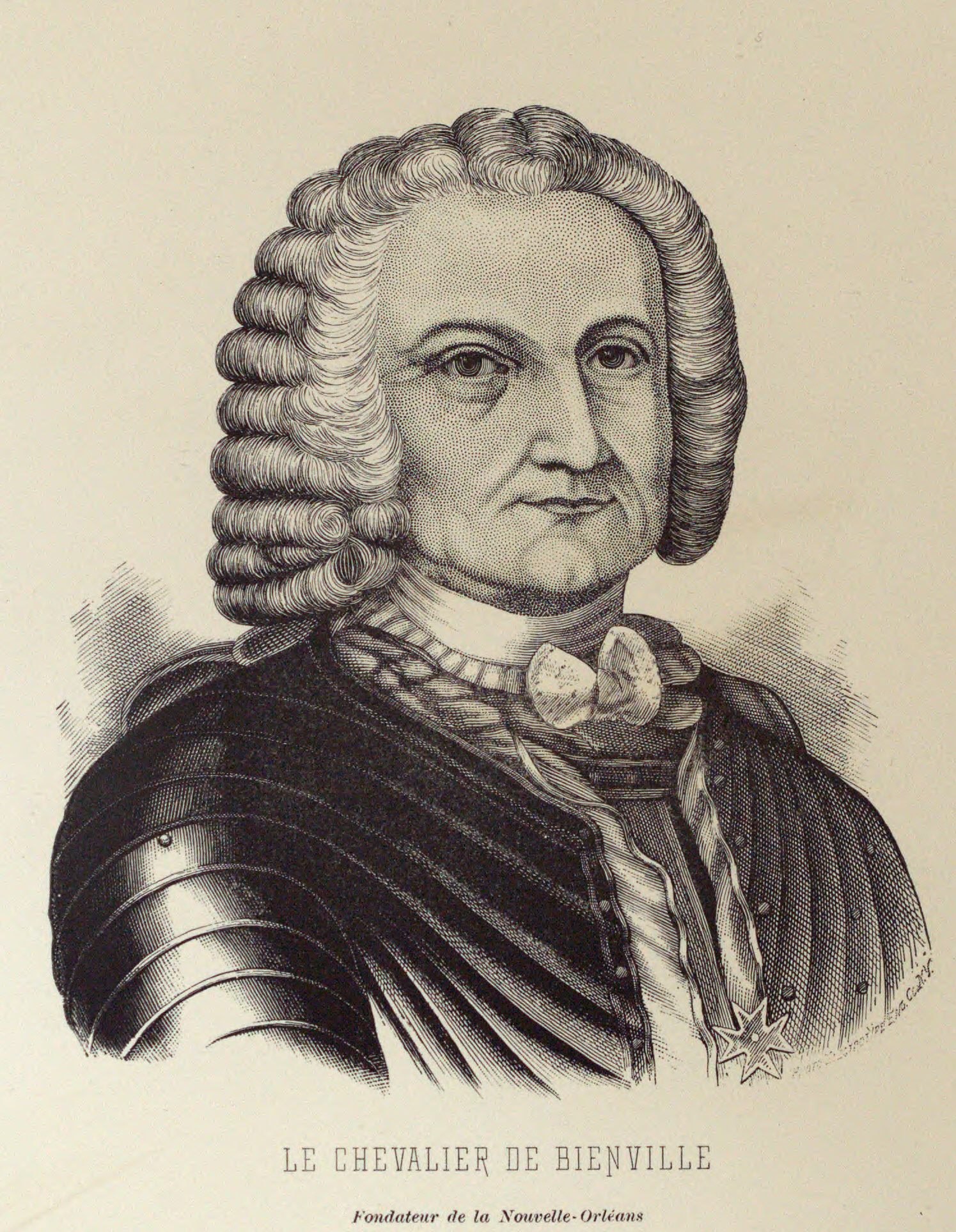
Jean-Baptiste Le Moyne

- January 23 – Joseph Ames, English author (d. 1759)
- February 14 – John Sidney, 6th Earl of Leicester, English privy councillor (d. 1737)
- February 23 – Jean-Baptiste Le Moyne de Bienville, French colonizer and Governor of Louisiana (d. 1767)
- April 9 – Philippe Néricault Destouches, French dramatist (d. 1754)
- April 23 – Anna Canalis di Cumiana, morganatic spouse of Victor Amadeus II of Savoy (d. 1769)
- June 22 – Ebenezer Erskine, Scottish religious dissenter (d. 1754)
- September 22 – Barthold Heinrich Brockes, German poet (d. 1747)
- October 19 – John Abernethy, Irish Protestant minister (d. 1740)
- date unknown – Bulleh Shah, Sufi poet (d. 1757)
- date unknown – Julianna Géczy, Hungarian heroine (d. 1714)
- approximate – Edward Teach (Blackbeard), English pirate (d. 1718)

1681

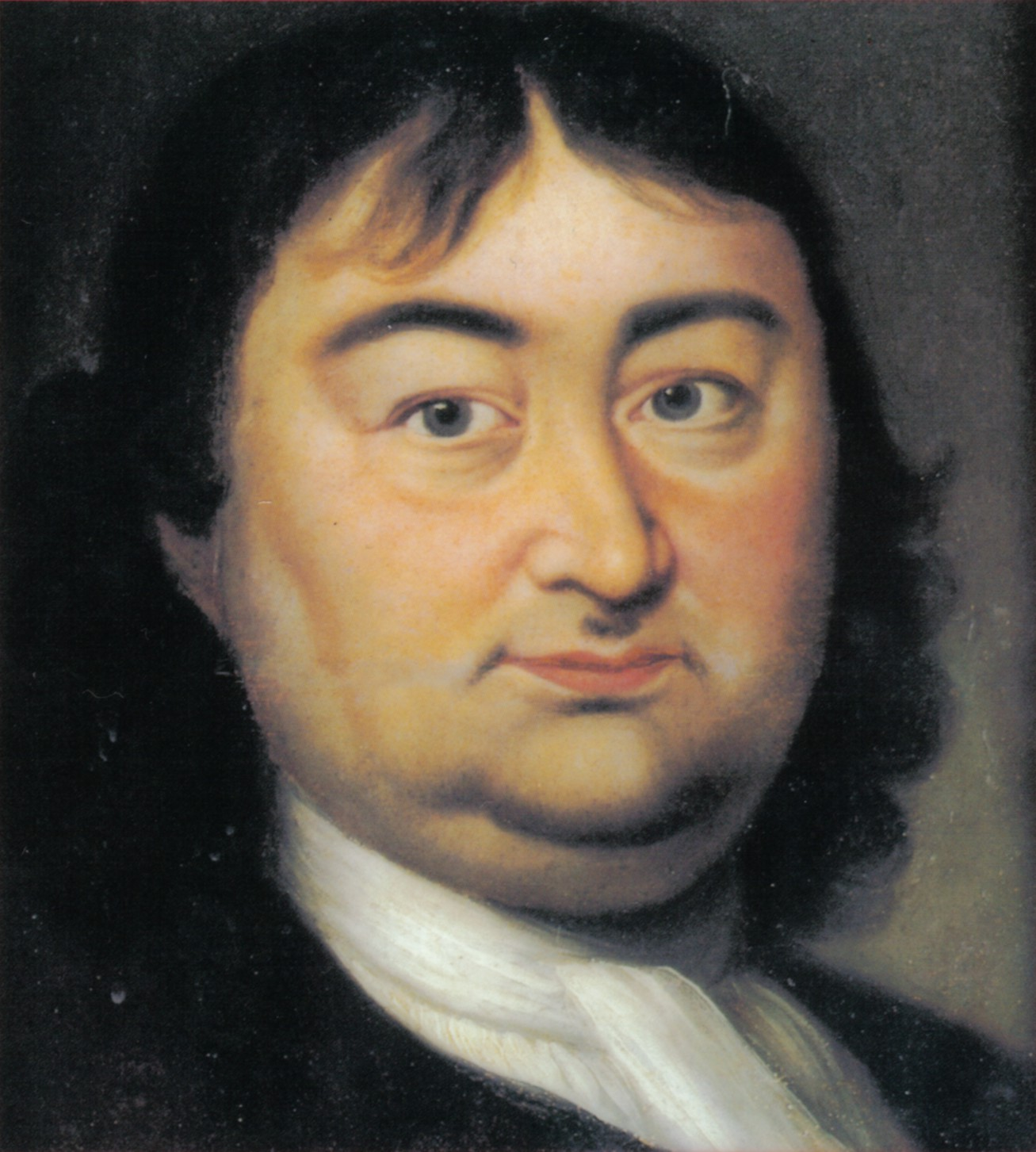
Vitus Bering

- March 24 – Georg Philipp Telemann, German composer (d. 1767)
- June 26 – Hedvig Sophia of Sweden, Swedish princess (d. 1708)
- August 5 – Vitus Bering, Danish-born Russian explorer (d. 1741)
- September 11 – Johann Gottlieb Heineccius, German jurist (d. 1741)
- September 28 – Johann Mattheson, German composer (d. 1764)
- October 1 – Giulia Lama, Italian painter (d. 1747)
- November 17 – Pierre François le Courayer, French theologian (d. 1776)
- November 28 – Jean Cavalier, French Protestant rebel leader (d. 1740)

1682

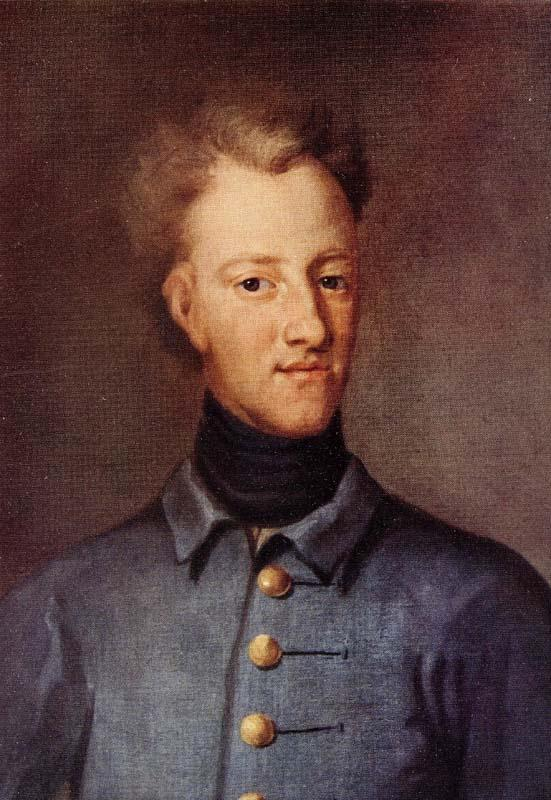
Charles XII of Sweden

- February 25 – Giovanni Battista Morgagni, Italian anatomist (d. 1771)
- April 16 – John Hadley, English inventor (d. 1744)
- May 17 – Bartholomew Roberts, a.k.a. Black Bart, Welsh pirate (d. 1722)
- June 17 – King Charles XII of Sweden (d. 1718)
- July 10 – Roger Cotes, English mathematician (d. 1716)
- August 16 – Louis, duc de Bourgogne, heir to the throne of France (d. 1712)
- October 29 – Pierre François Xavier de Charlevoix, French historian (d. 1761)
- date unknown – Margareta Capsia, Finnish artist (d. 1759)

1683

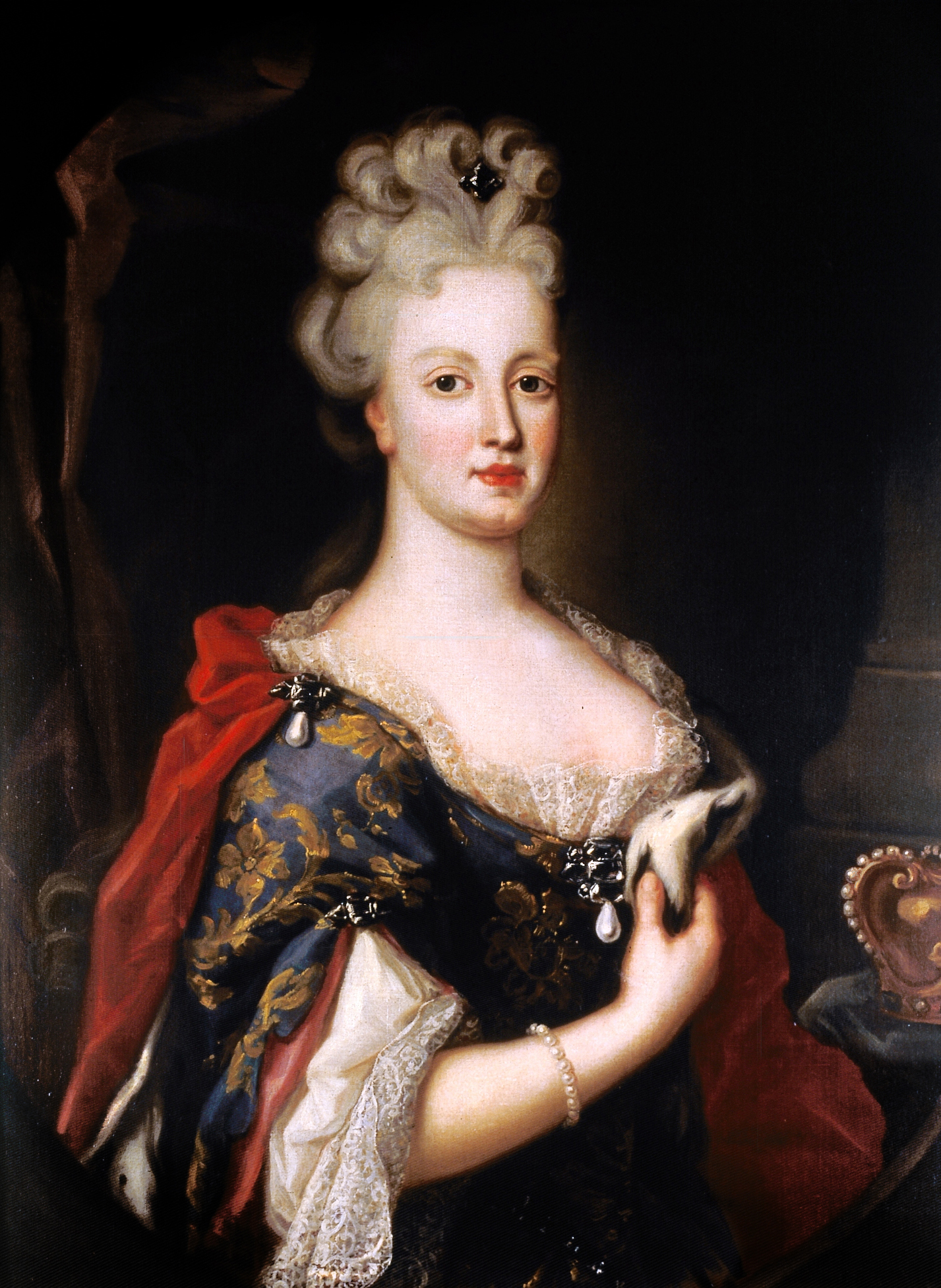
Maria Anna of Austria

- January 13 – Christoph Graupner, German composer (d. 1760)
- January 29 – Juan de Galavís, Spanish Catholic Archbishop of Santo Domingo, Bogotá (d. 1739)
- February 4 – Jean-Baptiste Bénard de la Harpe, French explorer of North America (d. 1765)
- February 28 – René Antoine Ferchault de Réaumur, French scientist (d. 1757)
- March 1 – Caroline of Ansbach, British queen and regent, wife of George II of Great Britain (d. 1737)
- April 3 – Mark Catesby, English naturalist (d. 1749)
- June 23 – Étienne Fourmont, French orientalist (d. 1745)
- September 7 – Maria Anna of Austria, Archduchess of Austria and Queen consort of Portugal (d. 1754)
- September 11 – Farrukhsiyar, Mughal Emperor (d. 1719)
- September 25 – Jean-Philippe Rameau, French composer (d. 1764)
- October 17 – Aixinjueluo Yuntang, born Aixinjueluo Yintang, Qing prince (d. 1726)
- October 25 – Charles FitzRoy, 2nd Duke of Grafton, British politician (d. 1757)
- November 10 – King George II of Great Britain (d. 1760)
- November 30 – Ludwig Andreas von Khevenhüller, Austrian field marshal (d. 1744)
- December 19 – King Philip V of Spain (d. 1746)
- December 27 – Conyers Middleton, English minister (d. 1750)
- date unknown
  - Anna Maria Thelott, Swedish artist (d. 1710)
  - Benedicta Margareta von Löwendal, German industrialist (d. 1776)

1684

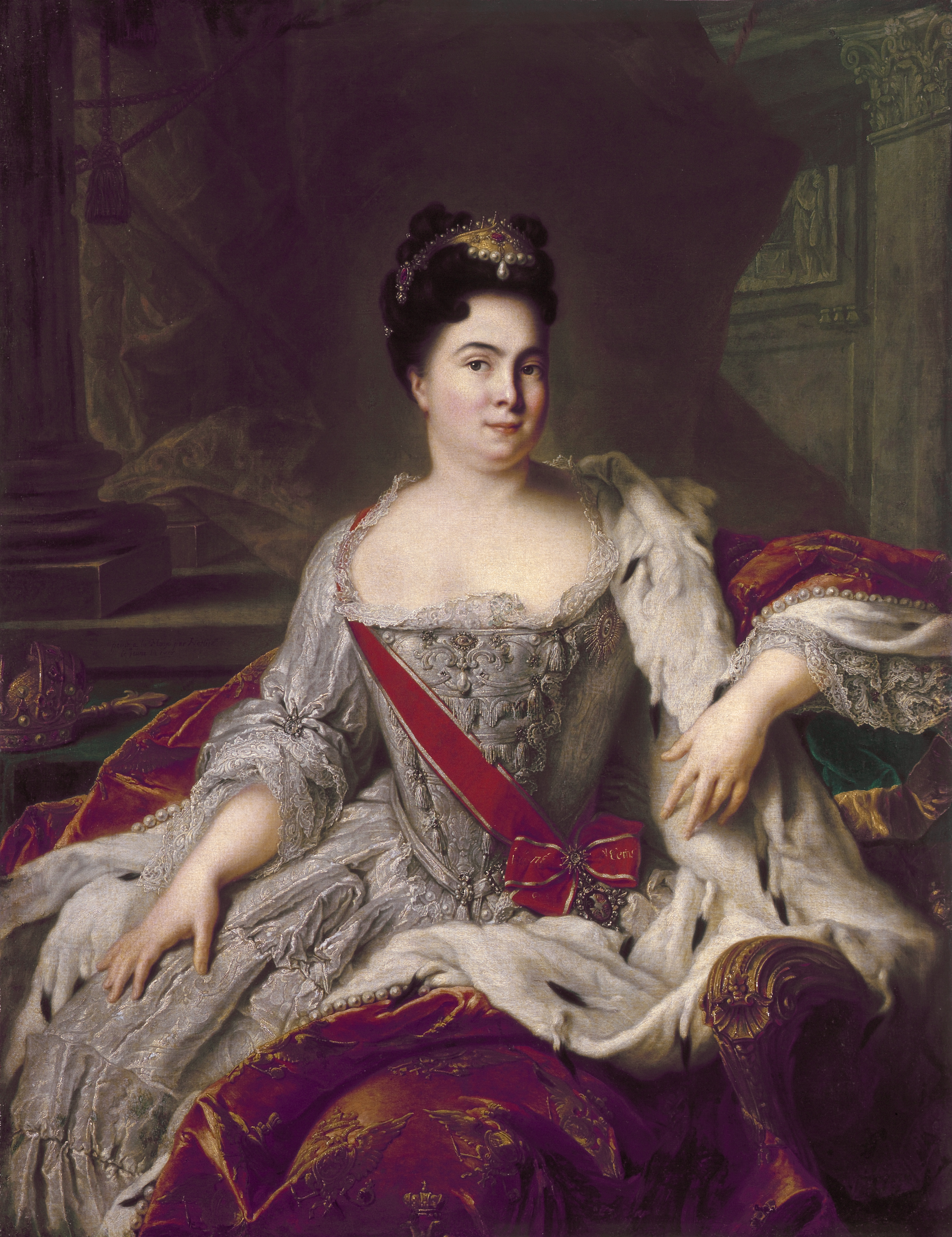
Catherine I of Russia

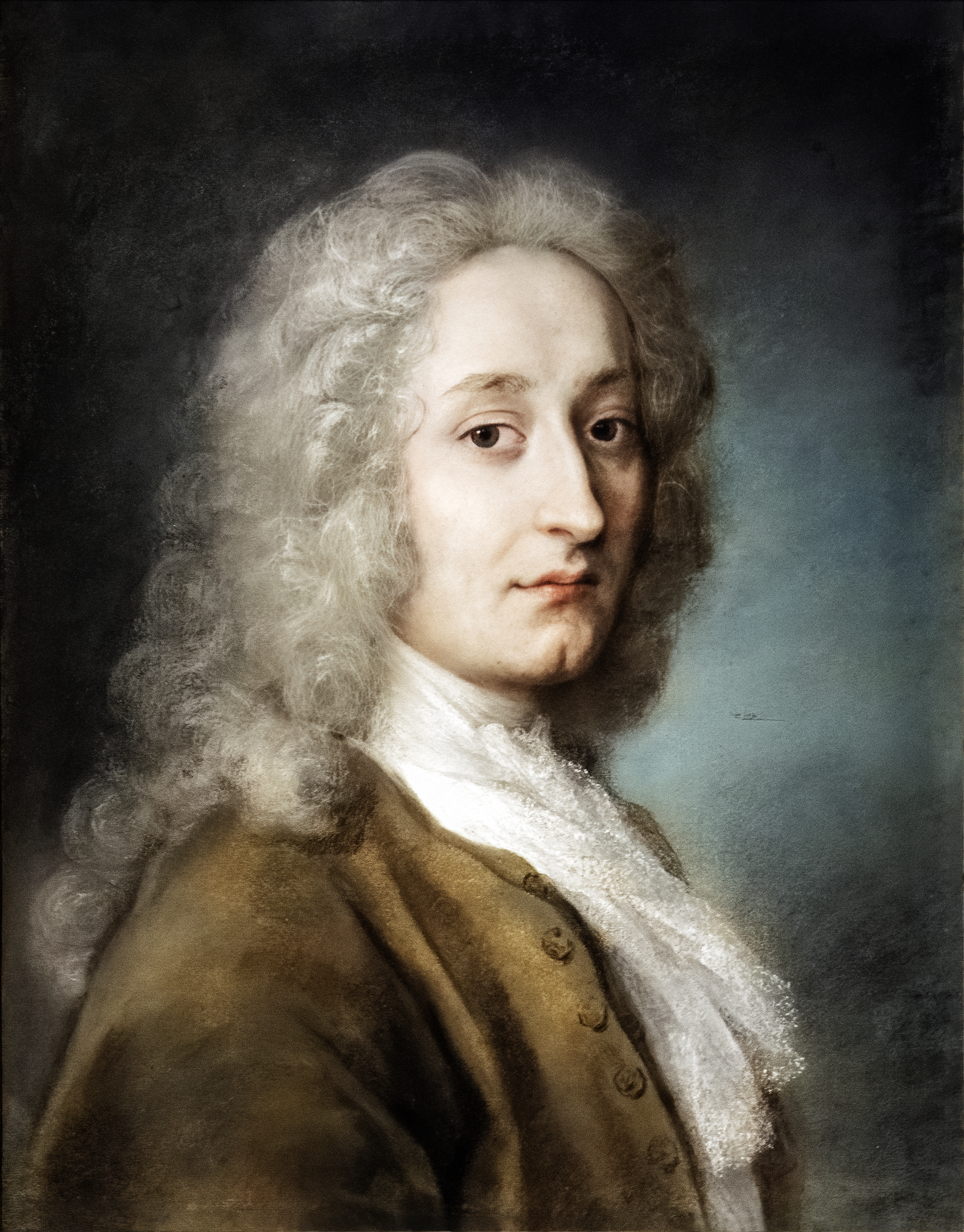
Jean-Antoine Watteau

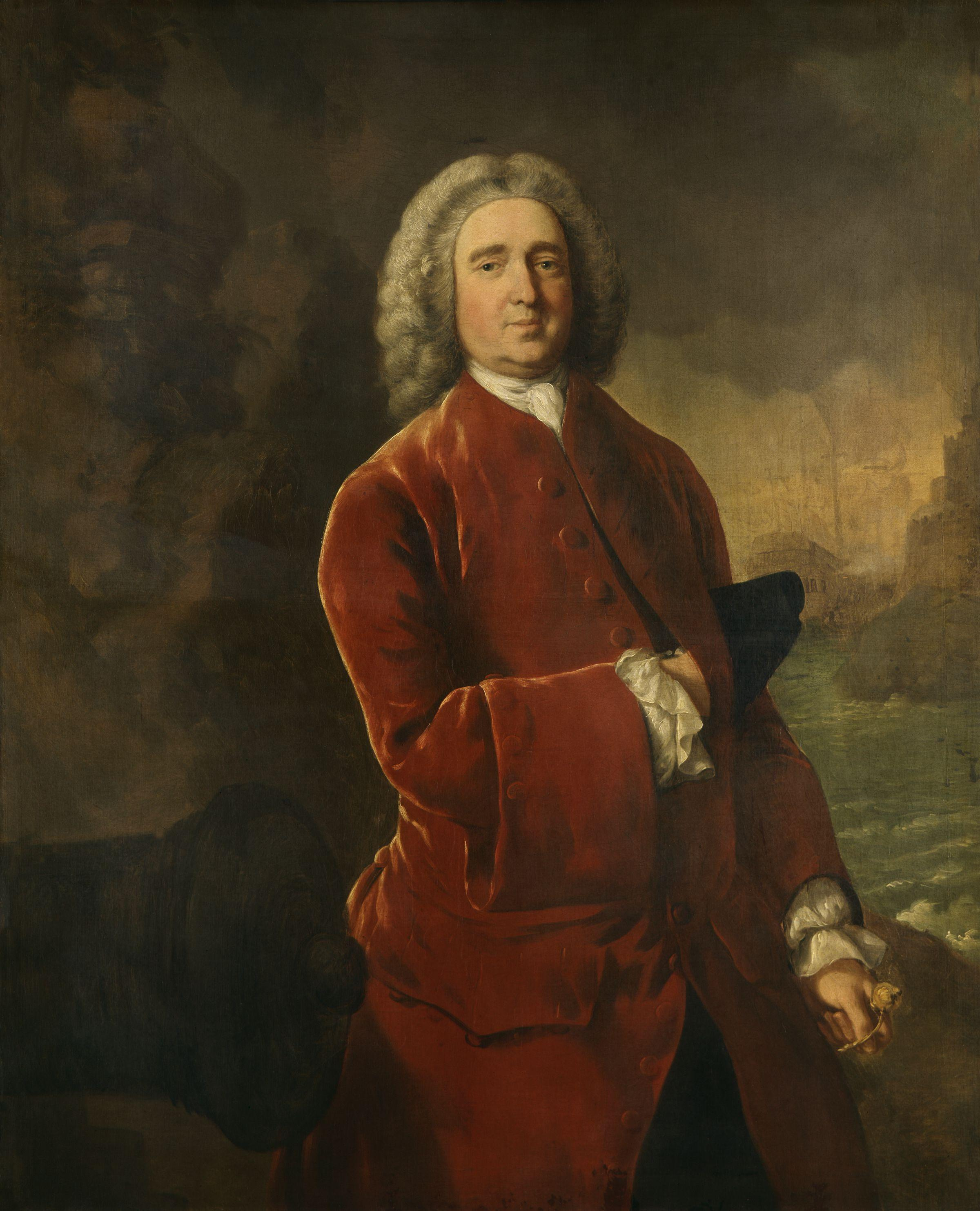
Edward Vernon

- January 1 – Arnold Drakenborch, Dutch classical scholar (d. 1748)
- January 4
  - Henry Coote, 5th Earl of Mountrath, British politician (d. 1720)
  - Henry Grove, English nonconformist minister (d. 1738)
- January 14
  - Johann Matthias Hase, German astronomer, mathematician and cartographer (d. 1742)
  - Jean-Baptiste van Loo, French subject and portrait painter (d. 1745)
- January 18 – Johann David Köhler, German historian (d. 1755)
- January 23 – Christian Rantzau, Danish noble (d. 1771)
- January 24 – Charles Alexander, Duke of Württemberg, regent of the Kingdom of Serbia (1720–1733) (d. 1737)
- February 16 – Bohuslav Matěj Černohorský, Czech composer (d. 1742)
- February 19 – George Duckett, English Member of Parliament (d. 1732)
- February 20 – Edward Bayly, Irish politician (d. 1741)
- February 21 – Justus van Effen, Dutch author (d. 1735)
- February 22 – Charles, Count of Armagnac, French noble (d. 1751)
- February 24 – Matthias Braun, Czech sculptor (d. 1738)
- March 2 – Christopher Wandesford, 2nd Viscount Castlecomer, Anglo-Irish Member of Parliament (d. 1719)
- March 19 – Jean Astruc, French physician and scholar (d. 1766)
- March 21 – Oley Douglas, English Member of Parliament (d. 1719)
- March 22
  - Matthias Bel, Hungarian pastor, polymath (d. 1749)
  - William Pulteney, 1st Earl of Bath, English noble (d. 1764)
- March 24 – Samuel von Schmettau, Prussian field marshal (d. 1751)
- March 28 – Tekle Haymanot I, Emperor of Ethiopia (d. 1708)
- March 31 – Francesco Durante, Neapolitan composer (d. 1755)
- April 2 – Henry Somerset, 2nd Duke of Beaufort, English noble (d. 1714)
- April 10 – Joseph Paris Duverney, French banker (d. 1770)
- April 15 – Catherine I of Russia, empress consort (d. 1727)
- April 25 – Marco Benefial, Italian painter (d. 1764)
- May 2 – William Henry, Prince of Nassau-Usingen, Prince of Nassau-Usingen (1702–1718) (d. 1718)
- May 5 – Françoise Charlotte d'Aubigné, French noble (d. 1739)
- May 23 – Hachisuka Muneteru, Japanese daimyō of the Edo period (d. 1743)
- May 27 – Wilhelm Reinhard von Neipperg, Austrian field marshal (d. 1774)
- May 31
  - Timothy Cutler, American Episcopal clergyman, rector of Yale College (d. 1765)
  - Georg Engelhard Schröder, Swedish artist (d. 1750)
- June 4 – Louis Charles, Duke of Schleswig-Holstein-Sonderburg-Franzhagen, German nobleman (d. 1707)
- June 6 – Nathaniel Lardner, English theologian (d. 1768)
- June 15 – Ernest Leopold, Landgrave of Hesse-Rotenburg, German noble (d. 1749)
- June 22 – Francesco Manfredini, Italian Baroque composer (d. 1762)
- July 3 – Jean-Baptiste Baudry, Canadian gunsmith (d. 1755)
- August 22 – Archduchess Maria Theresa of Austria (d. 1696)
- August 24 – Sir Robert Munro, 6th Baronet, British politician (d. 1746)
- August 30 – Marguerite de Launay, baronne de Staal, French author (d. 1750)
- September 1 – Jaime Álvares Pereira de Melo, 3rd Duke of Cadaval, Portuguese noble and statesman (d. 1749)
- September 17
  - Henry Cantrell, Anglican clergyman, writer (d. 1773)
  - Elizabeth Hanson, American captive of Native Americans and writer (d. 1737)
- September 18 – Johann Gottfried Walther, German music theorist, organist and composer (d. 1748)
- September 22 – Charles Louis Auguste Fouquet, duc de Belle-Isle, French general and statesman (d. 1761)
- October 2 – Thomas Seaton, English religious writer (d. 1741)
- October 8 – Karl Aigen, Austrian painter (d. 1762)
- October 9 – Christopher of Baden-Durlach, German prince (d. 1723)
- October 10 – Jean-Antoine Watteau, French painter (d. 1721)
- October 16 – Peter Walkden, English Presbyterian minister and diarist (d. 1769)
- October 26 – Kurt Christoph Graf von Schwerin, Prussian Generalfeldmarschall (d. 1757)
- October 28 – Paul Alphéran de Bussan, French bishop (d. 1757)
- November 1 – Mikhail Mikhailovich Golitsyn, Russian admiral (d. 1764)
- November 11 – Algernon Seymour, 7th Duke of Somerset, English noble (d. 1750)
- November 12 – Edward Vernon, English admiral (d. 1757)
- November 16 – Allen Bathurst, 1st Earl Bathurst, English noble (d. 1775)
- November 25 – Paul-Hippolyte de Beauvilliers, duke of Saint-Aignan, French diplomat and soldier (d. 1776)
- December 3 – Ludvig Holberg, Norwegian historian and writer (d. 1754)
- December 9 – Abraham Vater, German anatomist (d. 1751)
- December 14 – Siwart Haverkamp, Dutch classical scholar (d. 1742)
- December 15
  - James Jurin, British mathematician, doctor (d. 1750)
  - August Friedrich Müller, German legal scholar, logician (d. 1761)
- December 16 – Samuel Clark of St Albans, English theologian (d. 1750)
- December 21 – Ippolito Desideri, Italian Tibetologist (d. 1733)
- December 31 – William Grimston, 1st Viscount Grimston, Irish noble (d. 1756)
- Date unknown
  - Celia Grillo Borromeo, Genovese scientist and mathematician (d. 1777)
  - Jaime de la Té y Sagau, Spanish composer (d. 1736)

1685

George Frideric Handel

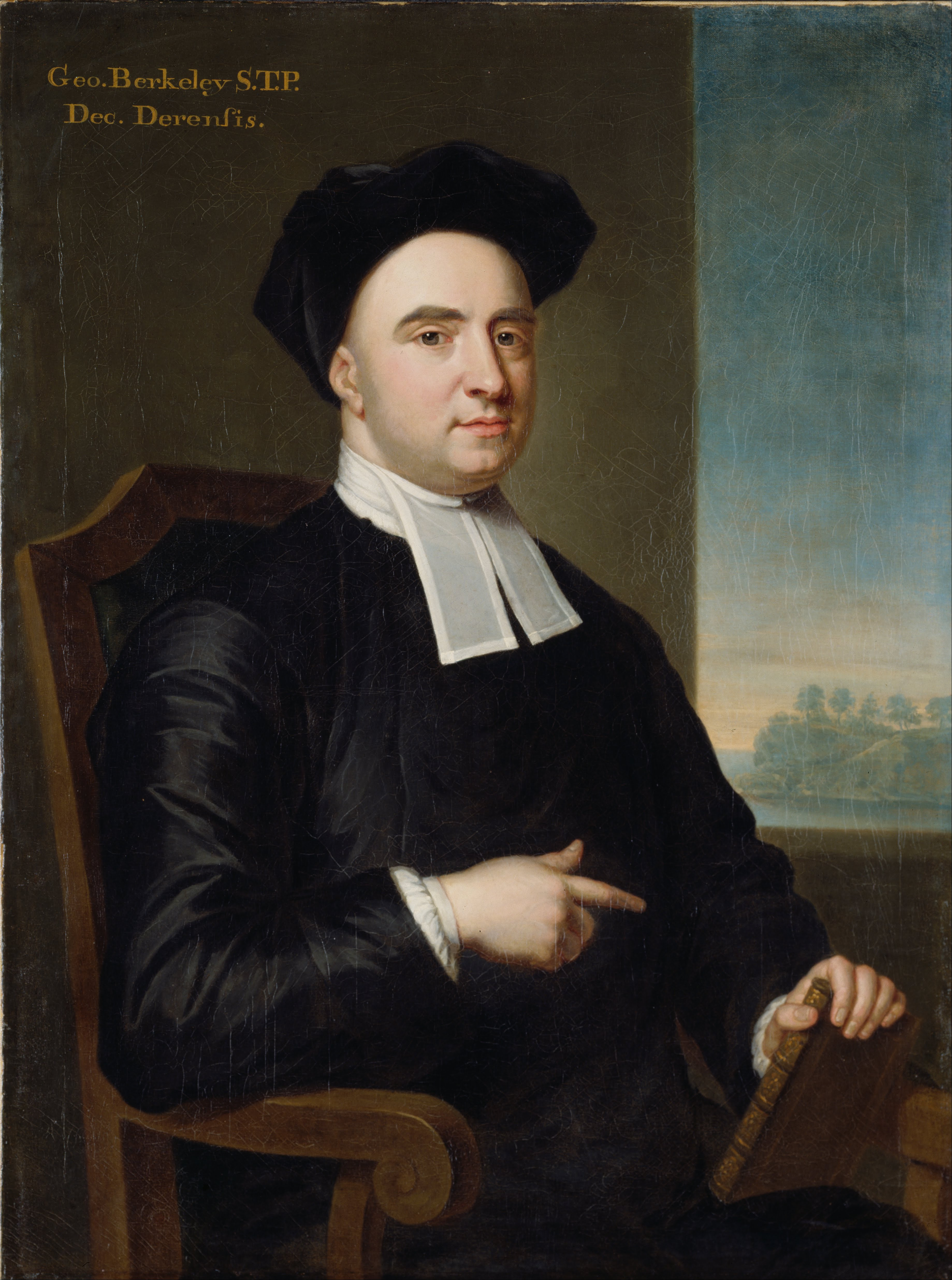
George Berkeley

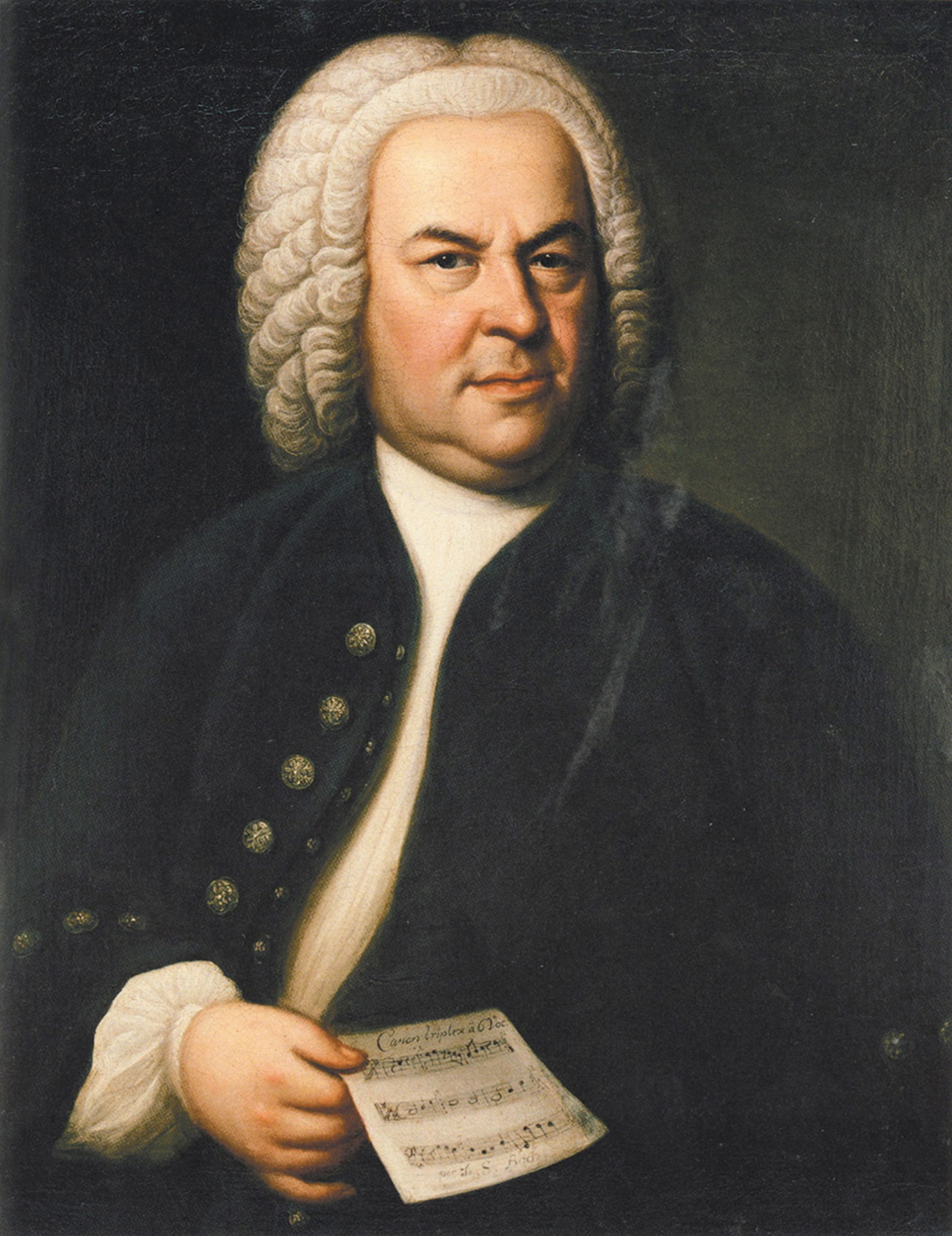
Johann Sebastian Bach

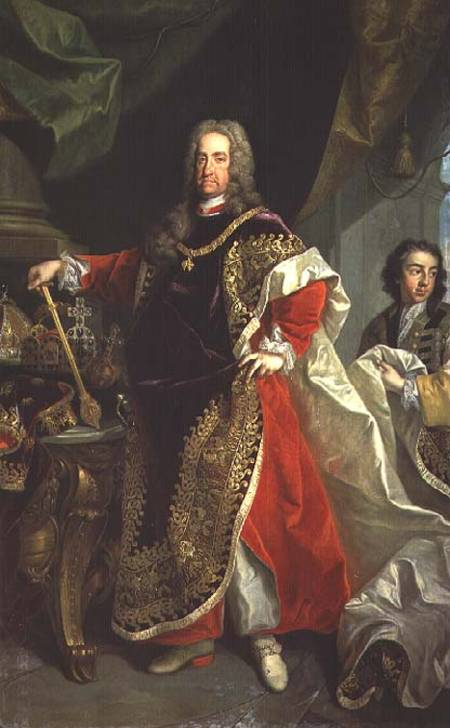
Charles VI

- January 1 – Joseph Burroughs, English minister (d. 1761)
- January 6 – Manuel de Montiano, Spanish colonial administrator (d. 1762)
- January 7
  - Jonas Alströmer, Swedish pioneer of agriculture and industry (d. 1761)
  - George Clifford III, Dutch banker and gardener (d. 1760)
- January 9 – Tiberius Hemsterhuis, Dutch philologist and critic (d. 1766)
- January 24 – Giuseppe Alessandro Furietti, Italian Catholic cardinal (d. 1764)
- February 6 – Sir John Rushout, 4th Baronet, England (d. 1775)
- February 8 – Charles-Jean-François Hénault, French writer and historian (d. 1770)
- February 9 – Francesco Loredan, Doge of Venice (d. 1762)
- February 10 – Aaron Hill (writer), English dramatist and miscellaneous writer (d. 1750)
- February 12 – George Hadley, English lawyer and amateur meteorologist (d. 1768)
- February 23 – George Frideric Handel, German composer (d. 1759)
- February 24 – Hieronymus Pez, Austrian historian (d. 1762)
- March 2 – Moses Williams (antiquarian), Welsh scholar (d. 1742)
- March 11
  - William Flower, 1st Baron Castle Durrow, Irish politician (d. 1746)
  - Jean-Pierre Nicéron, French encyclopedist (d. 1738)
- March 12 – George Berkeley, Irish philosopher (d. 1753)
- March 13 – Johann Paul Schiffelholz, German Baroque composer (d. 1758)
- March 17 – Jean-Marc Nattier, French painter (d. 1766)
- March 18 – Ralph Erskine (preacher), Scottish churchman (d. 1752)
- March 24 – John Fane, 7th Earl of Westmorland, British politician (d. 1762)
- March 26
  - Germain Louis Chauvelin, French politician (d. 1762)
  - Johann Alexander Thiele, German painter (d. 1752)
- March 27 – Simon Hatley, English sailor (d. 1723)
- March 31 – Johann Sebastian Bach, German composer (d. 1750)
- April 4 – Claude Sallier, French librarian (d. 1761)
- April 18 – Jacques-Pierre de Taffanel de la Jonquière, Marquis de la Jonquière, French admiral, colonial administrator (d. 1752)
- April 24 – Cosimo Imperiali, Italian cardinal (d. 1764)
- April 30 – Hermann Friedrich Teichmeyer, German botanist (d. 1746)
- May 4 – Akdun, Chinese Manchu statesman (d. 1756)
- May 6 – Sophia Louise of Mecklenburg-Schwerin, Prussian queen consort (d. 1735)
- May 19 – Neri Maria Corsini, Italian Catholic priest and cardinal (d. 1770)
- June 6 – Spencer Phips, Acting governor of the Province of Massachusetts Bay (d. 1757)
- June 10 – Harry Grey, 3rd Earl of Stamford, English peer (d. 1739)
- June 11 – Thomas Wedgwood III, English potter, father of Josiah Wedgwood (d. 1739)
- June 14 – Princess Charlotte Wilhelmine of Saxe-Coburg-Saalfeld, countess by marriage of Hanau-Münzenberg (d. 1767)
- June 23 – Antonio Bernacchi, Italian opera singer (d. 1756)
- June 24 – Hans von Lehwaldt, German general (d. 1768)
- June 30
  - John Gay, English writer (d. 1732)
  - Dominikus Zimmermann, German Rococo architect, stuccoist (d. 1766)
- July 3 – Sir Robert Rich, 4th Baronet, British cavalry officer (d. 1768)
- July 22 – Henrik Magnus von Buddenbrock, Swedish general, noble (d. 1743)
- July 28 – Richard Newport (MP) (d. 1716)
- August 6 – Martin Bouquet, French Benedictine monk and historian (d. 1754)
- August 7 – Claude Lamoral, 6th Prince of Ligne, Austrian field marshal (d. 1766)
- August 8 – Claude Joseph Geoffroy, brother of Étienne François Geoffroy (d. 1752)
- August 15 – Jacob Theodor Klein, German scholar (d. 1759)
- August 18 – Brook Taylor, English mathematician (d. 1731)
- September 2 – Christiane Charlotte of Nassau-Ottweiler, Countess, later Landgravine of Hesse-Homburg (d. 1761)
- September 3 – Charles Powlett, 3rd Duke of Bolton (d. 1754)
- September 4 – Johann Adolf II, Duke of Saxe-Weissenfels (d. 1746)
- September 14 – Didier Diderot, French craftsman (d. 1759)
- September 16 – Daniel Gottlieb Messerschmidt, German scientist (d. 1735)
- September 17
  - Joshua Allen, 2nd Viscount Allen, Irish politician (d. 1742)
  - Charles August, Prince of Nassau-Weilburg, Prince of Nassau-Weilburg (1719-1753) (d. 1753)
  - Robert Marsham, 1st Baron Romney, British politician (d. 1724)
  - Uvedale Tomkins Price, British politician (d. 1764)
- September 20 – Giuseppe Matteo Alberti, Italian Baroque composer and violinist (d. 1751)
- September 29 – George Brudenell, 3rd Earl of Cardigan (d. 1732)
- October 1 – Charles VI, Holy Roman Emperor (d. 1740)
- October 13 – Henri François Le Dran, French surgeon (d. 1770)
- October 15 – Diederik van Domburg, 23rd Governor of Zeylan, during the Dutch period in Ceylon (d. 1736)
- October 21 – George Forbes, 3rd Earl of Granard, English Royal Navy admiral (d. 1765)
- October 26 – Domenico Scarlatti, Italian composer (d. 1757)
- October 28 – Hans Gram (historian), Danish historian (d. 1748)
- October 31 – John Murray, 2nd Earl of Dunmore, Scottish soldier and peer (d. 1752)
- November 3 – François Roettiers, Flemish engraver, medallist, painter, sculptor (d. 1742)
- November 5 – Peter Angelis, French painter (d. 1734)
- November 7
  - Jared Eliot, Connecticut farmer, author on horticulture (d. 1763)
  - Georg Lenck, German musician (d. 1744)
- November 10 – Duncan Forbes, Lord Culloden, Scottish politician, judge (d. 1747)
- November 11
  - Florida Cevoli, Italian Capuchin Poor Clare (d. 1767)
  - Jean Charles de Saint-Nectaire, French general (d. 1771)
- November 15 – Balthasar Denner, German artist (d. 1749)
- November 17 – Pierre Gaultier de Varennes, sieur de La Vérendrye, French Canadian military officer (d. 1749)
- November 24 – Princess Dorothea of Schleswig-Holstein-Sonderburg-Beck, German noble (d. 1761)
- November 25 – Eiler Hagerup d.e., Norwegian bishop (d. 1743)
- November 29 – John Willes (judge), English lawyer (d. 1761)
- December 6 – Marie Adélaïde of Savoy, wife of Louis, Dauphin of France, Duke of Burgundy (d. 1712)
- December 8 – Johann Maria Farina, Italian-born German perfumier (d. 1766)
- December 12 – Lodovico Giustini, Italian composer (d. 1743)
- December 17 – Thomas Tickell, minor English poet and man of letters (d. 1740)
- date unknown
  - Henri-Guillaume Hamal, Walloon musician and composer (d. 1752)
  - Antoinette Larcher, French engraver (d. unknown)
  - Aldegonde Jeanne Pauli, banker in the Austrian Netherlands (d. 1761)
  - Mary Read, English-born pirate (d. 1721)
  - Marie Wulf, Danish Pietist leader (d. 1738)

1686

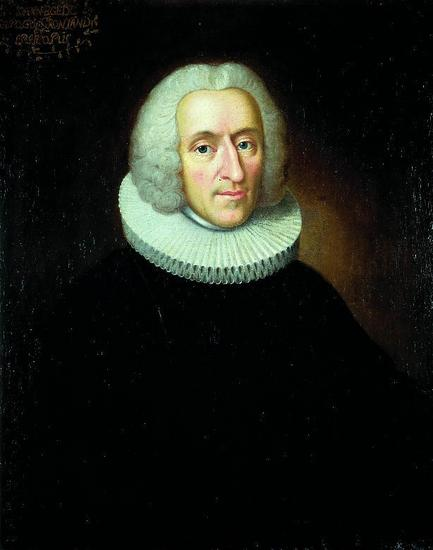
Hans Egede

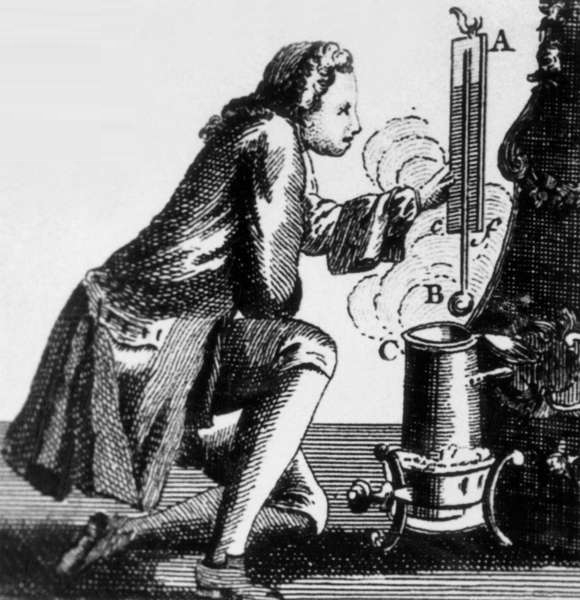
Daniel Gabriel Fahrenheit

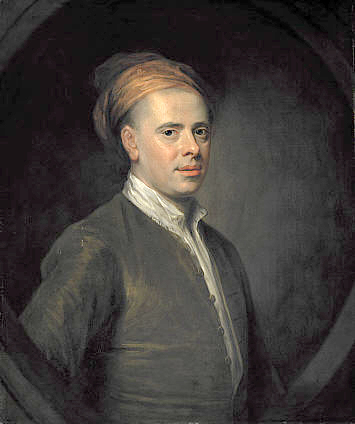
Allan Ramsay

- January 8 – William Frederick, Margrave of Brandenburg-Ansbach, Margrave of Brandenburg-Ansbach (1703–1723) (d. 1723)
- January 12 – Adam Christian Thebesius, German anatomist (d. 1732)
- January 17 – Archibald Bower, Scottish historian (d. 1766)
- January 23 – Moritz Georg Weidmann, German bookseller (d. 1743)
- January 31 – Hans Egede, Norwegian Lutheran missionary who launched mission efforts to Greenland (d. 1758)
- February 1 – Suzanne Henriette of Lorraine, French noblewoman, Duchess of Mantua and Montferrat (d. 1710)
- February 2 – John Eames, English academic (d. 1744)
- February 10 – Jan Frederik Gronovius, Dutch botanist notable as a patron of Linnaeus (d. 1762)
- February 11 – William Bowles, British politician (d. 1748)
- February 13 – John Churchill, Marquess of Blandford, British noble (d. 1703)
- February 14 – Harry Pulteney, British politician (d. 1767)
- February 16 – Eleonore of Löwenstein-Wertheim, German countess (d. 1753)
- March 17 – Jean-Baptiste Oudry, French painter (d. 1755)
- March 22 – James Hamilton, 7th Earl of Abercorn (d. 1744)
- March 27 – Johann Jakob Quandt, Lutheran theologian, translated the Bible into Lithuanian (d. 1772)
- April 1 – Jan Frans van Bredael, Flemish painter (d. 1750)
- April 7 – François Victor Le Tonnelier de Breteuil, French nobleman (d. 1743)
- April 8 – Stefano Felice Ficatelli, Italian painter of the late Baroque period (d. 1771)
- April 9 – James Craggs the Younger, English politician (d. 1721)
- April 19 – Vasily Tatishchev, Russian statesman, ethnographer (d. 1750)
- April 28 – Michael Brokoff, Czech sculptor (d. 1721)
- April 29 – Peregrine Bertie, 2nd Duke of Ancaster and Kesteven (d. 1742)
- May 19 – Samuel-Jacques Bernard, French billionaire (d. 1753)
- May 24 – Gabriel Fahrenheit, German physicist, inventor of the Fahrenheit temperature scale (d. 1736)
- May 25 – William Steuart (d. 1768)
- May 31 – Antonina Houbraken, Dutch artist (d. 1736)
- June 5
  - Edward Howard, 9th Duke of Norfolk, British peer (d. 1777)
  - Ignatius of Santhià, Italian Catholic priest (d. 1770)
- June 6 – John Reading, Colonial Governor of New Jersey (d. 1767)
- June 7
  - Adolphus Frederick III, Duke of Mecklenburg-Strelitz (d. 1752)
  - Armand de La Richardie, French missionary (d. 1758)
- June 9
  - Andrei Osterman, Russian statesman (d. 1747)
  - Andrew Michael Ramsay, Scottish writer (d. 1743)
- June 24 – Domenico Montagnana, Italian luthier (d. 1750)
- June 29 – Pietro Paolo Troisi, Maltese artist (d. 1743)
- July 3 – Edward Watson, Viscount Sondes, Member of the Parliament of Great Britain (d. 1722)
- July 5 – Jan Macaré, interim Dutch governor of Ceylon (d. 1742)
- July 6 – Antoine de Jussieu, French naturalist (d. 1758)
- July 9 – Philip Livingston, American politician (d. 1749)
- July 24 – Benedetto Marcello, Italian composer (d. 1739)
- July 25 – William Hardres, British politician (d. 1736)
- July 27 – Mary Butterworth, American colonial counterfeiter (d. 1775)
- July 31 – Charles, Duke of Berry, grandson of Louis XIV of France (d. 1714)
- August 3 – Gervais Baudoin, Canadian physician (d. 1752)
- August 10 – Johann Georg Christian, Prince of Lobkowicz, Austrian field marshal (d. 1755)
- August 12
  - John Balguy, English divine and philosopher (d. 1748)
  - Bendix Grodtschilling the Youngest, Danish painter (d. 1737)
- August 17 – Nicola Porpora, Neapolitan composer of Baroque operas and teacher of singing (d. 1768)
- August 18 – Peter von Bemmel, German artist (d. 1754)
- August 19 – Eustace Budgell, English writer and politician (d. 1737)
- August 22 – Albert Schultens, Dutch philologist (d. 1750)
- August 26 or August 27 – Agostino Cornacchini, Italian sculptor and painter of the Rococo period (d. 1754)
- August 29 – Aloysius Centurione, Italian Jesuit (d. 1757)
- September 5 – Antoine Touron, French historian (d. 1775)
- September 29 – Cosmas Damian Asam, German painter and architect during the late Baroque period (d. 1739)
- September 30 – John Alexander (d. 1743)
- October 15 – Allan Ramsay, Scottish poet (or makar) (d. 1758)
- October 17 – Jacques Hardion, French historian (d. 1766)
- October 17 (bapt.) ? – John Machin, English mathematician (d. 1751)
- October 19 – Peter van der Bosch, Jesuit hagiographer (d. 1736)
- October 30 – Charles Jean-Baptiste Fleuriau, French politician (d. 1732)
- October 31 – Senesino, Italian singer (d. 1758)
- November 1
  - Colin Campbell, Scottish businessman (d. 1757)
  - Axel Löwen, Swedish duke (d. 1773)
- November 13 – Eleonora Luisa Gonzaga, Tuscan princess (d. 1741)
- November 15 – Claude Louis d'Espinchal, marquis de Massiac, French politician (d. 1770)
- November 16 – Yinxiang, Manchu prince of the Qing Dynasty (d. 1730)
- November 23 – Ignácio Barbosa-Machado, Portuguese historian (d. 1734)
- November 30 – Richard Lumley, 2nd Earl of Scarbrough (d. 1740)
- December 8 – John Dawnay, British politician (d. 1740)
- December 15 – Jean-Joseph Fiocco, Flemish composer (d. 1746)
- December 25 – Giovanni Battista Somis, Italian violinist and composer (d. 1763)
- date unknown –
  - William Law, English cleric (d. 1761)
  - Netawatwees, Indigenous American (Lenape) leader (d. 1776)
- approximate date – Queen Nanny of the Maroons, Jamaican national heroine (d. 1755)

1687

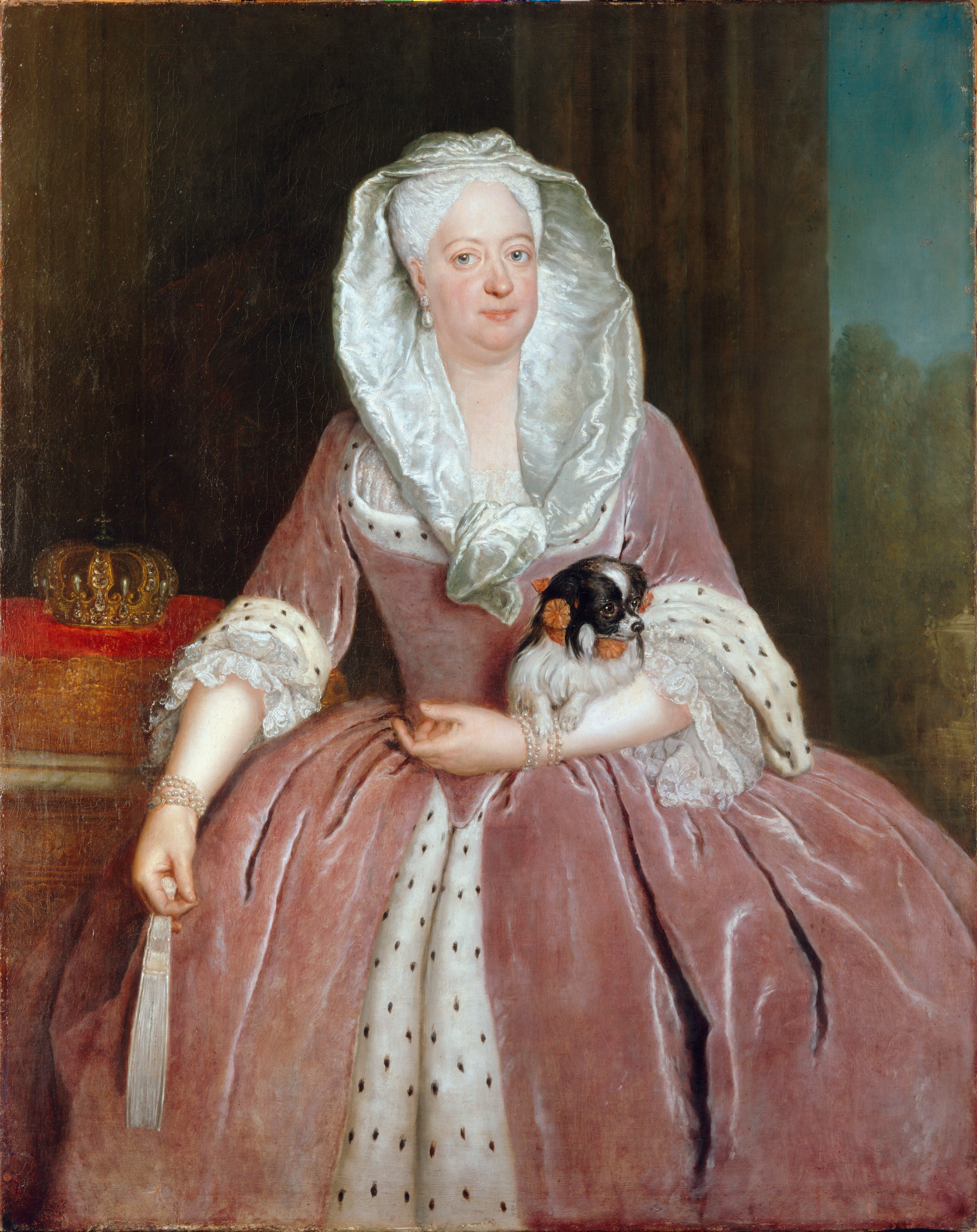
Sophia Dorothea of Hanover

- January 27 – Johann Balthasar Neumann, German architect (d. 1753)
- February 4 – Joseph Effner, German architect (d. 1745)
- March 7 – Jean Lebeuf, French historian (d. 1760)
- March 16 – Sophia Dorothea of Hanover, queen consort of Frederick William I (d. 1757)
- May 12 – Johann Heinrich Schulze, German professor and polymath (d. 1744)
- June 24 – Johann Albrecht Bengel, German scholar (d. 1752)
- September 7 – Durastante Natalucci, Italian historian (d. 1772)
- October 4 – Robert Simson, Scottish mathematician (d. 1768)
- October 5 – Maria Maddalena Martinengo, Italian nun (d. 1737)
- October 21 – Nicolaus I Bernoulli, Swiss mathematician (d. 1759)
- November 7 – William Stukeley, English archaeologist (d. 1765)
- December 5 – Francesco Geminiani, Italian violinist and composer (d. 1762)
- December 24 – Richard Hancorne, Welsh clergyman (d. 1732)
- December 26 – Johann Georg Pisendel, German musician (d. 1755)
- date unknown
  - Gabriel de Clieu, French naval officer and governor of Guadeloupe (1737-1752) (d. 1774)
  - Shahzada Assadullah Khan Abdali, Persian Governor of Herat (d. 1720)

1688

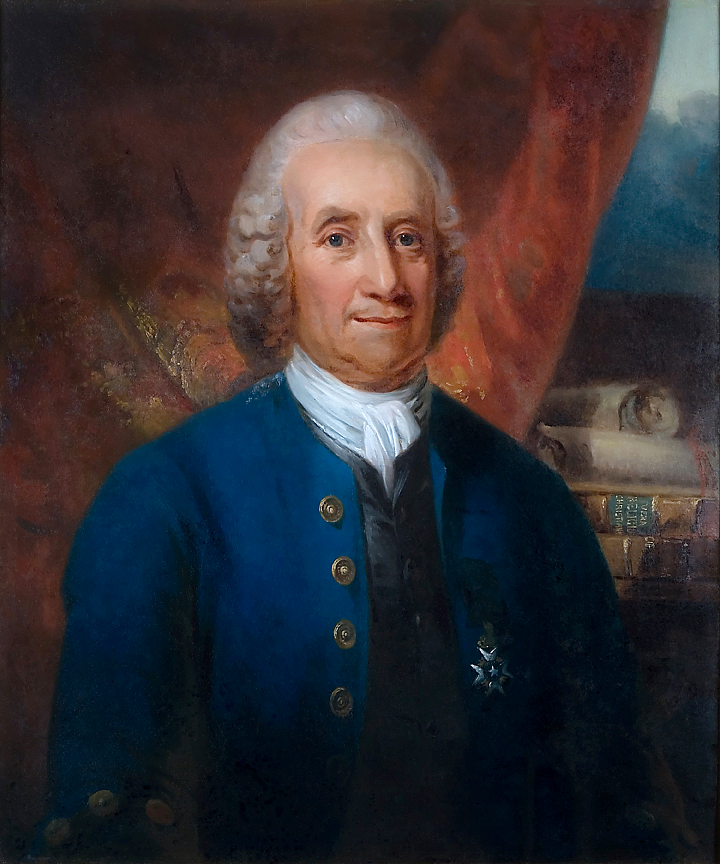
Emanuel Swedenborg

- January 15 – Maria van Lommen, Dutch gold- and silversmith (d. 1742)
- January 18 – Lionel Cranfield Sackville, 1st Duke of Dorset, Lord Lieutenant of Ireland (d. 1765)
- January 23 – Queen Ulrika Eleonora of Sweden (d. 1741)
- January 29 – Emanuel Swedenborg, Swedish scientist, philosopher and theologian (d. 1772)
- February 4 – Pierre de Marivaux, French playwright (d. 1763)
- March – William Burnet, British colonial administrator (d. 1729)
- March 14 – Anna Maria Garthwaite, British designer (d. 1763)
- April 4 – Joseph-Nicolas Delisle, French astronomer (d. 1768)
- April 15 – Johann Friedrich Fasch, German composer (d. 1758)
- May 21 – Alexander Pope, English poet (d. 1744)
- June 10 – James Francis Edward Stuart, The Old Pretender, claimant to the English and Scottish throne (d. 1766)
- July 19 – Giuseppe Castiglione, Italian missionary to China (d. 1766)
- June 30 – Abu l-Hasan Ali I, ruler of Tunisia (d. 1756)
- August 14 – King Frederick William I of Prussia (d. 1740)
- September 12 – Ferdinand Brokoff, Czech sculptor (d. 1731)
- October 17 – Domenico Zipoli, Italian-born composer (d. 1726)
- October 22 – Nader Shah of Persia (d. 1747)
- November 15 (bapt.) – Charles Rivington, English publisher (d. 1742)

1689

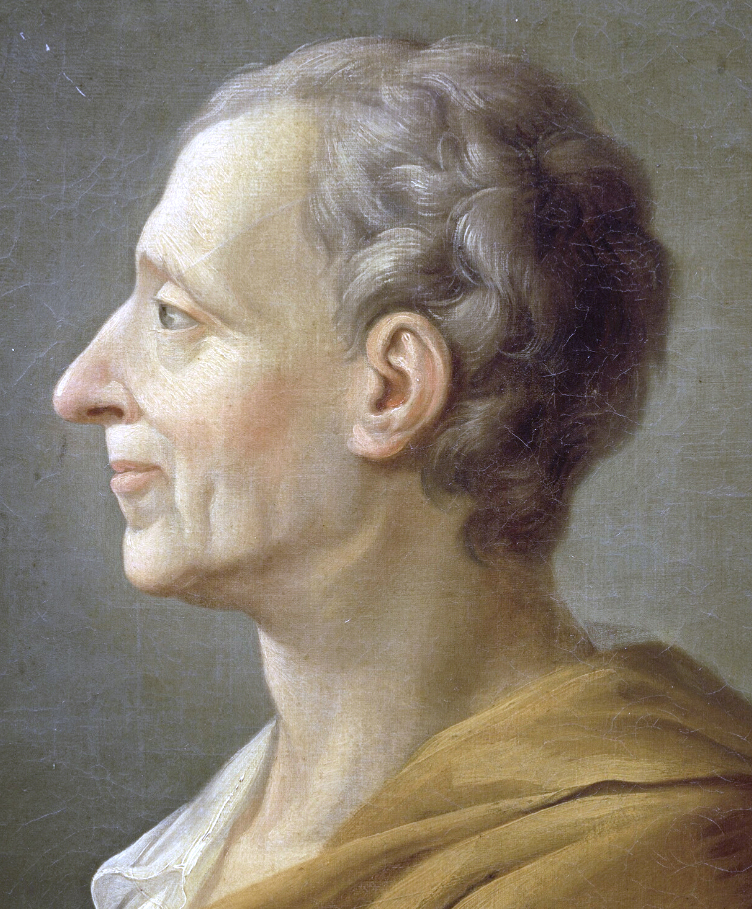
Montesquieu born 18 January

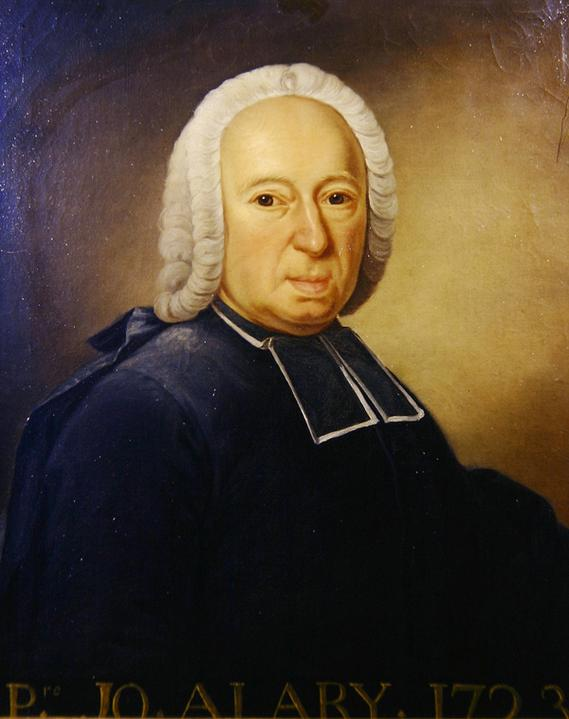
Pierre-Joseph Alary born 19 March

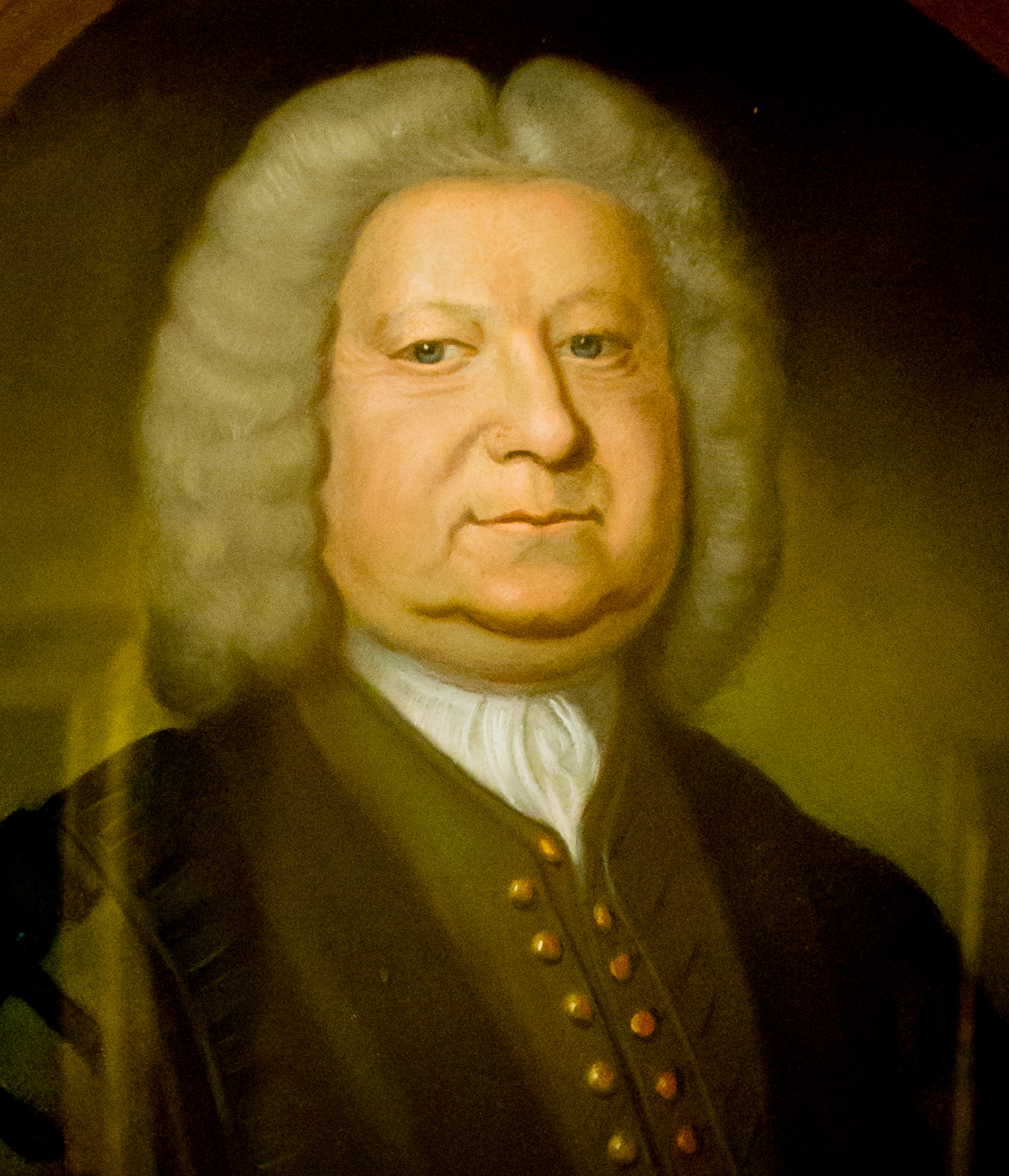
Richard Ward (governor) born 15 April

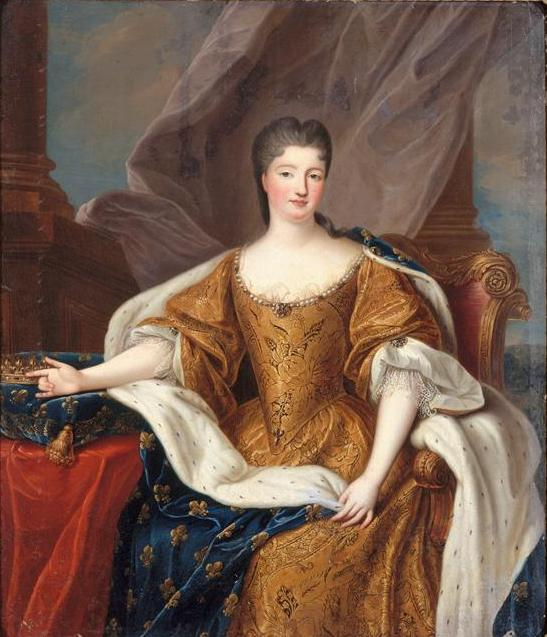
Marie Anne de Bourbon born 18 April

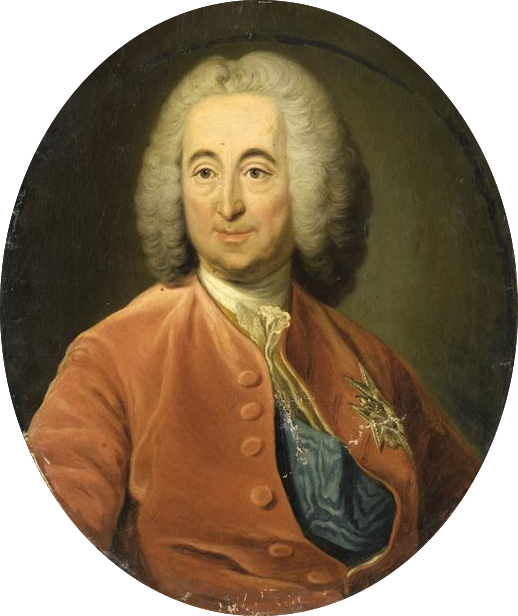
Antoine Louis Rouillé born 7 June

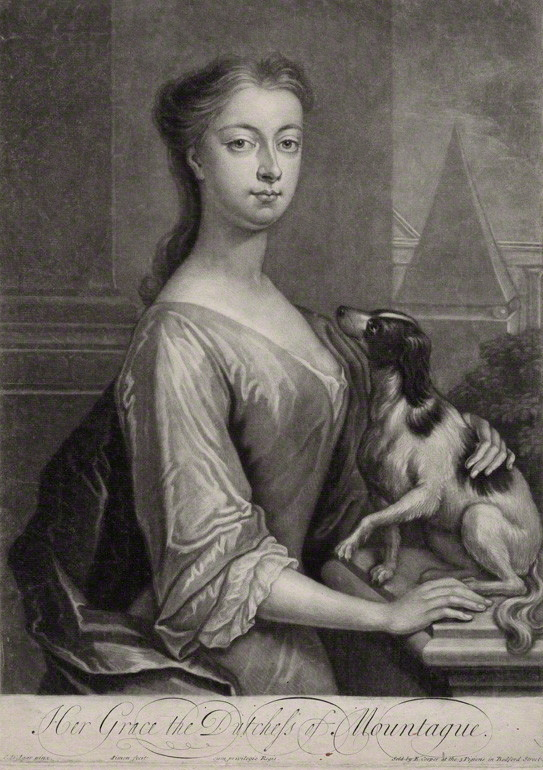
Mary Montagu, Duchess of Montagu born 15 July

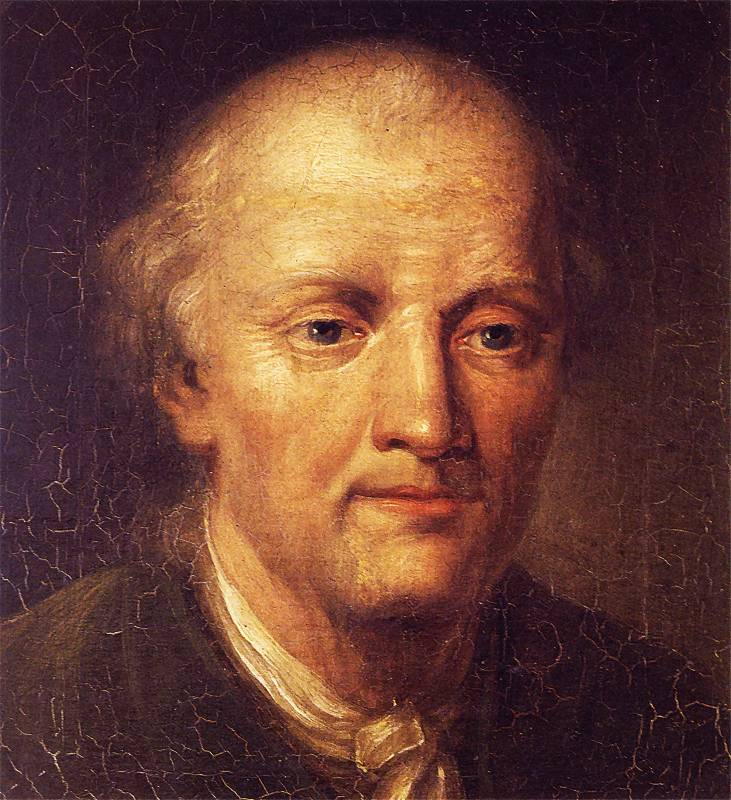
Szymon Czechowicz born 22 July

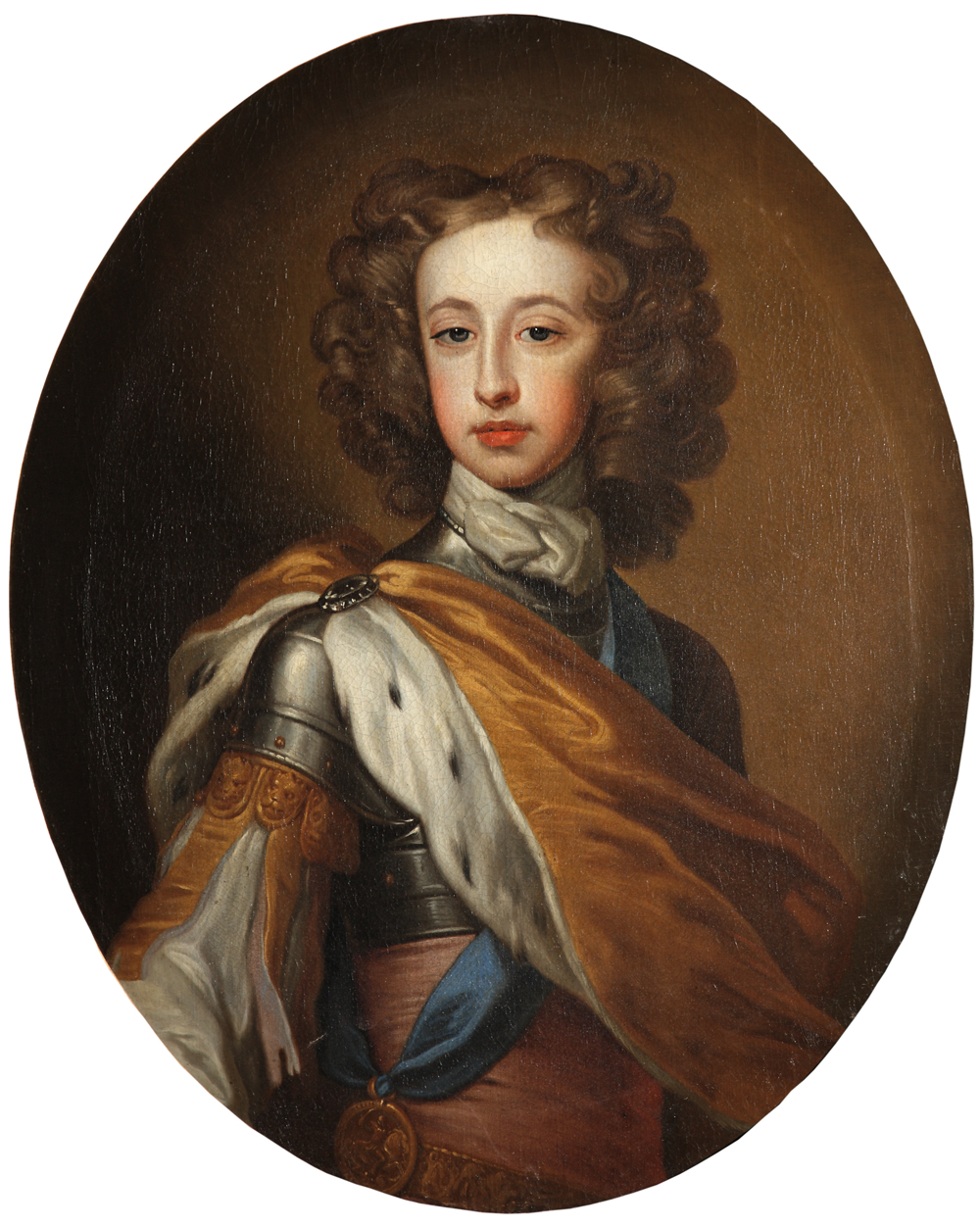
Prince William, Duke of Gloucester born 24 July

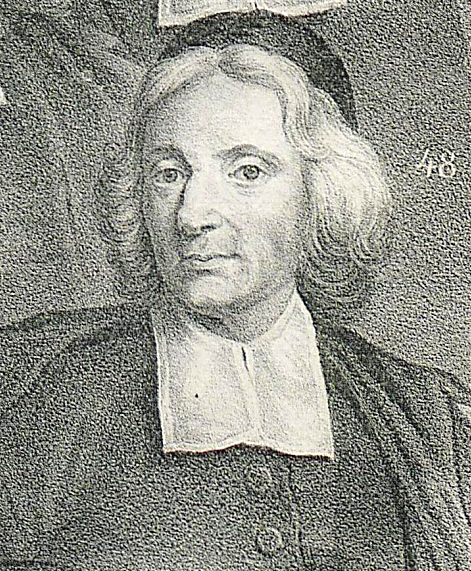
Henric Benzelius born 7 August

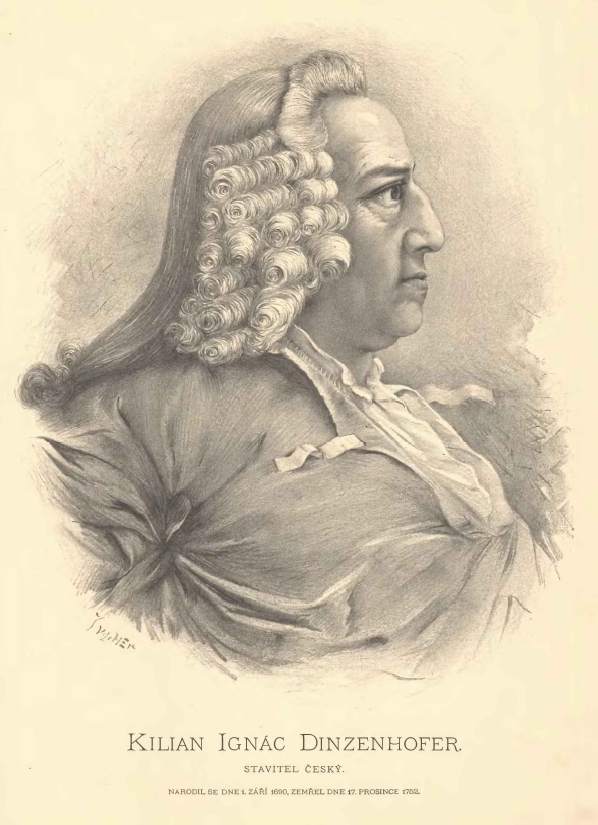
Kilian Ignaz Dientzenhofer born 1 September

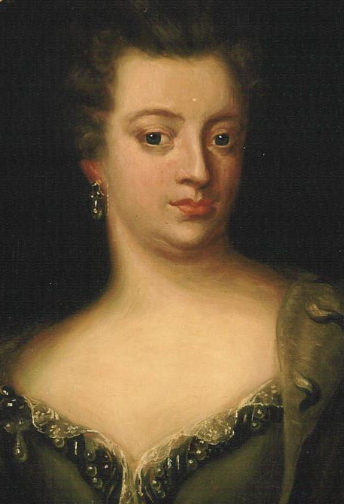
Anna Sophie Schack born 4 September

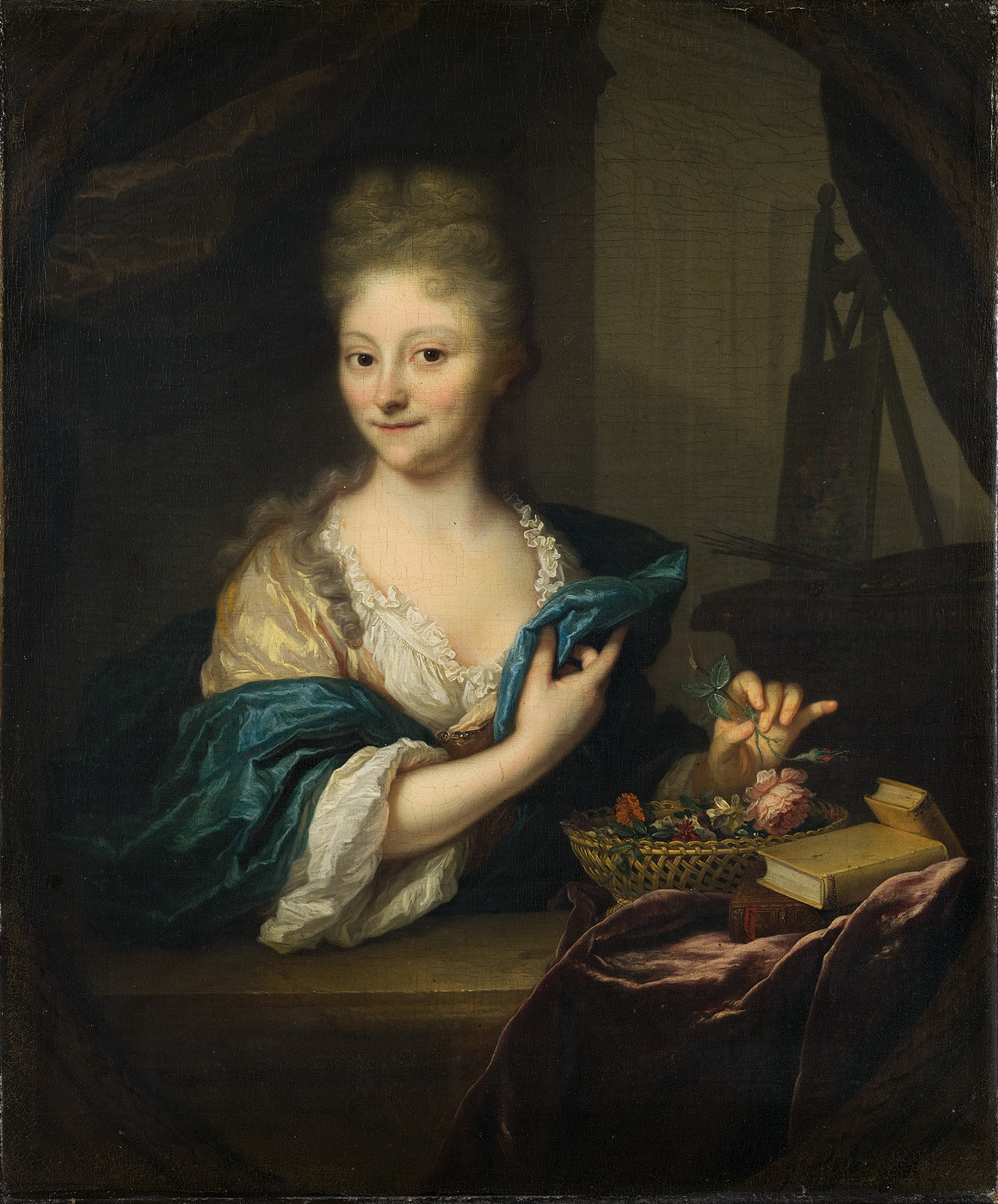
Catharina Backer born 22 September

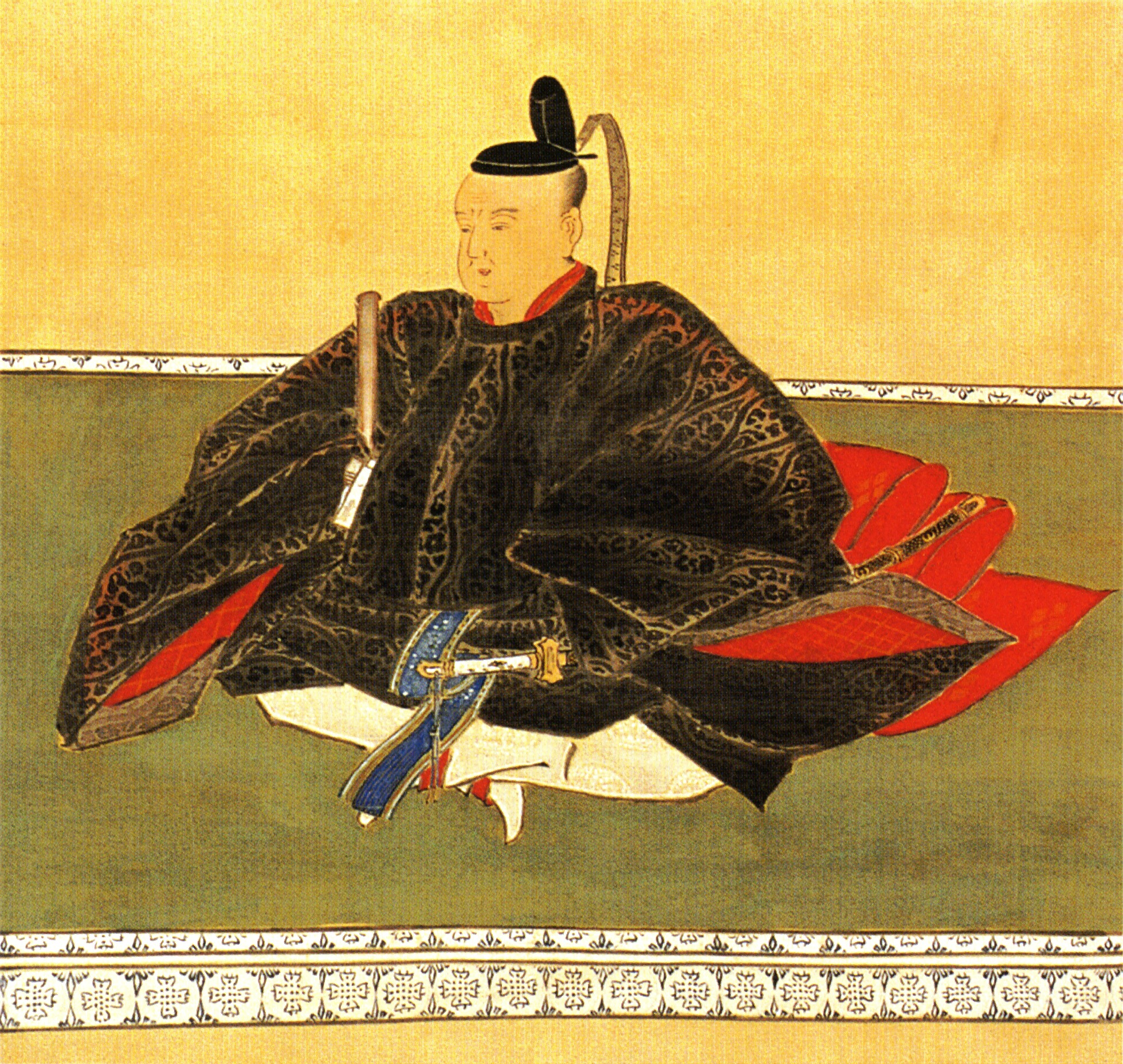
Nijō Yoshitada born 26 September

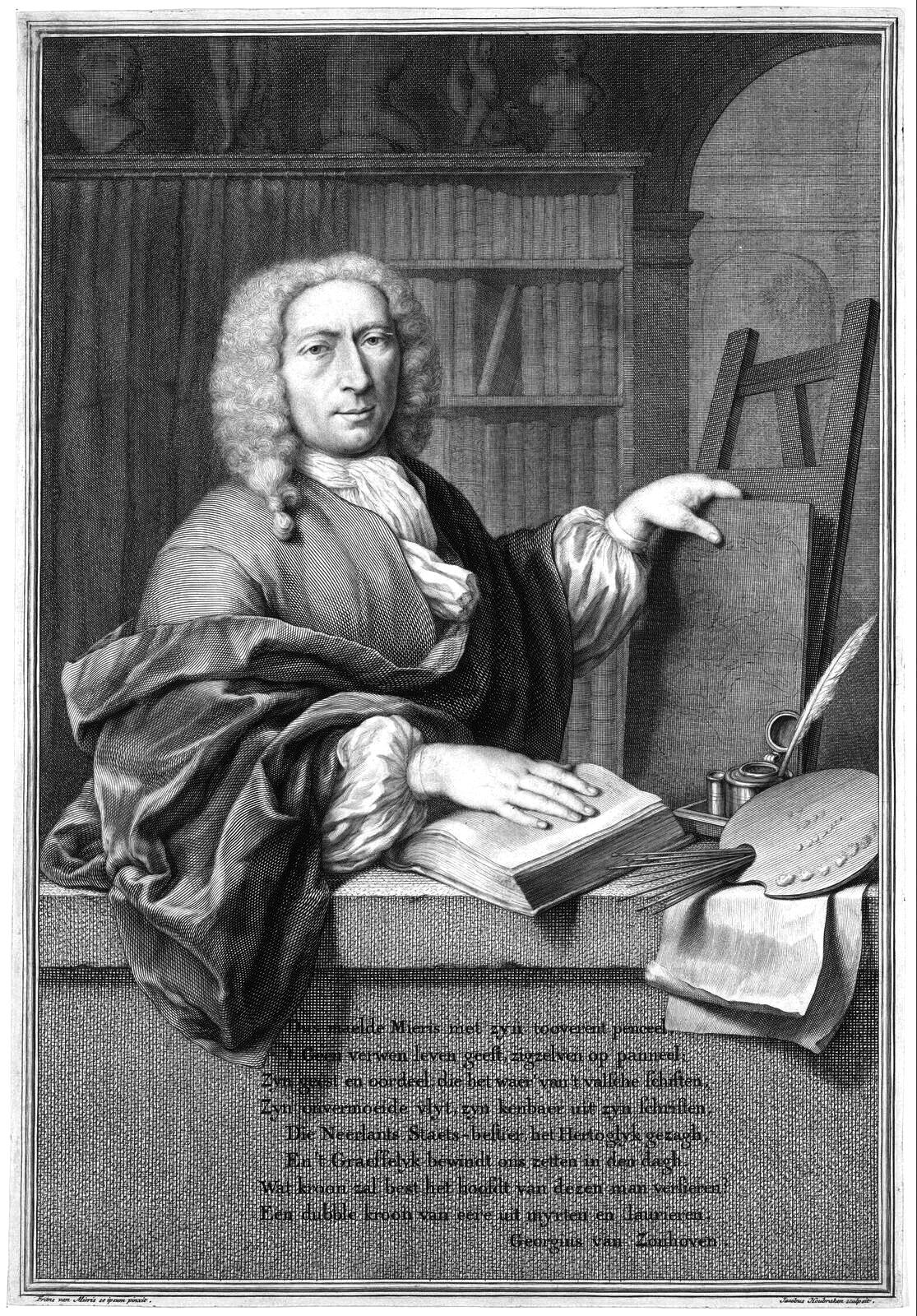
Frans van Mieris the Younger born 24 December

- January 7 – Robert Murray, Brigadier-General, Scottish soldier, Member of Parliament (d. 1738)
- January 11 – Charles Parkin, English clergyman and antiquarian (d. 1765)
- January 15 – Giovanni Gaetano Bottari, Italian scholar and critic (d. 1775)
- January 16 – Edmond Jean François Barbier, French historian (d. 1771)
- January 18
  - Montesquieu, French social commentator and political thinker (d. 1755)
  - Jan Abel Wassenbergh, painter from the Northern Netherlands (d. 1750)
- January 21 – Daniel Henchman, bookseller (d. 1761)
- January 22 – Philibert Orry, French politician (d. 1747)
- January 23 – Joseph Ames, English bibliographer and antiquary (d. 1759)
- January 24 – Gaspare Diziani, Italian painter (d. 1767)
- January 29 – James Rait, Bishop of Brechin (d. 1777)
- February 1 – Thomas Jenner, English academic (d. 1768)
- February 3 – Blas de Lezo, admiral of the Spanish Empire (d. 1741)
- February 23 – Leonardo Antonio Olivieri, Italian painter (d. 1752)
- c. February 23 – Samuel Bellamy, English pirate captain (d. 1717)
- February 27
  - Pietro Gnocchi, Italian composer (d. 1775)
  - John Roosevelt, American businessman and alderman (d. 1750)
  - Maximilian Emanuel of Württemberg-Winnental, German noble (d. 1709)
- March 3 – Thomas Ingoldsby, British politician (d. 1768)
- March 3 – Mattias Alexander von Ungern-Sternberg, Swedish politician and field marshal (d. 1763)
- March 7 – Charles-Michel Mesaiger, Jesuit priest (d. 1766)
- March 11
  - Roger Handasyd, British Army officer (d. 1763)
  - Nanbu Toshimoto, mid-Edo period Japanese samurai, the 6th daimyō of Morioka Domain (d. 1725)
- March 19 – Pierre-Joseph Alary, French ecclesiastic and writer (d. 1770)
- March 20 – Thomas Robie, Colonial American scientist and physician (d. 1729)
- March 25 – Peder Hersleb, Norwegian bishop (d. 1757)
- March 26 – Archduchess Maria Magdalena of Austria, Austrian Royal (d. 1743)
- April 2 – Arthur Dobbs, Irish politician, governor of the Province of North Carolina (d. 1765)
- April 5 – William Holmes, English academic and Dean of Exeter (d. 1748)
- April 14 – William Murray, Marquess of Tullibardine, Scottish army officer and Jacobite leader (d. 1746)
- April 15 – Richard Ward, American colonial governor (d. 1763)
- April 18 – Marie Anne de Bourbon, French noble (d. 1720)
- April 21 – Johann Jakob Fried, German obstetrician (d. 1769)
- April 24 – Giovanni Antonio Faldoni, Italian painter and engraver (d. 1770)
- April 30 – Jean-Jacques Amelot de Chaillou, French politician (d. 1749)
- May 1 – Martha Fowke, English poet (d. 1736)
- May 2 – Franz de Paula Ferg, Austrian painter (d. 1740)
- May 5 – John Tufts, American minister and music educator (d. 1750)
- May 10 – José Manso de Velasco, 1st Count of Superunda, Royal Governor of Chile (d. 1767)
- May 11 – Heinrich Karl Ludwig de Herault, Prussian Army general (d. 1757)
- May 15 – Lady Mary Wortley Montagu, writer and poet from England (d. 1762)
- May 16 – Samuel Adams Sr., American brewer (d. 1748)
- May 21 – André-François Deslandes, French philosopher (d. 1757)
- May 24 – Daniel Finch, 8th Earl of Winchilsea, British politician (d. 1769)
- May 27 – Andreas Jakob von Dietrichstein, Archbishop of Salzburg (d. 1753)
- May 28 – Maximilian of Hesse-Kassel, German prince (d. 1753)
- May 29 – Louis de Gramont, 6th Duke of Gramont, French general (d. 1745)
- June 1 – Henri François, comte de Ségur, French general (d. 1751)
- June 2 – Edward Harley, 2nd Earl of Oxford and Earl Mortimer, British politician, bibliophile, collector and patron of the arts (d. 1741)
- June 6 – Algernon Coote, 6th Earl of Mountrath, Irish politician (d. 1744)
- June 7 – Antoine Louis Rouillé, French noble (d. 1761)
- June 12 – Sir Richard Grosvenor, 4th Baronet, British politician; (d. 1732)
- June 19 – Montague Blundell, 1st Viscount Blundell, Irish Viscount (d. 1756)
- June 23 – George Hay, 8th Earl of Kinnoull, British diplomat (d. 1758)
- June 24 – Giovanni Casini, Portrait painter and sculptor (d. 1748)
- June 26
  - Edward Holyoke, American academic administrator, 9th president of Harvard (d. 1769)
  - James Radclyffe, 3rd Earl of Derwentwater, English noble (d. 1716)
- July 6 – Johann Friedrich Karl von Ostein, Roman Catholic archbishop (d. 1763)
- July 9 – Alexis Piron, French writer (d. 1773)
- July 14 – Antoine Gaubil, French missionary (d. 1759)
- July 15 – Mary Montagu, Duchess of Montagu (d. 1751)
- July 16 – Samuel Molyneux, Irish politician (d. 1728)
- July 17 – Christian, Landgrave of Hesse-Wanfried-Rheinfels (d. 1755)
- July 21 – John Quincy, American soldier and politician (d. 1767)
- July 22 – Szymon Czechowicz, Polish artist (d. 1775)
- July 24 – Prince William, Duke of Gloucester, son of Queen Anne (d. 1700)
- July 26 – Maria Anna Josepha Althann, Spanish noble (d. 1755)
- August 1 – Pedro de Calatayud, writer (d. 1773)
- August 3 – Ladislas Ignace de Bercheny, Marshal of France (d. 1778)
- August 4 – James Cotter the Younger, Leader of the Catholics of Cork (d. 1720)
- August 7 – Henric Benzelius, Swedish archbishop (d. 1758)
- August 8 – Wenzel Lorenz Reiner, Czech painter (d. 1743)
- August 19 – Samuel Richardson, English writer and printer (d. 1761)
- August 21 – Josep Prades i Gallent, Organist and composer (d. 1757)
- September 1
  - Kilian Ignaz Dientzenhofer, Czech architect (d. 1751)
  - Philipp Segesser, Swiss missionary (d. 1762)
- September 4
  - Hugh Bethell, British Member of Parliament (d. 1747)
  - Thomas Lawrence, American mayor (d. 1754)
  - Anna Sophie Schack, Danish noblewoman (d. 1760)
- September 13 – Johan Fredrik Peringskiöld, Swedish translator (d. 1725)
- September 17 – Ferdinand Charles, comte d'Aspremont-Lynden, army general (d. 1772)
- September 18 – Gabriel Malagrida, Italian missionary (d. 1761)
- September 21 – Jan Klemens Branicki, Polish noble (d. 1771)
- September 22 – Catharina Backer, painter from the Northern Netherlands (d. 1766)
- September 23 – Antonio Denzio, Italian opera singer (d. 1763)
- September 24 – Johann Adam Steinmetz, German pastor (d. 1762)
- September 26 – Nijō Yoshitada, Japanese noble (d. 1737)
- September 27 – Edward Stanley, 11th Earl of Derby, English noble and politician (d. 1776)
- September 29 – Henry Perrot, British Member of Parliament (d. 1740)
- September 30 – Jacques Aubert, French composer and violinist (d. 1753)
- October 10 – Francesco Maria Pratilli, Italian priest, antiquarian, famed for skilled forgeries (d. 1763)
- October 15 – Nicolas-Ignace de Beaubois, French missionary (d. 1770)
- October 22
  - King John V of Portugal, Portuguese king (d. 1750)
  - Matthew Skinner, English serjeant-at-law, judge and politician (d. 1749)
- October 29 – Tokugawa Yoshimichi, daimyo (d. 1713)
- October 31 – Mildmay Fane, British politician (d. 1715)
- November 2
  - Michael Cox, Anglican archbishop in Ireland (d. 1779)
  - Charles-François Panard, French chansonnier and poet (d. 1765)
  - Joan Paul Schaghen, Dutch governor (d. 1746)
- November 3
  - Jan Josef Ignác Brentner, Czech composer (d. 1742)
  - John Crowley, British Member of Parliament (d. 1728)
- November 4 – Luís Carlos Inácio Xavier de Meneses, 1st Marquis of Louriçal, Portuguese nobleman and statesman (d. 1742)
- November 6
  - Reynolds Calthorpe, politician (d. 1714)
  - Christoph Schütz, German theologian (d. 1750)
- November 8 – Henry XXXV, Prince of Schwarzburg-Sondershausen (d. 1758)
- November 17 – Jean François Foppens, Flemish historian (d. 1761)
- November 21 – Jacques I, Prince of Monaco, Prince consort of Monaco (d. 1751)
- November 29 – Johann Theodor Eller, German chemist and physician (d. 1760)
- November 30
  - Lars Gathenhielm, Swedish privateer (d. 1718)
  - Joseph Wamps, French painter (d. 1744)
- December 1 – Hieronymus Albrecht Hass, harpsichord maker (d. 1752)
- December 4 – Gottfried Lengnich, historian and politician (d. 1774)
- December 8 – Albert Wolfgang of Brandenburg-Bayreuth, Titular margrave of Brandenburg, imperial general (d. 1734)
- December 11 – Ignatius van der Beken, Flemish painter (d. 1774)
- December 14 – Agostino Veracini, Italian painter (d. 1762)
- December 21 – Arthur Ingram, 6th Viscount of Irvine, British peer and politician (d. 1736)
- December 23 – Joseph Bodin de Boismortier, French composer (d. 1755)
- December 24 – Frans van Mieris the Younger, Dutch painter (d. 1763)
- December 27 – Jacob August Franckenstein, Encyclopedia editor, professor (d. 1733)

== Deaths ==
1680

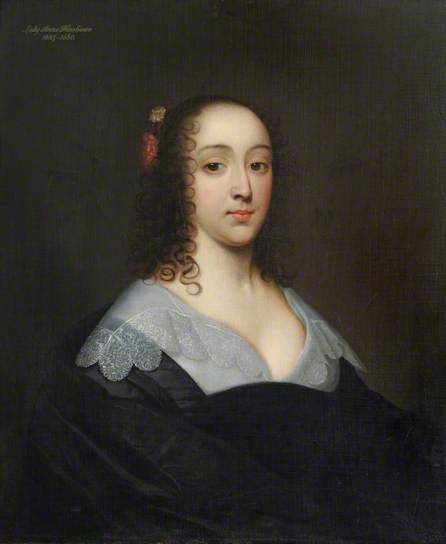
Ann, Lady Fanshawe

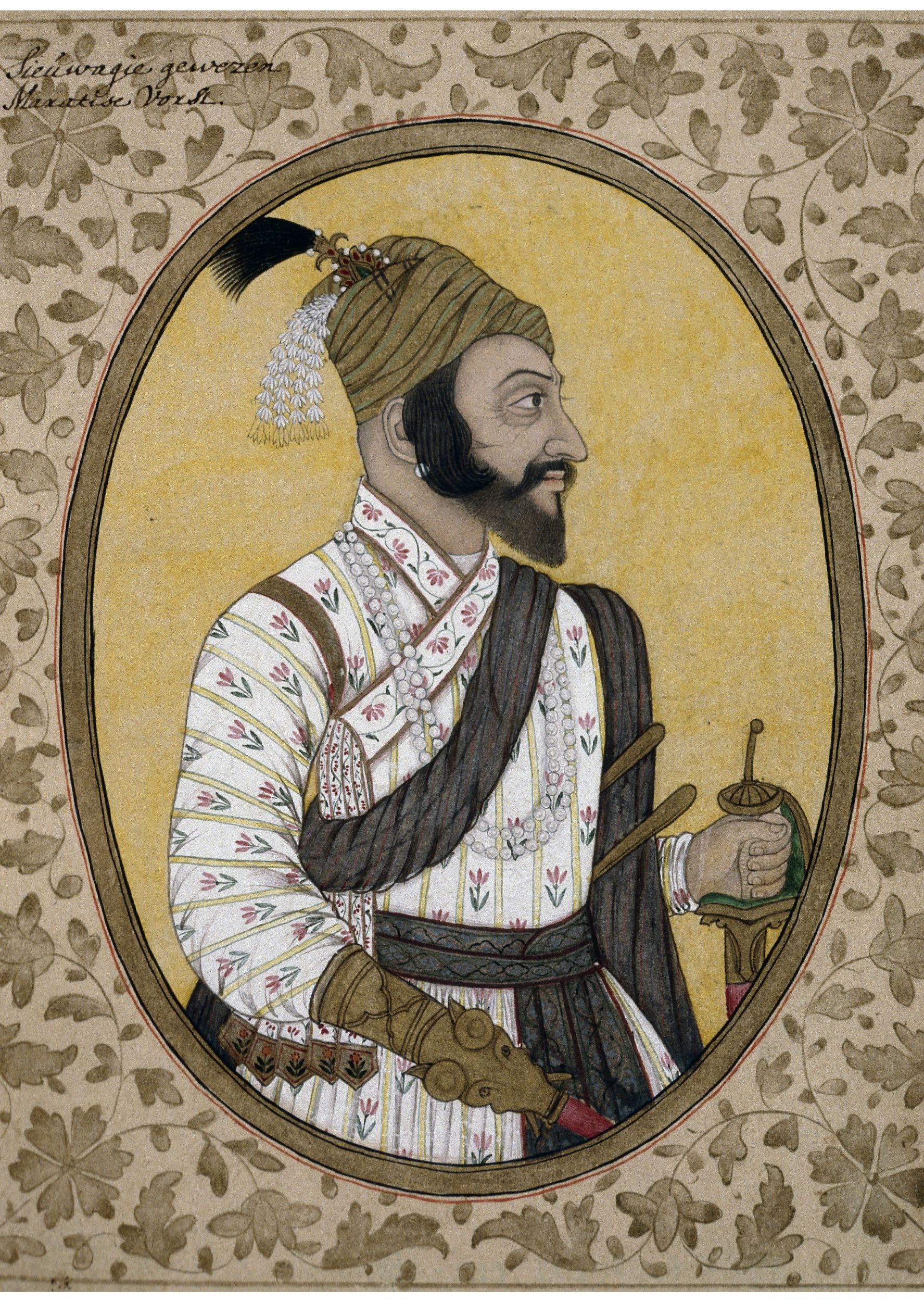
Shivaji

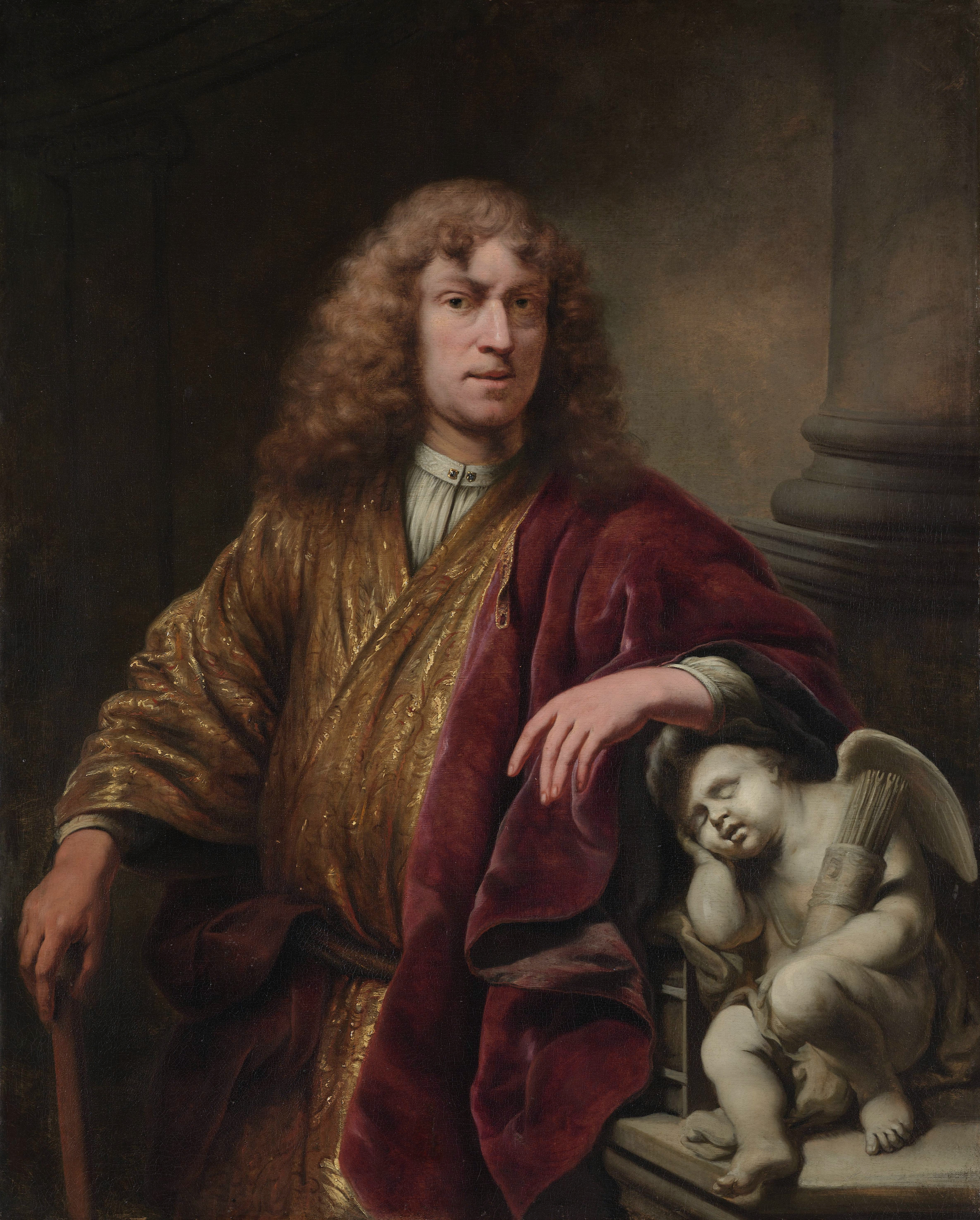
Ferdinand Bol

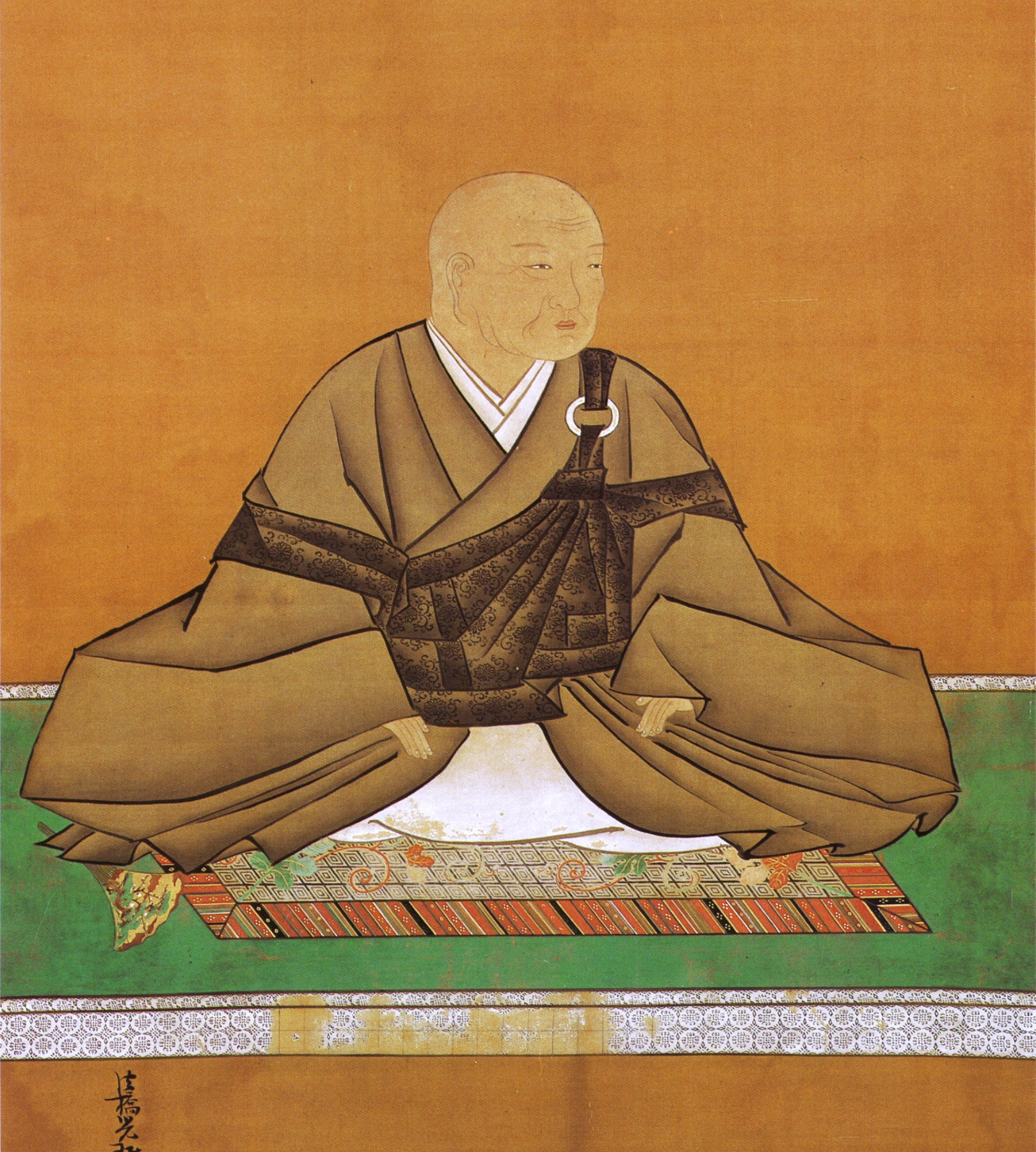
Emperor Go-Mizunoo

- January 2
  - John Jolliffe, English politician and businessman (b. 1613)
  - Trunajaya, Maduran prince and rebel leader, murdered (b. 1649)
- January 18 – John Hervey, English courtier and politician (b. 1616)
- January 20 – Ann, Lady Fanshawe, English memoirist (b. 1625)
- January 23 – Capel Luckyn, English Member of Parliament (b. 1622)
- February – Ralph Davenant, English rector and founder of Davenant Foundation School
- February 11 – Elisabeth of the Palatinate, German princess, philosopher and Calvinist (b. 1618)
- February 17
  - Denzil Holles, 1st Baron Holles, English statesman and writer (b. 1599)
  - Frans Post, Dutch painter (b. 1612)
  - Jan Swammerdam, Dutch scientist (b. 1637)
- February 22 – Catherine Monvoisin, French fortune teller and poisoner (b. c. 1640)
- February 27 – Philippe Balthazar de Gand, French noble (b. 1616)
- March 14 – René Le Bossu, French critic (b. 1631)
- March 17
  - William Brereton, 3rd Baron Brereton, English politician (b. 1631)
  - François de La Rochefoucauld, French writer (b. 1613)
- March 23 – Nicolas Fouquet, French statesman (b. 1615)
- April 1 – David Denicke, German jurist and hymnwriter (b. 1603)
- April 3 – Chhatrapati Shivaji Bhosale, founder of the Maratha Empire (b. 1630)
- April 19 – Marie Hedwig of Hesse-Darmstadt, Duchess consort of Saxe-Meiningen (1671–1680) (b. 1647)
- April 25
  - Louise of Anhalt-Dessau, Duchess suo jure of Oława and Wołów (1672–1680) (b. 1631)
  - Simon Paulli, Danish physician (b. 1603)
- April 29 – Nicolas Cotoner, Spanish 61st Grandmaster of the Knights Hospitaller (b. 1608)
- May 29 – Abraham Megerle, Austrian composer and organist (b. 1607)
- May 31 – Joachim Neander, German Calvinist clergyman (b. 1650)
- June 4
  - Augustus, Duke of Saxe-Weissenfels, administrator of the archbishopric of Magdeburg (b. 1614)
  - Tokugawa Ietsuna, Japanese Tokugawa shōgun (b. 1641)
- June 18 – Samuel Butler, English poet (b. 1612)
- June 10
  - Johan Göransson Gyllenstierna, Swedish statesman (b. 1635)
  - Louis Moréri, French encyclopedist (b. 1643)
- July 26
  - John Wilmot, 2nd Earl of Rochester, English poet (b. 1647)
  - Sir Hugh Smith, 1st Baronet, English Member of Parliament (b. 1632)
- July 30 – Thomas Butler, 6th Earl of Ossory (b. 1634)
- August 19 – John Eudes, French missionary (b. 1601)
- August 20 – William Bedloe, English informer (b. 1650)
- August 22 – John George II, Elector of Saxony (b. 1613)
- August 24
  - Ferdinand Bol, Dutch painter, etcher and draftsman (b. 1616)
  - Thomas Blood, thief of the English Crown Jewels (b. 1618)
- August 25 – Symeon of Polotsk, Belarusian churchman and poet (b. 1629)
- August 27 – Joan Cererols, Catalan musician and Benedictine monk (b. 1618)
- August 28 – Charles I Louis, Elector Palatine (b. 1617)
- September 1 – Anna Sophia I, Abbess of Quedlinburg, Dutch abbess (b. 1619)
- September 2 – Per Brahe the Younger, Swedish soldier and statesman (b. 1602)
- September 3
  - Anna Elisabeth of Anhalt-Bernburg, duchess consort of Württemberg-Bernstadt (b. 1647)
  - Paul Ragueneau, French Jesuit missionary (b. 1608)
- September 9 – Henry Marten, English regicide (b. 1602)
- September 10 – Baldassare Ferri, Italian castrato (b. 1610)
- September 11
  - Roger Crab, English Puritan political writer (b. 1621)
  - Emperor Go-Mizunoo of Japan (b. 1596)
- September 26 – John Dury, Scottish-born Calvinist minister (b. 1596)
- September 30 – Johann Grueber, Austrian Jesuit missionary and astronomer (b. 1623)
- October 4 – Pierre-Paul Riquet, French engineer and canal builder (b. 1609)
- October 13 – Lelio Colista, Italian composer and lutenist (b. 1629)
- October 16 – Raimondo Montecuccoli, Italian general (b. 1609)
- October 17 – Charles FitzCharles, 1st Earl of Plymouth, illegitimate son of King Charles II (b. 1657)
- October 30 – Antoinette Bourignon, Flemish mystic (b. 1616)
- November 9 – Hungerford Dunch, English politician (b. 1639)
- November 27 or November 28 – Athanasius Kircher, German Jesuit scholar (b. 1602)
- November 28
  - Gian Lorenzo Bernini, Italian sculptor (b. 1598)
  - Giovanni Francesco Grimaldi, Italian architect and painter (b. 1606)
- November 30 – Peter Lely, Dutch painter (b. 1618)
- December 4 – Thomas Bartholin, Danish physician, mathematician, and theologian (b. 1616)
- December 8 – Henry Pierrepont, 1st Marquess of Dorchester, English politician (b. 1606)
- December 10 – Marco Uccellini, Italian composer and violinist (b. 1603 or 1610)
- December 20 – Princess Elisabeth Sophie of Saxe-Altenburg, German princess (b. 1619)
- December 29
  - Arent Berntsen, Norwegian statistician (b. 1610)
  - William Howard, 1st Viscount Stafford of England (b. 1614)
- November 30 – Christopher Sandius, Dutch Arian writer (b. 1644)
- Zhou Youde, Chinese official
- Marie Meurdrac, French chemist and alchemist (b. 1610)

1681

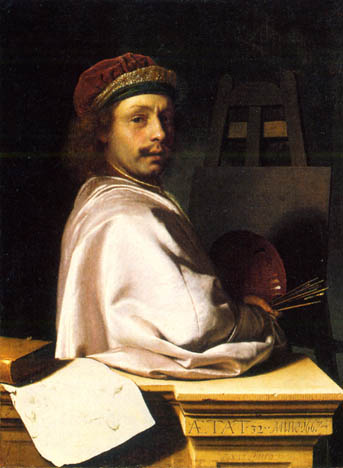
Frans van Mieris the Elder

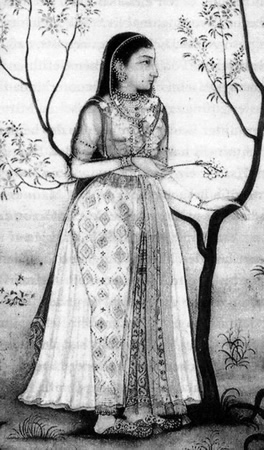
Jahanara Begum

- January 5 – Pietro Vidoni, Italian Catholic cardinal (b. 1610)
- January 7 – Magdalena Sibylla of Saxe-Weissenfels, German noblewoman (b. 1648)
- January 27 – Edmund Bowyer, English politician (b. 1613)
- January 28 – Richard Allestree, English royalist churchman (b. c. 1621)
- March 6 – Michel de Marolles, French translator and churchman (b. 1600)
- March 12 – Frans van Mieris the Elder, Dutch painter (b. 1635)
- March 17 – Zheng Jing, Chinese pirate (b. 1642)
- April 3 – Lucas Franchoys the Younger, Flemish painter (b. 1616)
- April 8 – Gabriel Druillettes, French missionary (b. 1610)
- April 10 – Philip I, Count of Schaumburg-Lippe (1640–1681) (b. 1601)
- April 11 – Frederick Louis, Count Palatine of Zweibrücken (b. 1619)
- April 12 – Pietro Paolini, Italian painter (b. 1603)
- April 22
  - Jeffrey Daniel, English politician (b. 1626)
  - Marie Fouquet, French medical writer and philanthropist (b. 1590)
- April 23 – Justus Sustermans, Flemish painter (b. 1597)
- April 26 – Charles Howard, 3rd Earl of Nottingham, son of Charles Howard (b. 1610)
- May 4 – Johannes Musaeus, German theologian (b. 1613)
- May 6 – Catherine Trianon, French fortune teller and poisoner (b. 1627)
- May 6 – Sir Philip Wodehouse, 3rd Baronet, English baronet (b. 1608)
- May 24 – Nicodemus Tessin the Elder, Swedish architect (b. 1615)
- May 25 – Pedro Calderón de la Barca, Spanish dramatist and poet (b. 1600)
- June 9 – William Lilly, English astrologer (b. 1602)
- June 12 – Sigmund von Birken, German Baroque poet (b. 1626)
- July 1 – Oliver Plunkett, Irish saint (b. 1629)
- July 8 – Georg Neumark, German poet and composer of hymns (b. 1621)
- July 10 – Christian Lupus, Flemish historian (b. 1612)
- July 20 – Louis Günther II, Count of Schwarzburg-Ebeleben (1642–1681) (b. 1621)
- July 25 – Urian Oakes, English-born president of Harvard University (b. 1631)
- July 31 – Sir Baynham Throckmorton, 3rd Baronet, English Member of Parliament (b. 1629)
- August 12 – Sir George Wharton, 1st Baronet, English baronet (b. 1617)
- August 17 – Patriarch Nikon of Moscow, Patriarch of the Russian Orthodox Church (b. 1605)
- August 18 – Thomas Allen, English politician (b. 1603)
- August 22 – Philippe Delano, Dutch Plymouth Colony settler (b. 1602)
- August 27 – William Christoph, Landgrave of Hesse-Homburg (b. 1625)
- September 11
  - Dirk van Bleiswijk, Dutch politician, writer (b. 1639)
  - Godfrey Henschen, Jesuit hagiographer (b. 1601)
- September 16 – Jahanara Begum, Mughal princess (b. 1614)
- September 27 – Jacob Masen, German poet (b. 1606)
- October 7 – Nicolaas Heinsius the Elder, Dutch scholar (b. 1620)
- October 15 – Johann Ludwig Schönleben, Carniolan priest (b. 1618)
- November 2 – Eleanor of Anhalt-Zerbst, duchess consort of Schleswig-Holstein-Sønderburg-Norburg (b. 1608)
- November 13 – Arnold Braemes, English politician (b. 1602)
- November 17 – Tito Livio Burattini, Italian inventor, Egyptologist and instrument-maker (b. 1617)
- November 23 – Hedwig of the Palatinate-Sulzbach, Archduchess of Austria, Duchess of Saxe-Lauenburg (b. 1650)
- November 26
  - Jean Garnier, French historian (b. 1612)
  - Giovanni Paolo Oliva, Italian Jesuit (b. 1600)
- December 4 – Maurice, Duke of Saxe-Zeitz (b. 1619)
- December 5 – Agatha Christine of Hanau-Lichtenberg, German noblewoman (b. 1632)
- December 8 – Gerard ter Borch, Dutch painter (b. 1617)
- December 12 – Hermann Conring, German philosopher (b. 1606)
- December 15 – James Compton, 3rd Earl of Northampton, English politician (b. 1622)
- December 16 – François Vavasseur, French writer (b. 1605)
- December 18 – Olimpia Aldobrandini, Italian Aldobrandini family member, heiress (b. 1623)
- December 21 – Lacuzon, Franche-Comté military leader (b. 1607)
- December 22 – Richard Alleine, English Puritan clergyman (b. 1611)
- c. December – John Pordage, Anglican vicar (b. 1607)
- date unknown – Fatima Soltan, sovereign queen of the Qasim Khanate

1682

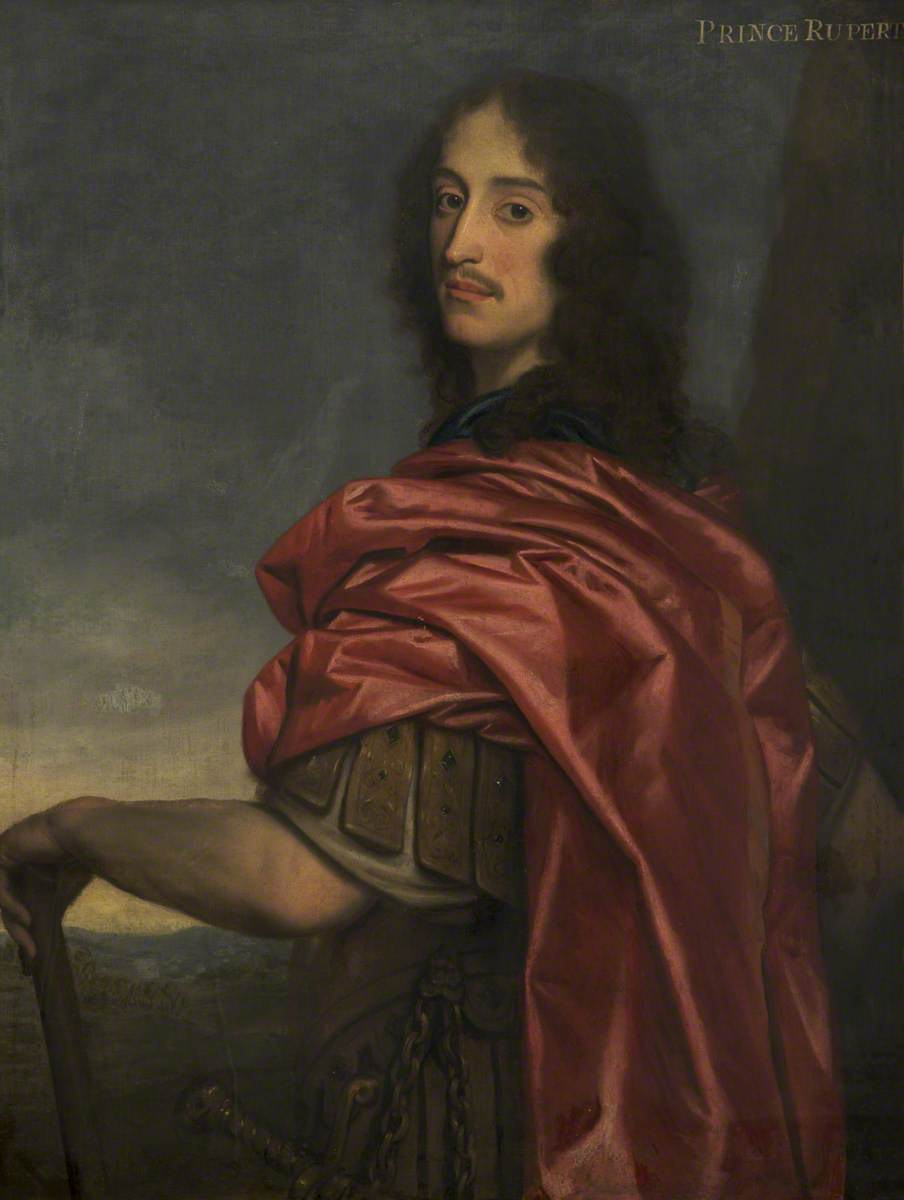
Prince Rupert of the Rhine

- January 1 – Jacob Kettler, German noble (b. 1610)
- January 3 – Olaus Verelius, scholar of Old Norse and Scandinavian studies (b. 1618)
- February 2 – Jean Le Pautre, French designer and engraver (b. 1618)
- February 10 – Sir William Hickman, 2nd Baronet, Member of the House of Commons of England (b. 1629)
- February 15
  - Claude de la Colombière, French Jesuit priest and saint (b. 1641)
  - Gu Yanwu, Chinese philologist and geographer (b. 1613)
- February 18 – Pierre Dupuis, French painter (b. 1610)
- February 19 – Frederick of Hesse-Darmstadt, German Catholic cardinal (b. 1616)
- February 25
  - Robert Packer, English politician (b. 1614)
  - Alessandro Stradella, Italian composer (b. 1639)
- March 13 – Dorothea Augusta of Schleswig-Holstein-Gottorp, German duchess (b. 1602)
- March 14 – Jacob Isaakszoon van Ruisdael, Dutch painter (b. c. 1628)
- March 24 – Frederick, Duke of Württemberg-Neuenstadt, German duke (b. 1615)
- March 31 – John Frescheville, 1st Baron Frescheville, English politician (b. 1607)
- April 1 – Franz Egon of Fürstenberg, German politician and Archbishop of Strasbourg (b. 1625)
- April 3 – Bartolomé Esteban Murillo, Spanish painter (b. 1618)
- April 6 – Johann von Hoverbeck, Prussian diplomat (b. 1606)
- April 8 – François Perrochel, French cleric (b. 1602)
- April 27 – Hŏ Mok, Korean politician, poet and scholar (b. 1595)
- May 7 – Tsar Feodor III of Russia (b. 1661)
- May 28 – Henri, Duke of Verneuil, French bishop (b. 1601)
- July 12 – Jean Picard, French astronomer (b. 1620)
- July 19 – Yohannes I, Emperor of Ethiopia (b. c. 1640)
- August 12 – Jean-Louis Raduit de Souches, German Imperial field marshal (b. 1608)
- August 24
  - John Maitland, 1st Duke of Lauderdale (b. 1616)
  - Marie Charlotte de la Trémoille, French noble (b. 1632)
- August 26 – William Wirich, Count of Daun-Falkenstein, German nobleman (b. 1613)
- September 8 – Juan Caramuel y Lobkowitz, Spanish writer (b. 1606)
- September 16 – Yamazaki Ansai, Japanese philosopher (b. 1619)
- October 19 – Sir Thomas Browne, English author, physician and philosopher (b. 1605)
- October 20 – António das Chagas, Portuguese Franciscan friar and ascetical writer (b. 1631)
- November 2 – Francis Browne, 3rd Viscount Montagu in the Peerage of England (b. 1610)
- November 4 – Dirck Rembrantsz van Nierop, Dutch astronomer and cartographer (b. 1610)
- November 14 – Rijcklof van Goens, Dutch colonial governor (b. 1619)
- November 23 – Claude Lorrain, Lorraine-born landscape painter (b. c. 1600)
- November 28 – Valentine Greatrakes, Irish faith healer (b. 1628)
- November 29 – Prince Rupert of the Rhine, German soldier, Royalist commander in the English Civil War (b. 1619)
- December 18
  - Heneage Finch, 1st Earl of Nottingham, English politician (b. 1621)
  - Guðríður Símonardóttir, Icelandic woman victim of the Turkish Abductions (b. 1598)

date unknown

- Phillip Calvert, Colonial governor of Maryland (b. c. 1626)
- Mariam Dadiani, Queen Dowager of Kartli (b. 1599/1609)
- The Great 5th Dalai Lama of Tibet (b. 1617)

1683

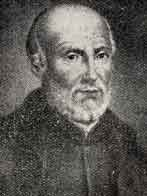
Julien Maunoir

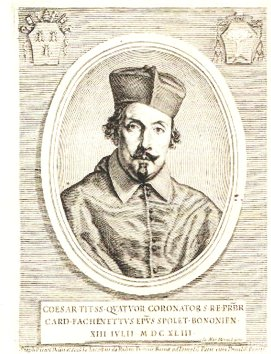
Cesare Facchinetti

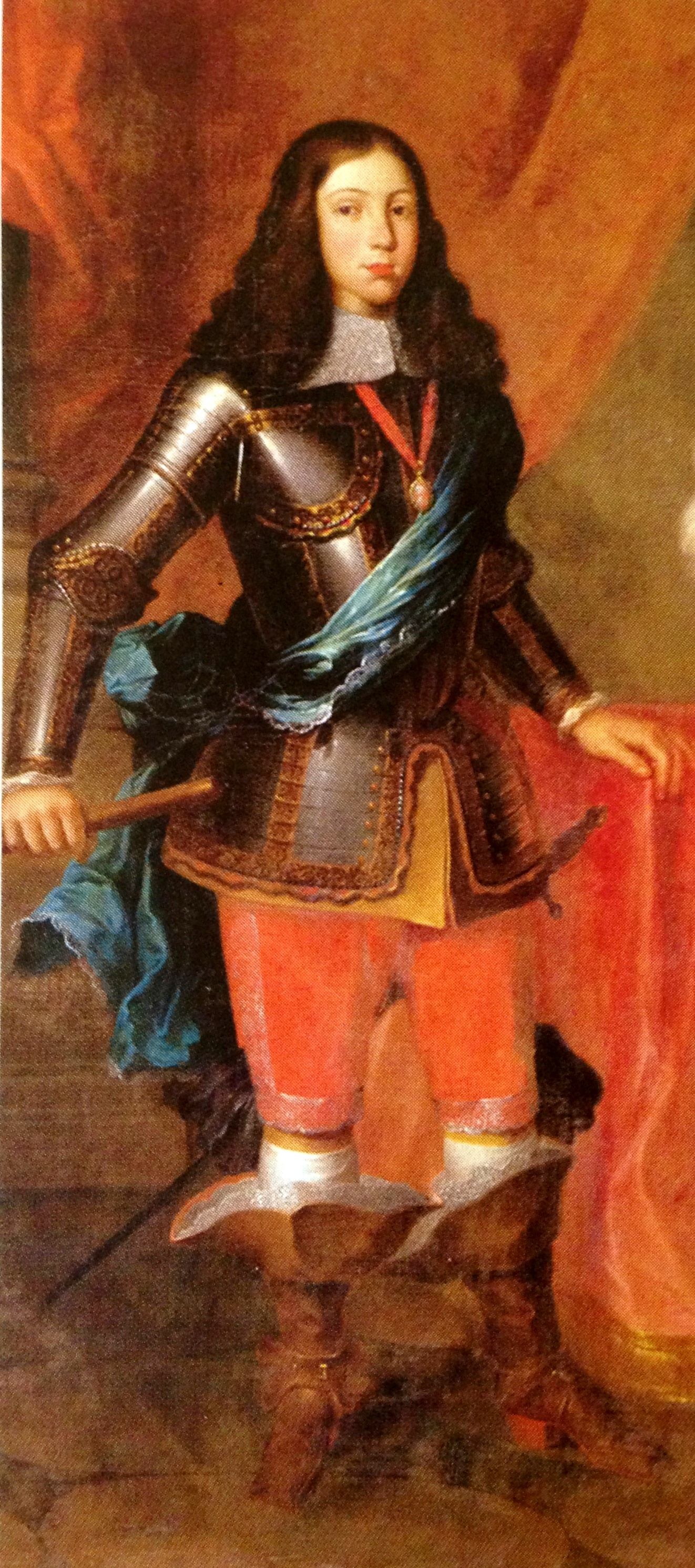
Afonso VI of Portugal

- January 2 – Sir Thomas Twisden, 1st Baronet, English politician (b. 1602)
- January 14 – Edward Thurland, English politician (b. 1607)
- January 15 – Philip Warwick, English writer and politician (b. 1609)
- January 21 – Anthony Ashley Cooper, 1st Earl of Shaftesbury, British politician (b. 1621)
- January 28 – Julian Maunoir, French Jesuit priest (b. 1606)
- January 30 – Cesare Facchinetti, Italian Roman Catholic cardinal (b. 1608)
- February 18 – Nicolaes Pieterszoon Berchem, Dutch painter (b. 1620)
- February 27 – Engel de Ruyter, Dutch admiral (b. 1649)
- February 28 – Johann Paul Freiherr von Hocher, Austrian chancellor (b. 1616)
- March 6 – Guarino Guarini, Italian architect of the Piedmontese Baroque (b. 1624)
- March 8 – Robert Paston, 1st Earl of Yarmouth, English politician, earl (b. 1631)
- March 11 – Giovanni Bernardo Carboni, Italian painter (b. 1614)
- March 14 – Robert Montagu, 3rd Earl of Manchester, English politician (b. 1634)
- March 16 – Henrik Bjelke, Norwegian military officer (b. 1615)
- March 19 – Thomas Killigrew, English dramatist (b. 1612)
- April 28 – Daniel Casper von Lohenstein, German writer, diplomat and lawyer (b. 1635)
- March 29 – Yaoya Oshichi, young Japanese girl burned at the stake for arson (b. 1667)
- May 2 – Stjepan Gradić, Croatian philosopher and scientist (b. 1613)
- May 15 – John Ernest II, Duke of Saxe-Weimar (b. 1627)
- June 4 – Wolfgang George Frederick von Pfalz-Neuburg, German bishop (b. 1659)
- July 7 – Elisabeth Henriette of Hesse-Kassel, daughter of William VI (b. 1661)
- July 10 – François Eudes de Mézeray, French historian (b. 1610)
- July 13 – Arthur Capell, 1st Earl of Essex, English statesman (b. 1631)
- July 21 – William Russell, Lord Russell, English politician (b. 1639)
- July 26 – Jean Le Vacher, French Lazarist missionary and French consul (b. 1619)
- July 30 – Maria Theresa of Spain, French queen, married to Louis XIV of France (b. 1638)
- August 4 – Turhan Hatice Sultan, Ottoman Valide Sultan, married to Ibrahim and the mother of Sultan Mehmed IV (b. 1627)
- August 18 – Charles Hart, English actor (b. 1625)
- August 22 – Sir John Hobart, 3rd Baronet, English landowner and politician (b. 1628)
- August 24 – John Owen, English non-conformist theologian (b. 1616)
- September 6 – Jean-Baptiste Colbert, French minister of finance (b. 1619)
- September 12 – King Afonso VI of Portugal (b. 1643)
- September 17 – John Campanius, Swedish Lutheran minister in New Sweden (b. 1601)
- October 1 – John Hull, colonial American merchant and politician (b. 1624)
- October 8 – Philipp Friedrich Böddecker, German organist and composer (b. 1607)
- October 9 – Francesco Caetani, 8th Duke of Sermoneta, Governor of the Duchy of Milan (b. 1613)
- October 25 – William Scroggs, lord chief justice of England (b. c. 1623)
- November 10
  - John Collins, English mathematician (b. 1625)
  - Robert Morison, Scottish botanist and taxonomist (b. 1620)
- November 16 – Margareta Huitfeldt, Norwegian-Swedish noble (b. 1608)
- November 29 – John Wright, British politician (b. 1615)
- December 7
  - John Oldham, English poet (smallpox) (b. 1653)
  - Algernon Sidney, English politician (b. 1623)
- December 13 – Anna Sophia II, Abbess of Quedlinburg, Abbesses of Quedlinburg (b. 1638)
- December 15 – Izaak Walton, English writer (b. 1593)
- December 16 – John Knight, Member of the Parliament of England (b. 1613)
- December 25 – Samuel Clarke, English writer and priest (b. 1599)
- December 27 – Maria Francisca of Savoy, Queen consort of Portugal (b. 1646)
- Birgitta Durell, Swedish industrialist (b. 1616)
- Roger Williams, English theologian and colonist (b. 1603)

1684

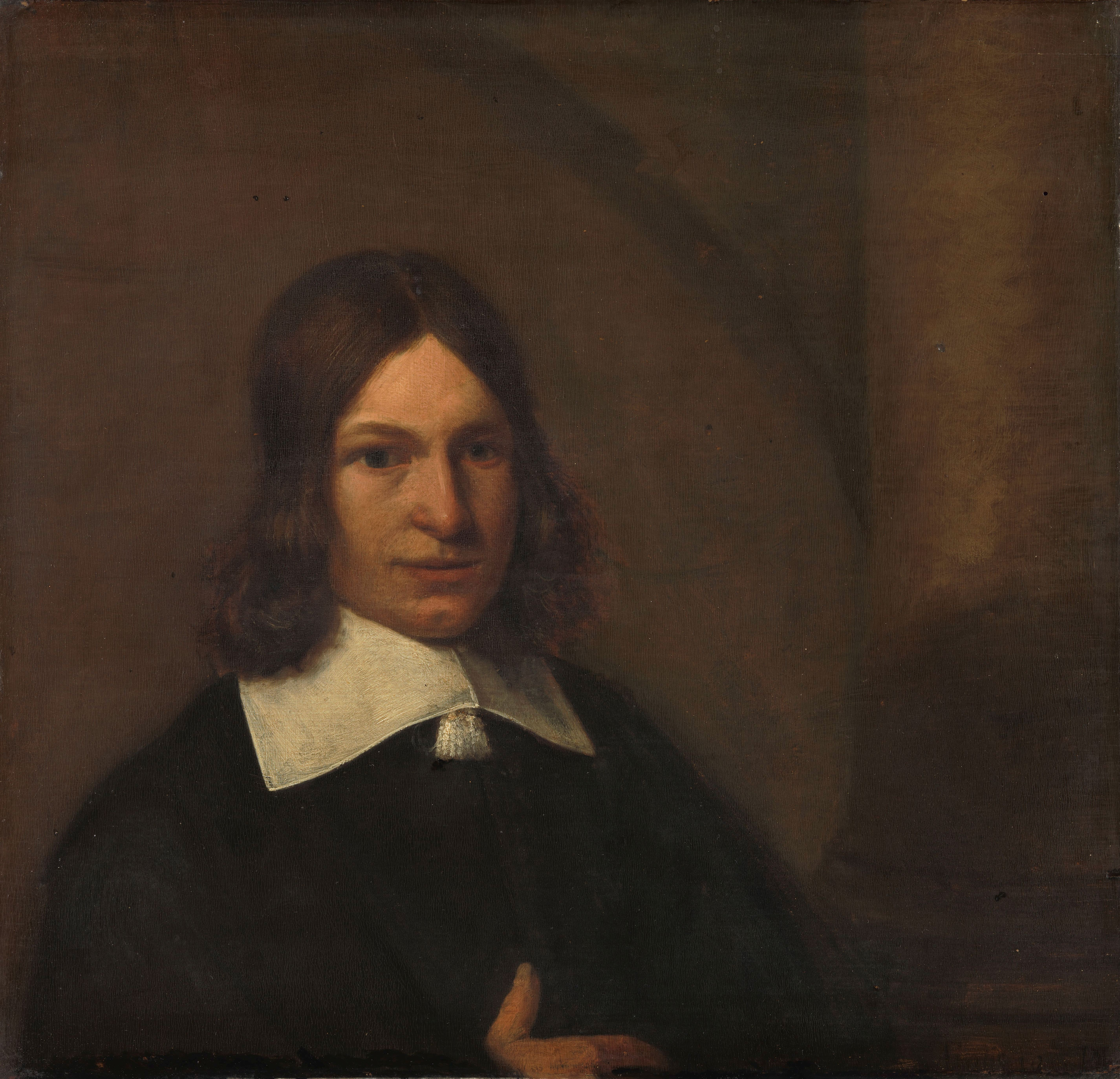
Pieter de Hooch

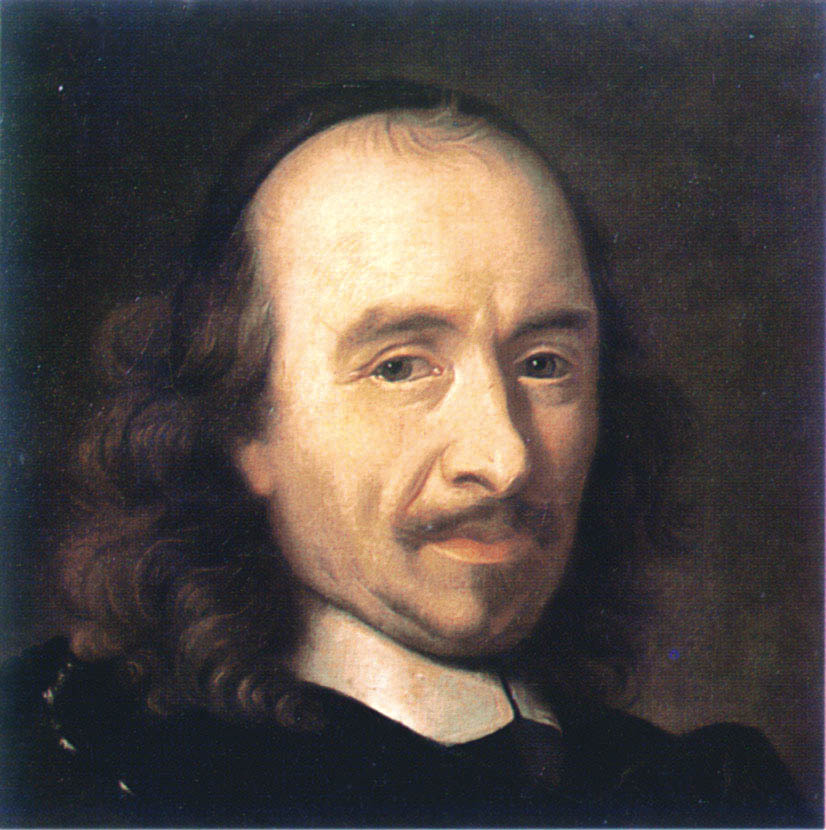
Pierre Corneille

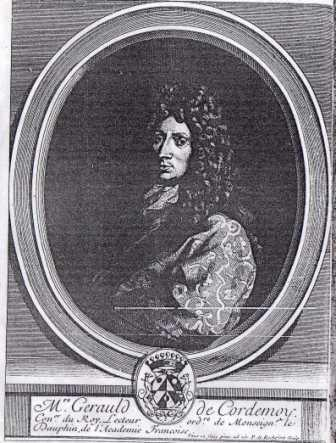
Géraud de Cordemoy

- January 4 – Louis-Isaac Lemaistre de Sacy, French Bible translator (b. 1613)
- January 11 – Cornelis Speelman, Governor-General of the Dutch East Indies (b. 1628)
- January 13 – Henry Howard, 6th Duke of Norfolk, English noble (b. 1628)
- January 15 – Alvise Contarini, Doge of Venice (b. 1601)
- January 21 – Queen Myeongseong, Korean royal consort (b. 1642)
- January 29 – Angélique de Saint-Jean Arnauld d'Andilly, French Jansenist nun (b. 1624)
- February 6 – Ernst Bogislaw von Croÿ, German Lutheran administrator (b. 1620)
- February 11 – Sir Thomas Peyton, 2nd Baronet, English politician (b. 1613)
- February 25 – Dorothy Spencer, Countess of Sunderland, English noblewoman (b. 1617)
- March 24
  - Pieter de Hooch, Dutch painter (b. 1629)
  - Elizabeth Ridgeway, English poisoner (burned at the stake)
- April 3 – Marc Restout, French painter (b. 1616)
- April 5
  - Lord William Brouncker, English mathematician (b. 1602)
  - Karl Eusebius, Prince of Liechtenstein (b. 1611)
- April 6 – Domenico Maria Canuti, Italian Baroque painter (b. 1625)
- April 12 – Nicola Amati, Cremonese violin-maker (b. 1596)
- April 13 – Nicolás Antonio, Spanish bibliographer (b. 1617)
- April 24 – Johann Olearius, German hymnwriter (b. 1611)
- May 4 – John Nevison, English highwayman (hanged) (b. 1639)
- May 10 – Anne Carr, Countess of Bedford, English noble (b. 1615)
- May 12 – Edme Mariotte, French physicist and priest (b. c. 1620)
- June 24 – Sir Edward Dering, 2nd Baronet, Irish politician (b. 1625)
- July 6 – Peter Gunning, English royalist churchman (b. 1614)
- July 12 – John Rogers, American President of Harvard University (b. 1630)
- July 26 – Elena Cornaro Piscopia, Venetian philosopher of noble descent (b. 1646)
- August 8 – George Booth, 1st Baron Delamer, English royalist politician, soldier and landowner (b. 1622)
- August 20 – Maria d'Este, Italian noble (b. 1644)
- September 9 – Jakob Thomasius, German philosopher (b. 1622)
- October 1 – Pierre Corneille, French playwright (b. 1606)
- October 11 – James Tuchet, 3rd Earl of Castlehaven, Anglo-Irish noble and soldier (b. c. 1617)
- October 12 – William Croone, English physician, an original Fellow of the Royal Society (b. 1633)
- October 15
  - Géraud de Cordemoy, French historian, philosopher and lawyer (b. 1626)
  - Julius Siegmund, Duke of Württemberg-Juliusburg, German noble (b. 1653)
- October 24 – Duchess Marie Elisabeth of Saxony (b. 1610)
- October 25 – Dud Dudley, English ironmaster (b. 1600?)
- November 20
  - Bartolomé Garcia de Escañuela, Spanish Catholic prelate and bishop (b. 1627)
  - Cornelius Van Steenwyk, American politician (b. 1626)
- November 23 – William Cavendish, 3rd Earl of Devonshire, English noble (b. 1617)
- December 10 – Sir Thomas Sclater, 1st Baronet, English politician (b. 1615)
- December 22 – Francis Hawley, 1st Baron Hawley, English politician (b. 1608)
- date unknown – Alexandra Mavrokordatou, Greek intellectual, salonist (b. 1605)

1685

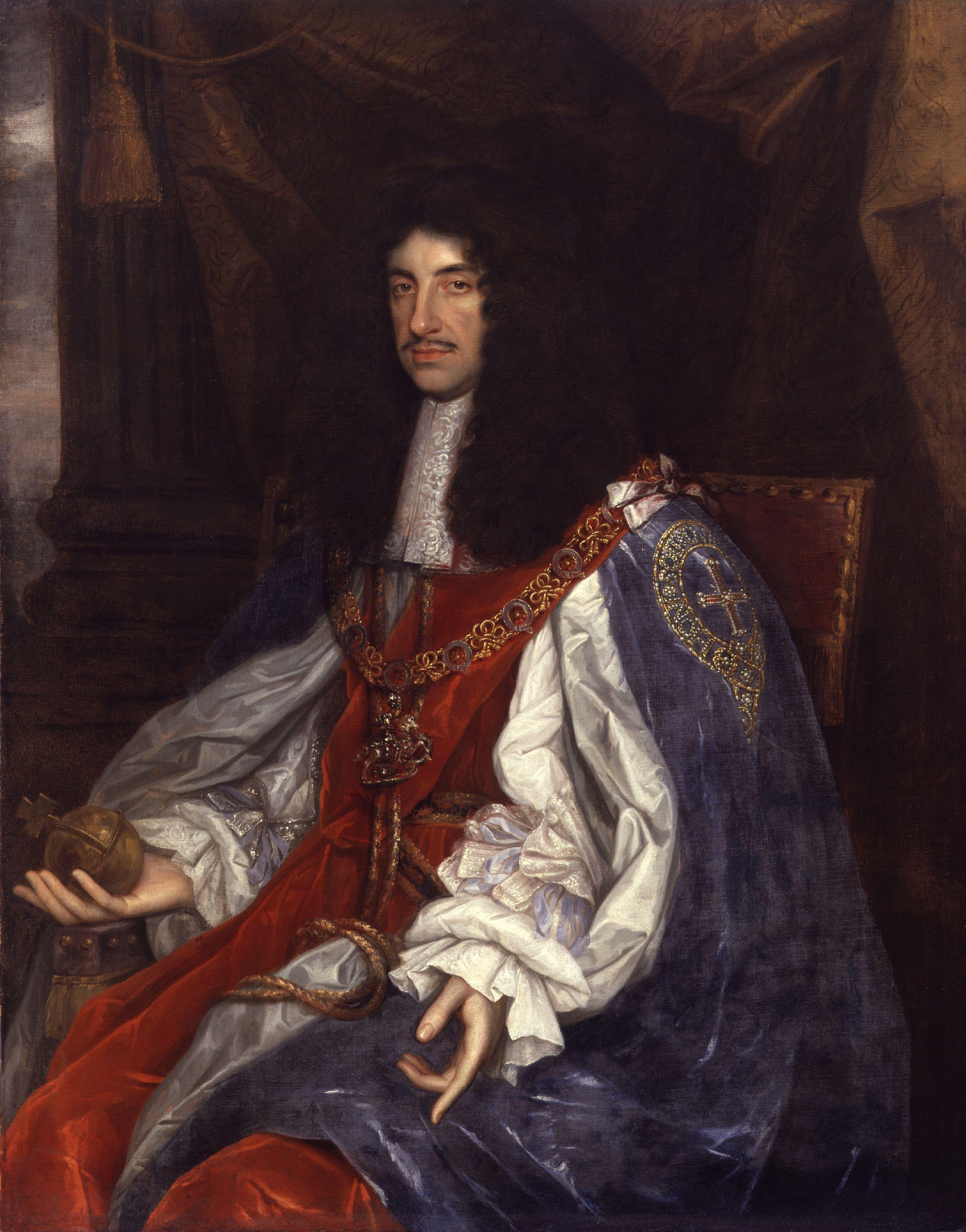
King Charles II of England

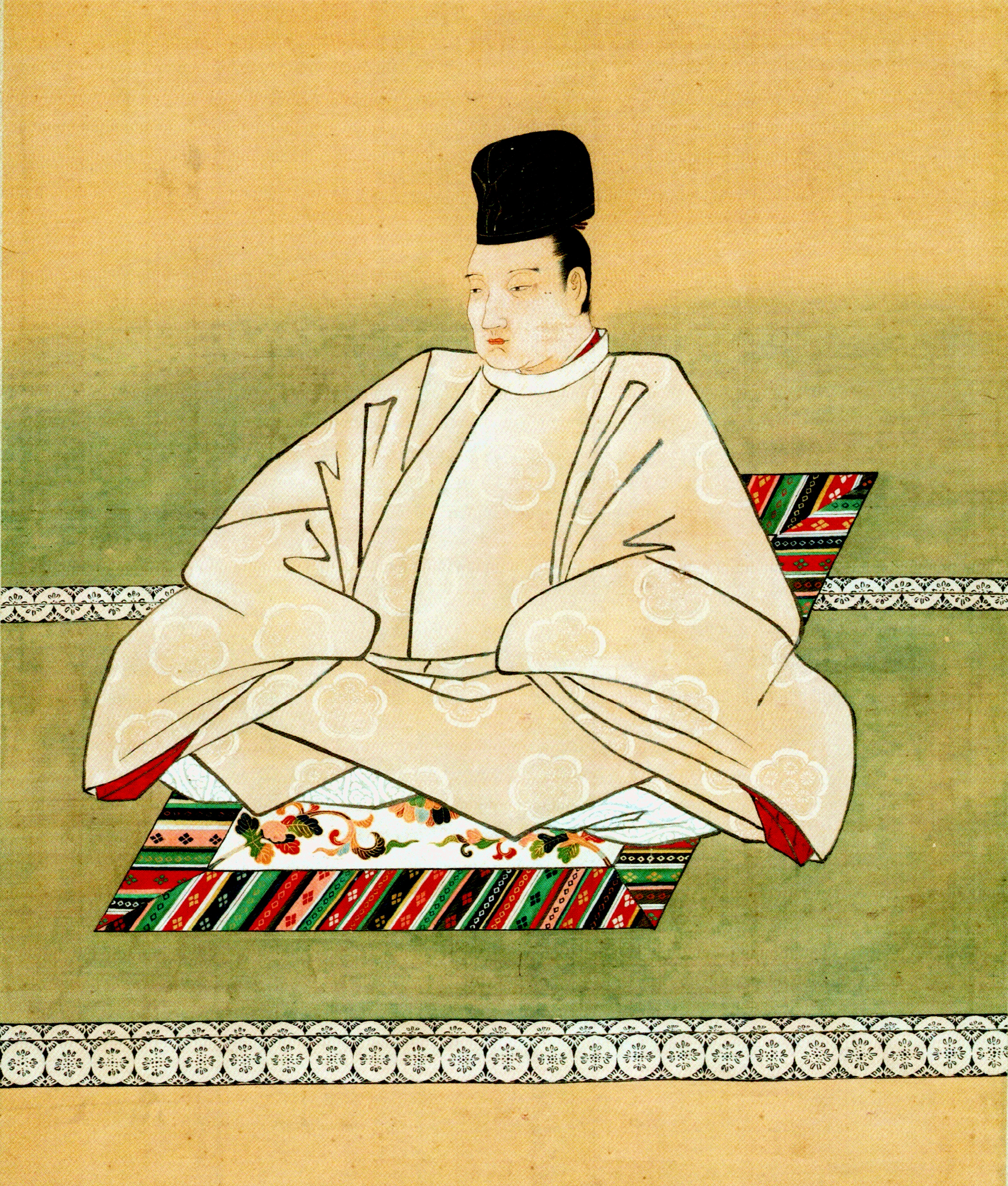
Emperor Go-Sai

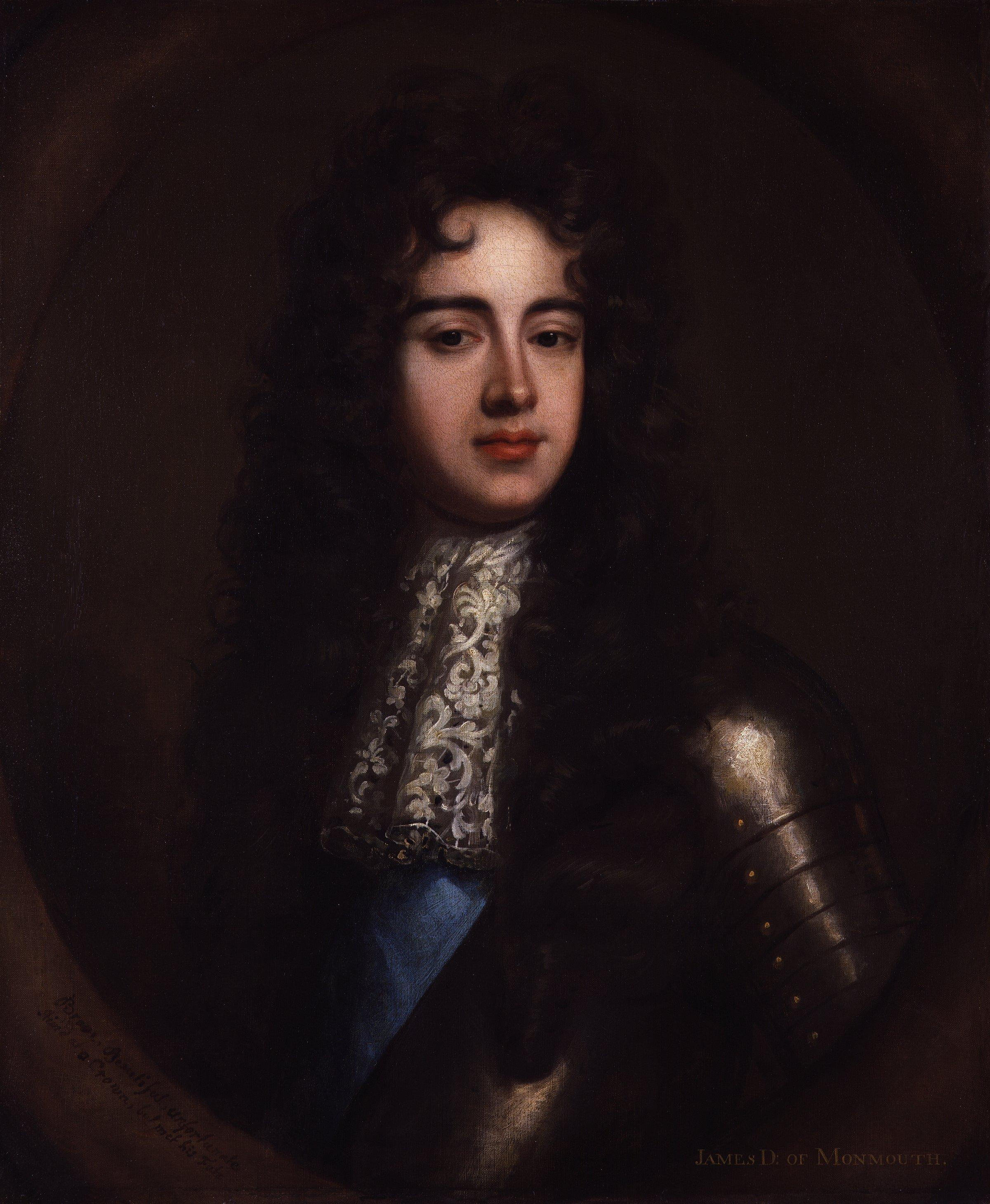
James Scott

- January 2 – Harbottle Grimston, English politician (b. 1603)
- January 13 – Daniello Bartoli, Italian Jesuit priest (b. 1608)
- February 6 – King Charles II of England, Scotland and Ireland (b. 1630)
- February 11 – David Teniers III, Flemish painter (b. 1638)
- February 20 – Sophie Amalie of Brunswick-Lüneburg, Danish queen (b. 1628)
- February 24
  - Archduchess Isabella Clara of Austria, Austrian archduchess (b. 1629)
  - Charles Howard, 1st Earl of Carlisle, English politician and military leader (b. 1629)
- March 6 – Sir Thomas Spencer, 3rd Baronet, English Member of Parliament (b. 1639)
- March 7 – Giles Hungerford, English politician (b. 1614)
- March 9 – Carpoforo Tencalla, Swiss-Italian Baroque painter of canvases and frescoes (b. 1623)
- March 11 – Klara Izabella Pacowa, politically active Polish court official (b. 1631)
- March 17 – Sir Richard Bulkeley, 1st Baronet, Irish politician (b. 1634)
- March 19 – René-François de Sluse, Walloon mathematician (b. 1622)
- March 22 – Emperor Go-Sai of Japan (b. 1638)
- March 25 – Nicolas Robert, French painter (b. 1614)
- March 30 – Friedrich Casimir, Count of Hanau-Lichtenberg (1641–1680) and Hanau-Münzenberg (1642–1680) (b. 1623)
- March 31 – Juan Hidalgo de Polanco, Spanish composer (b. 1614)
- April – Adriaen van Ostade, Dutch painter and engraver (b. 1610)
- April 5 – Samuel Sandys, English politician (b. 1615)
- April 14 – Thomas Otway, English dramatist (b. 1652)
- May 11 – Margaret Wilson (Scottish martyr) (b. c. 1667)
- May 25 – Sir John Marsham, 1st Baronet, English politician (b. 1602)
- May 26 – Karl II, Elector Palatine (b. 1651)
- June 10 – Henry Goring, English politician (b. 1646)
- June 16 – Anne Killigrew, English poet and painter (b. 1660)
- June 26 – John Evelyn, English politician (b. 1601)
- June 30 – Archibald Campbell, 9th Earl of Argyll, Scottish peer (b. 1629)
- July 6 – Nicholas Pedley, English politician (b. 1615)
- July 15 – James Scott, 1st Duke of Monmouth, illegitimate son of Charles II of England (beheaded) (b. 1649)
- July 28 – Henry Bennet, 1st Earl of Arlington, English statesman (b. 1618)
- August 8 – Giovanni Battista Salvi da Sassoferrato (b. 1609)
- September 1 – Leoline Jenkins, Welsh lawyer and diplomat (b. 1625)
- September 5 – Francis North, 1st Baron Guilford (b. 1637)
- September 9 – Richard Ingoldsby, English politician (b. 1617)
- September 17 – Arthur Spry, English politician (b. 1612)
- September 24 – Gustaf Otto Stenbock, Swedish soldier and politician (b. 1614)
- October 1 – Kanō Yasunobu, Japanese painter of the Kanō school of painting, during the Edo period (b. 1614)
- October 3
  - Juan Carreño de Miranda, Spanish artist (b. 1614)
  - Johann Heinrich Roos, Dutch painter (b. 1631)
- October 12
  - Christoph Ignaz Abele, Austrian jurist (b. 1628)
  - Gerard Brandt, Dutch historian (b. 1626)
- October 23 – Yamaga Sokō, Japanese philosopher (b. 1622)
- October 29 – Anne Wharton, English poet (b. 1659)
- October 30 – Michel Le Tellier, French statesman (b. 1603)
- November 4 – Girolamo Grimaldi-Cavalleroni, Italian Catholic cardinal (b. 1597)
- November 7 – Sir William Maynard, 1st Baronet, English politician (b. 1641)
- November 9 – Louis Armand I, Prince of Conti (b. 1661)
- November 18 – George Courthope, English politician (b. 1616)
- November 28
  - Maffeo Barberini, Prince of Palestrina (b. 1631)
  - Nicolas de Neufville de Villeroy, Marshal of France (b. 1598)
- December 12 – John Pell, English mathematician (b. 1610)
- date unknown – Nalan Xingde, Chinese poet who became a scholar and officer in the Imperial Bodyguard (b. 1655)

1686

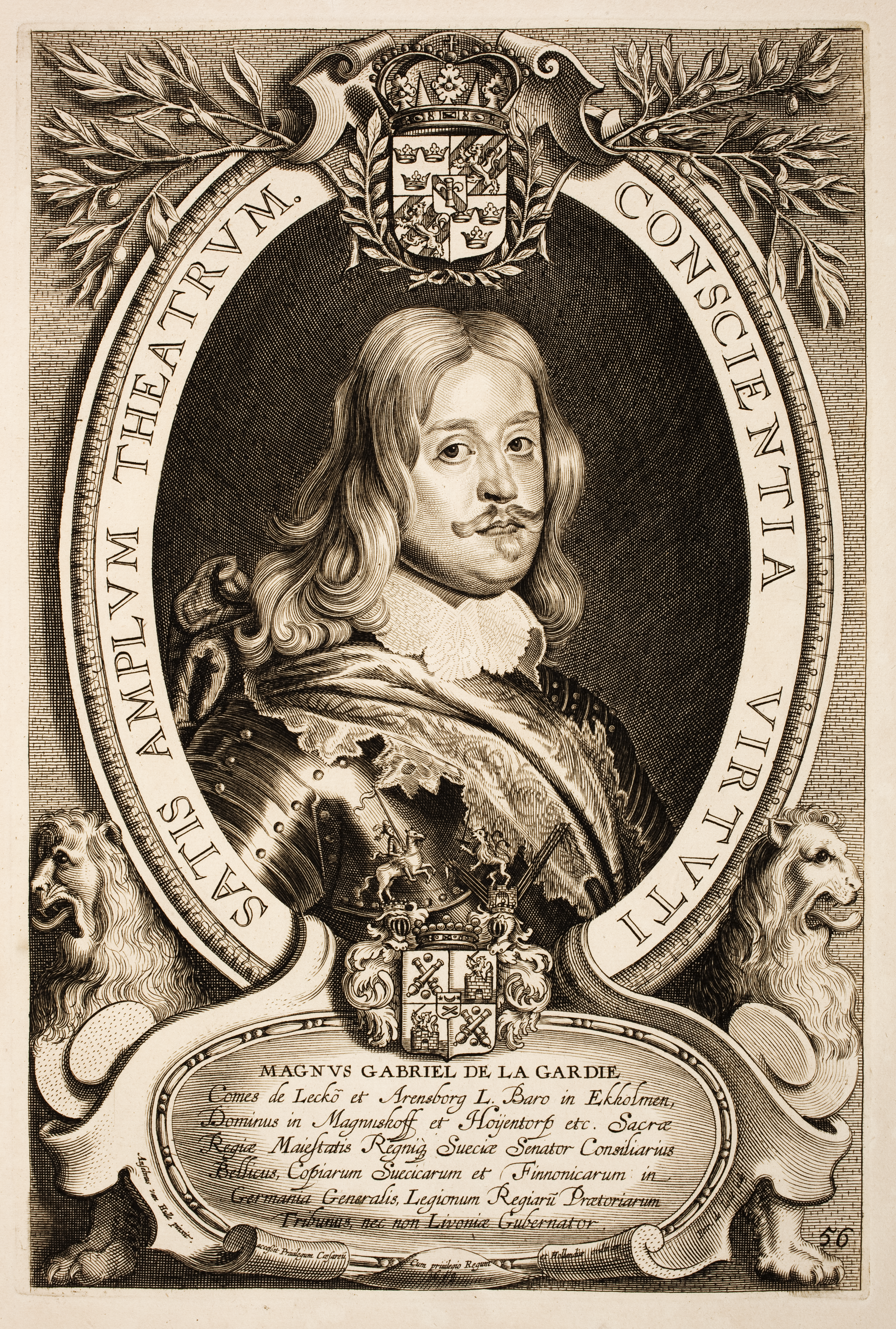
Magnus Gabriel De la Gardie

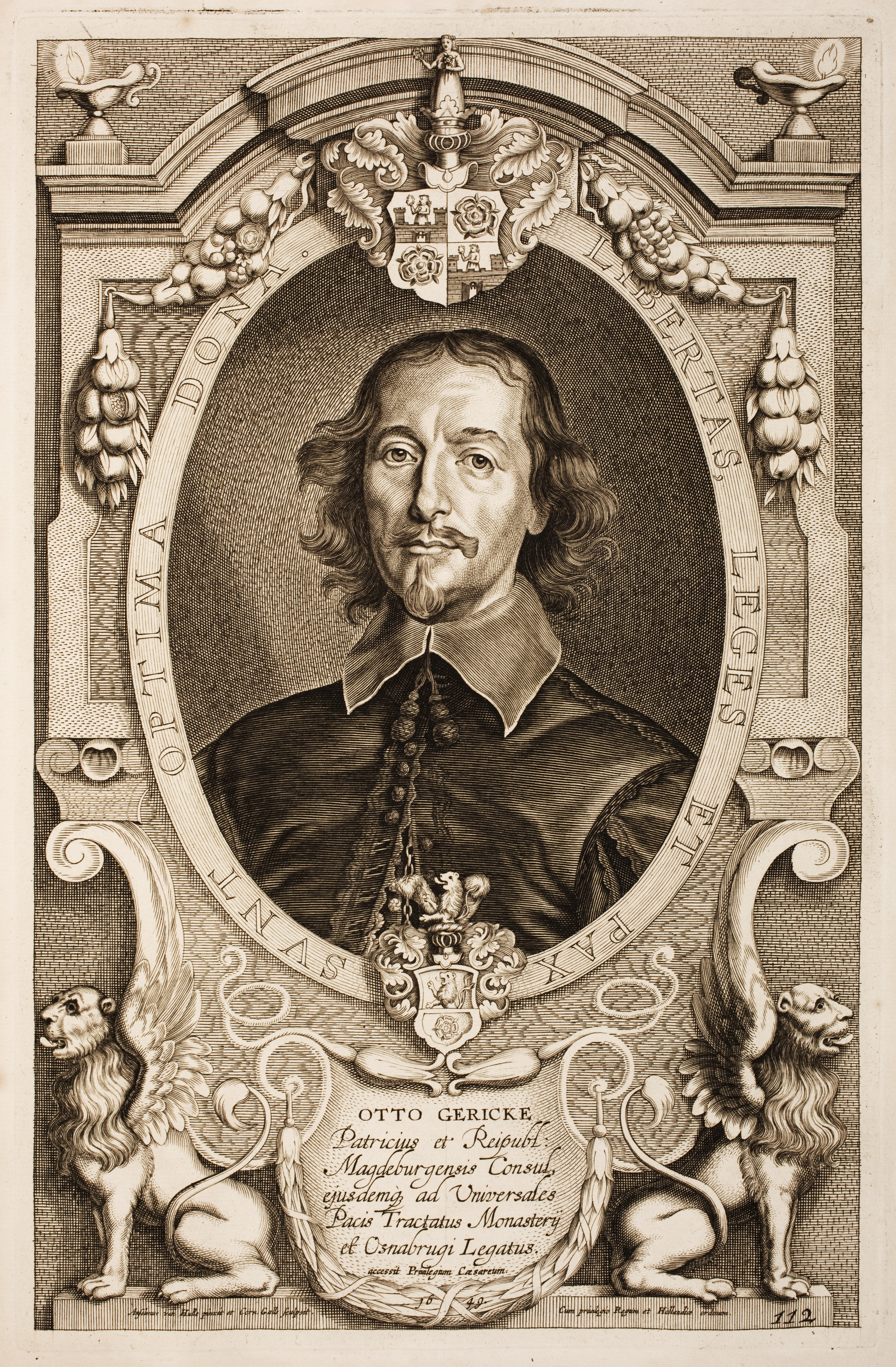
Otto von Guericke

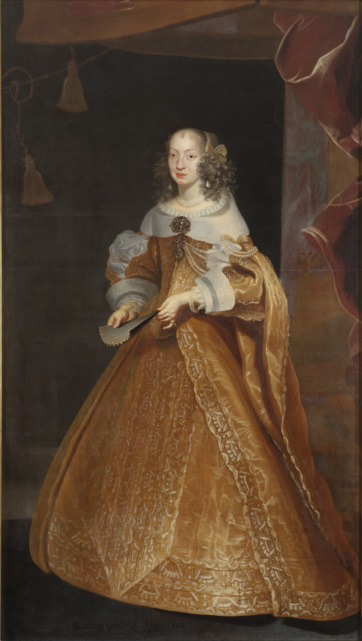
Eleonora Gonzaga

- January 10 – Ana de los Angeles Monteagudo, Peruvian nun (b. 1602)
- January 17 – Carlo Dolci, Italian painter (b. 1616)
- January 19 – Simon Digby, 4th Baron Digby, English politician (b. 1657)
- January 21 – François Blondel, French architect (b. 1618)
- January 22 – Duchess Johanna Magdalena of Saxe-Altenburg (b. 1656)
- January 31 – Jean Mairet, French dramatist (b. 1604)
- February 6 (dubious) – Dorothy White, English Quaker and writer (b. 1630)
- February 10 – William Dugdale, English antiquarian (b. 1605)
- February 21 – Sibylle Christine of Anhalt-Dessau, Princess of Anhalt-Dessau (b. 1603)
- March 17 – Elisabeth Marie, Duchess of Oels, Regent of Oels (b. 1625)
- March 22 – John Frederick, Margrave of Brandenburg-Ansbach (b. 1654)
- March 26 – Charlotte, Landgravine of Hesse-Kassel, German noble (b. 1627)
- April 6 – Arthur Annesley, 1st Earl of Anglesey, English royalist statesman (b. 1614)
- April 19 – Antonio de Solís y Ribadeneyra, Spanish writer (b. 1610)
- April 23 – Henrietta Wentworth, 6th Baroness Wentworth of England (b. 1660)
- April 26 – Magnus Gabriel De la Gardie, Swedish statesman and military man (b. 1622)
- May 11 – Otto von Guericke, German physicist and inventor of the Magdeburg Hemispheres (b. 1602)
- May 29 – Ove Juul, Governor-General of Norway (b. 1615)
- May 31 – Nicholas Barré, French Minim friar, priest and founder (b. 1621)
- June 23 – William Coventry, English statesman (b. c.1628)
- July 10 – John Fell, English churchman (b. 1625)
- July 16 – John Pearson, English theologian (b. 1612)
- August 3 – Anna Margaret of Hesse-Homburg, Duchess consort of Schleswig-Holstein-Sonderburg-Wiesenburg (b. 1629)
- August 13 – Louis Maimbourg, French-born historian (b. 1610)
- September 19 – John George I, Duke of Saxe-Eisenach, German duke (b. 1634)
- October 26 – John Egerton, 2nd Earl of Bridgewater, English politician (b. 1623)
- November 1 – William Duckett, English politician (b. 1624)
- November 25 – Nicolas Steno, Danish pioneer in anatomy and geology, bishop (b. 1638)
- November 28 – Nicolas Letourneux, French preacher, ascetical writer (b. 1640)
- December 6 – Eleonora Gonzaga, Queen consort of Ferdinand III, Holy Roman Emperor (b. 1630)
- December 11 – Louis, Grand Condé, French general (b. 1621)
- December 12 – Charles de Noyelle, French Jesuit Superior General (b. 1615)
- December 24 – Philip Packer, British barrister and architect (b. 1618)
- date unknown but before May 8 – Joseph Bridger, Colonial Governor of Virginia (b. 1631)

1687

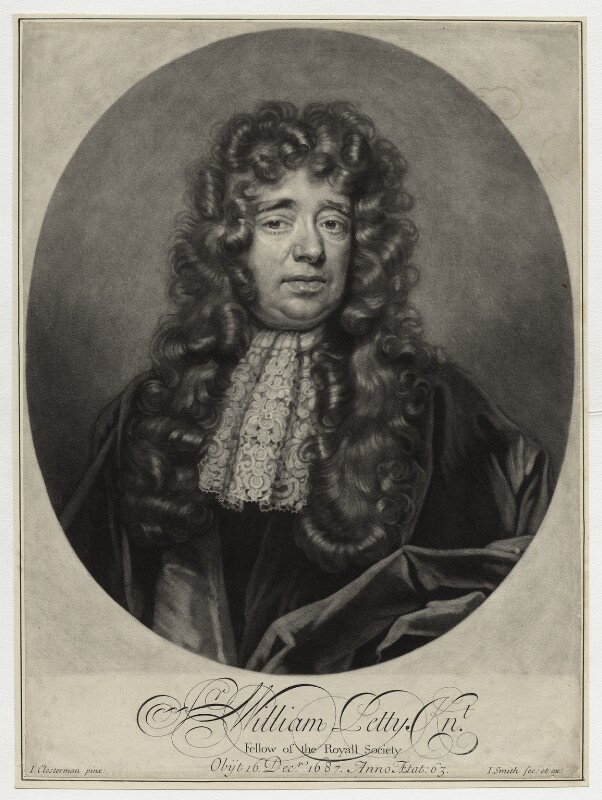
William Petty

- January 11 – Jean Claude, French Protestant clergyman (b. 1619)
- January 28 – Johannes Hevelius, Polish astronomer (b. 1611)
- January 31 – Francisco Varo, Spanish linguist (b. 1627)
- February 15 – Marie Elisabeth of Brunswick-Wolfenbüttel, German noblewoman (b. 1638)
- February 16 – Charles Cotton, English poet and writer (b. 1630)
- February 22 – Jean Hamon, French doctor and writer (b. 1618)
- February 26 – Magdalena Elisabeth of Hanau, German noblewoman (b. 1611)
- March 19 – René-Robert Cavelier, Sieur de La Salle, French explorer (b. 1643)
- March 20 – Margravine Magdalene Sibylle of Brandenburg-Bayreuth, Electress of Saxony by marriage (b. 1612)
- March 20 – Marie Eleonore of Dietrichstein, Countess of Kaunitz and Oppersdorf (b. 1623)
- March 22 – Jean-Baptiste Lully, French composer, established opera in France (b. 1632)
- March 28 – Constantijn Huygens, Dutch poet and composer (b. 1596)
- April 12 – Ambrose Dixon, Virginia Colony pioneer (b. c. 1628)
- April 16 – George Villiers, 2nd Duke of Buckingham, English statesman (b. 1628)
- April 20 – Richard Olmsted, Connecticut settler (b. 1612)
- April 23 – Ferdinand Albert I, Duke of Brunswick-Lüneburg (b. 1636)
- April 25 – Johannes Caioni, Transylvanian Franciscan friar (b. 1629)
- July 19 – Laura Martinozzi, Duchess consort of Modena (b. 1639)
- August 9 – Niccolò Albergati-Ludovisi, Italian Catholic cardinal (b. 1608)
- September 1 – Henry More, English philosopher (b. 1614)
- September 12 – John Alden, English-born Mayflower crewman (b. c. 1599)
- September 28 – Francis Turretin, Swiss theologian (b. 1623)
- October 13 – Geminiano Montanari, Italian astronomer (b. 1633)
- October 19 – Giulio Bartolocci, Italian Biblical scholar (b. 1613)
- October 21 – Edmund Waller, English poet (b. 1606)
- October 24 – Countess Palatine Maria Eufrosyne of Zweibrücken, Swedish princess (b. 1625)
- November 4
  - Jacques Leneuf de La Poterie, Norman nobleman, seigneur and fur trader in New France (b. 1604)
  - Johanna Walpurgis of Leiningen-Westerburg, German noblewoman, by marriage Duchess of Saxe-Weissenfels (b. 1647)
- November 6 – Charles de Grimaldi-Régusse, French aristocrat (b. 1612)
- November 14 – Nell Gwyn, English actress, a mistress of Charles II of England (b. 1650)
- November 18 – Anton Janson, Dutch typefounder and printer (b. 1620)
- December 10 – Horatio Townshend, 1st Viscount Townshend, English viscount (b. 1630)
- December 16 – Sir William Petty, English philosopher, scientist and economist (b. 1623)
- December 21 – Elizabeth Tilley, English pilgrim settler in North America who was one of the original passengers of the Mayflower (b. 1607)
- date unknown – Josias Fendall, Colonial governor of Maryland (b. c. 1628)

1688

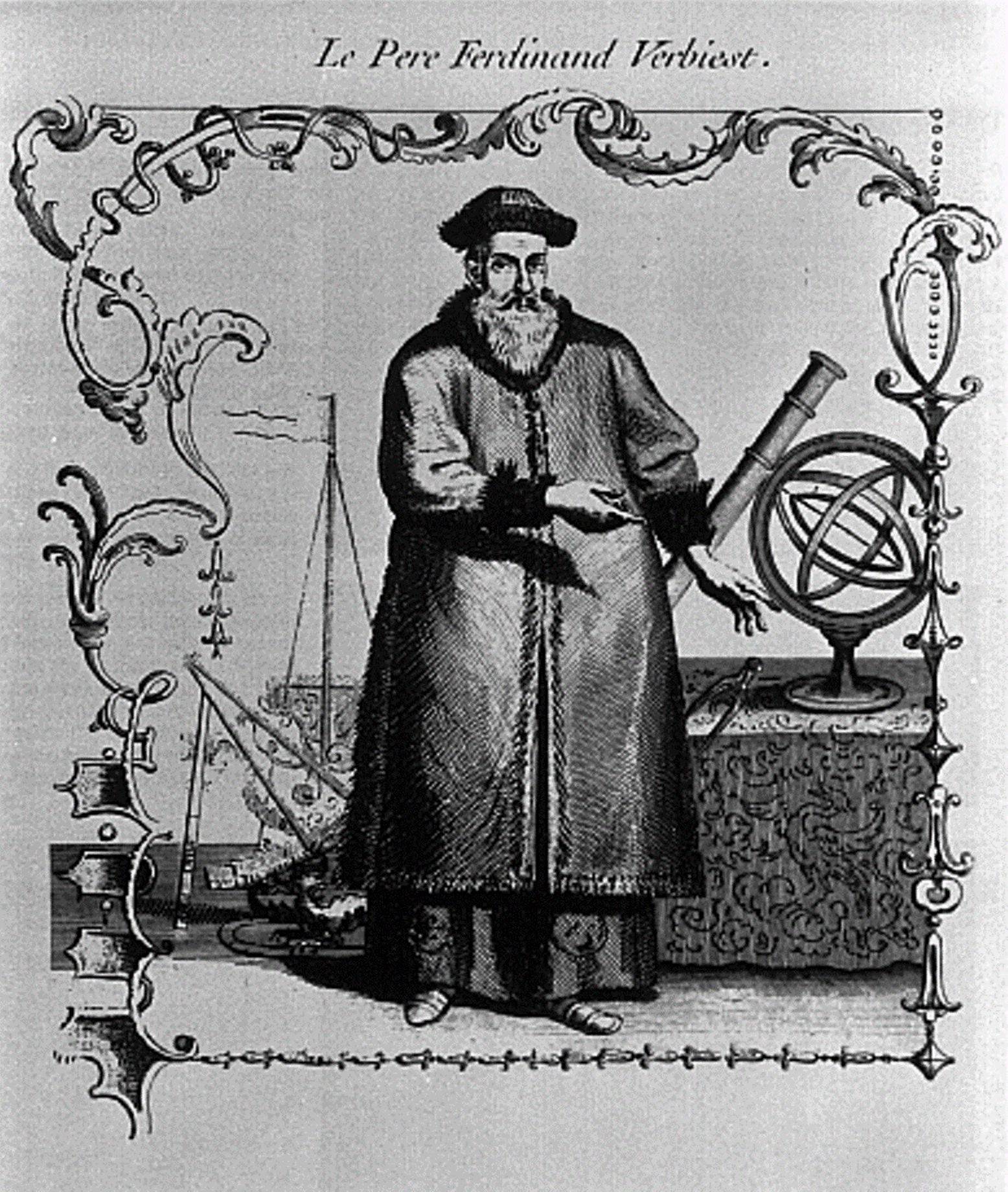
Ferdinand Verbiest

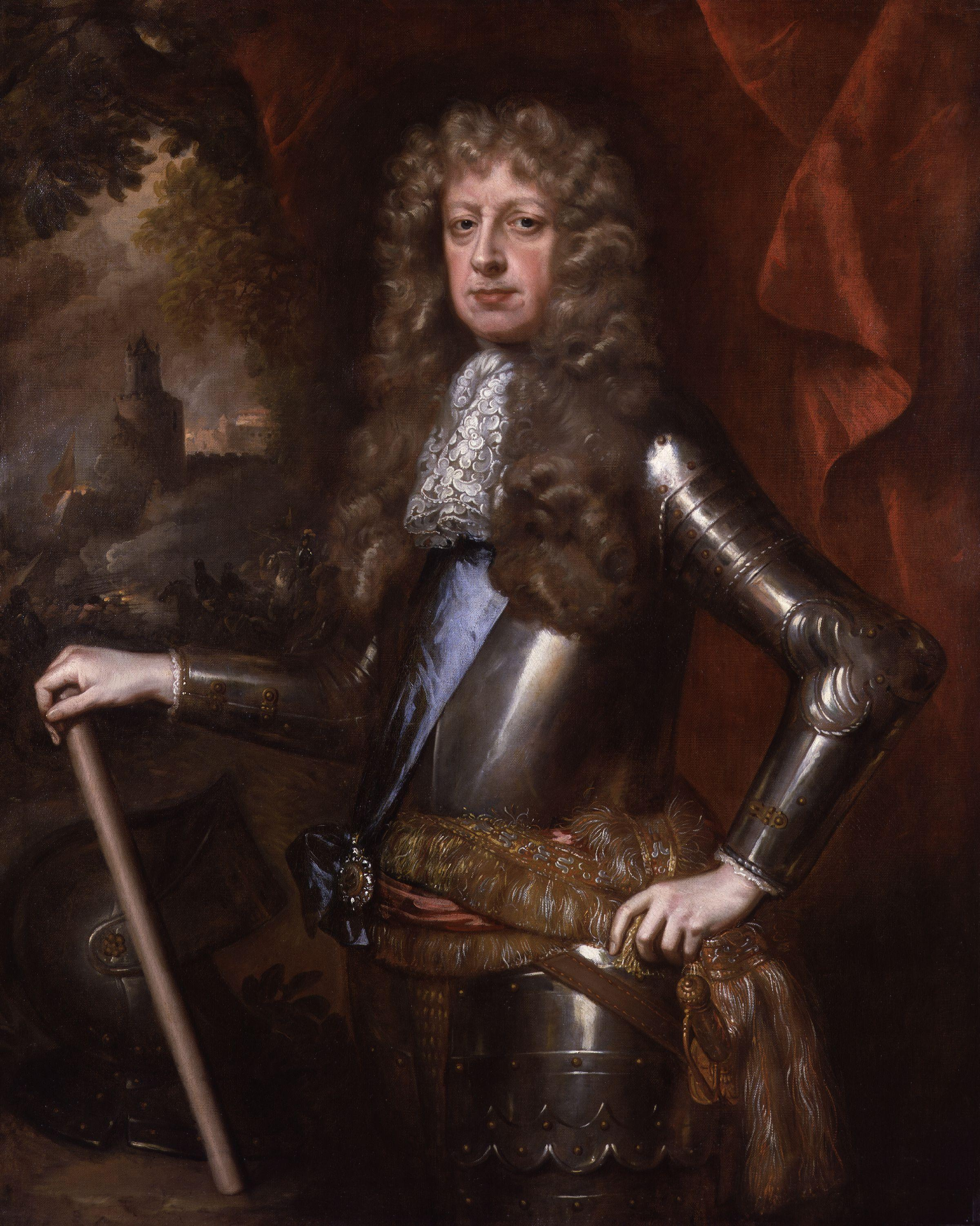
James Butler, 1st Duke of Ormond

- January 7 – James Howard, 3rd Earl of Suffolk
- January 27 – Empress Dowager Xiaozhuang, concubine of Qing Dynasty ruler Hong Taiji (b. 1613)
- January 28 – Ferdinand Verbiest, Flemish Jesuit missionary in China (b. 1623)
- February 2 – Abraham Duquesne, French naval officer (b. 1610)
- February 13 – David Christiani, German mathematician and philosopher (b. 1610)
- February 17 – James Renwick, Scottish minister and Covenanter martyr (b. 1662)
- February 28 – Johann Sigismund Elsholtz, German naturalist and physician (b. 1623)
- March 1 – Sir Thomas Slingsby, 2nd Baronet of England (b. 1636)
- March 3 – Marie de Lorraine, Duchess of Guise (b. 1615)
- March 8 – Honoré Fabri, French mathematician (b. 1608)
- March 20 – Maria of Orange-Nassau, Dutch princess (b. 1642)
- March 23 – Marcantonio Giustinian, 107th Doge of Venice (b. 1619)
- March 26 – Winston Churchill, English noble, soldier (b. 1620)
- March 27 – Frederick, Burgrave of Dohna, Dutch officer, and governor of Orange (b. 1621)
- April 28 – Frederick, Duke of Mecklenburg-Grabow, German nobleman, titular Duke of Mecklenburg (b. 1638)
- April 29 – Friedrich Wilhelm, Elector of Brandenburg (b. 1620)
- May 14 – Antoine Furetière, French writer (b. 1619)
- May 22 – Johannes Andreas Quenstedt, German theologian (b. 1617)
- June 1 – Peder Hansen Resen, Danish historian (b. 1625)
- June 3 – Maximilian Henry of Bavaria, Roman Catholic bishop (b. 1621)
- June 5 – Constantine Phaulkon, Greek adventurer (b. 1647)
- June 26
  - John Claypole, English politician (b. 1625)
  - Ralph Cudworth, English philosopher (b. 1617)
- June 28 – Richard Winwood, English politician (b. 1609)
- June 29 – Ippolito Lante Montefeltro della Rovere, Italian nobleman and Duke of Bomarzo (b. 1618)
- July 11 – King Narai of Thailand (b. 1639)
- July 21 – James Butler, 1st Duke of Ormonde, Irish statesman (b. 1610)
- August 25 – Henry Morgan, Welsh privateer and Governor of Jamaica (b. c. 1635)
- August 31 – John Bunyan, English writer (b. 1628)
- September 2 – Robert Viner, Lord Mayor of London (b. 1631)
- September 9 – Claude Mellan, French painter and engraver (b. 1598)
- September 13 – Sir John Bright, 1st Baronet, English politician (b. 1619)
- September 15 – Otto Wilhelm Königsmarck, German-Swedish Nobleman (b. 1639)
- September 20 – Queen Jangnyeol, Korean royal consort (b. 1624)
- November 26 – Jacques Goulet, early pioneer in New France (now Québec) (b. 1615)
- October 4
  - Philips Koninck, Dutch painter (b. 1619)
  - Roger Pepys, English lawyer and politician (b. 1617)
- October 6 – Christopher Monck, 2nd Duke of Albemarle, English statesman (b. 1653)
- October 9 – Claude Perrault, French architect (b. 1613)
- October 14 – Joachim von Sandrart, German Baroque art-historian and painter (b. 1606)
- October 23 – Charles du Fresne, sieur du Cange, French philologist (b. 1610)
- November 26 – Philippe Quinault, French dramatist (b. 1635)
- November 29 – Bohuslav Balbín, Czech writer and Jesuit (b. 1621)
- December 4 – Sir Edward Seymour, 3rd Baronet, Member of Parliament (b. 1610)
- December 8 – Thomas Flatman, British artist (b. 1635)
- December 15 – Gaspar Fagel, Dutch statesman (b. 1634)
- December 15 – Louis Victor de Rochechouart de Mortemart, French military man, brother of Madame de Montespan (b. 1636)

1689

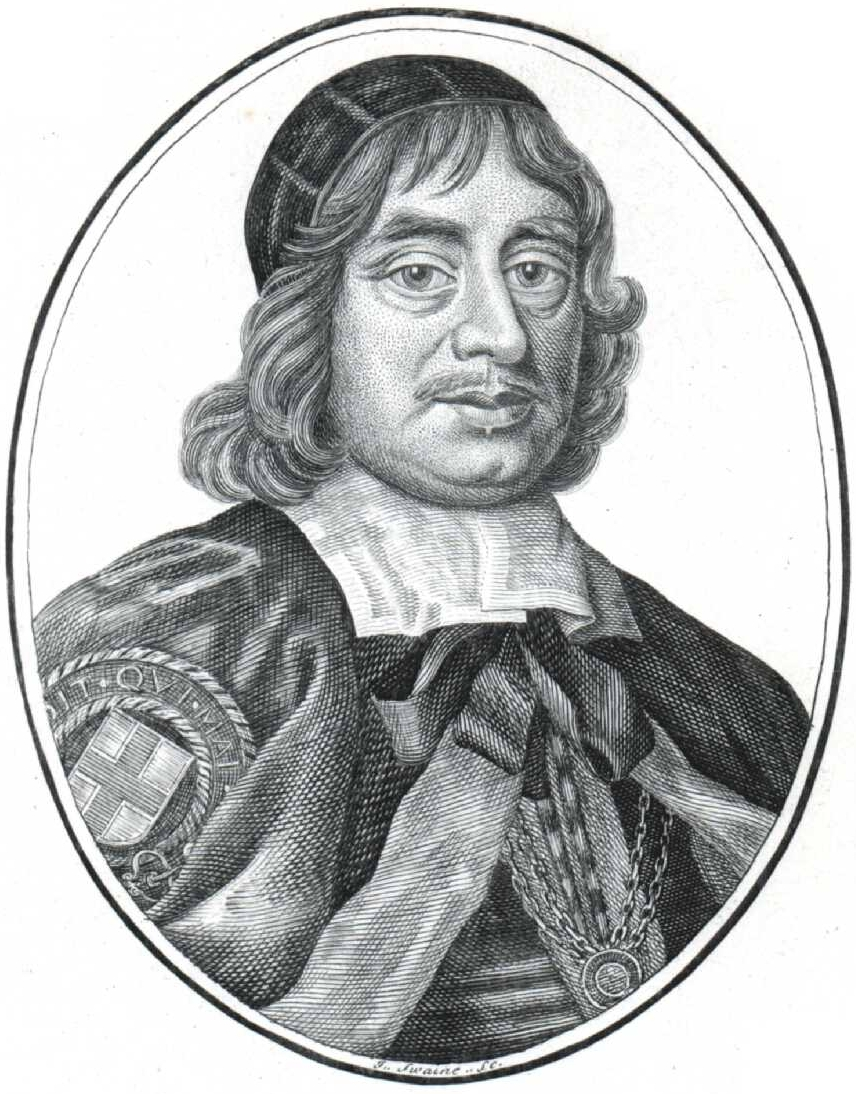
Seth Ward (bishop of Salisbury) died 6 January

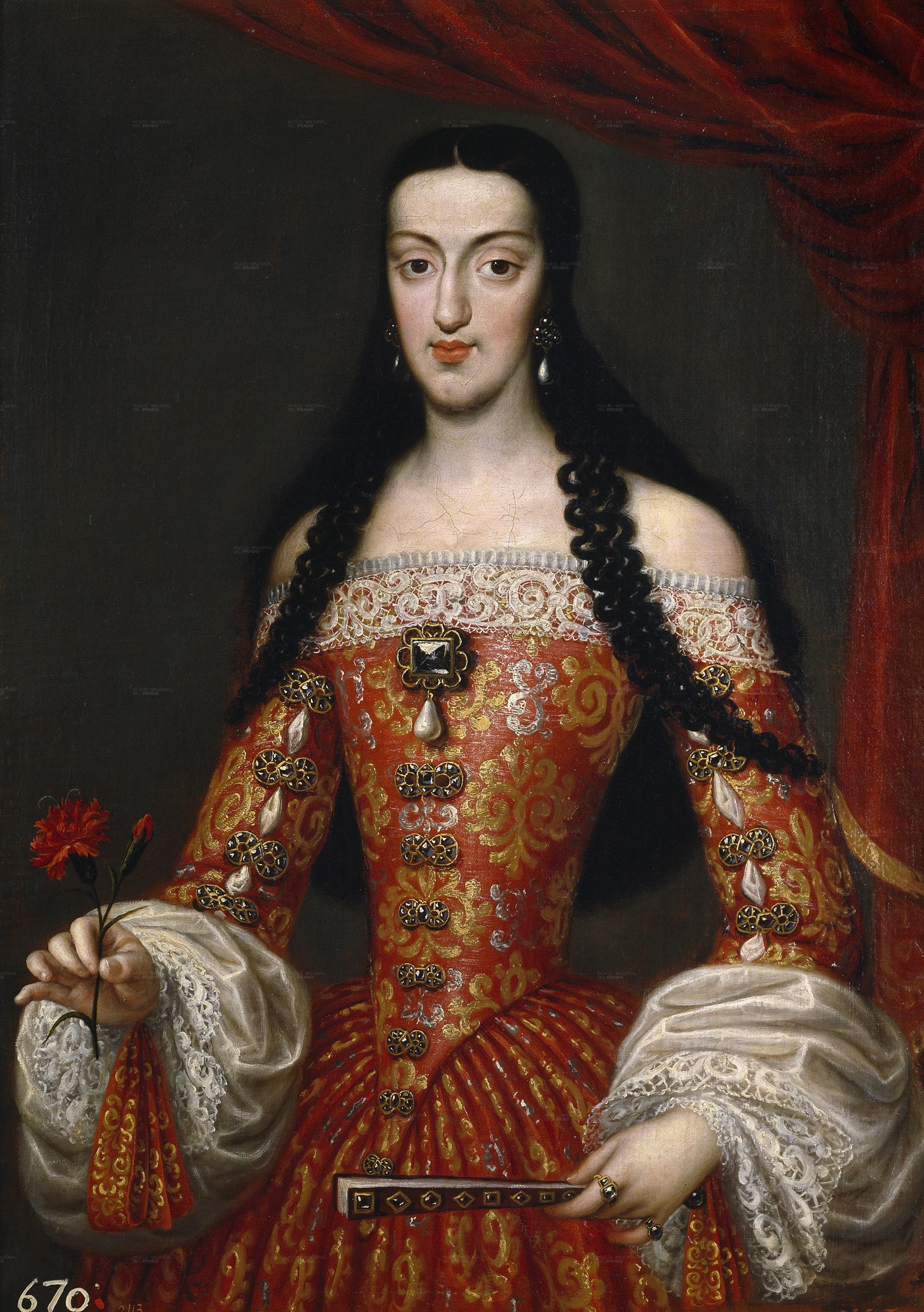
Marie Louise d'Orléans died 12 February

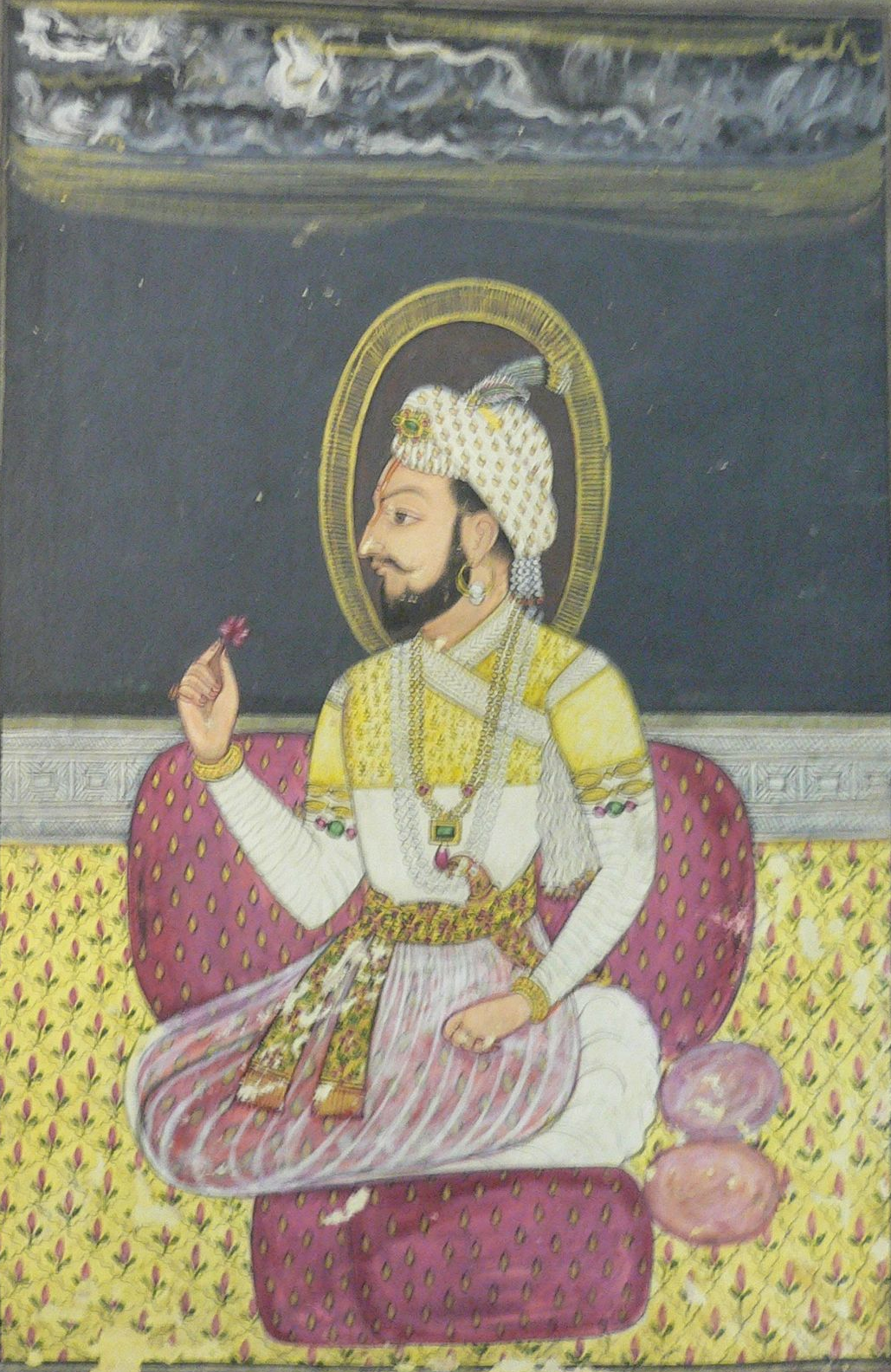
Sambhaji died 11 March

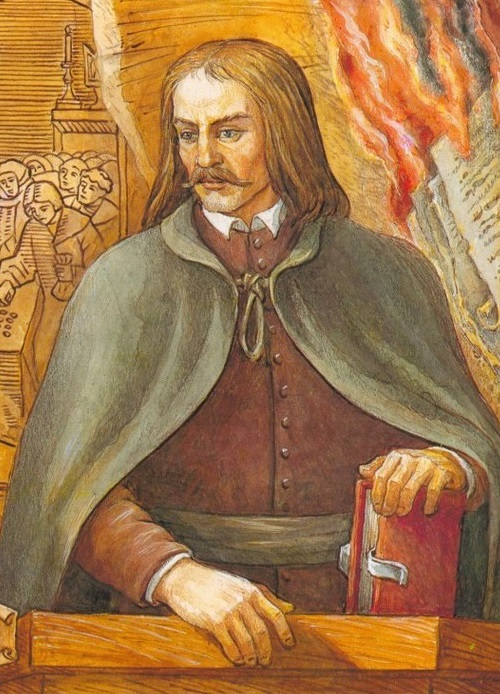
Kazimierz Łyszczyński died 30 March

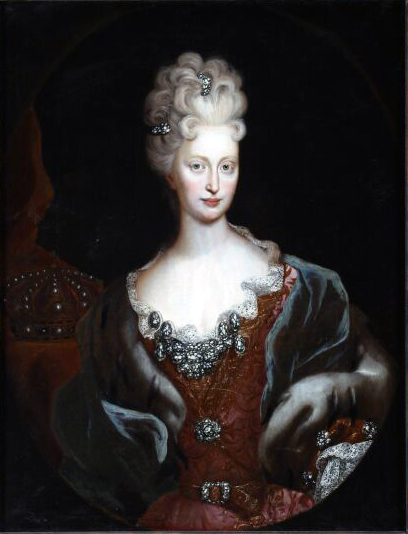
Archduchess Maria Anna Josepha of Austria died 4 April

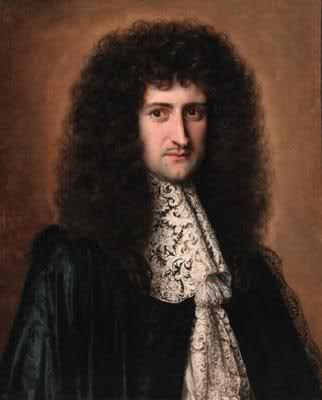
Lorenzo Onofrio Colonna died 14 April

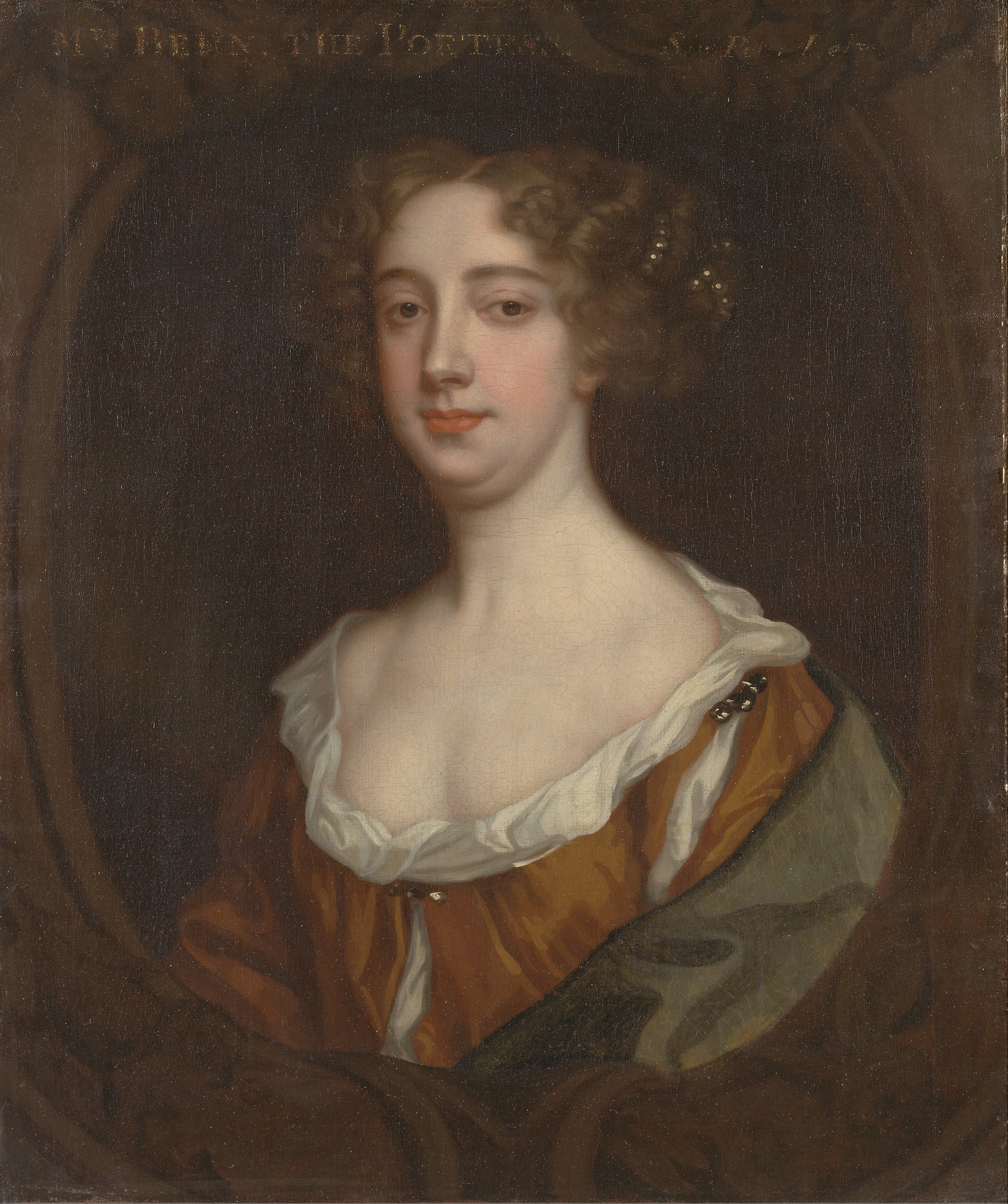
Aphra Behn died 16 April

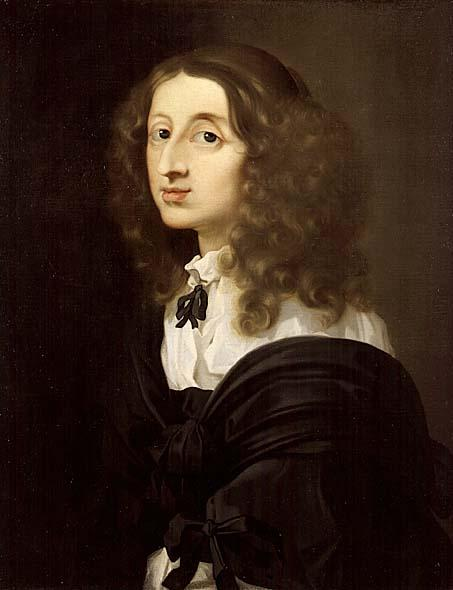
Christina, Queen of Sweden died 19 April

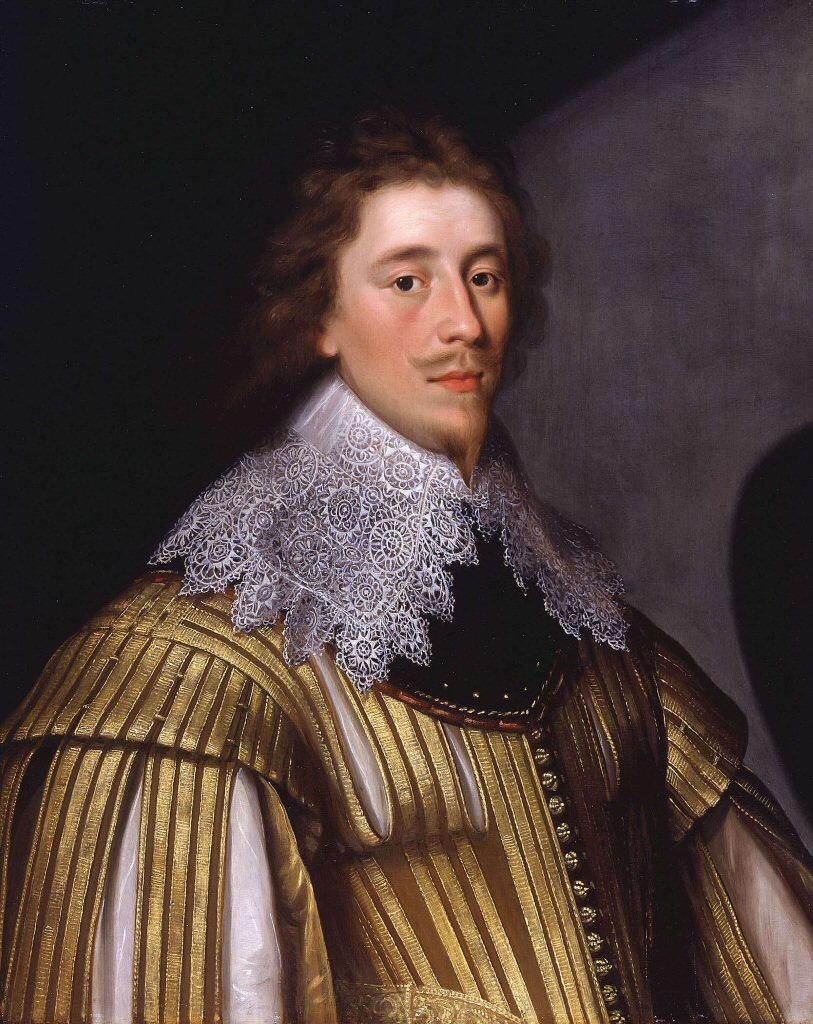
Conyers Darcy, 1st Earl of Holderness died 14 June

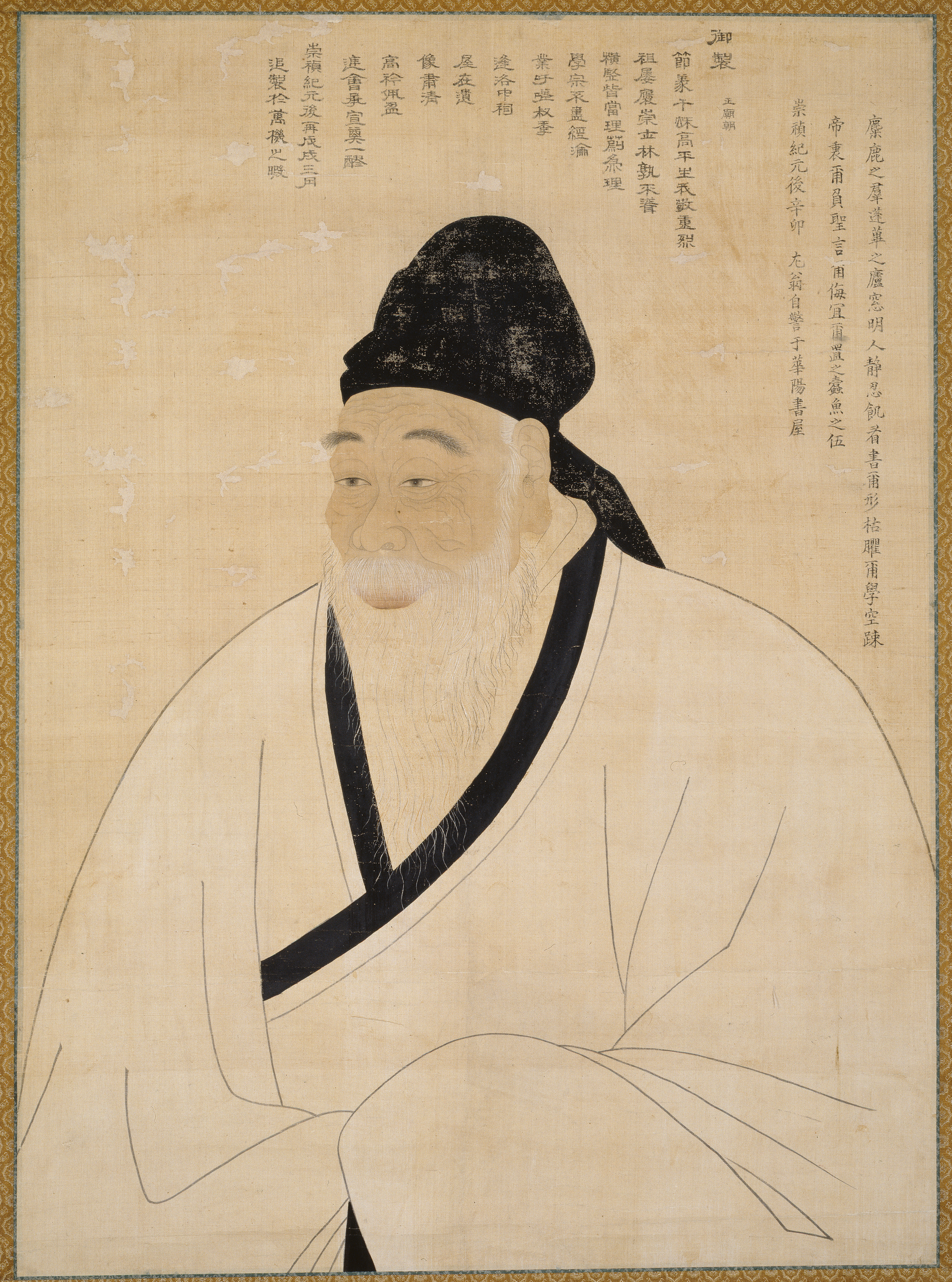
Song Si-yeol died 19 July

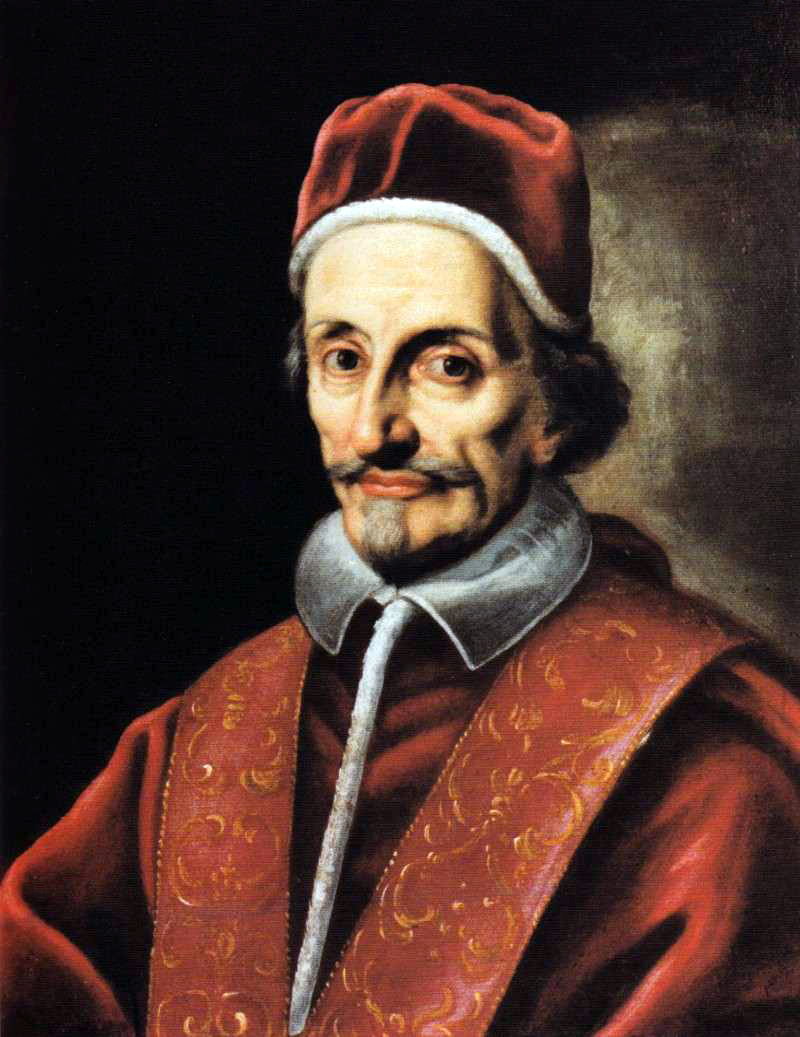
Pope Innocent XI died 12 August

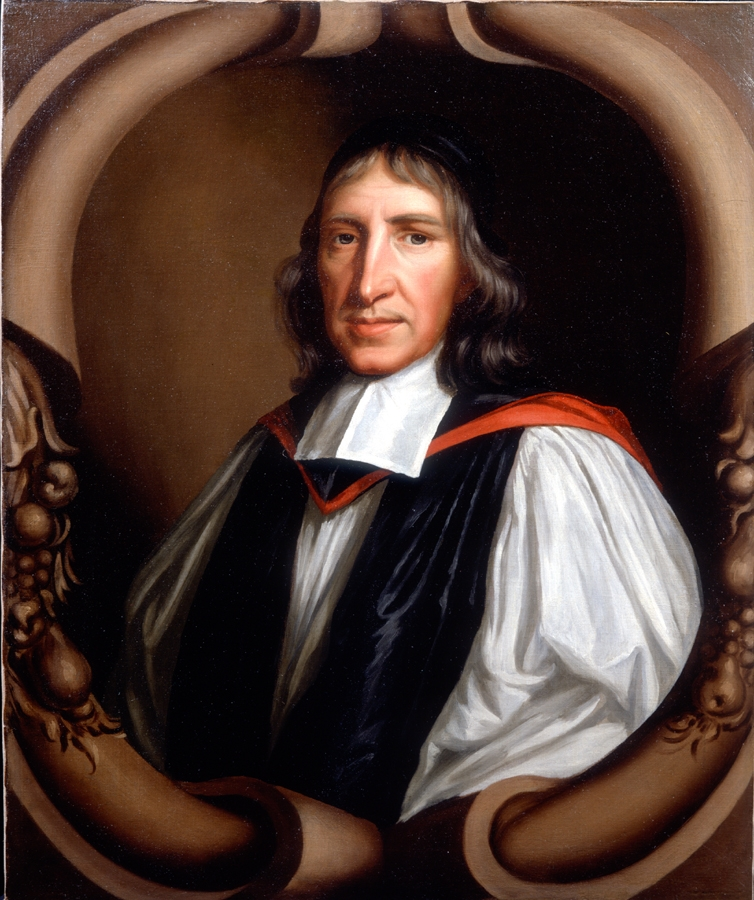
John Lake (bishop) died 30 August

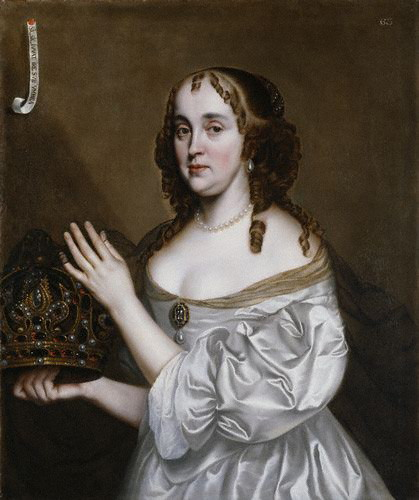
Jane Lane, Lady Fisher died 9 September

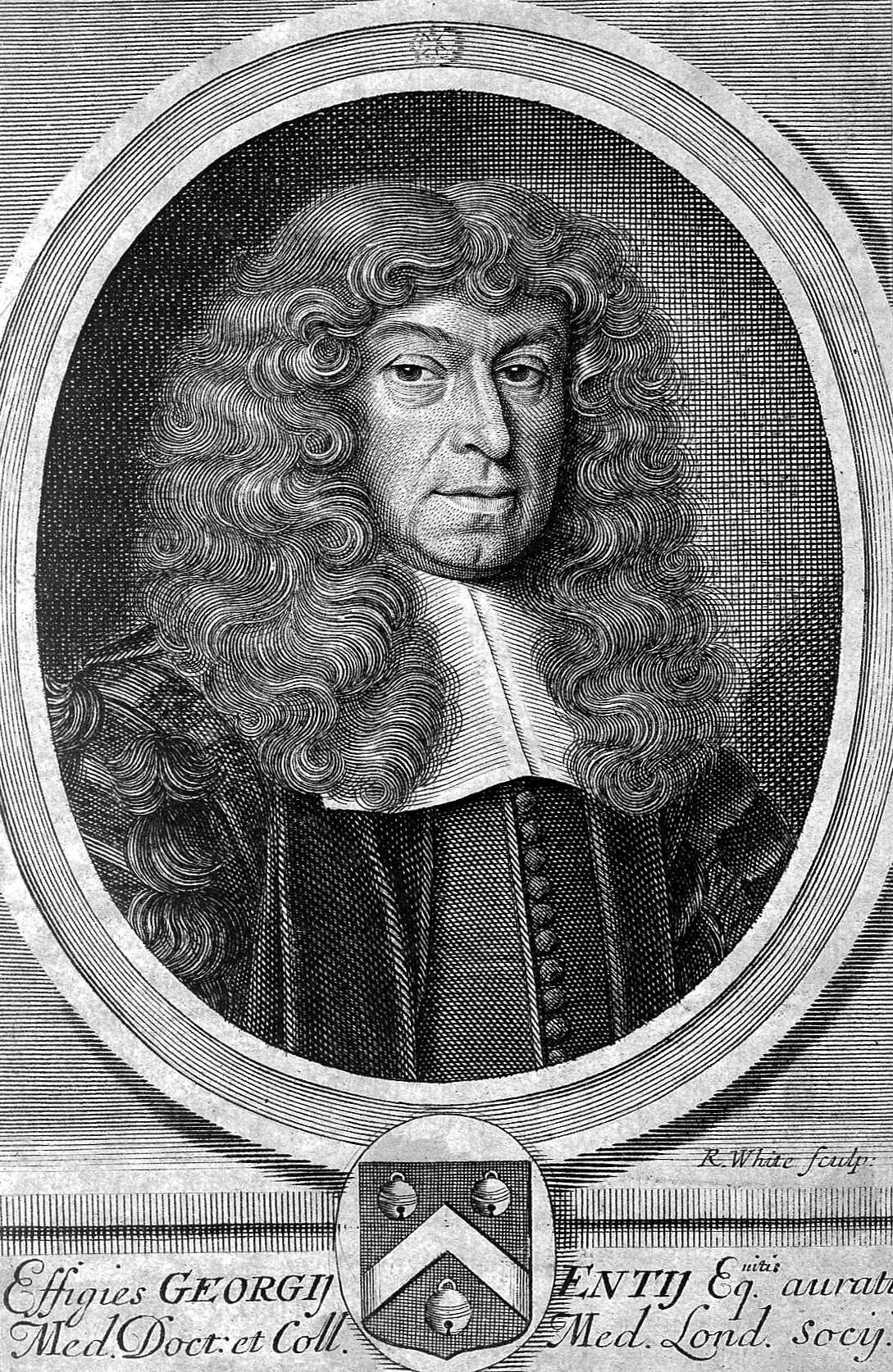
George Ent died 13 October

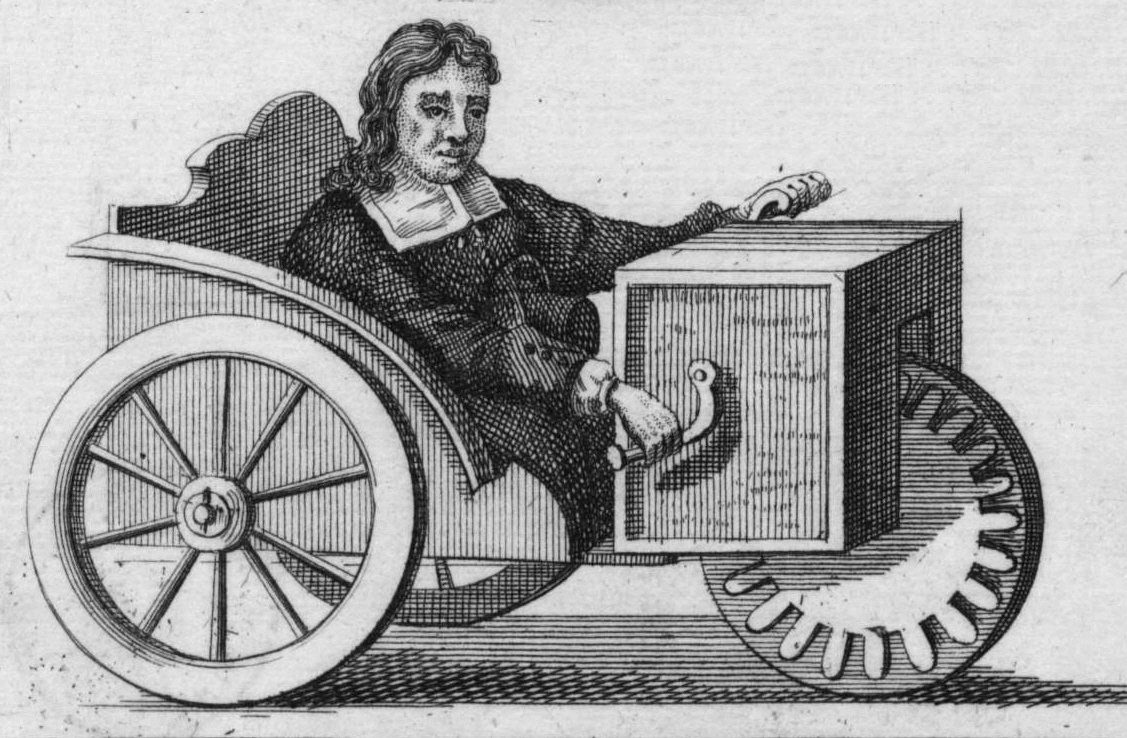
Stephan Farffler died 24 October

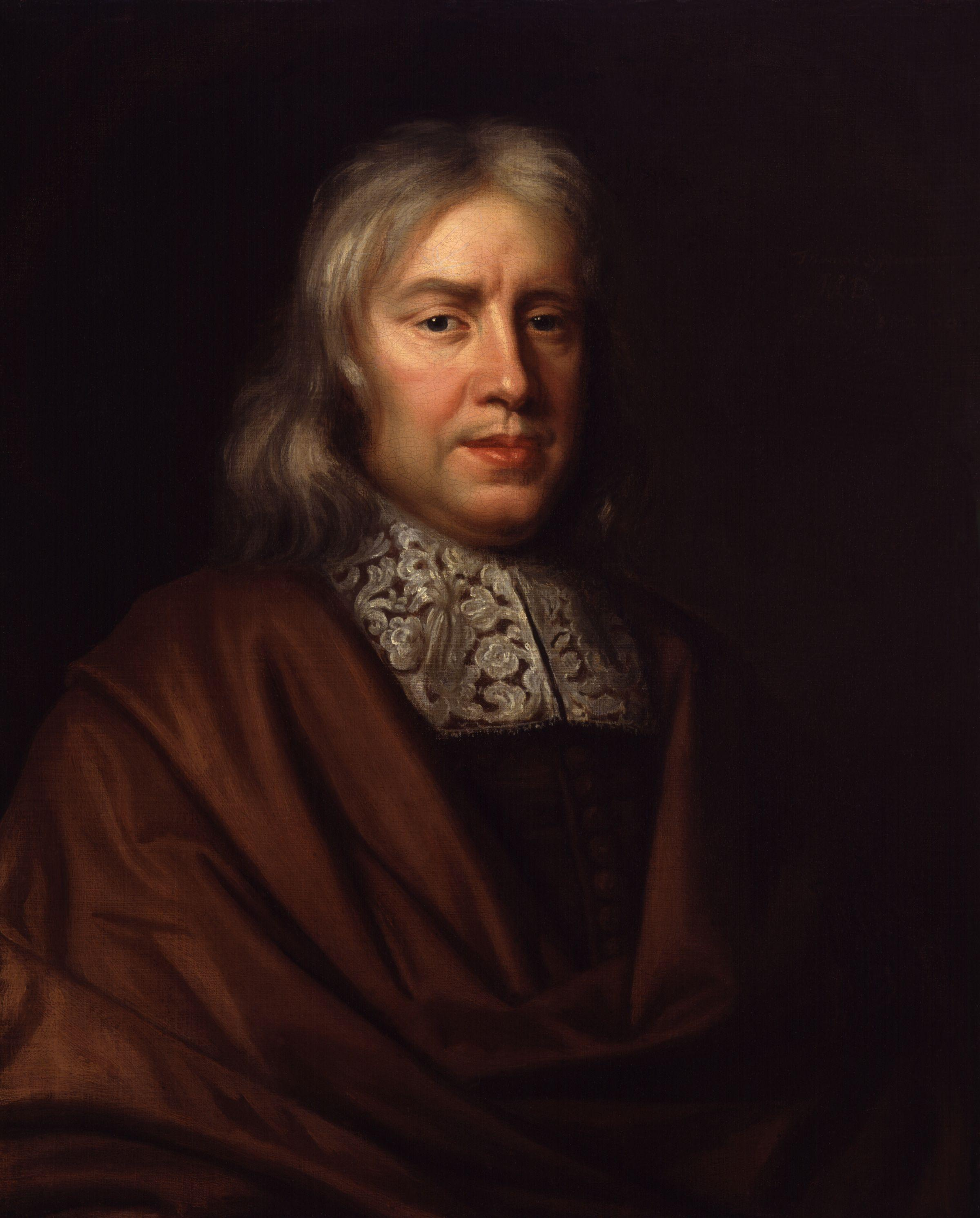
Thomas Sydenham died 29 December

- January 6
  - Cristoforo Ivanovich, Venetian historian and librettist of Serb origin (b. 1628)
  - Bishop Seth Ward, Bishop of Salisbury, mathematician and astronomer (b. 1617)
- January 9 – Sir Hugh Cholmeley, 4th Baronet, English politician (b. 1632)
- January 16 – Gilbert Holles, 3rd Earl of Clare, English politician (b. 1633)
- January 18
  - Ernest Günther I, Duke of Schleswig-Holstein-Sonderburg-Augustenburg (b. 1609)
  - Humphrey Lloyd, British bishop (b. 1610)
- January 24 – Henry Waldegrave, 1st Baron Waldegrave, English peer and Jacobite supporter (b. 1661)
- January 27
  - Robert Aske, merchant & haberdasher in the City of London (b. 1619)
  - Sir Henry Beaumont, 2nd Baronet, English politician (b. 1638)
  - Thomas Colepeper, 2nd Baron Colepeper, English noble and colonial governor of Virginia (b. 1635)
- January 28 – Bernardino Corniani, Roman Catholic prelate, Bishop of Pula (b. 1626)
- January 29 – Maria van Cortlandt van Rensselaer, Dutch director of Rensselaerswyck (Albany, New York) (b. 1645)
- January 31 – Manuel de Herrera, Roman Catholic prelate, Bishop of Durango (b. 1635)
- February 1 – Sir John Borlase, 2nd Baronet, English politician (b. 1642)
- February 4 – Moshe ben Yonatan Galante, Ottoman rabbi (b. 1621)
- February 5 – William Coddington Jr., Rhode Island colonial governor (b. 1651)
- February 6 – Metcalfe Robinson, English politician (b. 1629)
- February 8 – Sir John Gell, 2nd Baronet, English politician (b. 1613)
- February 12 – Marie Louise d'Orléans, Queen of Spain as the wife of King Charles II (b. 1662)
- February 13 – Carlo Pio di Savoia, Italian Catholic cardinal (b. 1622)
- February 18 – Alexander Farnese, Prince of Parma, Spanish politician and military personnel (b. 1635)
- February 19 – Khushal Khattak, Afghan poet (b. 1613)
- February 21 – Isaac Vossius, Dutch classical scholar (b. 1618)
- February 22 – Willem Ogier, Flemish playwright (b. 1618)
- February 24 – Elsa Elisabeth Brahe, Swedish countess and duchess (b. 1632)
- February 28 – Thomas Benedict, American settler (b. 1617)
- March 7 – Franz Johann von Vogt von Altensumerau und Prasberg, Bishop of Constance (b. 1611)
- March 8 – Alexander Parker, British minister (b. 1628)
- March 9 – François Adhémar de Monteil, French priest, Bishop of Saint-Paul-Trois-Châteaux (b. 1603)
- March 10 – Philip Louis, Duke of Schleswig-Holstein-Sonderburg-Wiesenburg (b. 1620)
- March 11
  - Kim Ik-hun, Korean General and philosopher, soldier, politician (b. 1619)
  - Sambhaji, High Protector of the Maratha Empire (b. 1657)
- March 14 – Anthony Coucheron, Norwegian engineer (b. 1650)
- March 15 – Yolo, Qing dynasty prince (b. 1625)
- March 18 – John Dixwell, regicide (b. 1607)
- March 24
  - Thomas Ballard, American politician (b. 1630)
  - Michiel ten Hove, Grand Pensionary of Holland (b. 1640)
- March 26 – Gabriel Milan, Governor of the Danish West Indies (b. 1631)
- March 29 – Sir John Hotham, 2nd Baronet, Member of the House of Commons of England (b. 1632)
- March 30 – Kazimierz Łyszczyński, Polish philosopher (b. 1634)
- March 31 – Tommaso Caracciolo, Bishop of Gerace (b. 1640)
- April 4 – Archduchess Maria Anna Josepha of Austria, youngest surviving daughter of Ferdinand III (b. 1654)
- April 12 – John Hunting, first ruling elder of the church of Dedham, Massachusetts (b. 1602)
- April 14 – Lorenzo Onofrio Colonna, Italian noble (b. 1637)
- April 16 – Aphra Behn, British playwright, poet and spy (b. 1640)
- April 18 – George Jeffreys, 1st Baron Jeffreys, Welsh judge, aka the Hanging Judge (b. 1645)
- April 19 – Christina, Queen of Sweden, ruled from 1632 until abdication in 1654 (b. 1626)
- April 22 – Thomas Proby, English politician (b. 1632)
- May 11 – Charles Goodall, English poet (b. 1671)
- May 12 – Sir John Reresby, 2nd Baronet, English politician and diarist (b. 1634)
- May 15 – Jean Paul Médaille, French Jesuit missionary (b. 1618)
- May 20 – Estevão Brioso de Figueiredo, Roman Catholic prelate, Bishop of Funchal of Olinda (b. 1630)
- May 23 – Charles Erskine, Earl of Mar, Scottish noble (b. 1650)
- May 25 – Charles Errard, French painter (b. 1606)
- June 4 – René Gaultier de Varennes, New France governor (b. 1635)
- June 7 – Alphonse de Berghes, Roman Catholic archbishop (b. 1624)
- June 8 – Decio Azzolino, Italian Catholic cardinal (b. 1623)
- June 9 – François Bonnemer, French painter and engraver (b. 1638)
- June 10 – Christophe Veyrier, sculptor (b. 1637)
- June 13 – William Annand, Minister of the Church of Scotland and the Church of England (b. 1633)
- June 14 – Conyers Darcy, 1st Earl of Holderness, English noble (b. 1598)
- June 17
  - Jan Baptist de Crépu, Flemish painter and army officer (b. 1631)
  - Marcin Zamoyski, Polish noble (b. 1637)
- June 20
  - Willem Coucheron, Dutch general in the Dano-Norwegian army (b. 1600)
  - Richard Sherlock, English Anglican priest (b. 1612)
- June 21 – Thomas Blanchet, French painter (b. 1614)
- June 25 – William Thomas, Welsh Anglican bishop (b. 1613)
- June 27 – Richard Waldron, colonial settler, acting President of the Province of New Hampshire (b. 1615)
- June 28 – Thomas Mainwaring, English politician (b. 1623)
- July 1 – Anne Crawford-Lindsay, Scottish nobility (b. 1631)
- July 2 – Edward Villiers, 1st Duke of Buckingham (b. 1620)
- July 7 – Princess Louise of Savoy, Hereditary Princess of Baden-Baden (b. 1627)
- July 8
  - Menahem Mendel Auerbach, Austrian banker and rabbi (b. 1620)
  - Edward Wooster, English Connecticut pioneer (b. 1622)
- July 19 – Song Si-yeol, Korean philosopher (b. 1607)
- July 23 – Frederick Wilhelm von Pfalz-Neuburg, German noble (b. 1665)
- July 27 – John Graham, 1st Viscount Dundee, Scottish general (b. 1648)
- August 6 – Princess Dorothea Sophie of Schleswig-Holstein-Sonderburg-Glücksburg, Electress of Brandenburg (b. 1636)
- August 9 – Dionisio Lazzari, Italian sculptor and architect (b. 1617)
- August 12 – Pope Innocent XI, pope of the Catholic Church (b. 1611)
- August 13 – Count Maximilian I, Prince of Hohenzollern-Sigmaringen, Count of Hohenzollern-Sigmaringen (b. 1636)
- August 15 – John Gregory, Connecticut settler (b. 1612)
- August 17
  - William Boynton, English politician (b. 1641)
  - Thomas Street, astronomer (b. 1621)
- August 20 – Antonio Marinari, Roman Catholic prelate, Auxiliary Bishop of Ostia-Velletri, Titular Bishop of Thagaste (b. 1605)
- August 21 – William Cleland, Scottish poet and soldier (b. c. 1661)
- August 28
  - Claude-Jean Allouez, French Jesuit missionary and explorer of North America (b. 1622)
  - Alexander Coosemans, Flemish still life painter (b. 1627)
- August 29 – Curwen Rawlinson, English politician (b. 1641)
- August 30 – John Lake, English bishop (b. 1624)
- September 6 – Torii Tadanori, Daimyo who ruled the Takatō Domain in Shinano Province (b. 1646)
- September 9 – Jane Lane, Lady Fisher, English Royalist (b. 1626)
- September 10 – John Belasyse, 1st Baron Belasyse, English politician and noble (b. 1614)
- September 13 – Ciro Ferri, Italian painter, engraver, sculptor and architect (b. 1634)
- September 15
  - Balthasar Cellarius, German theologian (b. 1614)
  - Timoléon Cheminais de Montaigu, French theologian (b. 1652)
- September 18 – Sir Richard Head, 1st Baronet, English politician (b. 1600)
- September 26 – August, Duke of Schleswig-Holstein-Sonderburg-Beck (b. 1652)
- September 30 – Julius Francis, Duke of Saxe-Lauenburg, Bohemian noble (b. 1641)
- October 1 – Alexander Voet the Elder, Flemish engraver (b. 1608)
- October 4 – Quirinus Kuhlmann, German Baroque poet and mystic (b. 1651)
- October 11 – Fyodor Shaklovity, Russian diplomat (b. 1640)
- October 13 – George Ent, English scientist and physician; (b. 1604)
- October 14 – Adolph John I, Count Palatine of Kleeburg, Swedish prince (b. 1629)
- October 15 – Sir Edward Dering, 3rd Baronet, English politician (b. 1650)
- October 24 – Stephan Farffler, German inventor (b. 1633)
- October 25 – Joseph Maynard, English politician (b. 1639)
- October 30 – Pier Antonio Capobianco, Roman Catholic prelate, Bishop of Lacedonia (b. 1619)
- November 9 – Enea Silvio Piccolomini, imperial general (b. 1651)
- November 12 – Justus de Verwer, Dutch painter and illustrator (b. 1625)
- November 13
  - Matteo Borboni, Italian painter (b. 1610)
  - Philipp von Zesen, German poet (b. 1619)
- November 16 – Cornelis Mahu, Flemish painter (b. 1613)
- November 18 – Jacob van der Ulft, painter from the Northern Netherlands (b. 1621)
- November 19 – Elizabeth Cavendish, Countess of Devonshire, English noblewoman; (b. 1619)
- November 20 – Samuel Peterson, American city founder (b. 1639)
- November 24 – Carey Dillon, 5th Earl of Roscommon, Irish nobleman and professional soldier (b. 1627)
- November 26 – Marquard Gude, German archaeologist (b. 1635)
- December 2 – George Speke, English politician (b. 1623)
- December 6 – Pjetër Bogdani, Albanian priest and writer (b. c. 1630)
- December 12 – Louis Ferdinand Elle the Elder, French painter (b. 1612)
- December 15 – Anne Neville, abbess of Pontoise (b. 1605)
- December 16
  - Cornelis Geelvinck, Dutch mayor (b. 1621)
  - Thomas Wyndham, English Member of Parliament (b. 1640)
- December 25 – Oliver Montagu, English Member of Parliament (b. 1655)
- December 27 – Gervase Bryan, English clergyman (b. 1622)
- December 28 – Pietro Montanini, Italian painter (b. 1626)
- December 29
  - Olfert Dapper, Dutch physician and writer (b. 1636)
  - George Kinnaird, 1st Lord Kinnaird, Scottish aristocrat (b. 1622)
  - Françoise Bertaut de Motteville, French writer (b. 1621)
  - Thomas Sydenham, English physician (b. 1624)
- December 31
  - Felipe Fernandez de Pardo, Roman Catholic prelate, Archbishop of Manila (b. 1611)
  - Gilbert de Choiseul Duplessis Praslin, Roman Catholic bishop (b. 1613)
  - Anders Sinclair, Scottish soldier who joined Swedish service during the Thirty Years' War (b. 1614)
