= 1689 =

1689 in various calendars
- Gregorian calendar: 1689; MDCLXXXIX
- Ab urbe condita: 2442
- Armenian calendar: 1138; ԹՎ ՌՃԼԸ
- Assyrian calendar: 6439
- Balinese saka calendar: 1610–1611
- Bengali calendar: 1095–1096
- Berber calendar: 2639
- English Regnal year: 1 Will. & Mar. – 2 Will. & Mar.
- Buddhist calendar: 2233
- Burmese calendar: 1051
- Byzantine calendar: 7197–7198
- Chinese calendar: 戊辰年 (Earth Dragon); 4386 or 4179 — to — 己巳年 (Earth Snake); 4387 or 4180
- Coptic calendar: 1405–1406
- Discordian calendar: 2855
- Ethiopian calendar: 1681–1682
- Hebrew calendar: 5449–5450
- Hindu calendars
- Vikram Samvat: 1745–1746
- Shaka Samvat: 1610–1611
- Kali Yuga: 4789–4790
- Holocene calendar: 11689
- Igbo calendar: 689–690
- Iranian calendar: 1067–1068
- Islamic calendar: 1100–1101
- Japanese calendar: Genroku 2 (元禄２年)
- Javanese calendar: 1612–1613
- Julian calendar: Gregorian minus 10 days
- Korean calendar: 4022
- Minguo calendar: 223 before ROC 民前223年
- Nanakshahi calendar: 221
- Thai solar calendar: 2231–2232
- Tibetan calendar: ས་ཕོ་འབྲུག་ལོ་ (male Earth-Dragon); 1815 or 1434 or 662 — to — ས་མོ་སྦྲུལ་ལོ་ (female Earth-Snake); 1816 or 1435 or 663

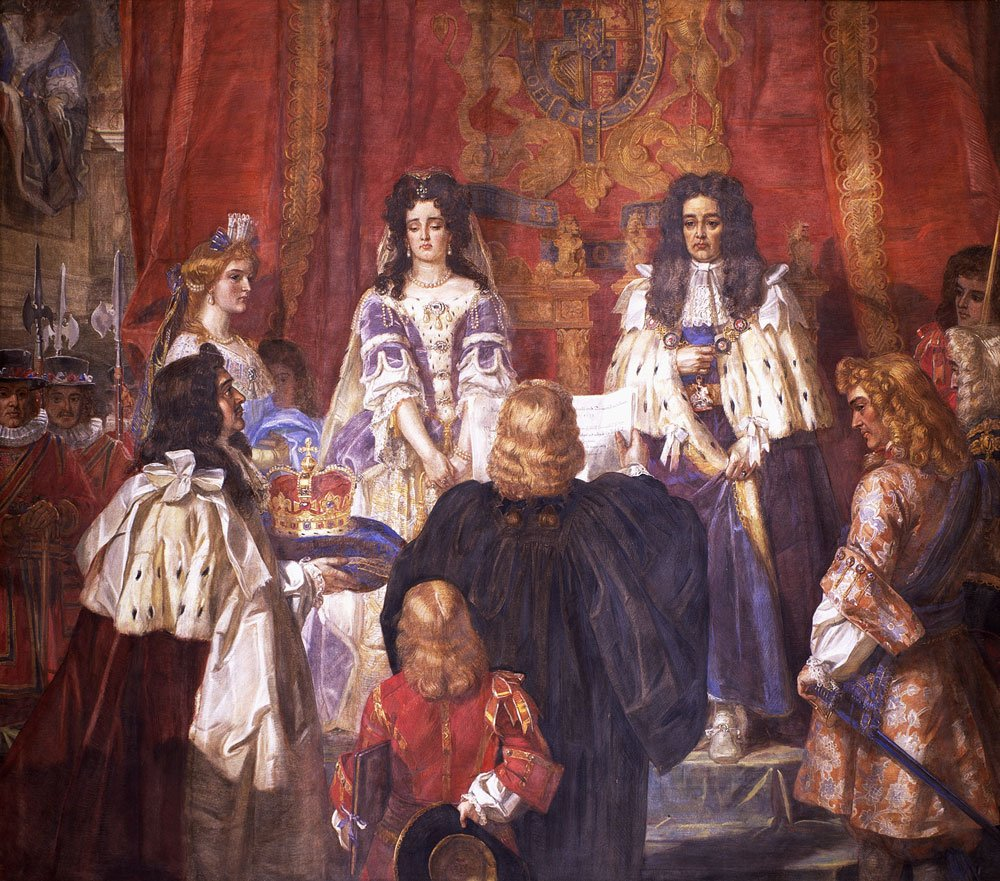
April 11: William III and Mary II are crowned in London as the joint rulers of England and Scotland.

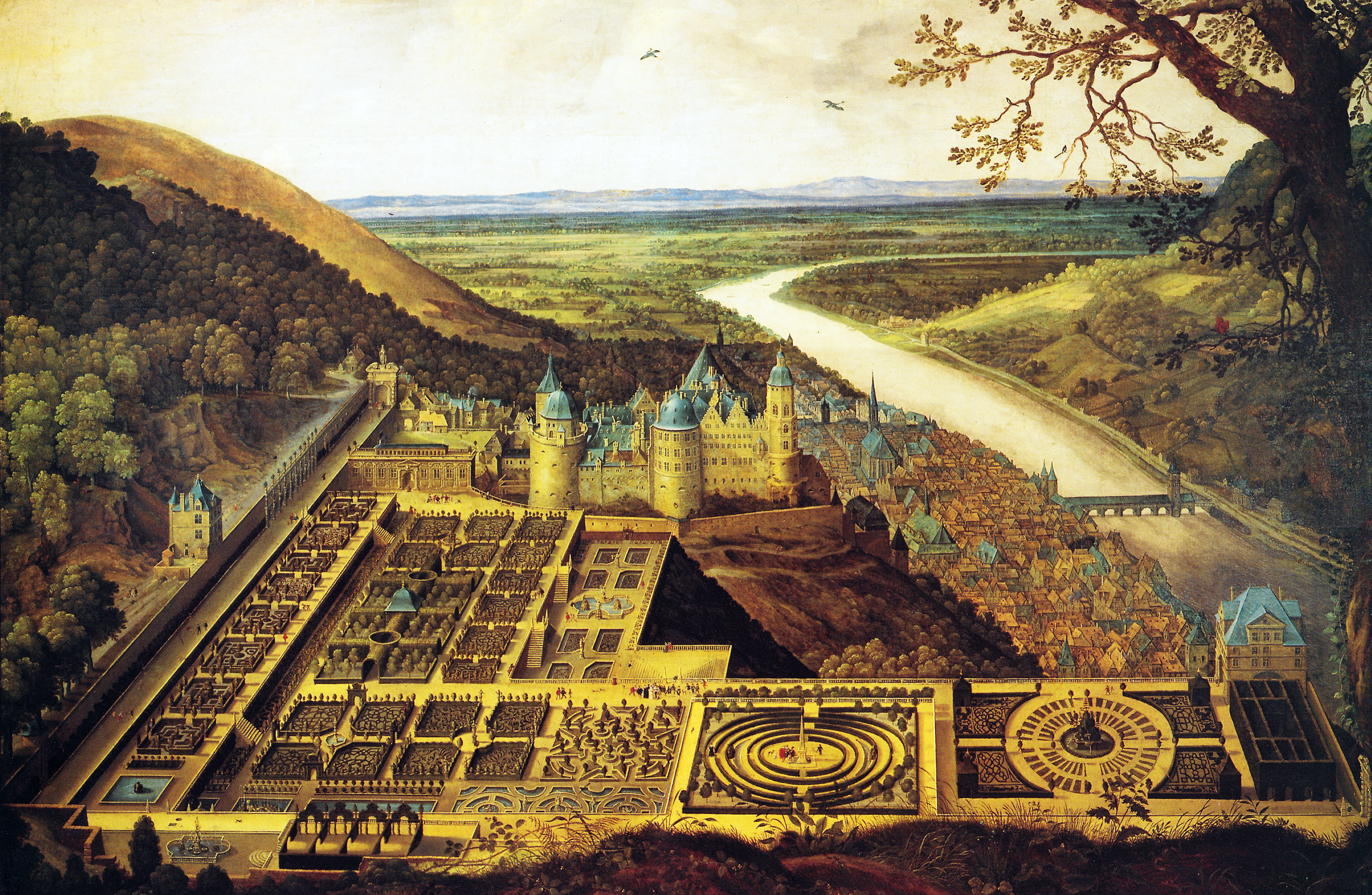
March 2: Heidelberg Castle is burned.

1689 (MDCLXXXIX) was a common year starting on Saturday of the Gregorian calendar and a common year starting on Tuesday of the Julian calendar, the 1689th year of the Common Era (CE) and Anno Domini (AD) designations, the 689th year of the 2nd millennium, the 89th year of the 17th century, and the 10th and last year of the 1680s decade. As of the start of 1689, the Gregorian calendar was 10 days ahead of the Julian calendar, which remained in localized use until 1923.

== Events ==
Notable events during this year include:

- Coup, war, and legislation in England and its territories.
  - The overthrow of Catholic king James of England, Ireland, and Scotland in the Glorious Revolution.
  - The latter realms entering the Nine Years War and its expansion to the American colonies in the King William's War.
  - The Bill of Rights becomes law in England.
- Japanese writer Bashō goes on a voyage, resulting in the classic Narrow Road to the Interior.
- The death of Pope Innocent XI and the election of the 241st Pope Alexander VIII.
- The Holy Roman Empire wins the Battle of Niš, fought against the Ottoman Empire.
- Morocco wins in the Siege of Larache against Spain.
- Peter the Great decrees the construction of the Great Siberian Road to China.

=== January–March ===
- January 22 (January 12, 1688 O.S.) – Glorious Revolution in England: The Convention Parliament is convened to determine if King James II of England, the last Roman Catholic British monarch, vacated the throne when he fled to France, at the end of 1688. The settlement of this is agreed on 8 February.
- January 30 – The first performance of the opera Henrico Leone composed by Agostino Steffani takes place in Hannover to inaugurate the new royal theatre in the Leineschloss.
- February 12 – John Locke returned to London from exile in Holland.
- February 23 (February 13, 1688 O.S.) – William III and Mary II are proclaimed co-rulers of England, Scotland and Ireland.
- March 2 – Nine Years' War: As French forces leave, they set fire to Heidelberg Castle, and the nearby town of Heidelberg.
- March 22 (March 12 O.S.) – Start of the Williamite War in Ireland: The deposed James II of England lands with 6,000 French soldiers in Ireland, where there is a Catholic majority, hoping to use it as the base for a counter-coup. However, many Irish Catholics see him as an agent of Louis XIV, and refuse to support him.
- March 27 – Japanese haiku master Bashō sets out on his last great voyage, which will result in the prose and verse classic Oku no Hosomichi ("Narrow Road to the Interior").

=== April–June ===
- April 4 – A total lunar eclipse is visible in central Asia.
- April 11 (O.S.) – William III and Mary II are crowned in London as King and Queen of England, Scotland, and Ireland. Ireland does not recognise them yet, while the Estates of Scotland declare King James VII deposed.
- April 18
  - Boston revolt: Unpopular New England Governor Sir Edmund Andros and other officials are overthrown by a "mob" of Bostonians. Andros, an appointee of James II of England, is disliked for his support of the Church of England and revocation of various colonial charters.
  - The Siege of Derry begins in Ireland as former King James II arrives at the gates of Derry and asks for its surrender during the Williamite War in Ireland. The Protestant defenders refuse and the siege lasts until August 1 when it is abandoned. .
- April 19 - A fire in Amalienborg-palace in Copenhagen kills 180 people.
- May 11 (May 1 O.S.)
  - The Battle of Bantry Bay begins during the Williamite War in Ireland as the French fleet under the Marquis de Châteaurenault is able to protect its transports, unloading supplies for James II, from the English Royal Navy under the Earl of Torrington, and withdraws unpursued.
  - William and Mary accept the Scottish throne a month after the Scottish Parliament votes to depose King James VII
- May 12 – Nine Years' War: With England and the Netherlands now both ruled by William III, they join the Grand Alliance (League of Augsburg), thus escalating the conflict, which continues until 1697. This is also the effective beginning of King William's War, the first of four North American Wars (until 1763) between English and French colonists, both sides allied to Native American tribes. The nature of the fighting is a series of raids on each other's settlements, across the Canadian and New England borders.
- May 24 – The Act of Toleration, drawn up by the Convention Parliament of England to protect Protestants but with Roman Catholics intentionally excluded, is passed; this effectively concludes the Glorious Revolution.
- May 25 – The last hearth tax is collected in England and Wales.
- May 31 – Leisler's Rebellion: Calvinist Jacob Leisler deposes lieutenant governor Francis Nicholson and assumes control of the Province of New York.
- June 5 – The Convention of Estates adjourns in Scotland after 11 weeks and its members form a new Scottish parliament.
- June 14 – The Duke of Gordon, a Scottish peer and Jacobite supporter, surrenders Edinburgh Castle to Protestant attackers after holding out for 20 days following the Glorious Revolution.
- June 27 ‐ Pennacook Indians launch raid on Dover, New Hampshire in one of the opening raids of King William's War in the New England Colonies.

=== July–September ===
- July 25 – The Council of Wales and the Marches is abolished.
- July 27 – First Jacobite rising: Battle of Killiecrankie near Pitlochry in Perthshire – Scottish Covenanter supporters of William III and Mary II (under Hugh Mackay) are defeated by Jacobite supporters of James II, but the latter's leader, John Graham, Viscount Dundee, is killed. Hand grenades are used in action.
- July 28 – English sailors break through a floating boom across the River Foyle, to end the siege of Derry after 105 days.
- August 2 – Boston Revolt: Edmund Andros, former governor of the Dominion of New England, escapes from Boston to Connecticut, but is recaptured.
- August 5 – Beaver Wars: Lachine massacre – A force of 1,500 Iroquois largely destroys the village of Lachine, New France.
- August 12 – Pope Innocent XI (Benedetto Odescalchi, b. 1611), Pope since 1676, dies. He played a major part in founding both the League of Augsburg, against Louis XIV, and the Holy League, against the Ottoman Empire.
- August 20 – A large Williamite force under Marshal Schomberg begins the siege of Carrickfergus in the north of Ireland, which surrenders on August 27.
- August 21 – First Jacobite rising: Battle of Dunkeld – Covenanters defeat the Jacobites in Scotland.
- August 23
  - Roman Catholic cardinals convene in Rome for a papal conclave to elect a successor to Pope Innocent XI. The conclave lasts until October 6.
  - Gravely ill, the Empress Xiaoyiren is proclaimed empress by her husband, China's Kangxi Emperor, after having been Imperial Noble Consort since 1682. She dies the next day.
- August 27 – China and Russia sign the Treaty of Nerchinsk.
- September 3–12 – Messengers from over 100 Baptist churches assemble in the City of London to discuss and endorse the 1677 document that will become known as the 1689 Baptist Confession of Faith.
- September 8 – The Siege of Mainz (in the modern-day Rheinland-Pfalz state of Germany), which had started on June 1, ends after almost three months, as French General Nicolas Chalon du Blé surrenders the walled city to the armies of Austria and the Dutch Republic.
- September 9 – King William brings England into a military alliance with the Holy Roman Empire in a fight against France in the Nine Years War.
- September 24 – The Holy Roman Empire wins the Battle of Niš, fought against the Ottoman Empire during the Great Turkish War in modern-day Serbia.
- September 28–29 – A total lunar eclipse is visible in eastern America, western Europe and west Africa.

=== October–December ===
- October 6 – The papal conclave in Rome unanimously elects Pietro Vito Ottoboni as the new Pope. Ottoboni takes the name Alexander VIII and succeeds Pope Innocent XI, to become the 241st pope, the first Venetian to hold the office in over 200 years.
- October 26 – Skopje fire of 1689 occurs, lasting for two days and burning much of the city.
- November 11 – The Siege of Larache in Morocco ends when the Spanish troops surrender to Mawlay Ismail and the Moroccan forces.
- November 22 – Peter the Great decrees the construction of the Great Siberian Road to China.
- December 10 – A great comet is visible from Pekin and sightings continue until December 24th, including many from Dutch ships near the equator.
- December 16 – The Bill of Rights (An Act Declaring the Rights and Liberties of the Subject and Settling the Succession of the Crown), drawn up by the Convention Parliament of England to establish constitutional monarchy in England, but with Roman Catholics barred from the throne, receives royal assent; it will remain substantially in force into the 21st century.
- December 22 – A serious earthquake strikes Innsbruck, Austria.

=== Date unknown ===
- Peter the Great plots to overthrow his half-sister Sophia as regent of Russia.
- Supporters of William of Orange seize Liverpool Castle in the north west of England.
- The English East India Company expands its influence, and a Committee of the House of Commons is formed to deal with the concerns of the Company.
- Valvasor's The Glory of the Duchy of Carniola is printed in Nuremberg.
- The first documented performance of the opera Dido and Aeneas by Henry Purcell takes place at Josias Priest's girls' school in Chelsea, London, with a libretto based on Virgil's Aeneid.
- Boston suffers a smallpox epidemic.

== Births ==
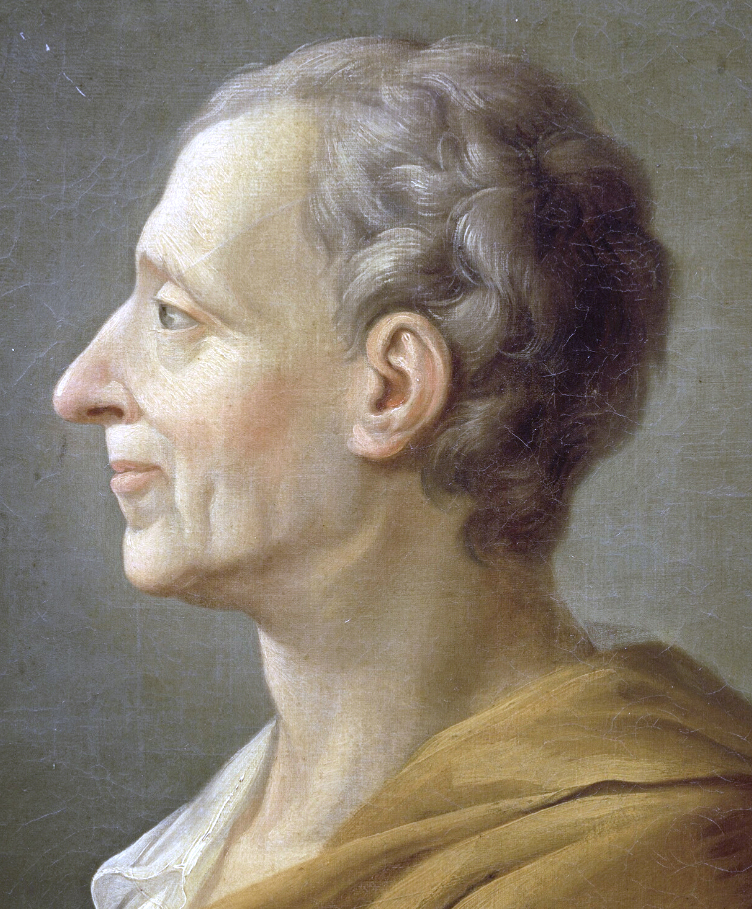
Montesquieu born 18 January

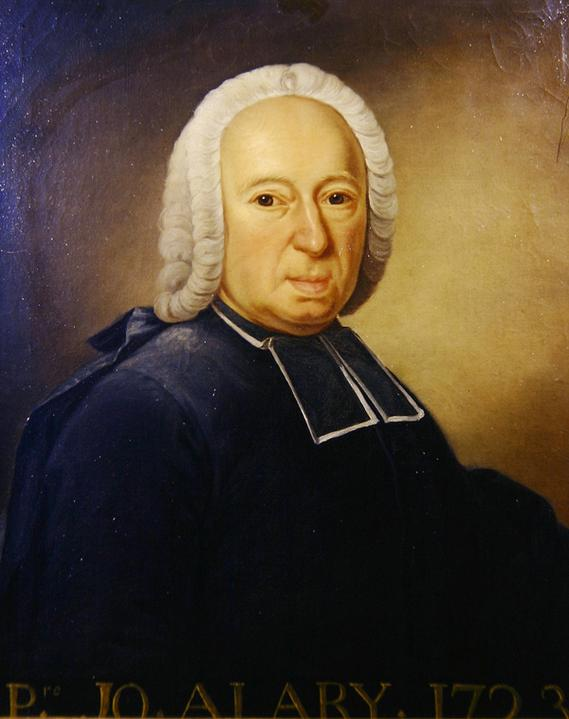
Pierre-Joseph Alary born 19 March

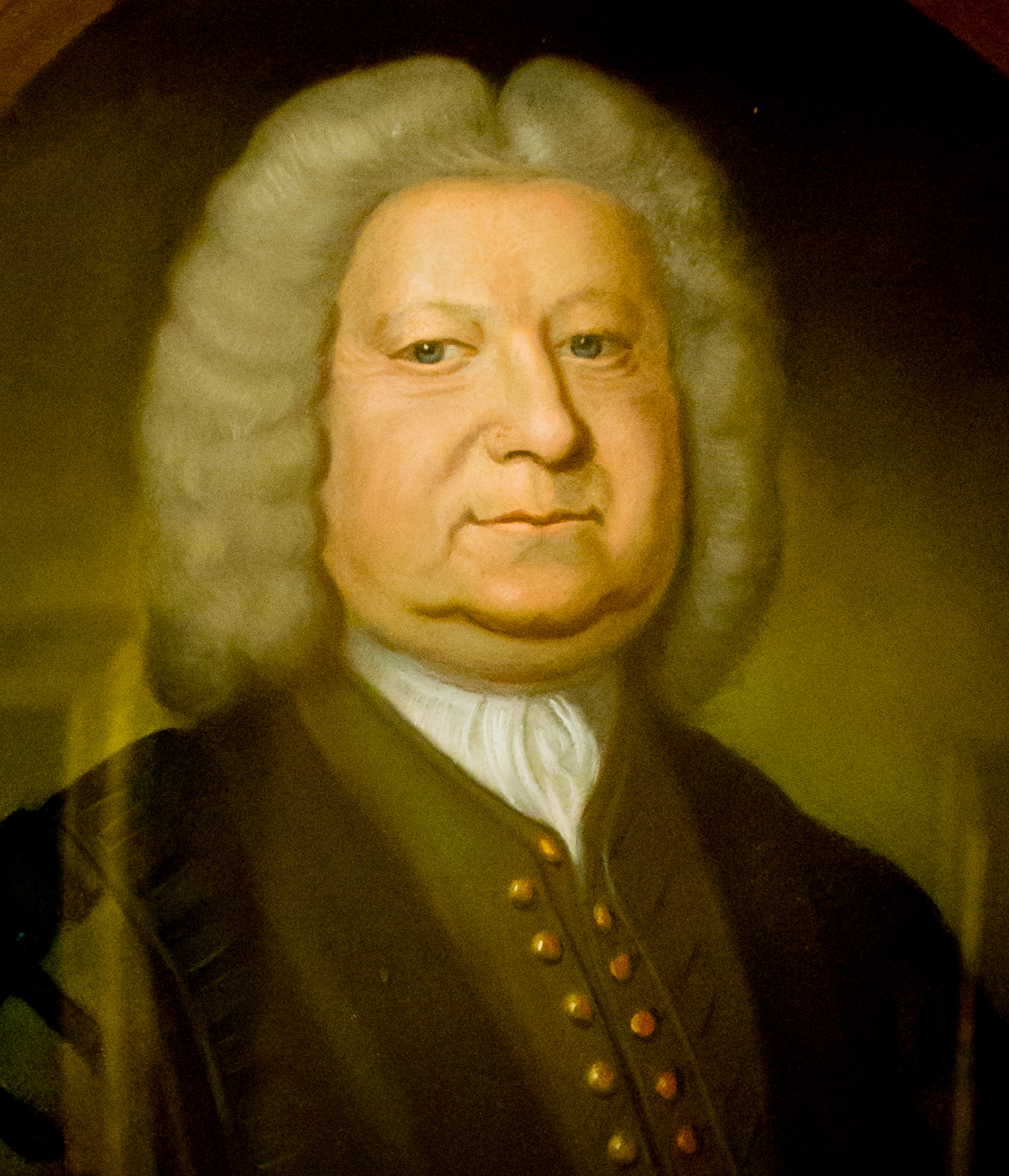
Richard Ward (governor) born 15 April

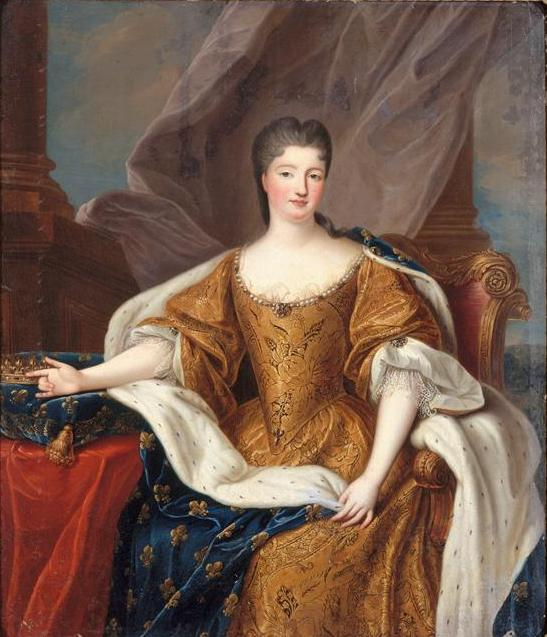
Marie Anne de Bourbon born 18 April

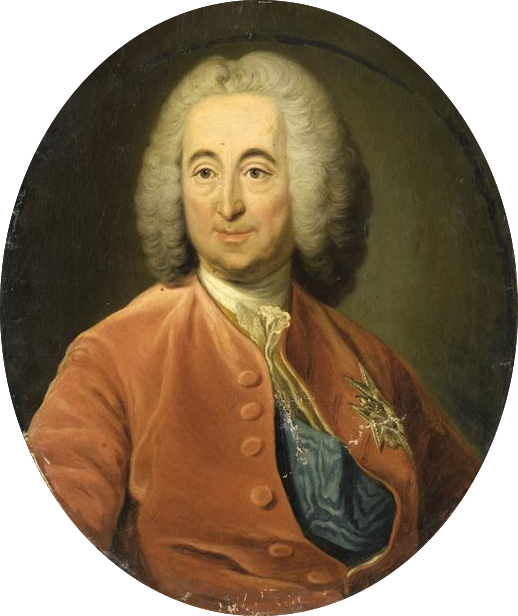
Antoine Louis Rouillé born 7 June

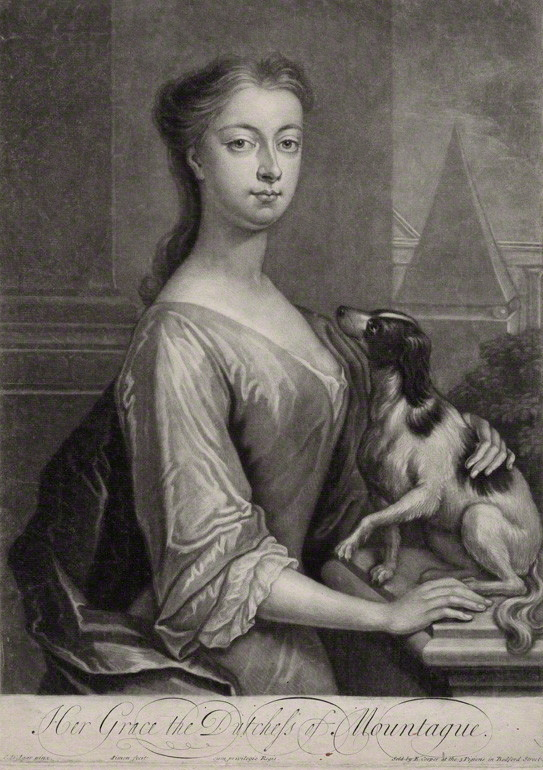
Mary Montagu, Duchess of Montagu born 15 July

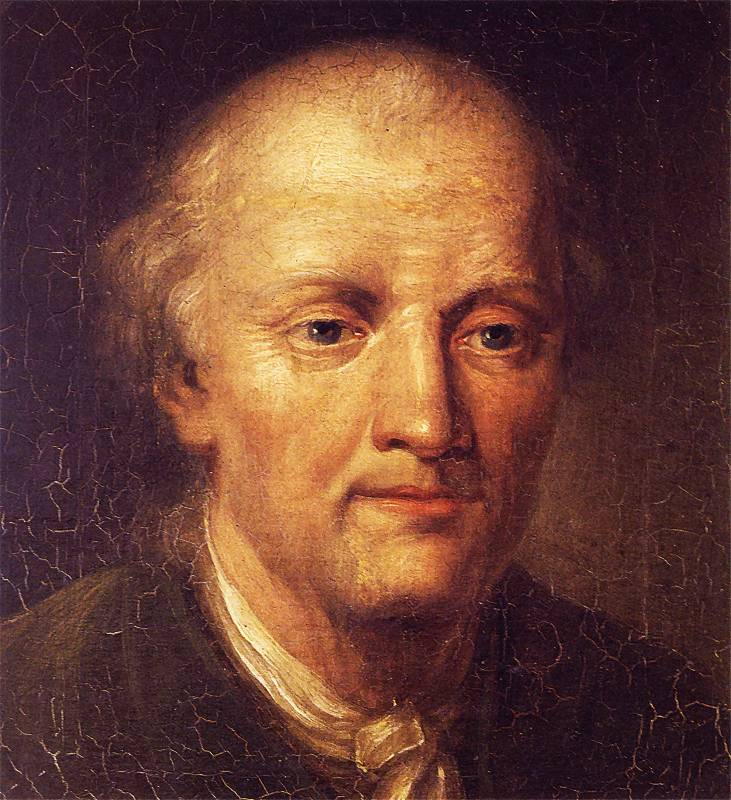
Szymon Czechowicz born 22 July

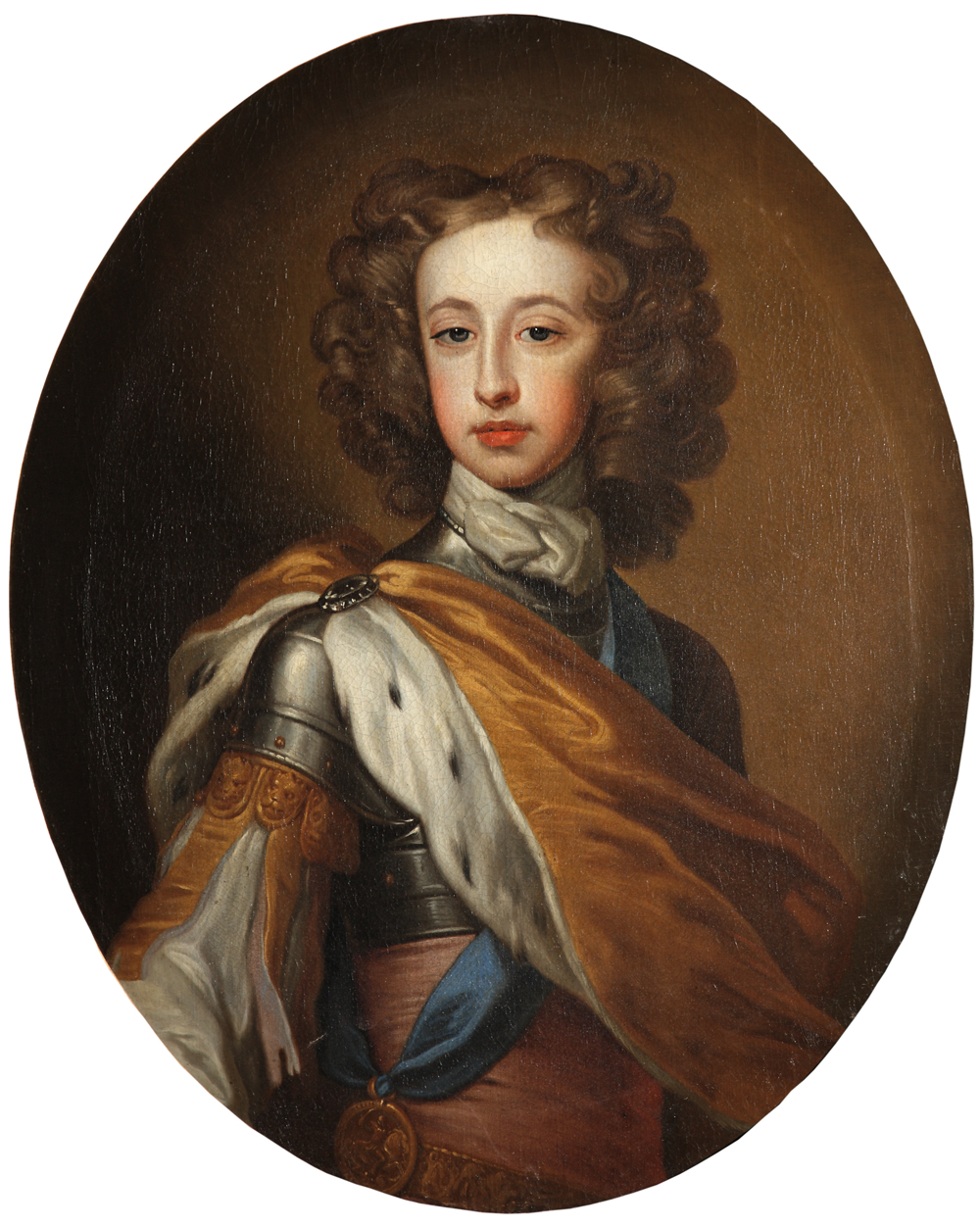
Prince William, Duke of Gloucester born 24 July

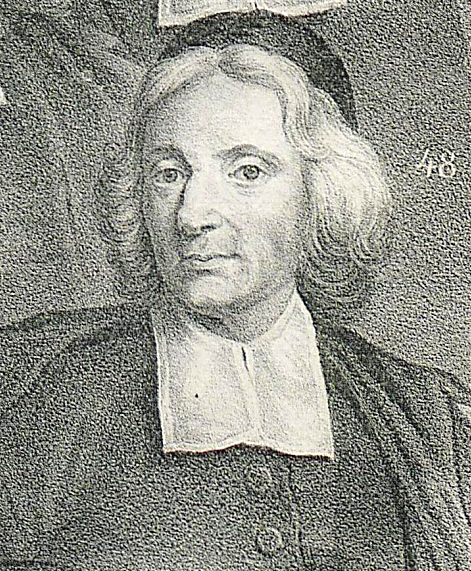
Henric Benzelius born 7 August

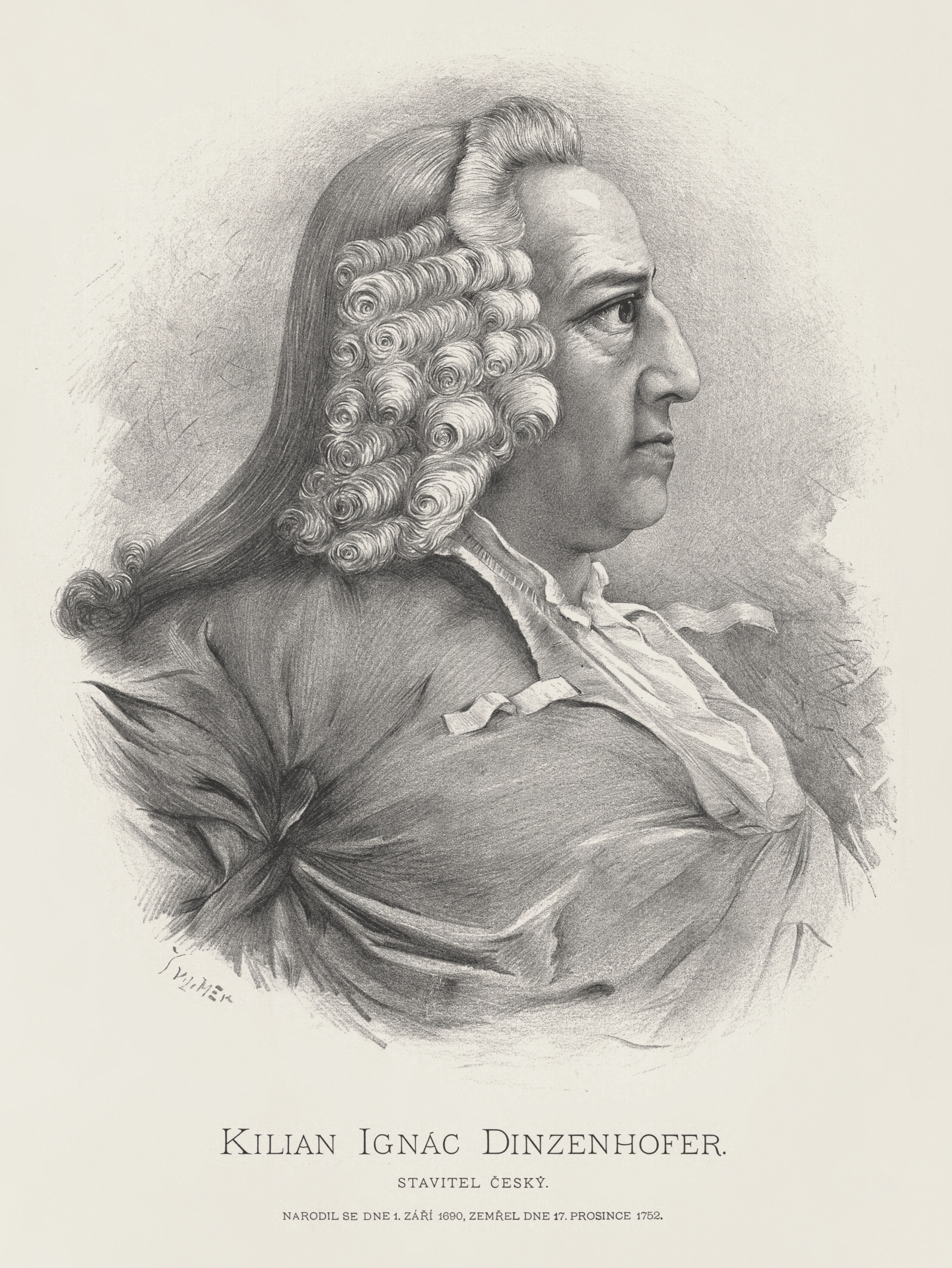
Kilian Ignaz Dientzenhofer born 1 September

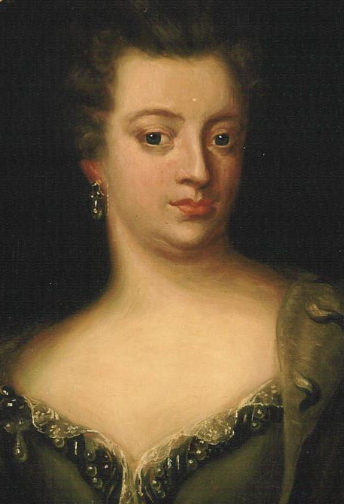
Anna Sophie Schack born 4 September

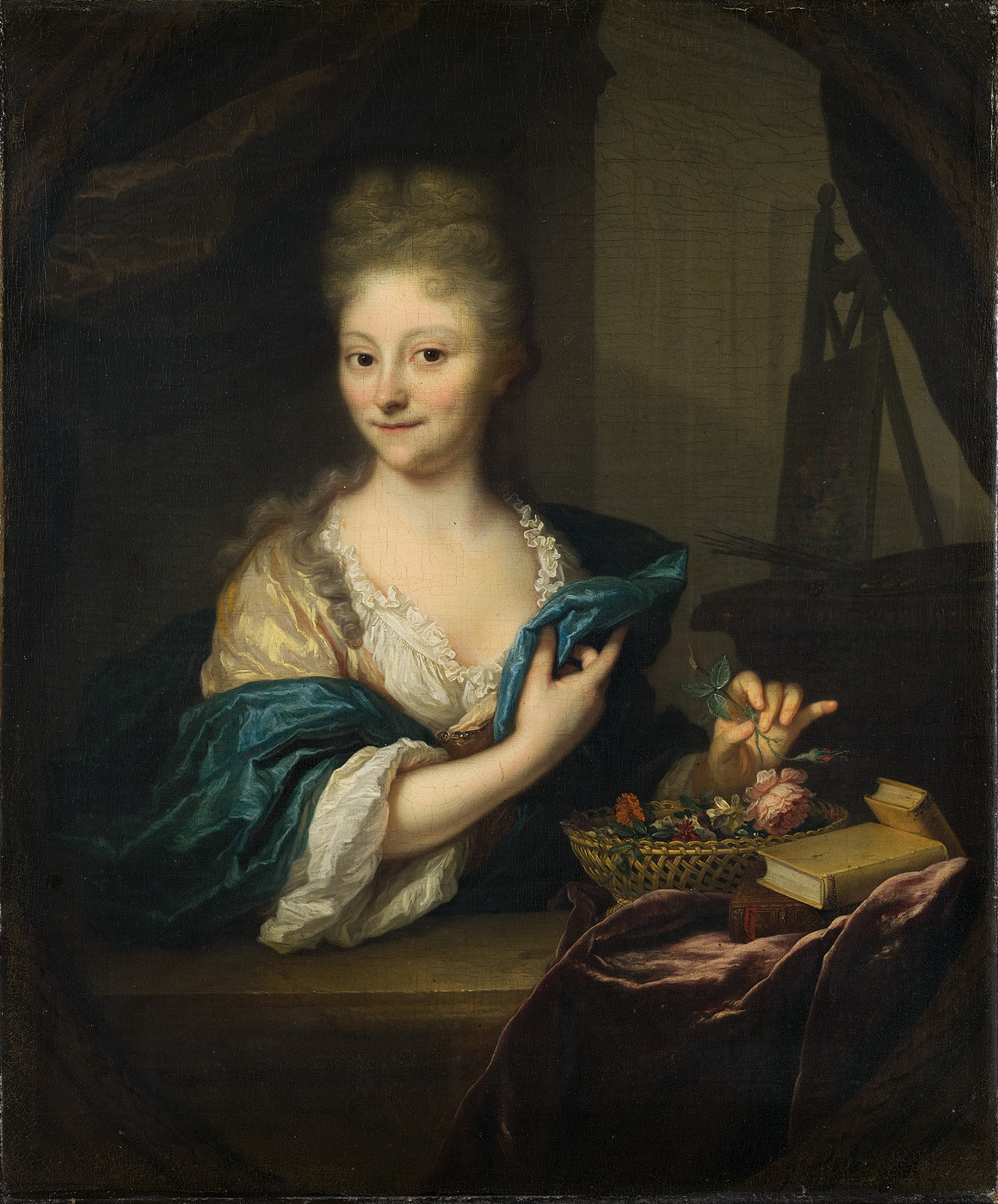
Catharina Backer born 22 September

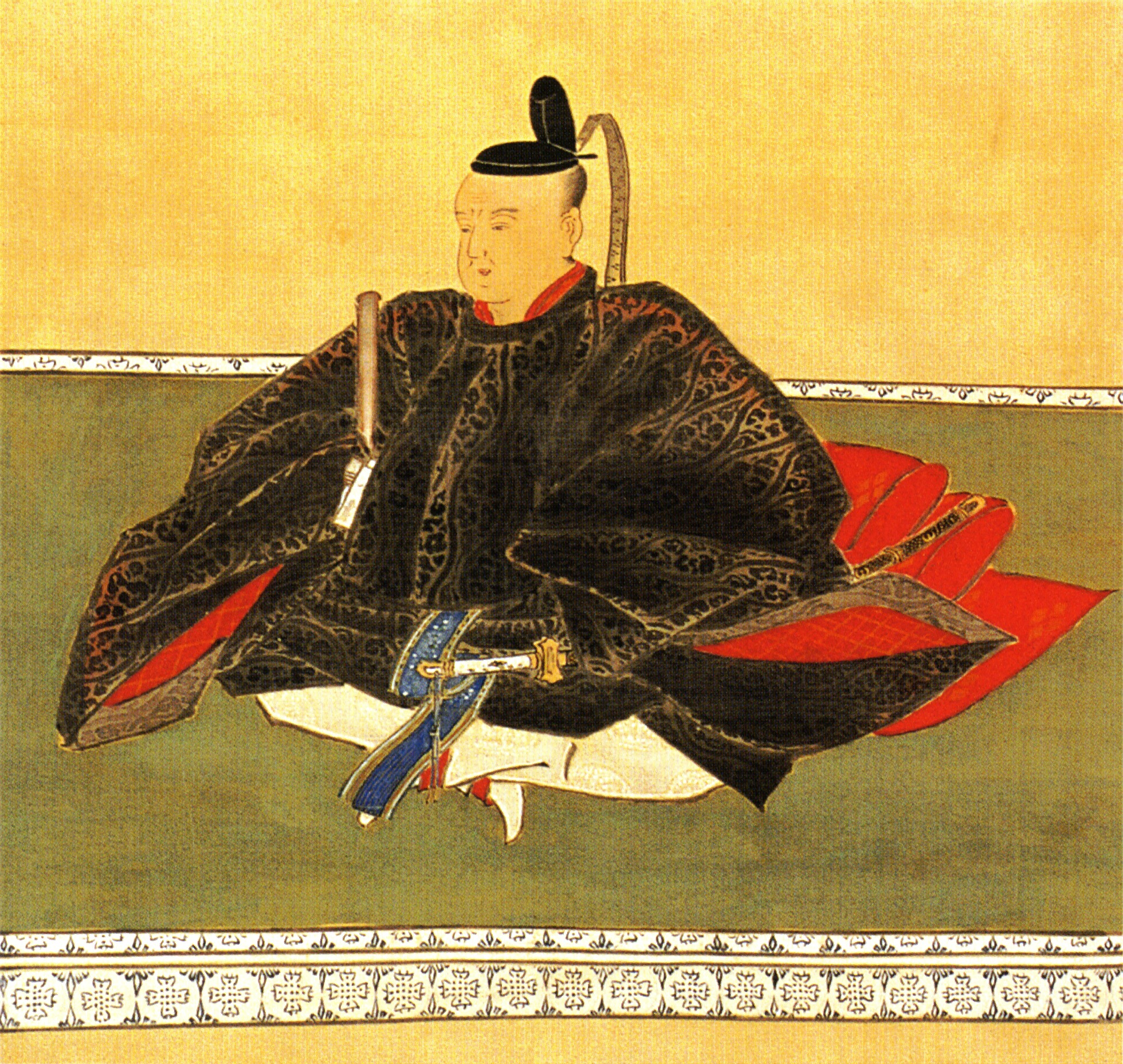
Nijō Yoshitada born 26 September

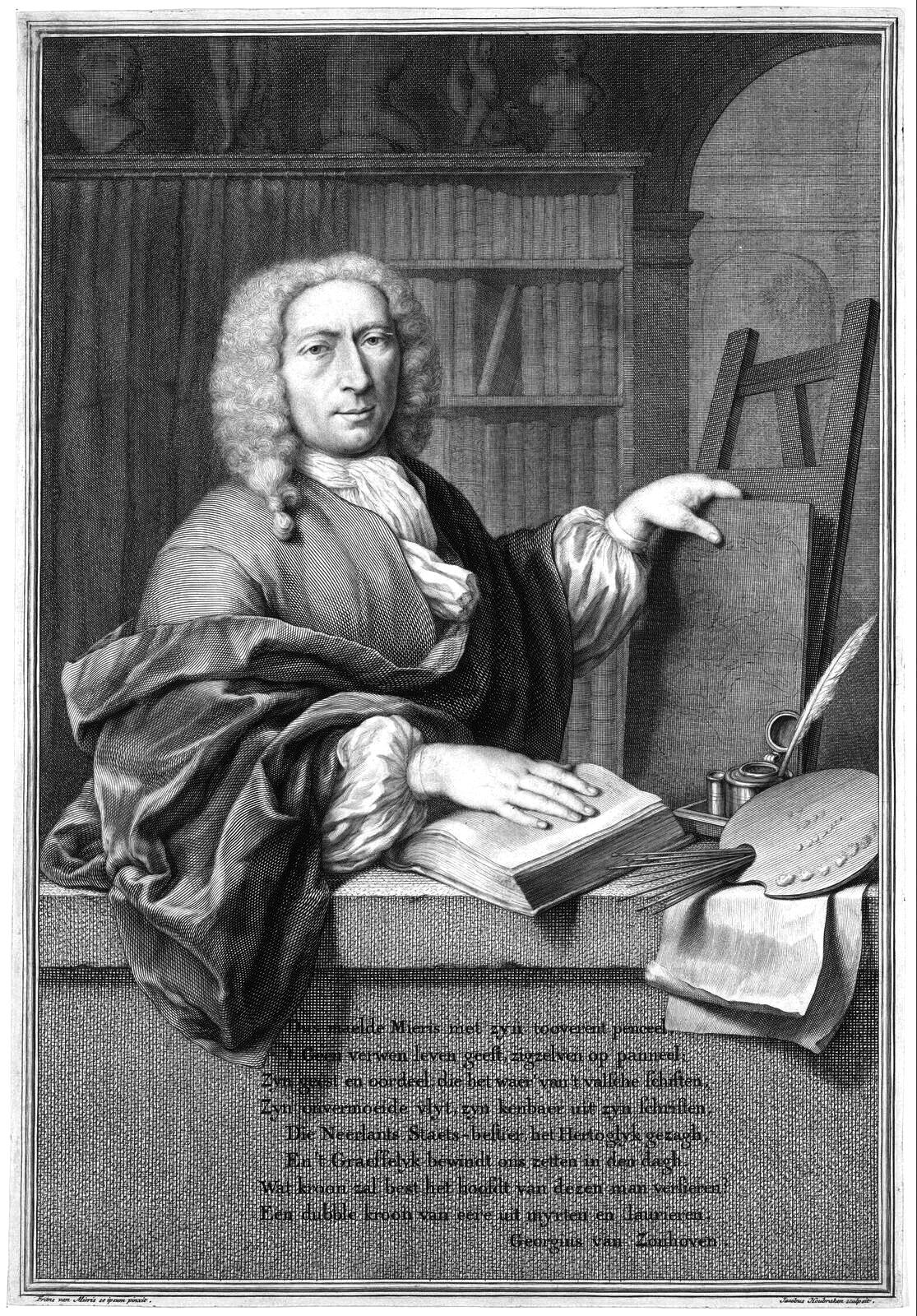
Frans van Mieris the Younger born 24 December

=== January ===
- January 7 – Robert Murray, Brigadier-General, Scottish soldier, Member of Parliament (d. 1738)
- January 11 – Charles Parkin, English clergyman and antiquarian (d. 1765)
- January 15 – Giovanni Gaetano Bottari, Italian scholar and critic (d. 1775)
- January 16 – Edmond Jean François Barbier, French historian (d. 1771)
- January 18
  - Montesquieu, French social commentator and political thinker (d. 1755)
  - Jan Abel Wassenbergh, painter from the Northern Netherlands (d. 1750)
- January 21 – Daniel Henchman, bookseller (d. 1761)
- January 22 – Philibert Orry, French politician (d. 1747)
- January 23 – Joseph Ames, English bibliographer and antiquary (d. 1759)
- January 24 – Gaspare Diziani, Italian painter (d. 1767)
- January 29 – James Rait, Bishop of Brechin (d. 1777)

=== February ===
- February 1 – Thomas Jenner, English academic (d. 1768)
- February 3 – Blas de Lezo, admiral of the Spanish Empire (d. 1741)
- February 23 – Leonardo Antonio Olivieri, Italian painter (d. 1752)
- c. February 23 – Samuel Bellamy, English pirate captain (d. 1717)
- February 27
  - Pietro Gnocchi, Italian composer (d. 1775)
  - John Roosevelt, American businessman and alderman (d. 1750)
  - Maximilian Emanuel of Württemberg-Winnental, German noble (d. 1709)

=== March ===
- March 3 – Thomas Ingoldsby, British politician (d. 1768)
- March 3 – Mattias Alexander von Ungern-Sternberg, Swedish politician and field marshal (d. 1763)
- March 7 – Charles-Michel Mesaiger, Jesuit priest (d. 1766)
- March 11
  - Roger Handasyd, British Army officer (d. 1763)
  - Nanbu Toshimoto, mid-Edo period Japanese samurai, the 6th daimyō of Morioka Domain (d. 1725)
- March 19 – Pierre-Joseph Alary, French ecclesiastic and writer (d. 1770)
- March 20 – Thomas Robie, Colonial American scientist and physician (d. 1729)
- March 25 – Peder Hersleb, Norwegian bishop (d. 1757)
- March 26 – Archduchess Maria Magdalena of Austria, Austrian Royal (d. 1743)

=== April ===
- April 2 – Arthur Dobbs, Irish politician, governor of the Province of North Carolina (d. 1765)
- April 5 – William Holmes, English academic and Dean of Exeter (d. 1748)
- April 14 – William Murray, Marquess of Tullibardine, Scottish army officer and Jacobite leader (d. 1746)
- April 15 – Richard Ward, American colonial governor (d. 1763)
- April 18 – Marie Anne de Bourbon, French noble (d. 1720)
- April 21 – Johann Jakob Fried, German obstetrician (d. 1769)
- April 24 – Giovanni Antonio Faldoni, Italian painter and engraver (d. 1770)
- April 30 – Jean-Jacques Amelot de Chaillou, French politician (d. 1749)

=== May ===
- May 1 – Martha Fowke, English poet (d. 1736)
- May 2 – Franz de Paula Ferg, Austrian painter (d. 1740)
- May 5 – John Tufts, American minister and music educator (d. 1750)
- May 10 – José Manso de Velasco, 1st Count of Superunda, Royal Governor of Chile (d. 1767)
- May 11 – Heinrich Karl Ludwig de Herault, Prussian Army general (d. 1757)
- May 15 – Lady Mary Wortley Montagu, writer and poet from England (d. 1762)
- May 16 – Samuel Adams Sr., American brewer (d. 1748)
- May 21 – André-François Deslandes, French philosopher (d. 1757)
- May 24 – Daniel Finch, 8th Earl of Winchilsea, British politician (d. 1769)
- May 27 – Andreas Jakob von Dietrichstein, Archbishop of Salzburg (d. 1753)
- May 28 – Maximilian of Hesse-Kassel, German prince (d. 1753)
- May 29 – Louis de Gramont, 6th Duke of Gramont, French general (d. 1745)

=== June ===
- June 1 – Henri François, comte de Ségur, French general (d. 1751)
- June 2 – Edward Harley, 2nd Earl of Oxford and Earl Mortimer, British politician, bibliophile, collector and patron of the arts (d. 1741)
- June 6 – Algernon Coote, 6th Earl of Mountrath, Irish politician (d. 1744)
- June 7 – Antoine Louis Rouillé, French noble (d. 1761)
- June 12 – Sir Richard Grosvenor, 4th Baronet, British politician; (d. 1732)
- June 19 – Montague Blundell, 1st Viscount Blundell, Irish Viscount (d. 1756)
- June 23 – George Hay, 8th Earl of Kinnoull, British diplomat (d. 1758)
- June 24 – Giovanni Casini, Portrait painter and sculptor (d. 1748)
- June 26
  - Edward Holyoke, American academic administrator, 9th president of Harvard (d. 1769)
  - James Radclyffe, 3rd Earl of Derwentwater, English noble (d. 1716)

=== July ===
- July 6 – Johann Friedrich Karl von Ostein, Roman Catholic archbishop (d. 1763)
- July 9 – Alexis Piron, French writer (d. 1773)
- July 14 – Antoine Gaubil, French missionary (d. 1759)
- July 15 – Mary Montagu, Duchess of Montagu (d. 1751)
- July 16 – Samuel Molyneux, Irish politician (d. 1728)
- July 17 – Christian, Landgrave of Hesse-Wanfried-Rheinfels (d. 1755)
- July 21 – John Quincy, American soldier and politician (d. 1767)
- July 22 – Szymon Czechowicz, Polish artist (d. 1775)
- July 24 – Prince William, Duke of Gloucester, son of Queen Anne (d. 1700)
- July 26 – Maria Anna Josepha Althann, Spanish noble (d. 1755)

=== August ===
- August 1 – Pedro de Calatayud, writer (d. 1773)
- August 3 – Ladislas Ignace de Bercheny, Marshal of France (d. 1778)
- August 4 – James Cotter the Younger, Leader of the Catholics of Cork (d. 1720)
- August 7 – Henric Benzelius, Swedish archbishop (d. 1758)
- August 8 – Wenzel Lorenz Reiner, Czech painter (d. 1743)
- August 19 – Samuel Richardson, English writer and printer (d. 1761)
- August 21 – Josep Prades i Gallent, Organist and composer (d. 1757)

=== September ===
- September 1
  - Kilian Ignaz Dientzenhofer, Czech architect (d. 1751)
  - Philipp Segesser, Swiss missionary (d. 1762)
- September 4
  - Hugh Bethell, British Member of Parliament (d. 1747)
  - Thomas Lawrence, American mayor (d. 1754)
  - Anna Sophie Schack, Danish noblewoman (d. 1760)
- September 13 – Johan Fredrik Peringskiöld, Swedish translator (d. 1725)
- September 17 – Ferdinand Charles, comte d'Aspremont-Lynden, army general (d. 1772)
- September 18 – Gabriel Malagrida, Italian missionary (d. 1761)
- September 21 – Jan Klemens Branicki, Polish noble (d. 1771)
- September 22 – Catharina Backer, painter from the Northern Netherlands (d. 1766)
- September 23 – Antonio Denzio, Italian opera singer (d. 1763)
- September 24 – Johann Adam Steinmetz, German pastor (d. 1762)
- September 26 – Nijō Yoshitada, Japanese noble (d. 1737)
- September 27 – Edward Stanley, 11th Earl of Derby, English noble and politician (d. 1776)
- September 29 – Henry Perrot, British Member of Parliament (d. 1740)
- September 30 – Jacques Aubert, French composer and violinist (d. 1753)

=== October ===
- October 10 – Francesco Maria Pratilli, Italian priest, antiquarian, famed for skilled forgeries (d. 1763)
- October 15 – Nicolas-Ignace de Beaubois, French missionary (d. 1770)
- October 22
  - King John V of Portugal, Portuguese king (d. 1750)
  - Matthew Skinner, English serjeant-at-law, judge and politician (d. 1749)
- October 29 – Tokugawa Yoshimichi, daimyo (d. 1713)
- October 31 – Mildmay Fane, British politician (d. 1715)

=== November ===
- November 2
  - Michael Cox, Anglican archbishop in Ireland (d. 1779)
  - Charles-François Panard, French chansonnier and poet (d. 1765)
  - Joan Paul Schaghen, Dutch governor (d. 1746)
- November 3
  - Jan Josef Ignác Brentner, Czech composer (d. 1742)
  - John Crowley, British Member of Parliament (d. 1728)
- November 4 – Luís Carlos Inácio Xavier de Meneses, 1st Marquis of Louriçal, Portuguese nobleman and statesman (d. 1742)
- November 6
  - Reynolds Calthorpe, politician (d. 1714)
  - Christoph Schütz, German theologian (d. 1750)
- November 8 – Henry XXXV, Prince of Schwarzburg-Sondershausen (d. 1758)
- November 17 – Jean François Foppens, Flemish historian (d. 1761)
- November 21 – Jacques I, Prince of Monaco, Prince consort of Monaco (d. 1751)
- November 29 – Johann Theodor Eller, German chemist and physician (d. 1760)
- November 30
  - Lars Gathenhielm, Swedish privateer (d. 1718)
  - Joseph Wamps, French painter (d. 1744)

=== December ===
- December 1 – Hieronymus Albrecht Hass, harpsichord maker (d. 1752)
- December 4 – Gottfried Lengnich, historian and politician (d. 1774)
- December 8 – Albert Wolfgang of Brandenburg-Bayreuth, Titular margrave of Brandenburg, imperial general (d. 1734)
- December 11 – Ignatius van der Beken, Flemish painter (d. 1774)
- December 14 – Agostino Veracini, Italian painter (d. 1762)
- December 21 – Arthur Ingram, 6th Viscount of Irvine, British peer and politician (d. 1736)
- December 23 – Joseph Bodin de Boismortier, French composer (d. 1755)
- December 24 – Frans van Mieris the Younger, Dutch painter (d. 1763)
- December 27 – Jacob August Franckenstein, Encyclopedia editor, professor (d. 1733)

== Deaths ==
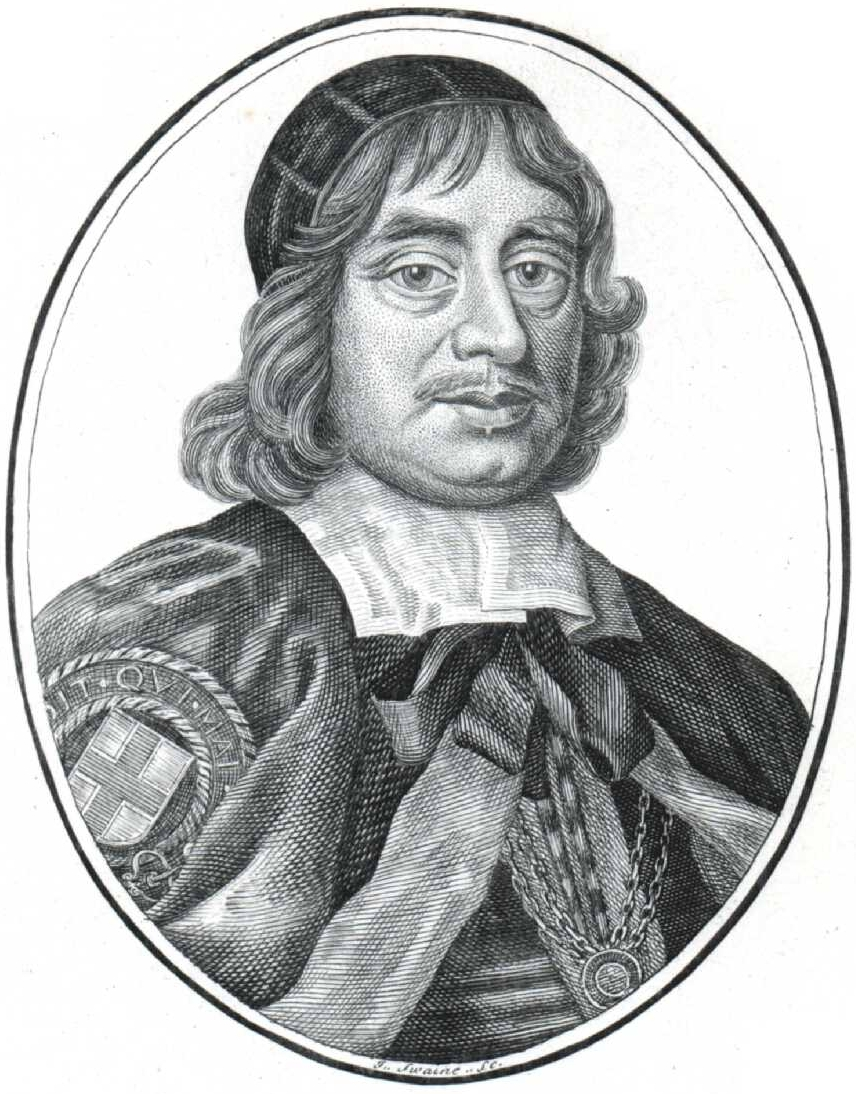
Seth Ward (bishop of Salisbury) died 6 January

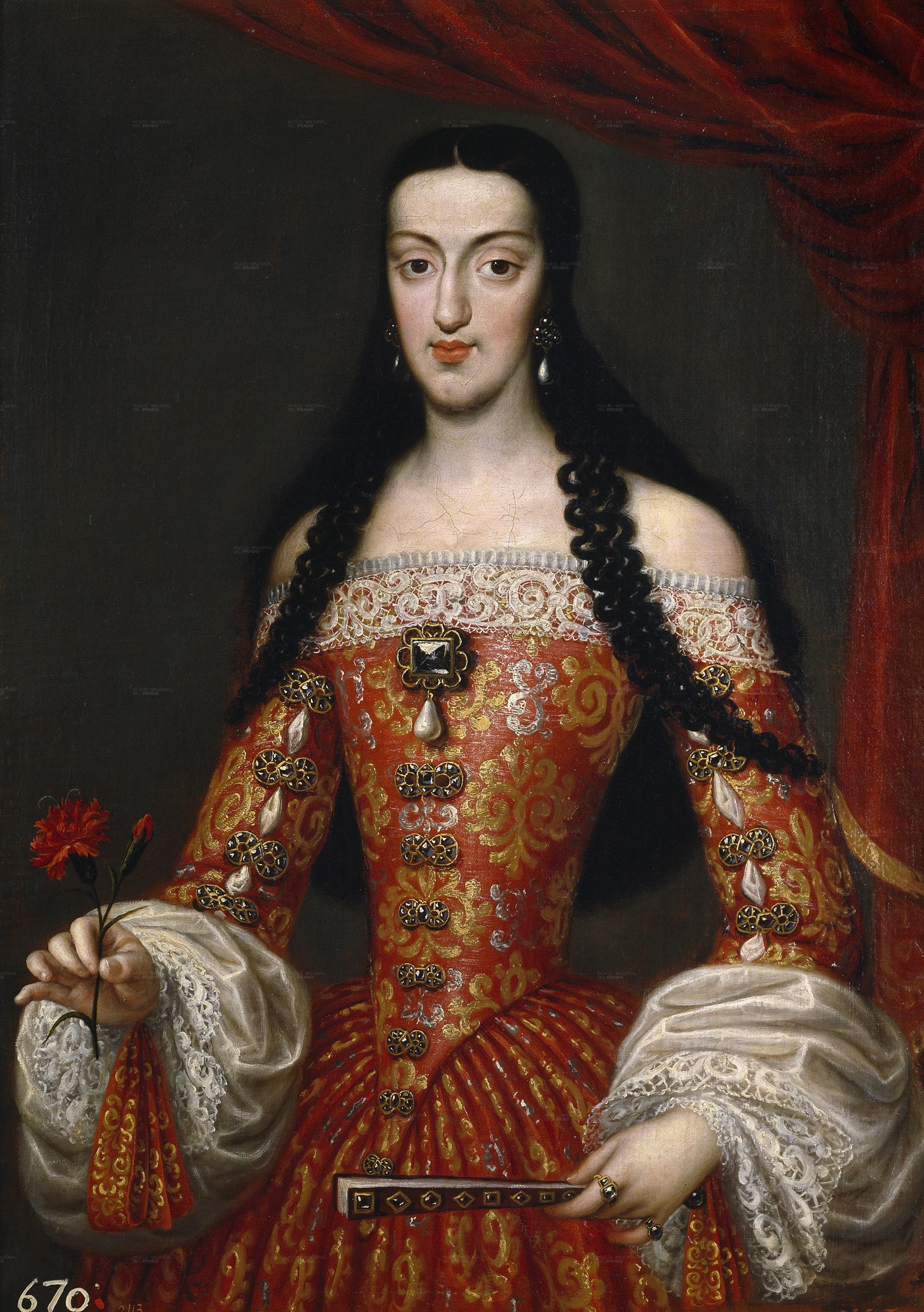
Marie Louise d'Orléans died 12 February

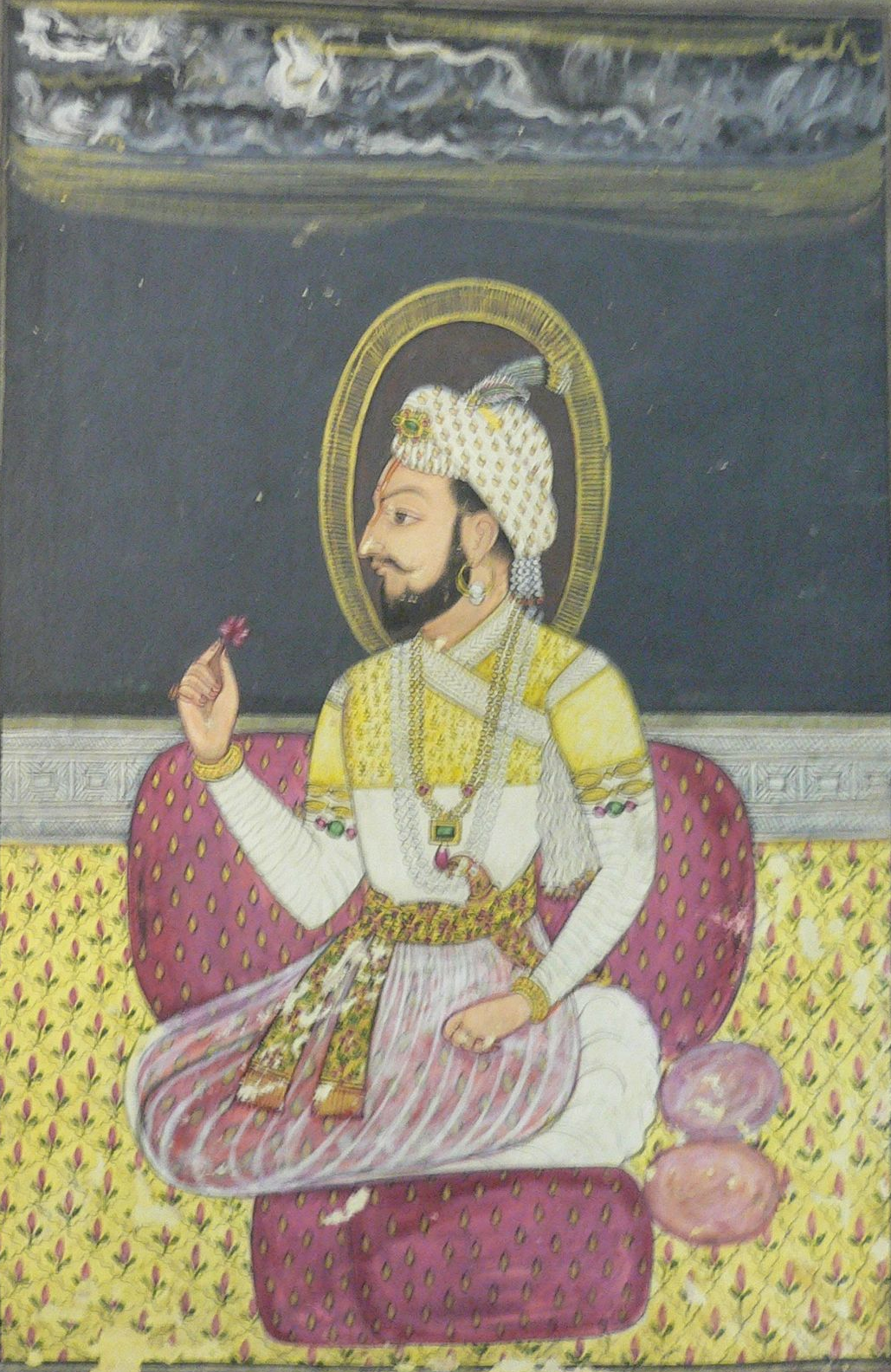
Sambhaji died 11 March

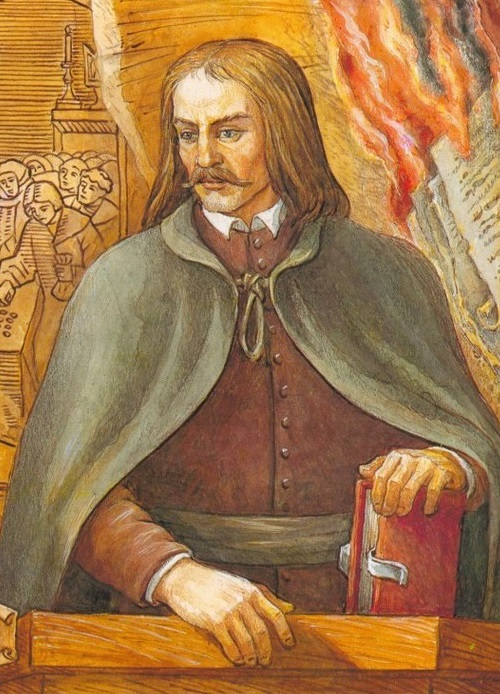
Kazimierz Łyszczyński died 30 March

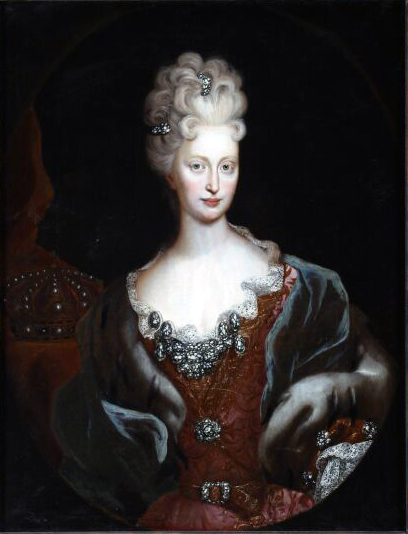
Archduchess Maria Anna Josepha of Austria died 4 April

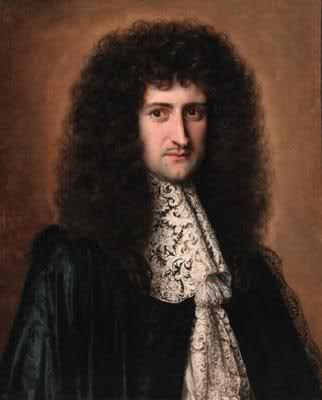
Lorenzo Onofrio Colonna died 14 April

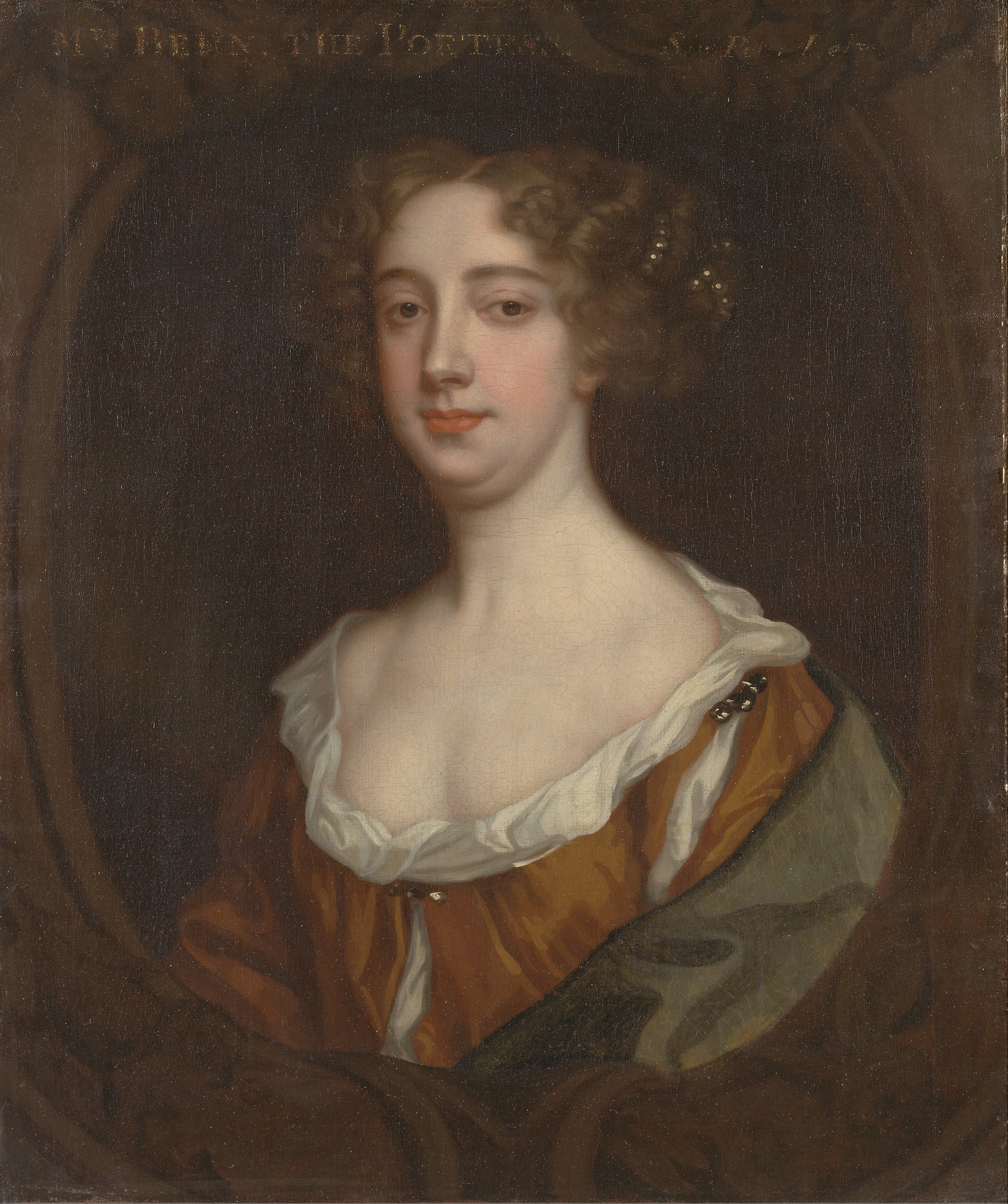
Aphra Behn died 16 April

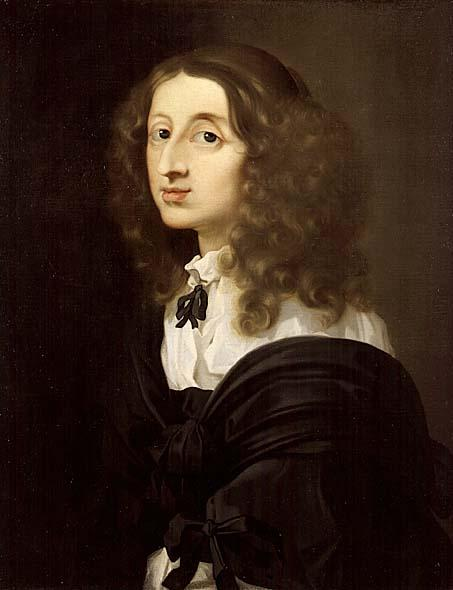
Christina, Queen of Sweden died 19 April

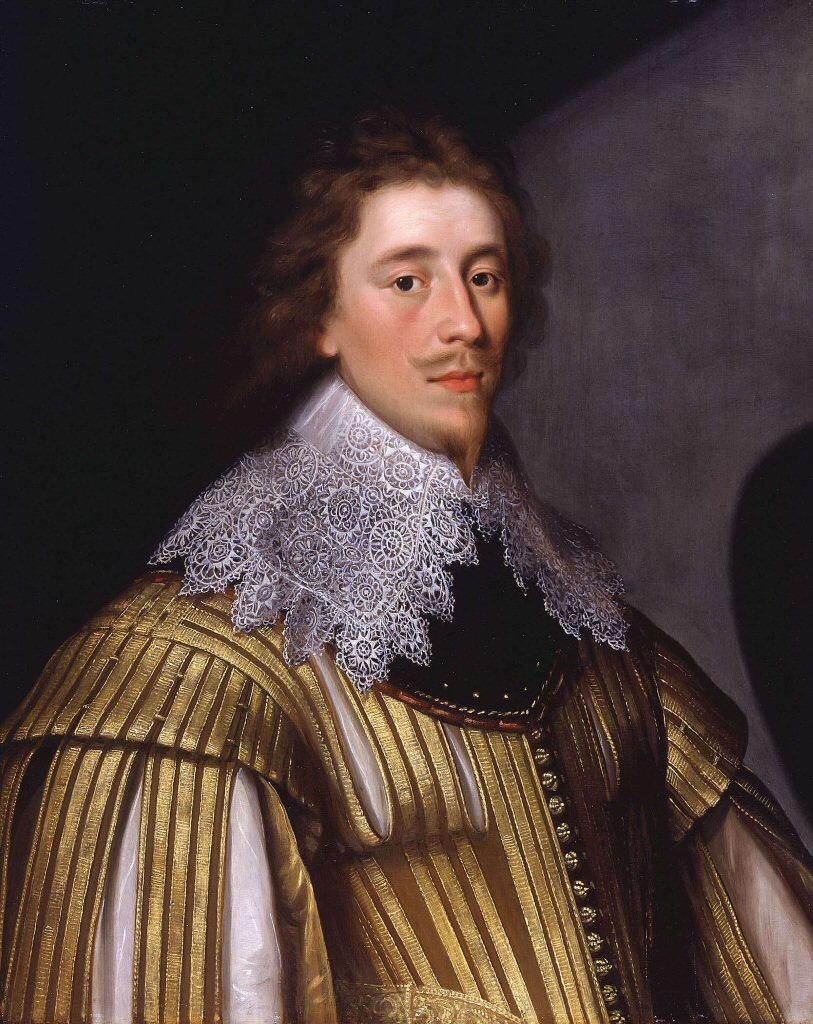
Conyers Darcy, 1st Earl of Holderness died 14 June

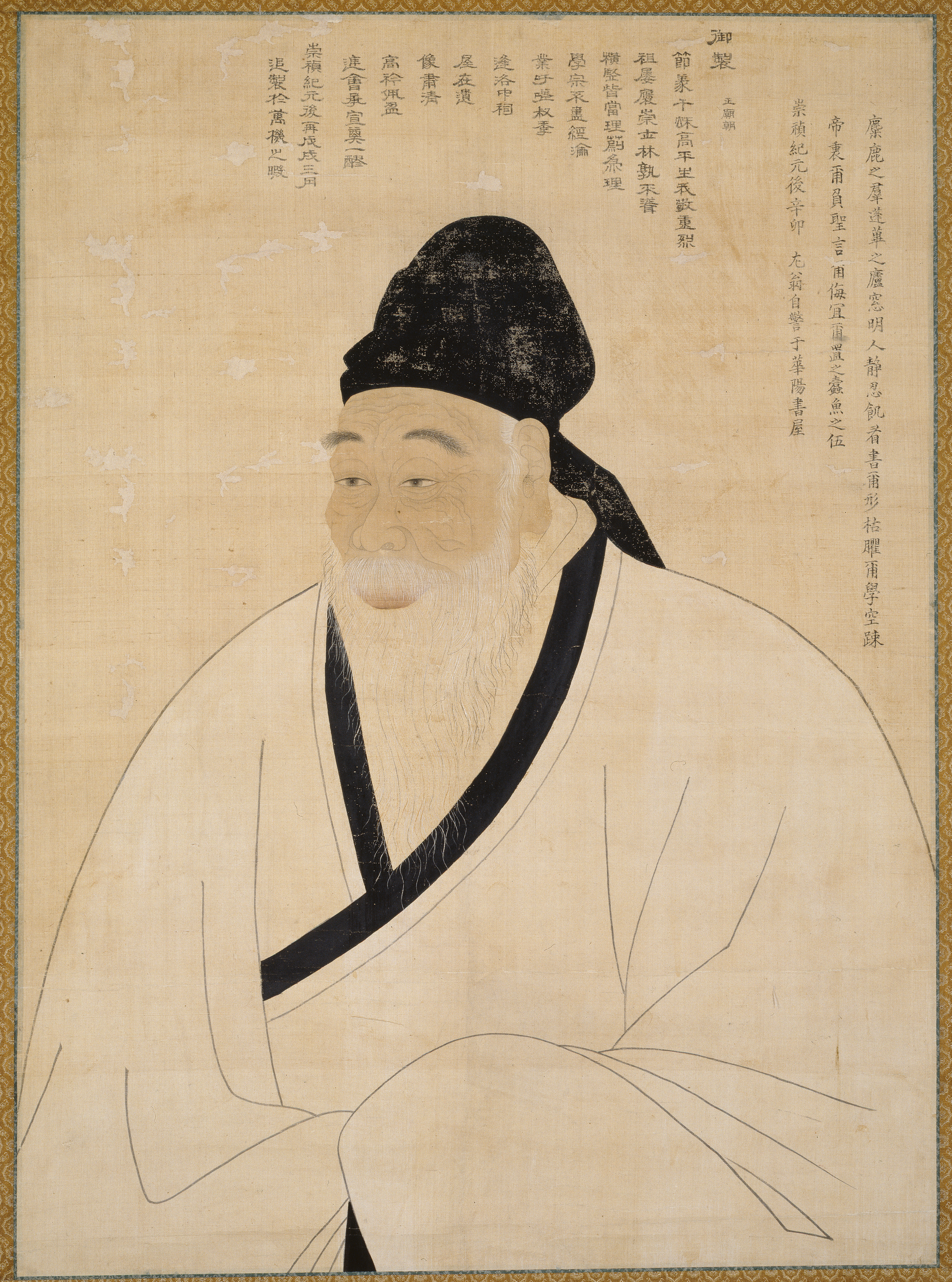
Song Si-yeol died 19 July

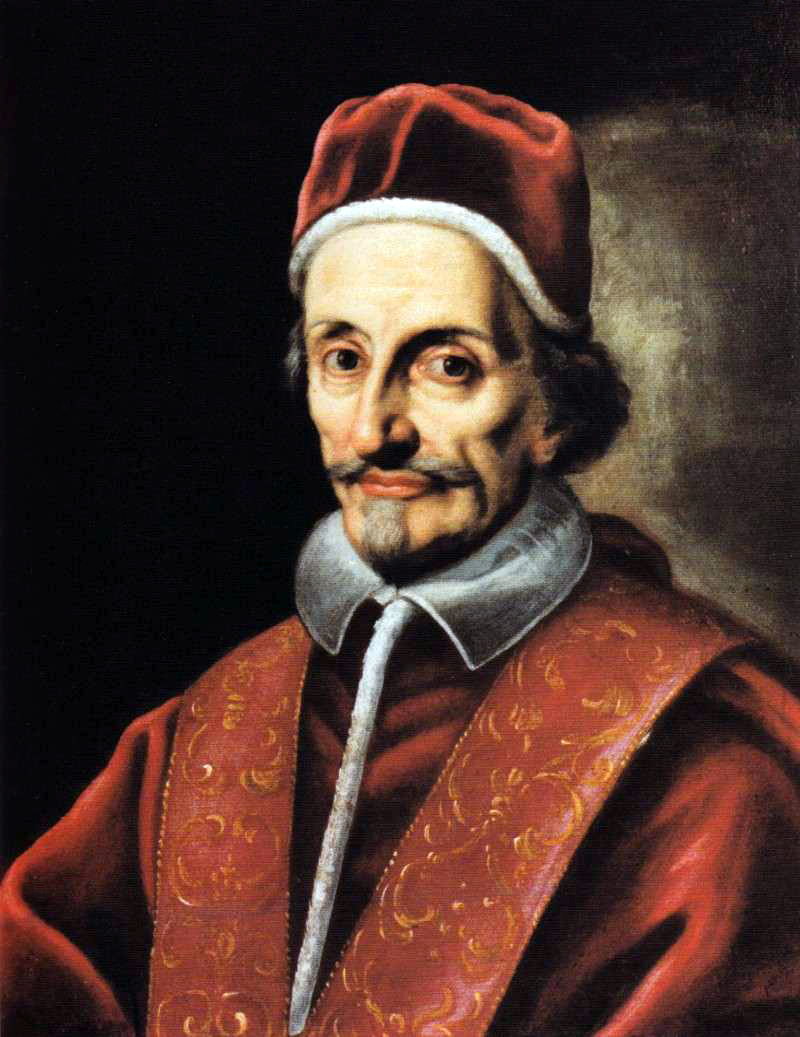
Pope Innocent XI died 12 August

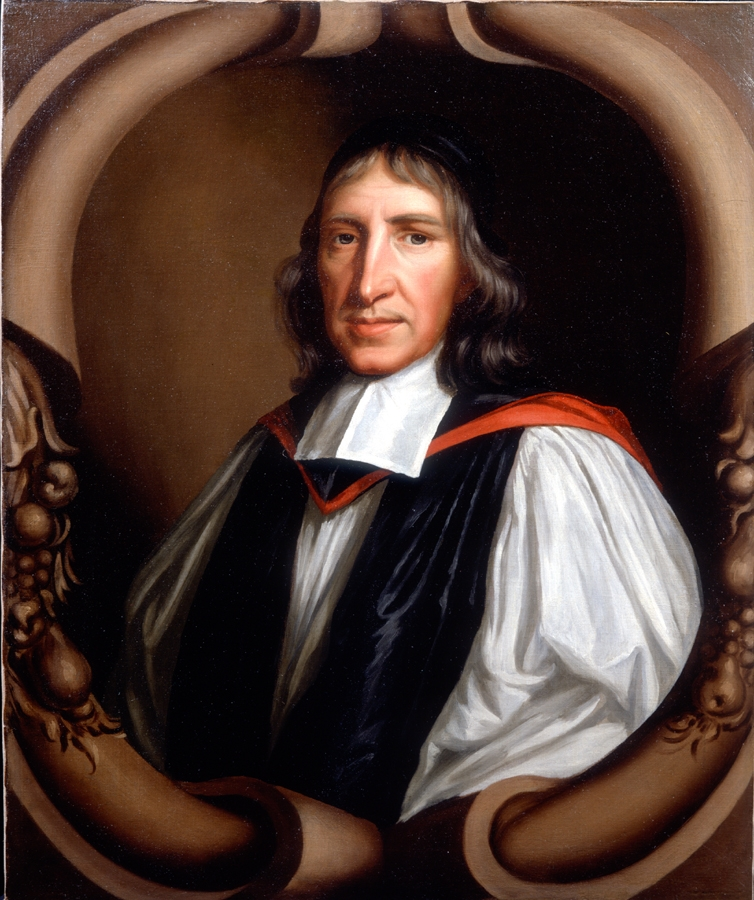
John Lake (bishop) died 30 August

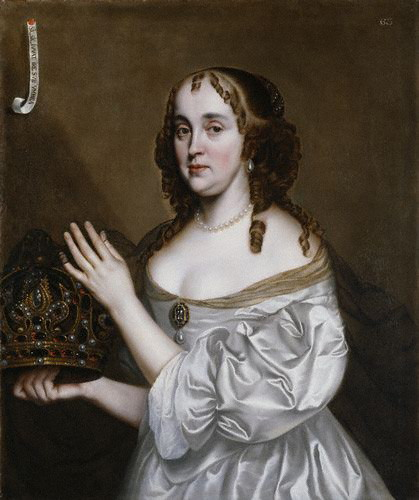
Jane Lane, Lady Fisher died 9 September

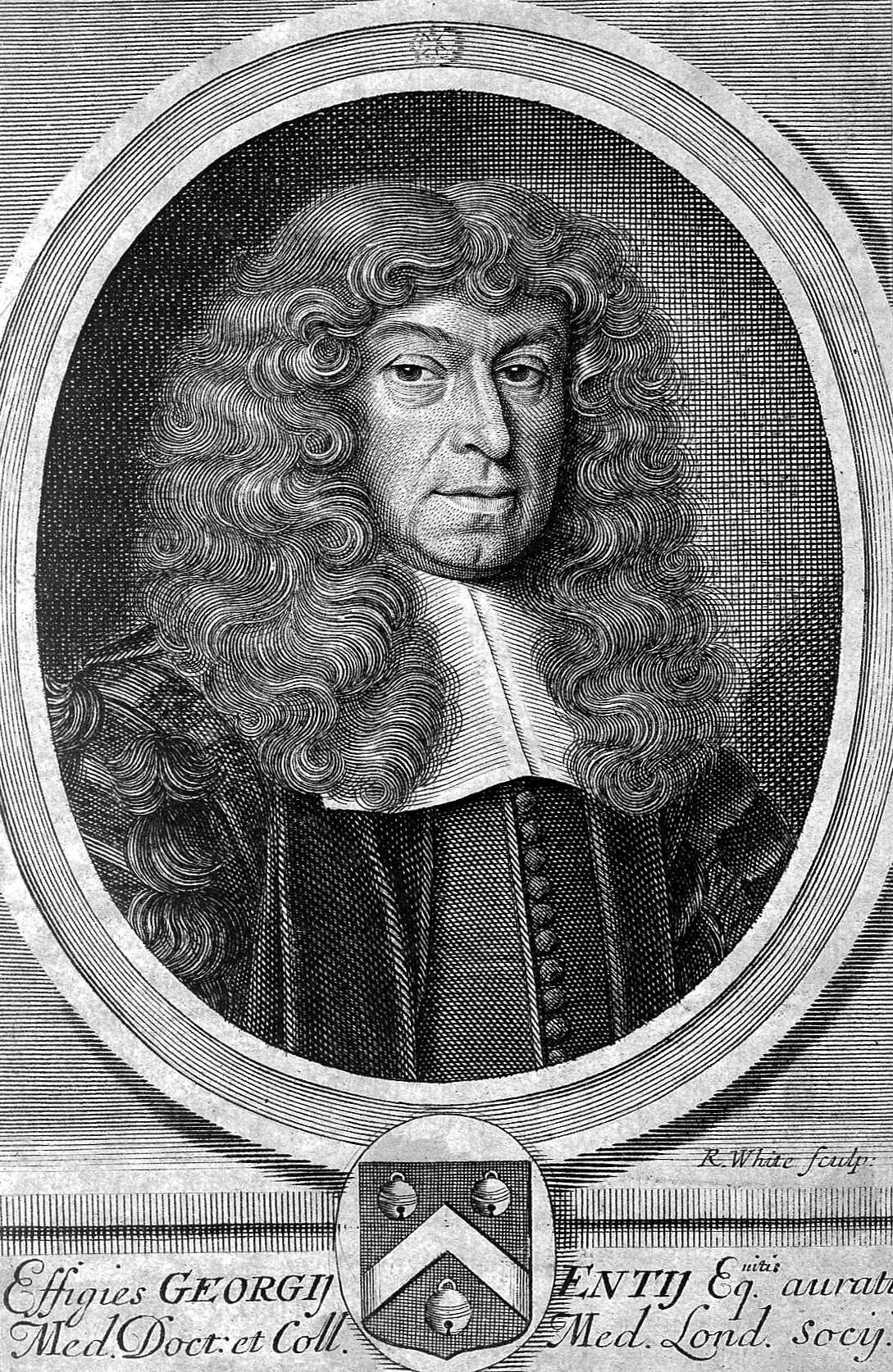
George Ent died 13 October

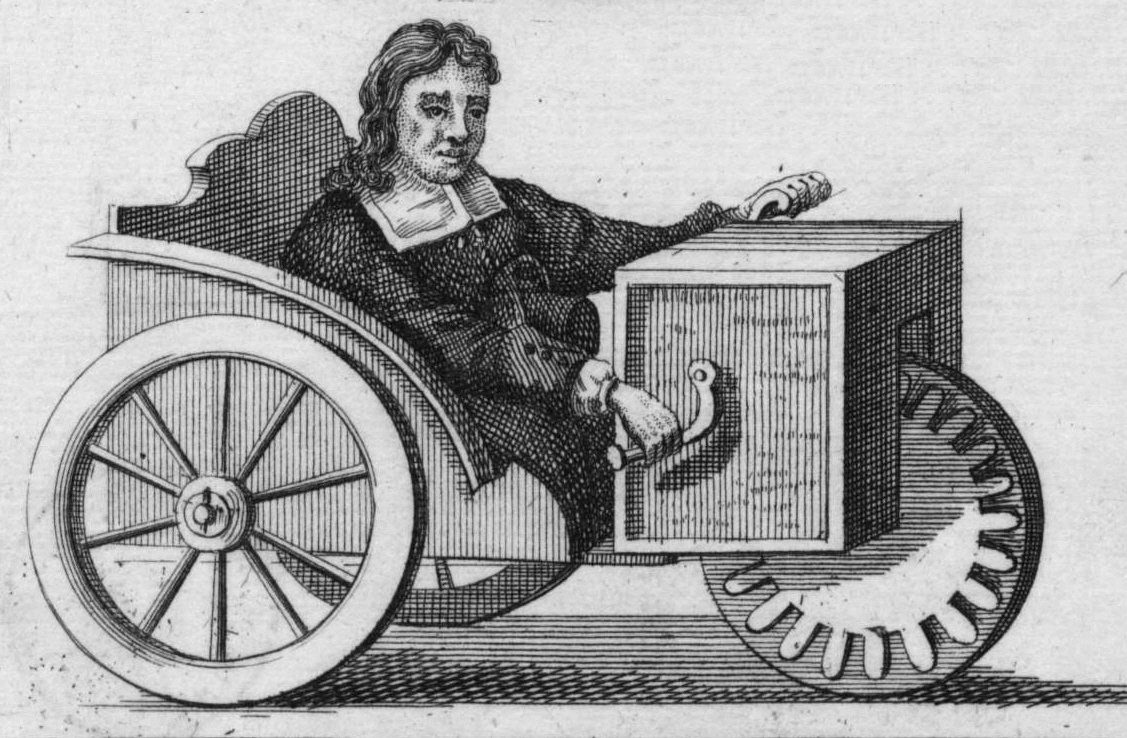
Stephan Farffler died 24 October

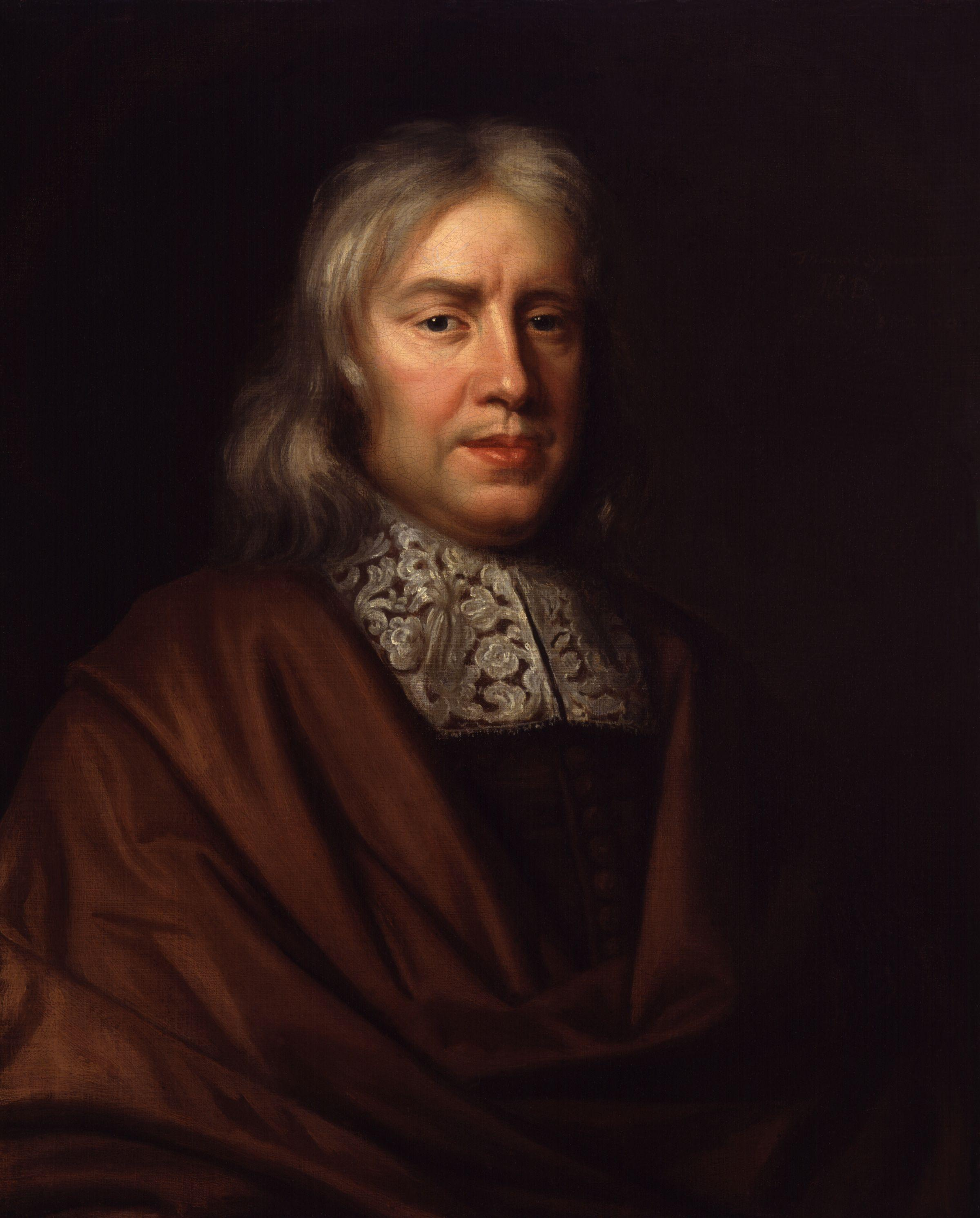
Thomas Sydenham died 29 December

=== January ===
- January 6
  - Cristoforo Ivanovich, Venetian historian and librettist of Serb origin (b. 1628)
  - Bishop Seth Ward, Bishop of Salisbury, mathematician and astronomer (b. 1617)
- January 9 – Sir Hugh Cholmeley, 4th Baronet, English politician (b. 1632)
- January 16 – Gilbert Holles, 3rd Earl of Clare, English politician (b. 1633)
- January 18
  - Ernest Günther I, Duke of Schleswig-Holstein-Sonderburg-Augustenburg (b. 1609)
  - Humphrey Lloyd, British bishop (b. 1610)
- January 24 – Henry Waldegrave, 1st Baron Waldegrave, English peer and Jacobite supporter (b. 1661)
- January 27
  - Robert Aske, merchant & haberdasher in the City of London (b. 1619)
  - Sir Henry Beaumont, 2nd Baronet, English politician (b. 1638)
  - Thomas Colepeper, 2nd Baron Colepeper, English noble and colonial governor of Virginia (b. 1635)
- January 28 – Bernardino Corniani, Roman Catholic prelate, Bishop of Pula (b. 1626)
- January 29 – Maria van Cortlandt van Rensselaer, Dutch director of Rensselaerswyck (Albany, New York) (b. 1645)
- January 31 – Manuel de Herrera, Roman Catholic prelate, Bishop of Durango (b. 1635)

=== February ===
- February 1 – Sir John Borlase, 2nd Baronet, English politician (b. 1642)
- February 4 – Moshe ben Yonatan Galante, Ottoman rabbi (b. 1621)
- February 5 – William Coddington Jr., Rhode Island colonial governor (b. 1651)
- February 6 – Metcalfe Robinson, English politician (b. 1629)
- February 8 – Sir John Gell, 2nd Baronet, English politician (b. 1613)
- February 12 – Marie Louise d'Orléans, Queen of Spain as the wife of King Charles II (b. 1662)
- February 13 – Carlo Pio di Savoia, Italian Catholic cardinal (b. 1622)
- February 18 – Alexander Farnese, Prince of Parma, Spanish politician and military personnel (b. 1635)
- February 19 – Khushal Khattak, Afghan poet (b. 1613)
- February 21 – Isaac Vossius, Dutch classical scholar (b. 1618)
- February 22 – Willem Ogier, Flemish playwright (b. 1618)
- February 24 – Elsa Elisabeth Brahe, Swedish countess and duchess (b. 1632)
- February 28 – Thomas Benedict, American settler (b. 1617)

=== March ===
- March 7 – Franz Johann von Vogt von Altensumerau und Prasberg, Bishop of Constance (b. 1611)
- March 8 – Alexander Parker, British minister (b. 1628)
- March 9 – François Adhémar de Monteil, French priest, Bishop of Saint-Paul-Trois-Châteaux (b. 1603)
- March 10 – Philip Louis, Duke of Schleswig-Holstein-Sonderburg-Wiesenburg (b. 1620)
- March 11
  - Kim Ik-hun, Korean General and philosopher, soldier, politician (b. 1619)
  - Sambhaji, High Protector of the Maratha Empire (b. 1657)
- March 14 – Anthony Coucheron, Norwegian engineer (b. 1650)
- March 15 – Yolo, Qing dynasty prince (b. 1625)
- March 18 – John Dixwell, regicide (b. 1607)
- March 24
  - Thomas Ballard, American politician (b. 1630)
  - Michiel ten Hove, Grand Pensionary of Holland (b. 1640)
- March 26 – Gabriel Milan, Governor of the Danish West Indies (b. 1631)
- March 29 – Sir John Hotham, 2nd Baronet, Member of the House of Commons of England (b. 1632)
- March 30 – Kazimierz Łyszczyński, Polish philosopher (b. 1634)
- March 31 – Tommaso Caracciolo, Bishop of Gerace (b. 1640)

=== April ===
- April 4 – Archduchess Maria Anna Josepha of Austria, youngest surviving daughter of Ferdinand III (b. 1654)
- April 12 – John Hunting, first ruling elder of the church of Dedham, Massachusetts (b. 1602)
- April 14 – Lorenzo Onofrio Colonna, Italian noble (b. 1637)
- April 16 – Aphra Behn, British playwright, poet and spy (b. 1640)
- April 18 – George Jeffreys, 1st Baron Jeffreys, Welsh judge, aka the Hanging Judge (b. 1645)
- April 19 – Christina, Queen of Sweden, ruled from 1632 until abdication in 1654 (b. 1626)
- April 22 – Thomas Proby, English politician (b. 1632)

=== May ===
- May 11 – Charles Goodall, English poet (b. 1671)
- May 12 – Sir John Reresby, 2nd Baronet, English politician and diarist (b. 1634)
- May 15 – Jean Paul Médaille, French Jesuit missionary (b. 1618)
- May 20 – Estevão Brioso de Figueiredo, Roman Catholic prelate, Bishop of Funchal of Olinda (b. 1630)
- May 23 – Charles Erskine, Earl of Mar, Scottish noble (b. 1650)
- May 25 – Charles Errard, French painter (b. 1606)

=== June ===
- June 4 – René Gaultier de Varennes, New France governor (b. 1635)
- June 7 – Alphonse de Berghes, Roman Catholic archbishop (b. 1624)
- June 8 – Decio Azzolino, Italian Catholic cardinal (b. 1623)
- June 9 – François Bonnemer, French painter and engraver (b. 1638)
- June 10 – Christophe Veyrier, sculptor (b. 1637)
- June 13 – William Annand, Minister of the Church of Scotland and the Church of England (b. 1633)
- June 14 – Conyers Darcy, 1st Earl of Holderness, English noble (b. 1598)
- June 17
  - Jan Baptist de Crépu, Flemish painter and army officer (b. 1631)
  - Marcin Zamoyski, Polish noble (b. 1637)
- June 20
  - Willem Coucheron, Dutch general in the Dano-Norwegian army (b. 1600)
  - Richard Sherlock, English Anglican priest (b. 1612)
- June 21 – Thomas Blanchet, French painter (b. 1614)
- June 25 – William Thomas, Welsh Anglican bishop (b. 1613)
- June 27 – Richard Waldron, New England politician (b. 1615)
- June 28 – Thomas Mainwaring, English politician (b. 1623)

=== July ===
- July 1 – Anne Crawford-Lindsay, Scottish nobility (b. 1631)
- July 2 – Edward Villiers, 1st Duke of Buckingham (b. 1620)
- July 7 – Princess Louise of Savoy, Hereditary Princess of Baden-Baden (b. 1627)
- July 8
  - Menahem Mendel Auerbach, Austrian banker and rabbi (b. 1620)
  - Edward Wooster, English Connecticut pioneer (b. 1622)
- July 19 – Song Si-yeol, Korean philosopher (b. 1607)
- July 23 – Frederick Wilhelm von Pfalz-Neuburg, German noble (b. 1665)
- July 27 – John Graham, 1st Viscount Dundee, Scottish general (b. 1648)

=== August ===
- August 6 – Princess Dorothea Sophie of Schleswig-Holstein-Sonderburg-Glücksburg, Electress of Brandenburg (b. 1636)
- August 9 – Dionisio Lazzari, Italian sculptor and architect (b. 1617)
- August 12 – Pope Innocent XI, pope of the Catholic Church (b. 1611)
- August 13 – Count Maximilian I, Prince of Hohenzollern-Sigmaringen, Count of Hohenzollern-Sigmaringen (b. 1636)
- August 15 – John Gregory, Connecticut settler (b. 1612)
- August 17
  - William Boynton, English politician (b. 1641)
  - Thomas Street, astronomer (b. 1621)
- August 20 – Antonio Marinari, Roman Catholic prelate, Auxiliary Bishop of Ostia-Velletri, Titular Bishop of Thagaste (b. 1605)
- August 21 – William Cleland, Scottish poet and soldier (b. c. 1661)
- August 24 – Empress Xiaoyiren, third Empress of the Kangxi Emperor
- August 28
  - Claude-Jean Allouez, French Jesuit missionary and explorer of North America (b. 1622)
  - Alexander Coosemans, Flemish still life painter (b. 1627)
- August 29 – Curwen Rawlinson, English politician (b. 1641)
- August 30 – John Lake, English bishop (b. 1624)

=== September ===
- September 6 – Torii Tadanori, Daimyo who ruled the Takatō Domain in Shinano Province (b. 1646)
- September 9 – Jane Lane, Lady Fisher, English Royalist (b. 1626)
- September 10 – John Belasyse, 1st Baron Belasyse, English politician and noble (b. 1614)
- September 13 – Ciro Ferri, Italian painter, engraver, sculptor and architect (b. 1634)
- September 15
  - Balthasar Cellarius, German theologian (b. 1614)
  - Timoléon Cheminais de Montaigu, French theologian (b. 1652)
- September 18 – Sir Richard Head, 1st Baronet, English politician (b. 1600)
- September 26 – August, Duke of Schleswig-Holstein-Sonderburg-Beck (b. 1652)
- September 30 – Julius Francis, Duke of Saxe-Lauenburg, Bohemian noble (b. 1641)

=== October ===
- October 1 – Alexander Voet the Elder, Flemish engraver (b. 1608)
- October 4 – Quirinus Kuhlmann, German Baroque poet and mystic (b. 1651)
- October 11 – Fyodor Shaklovity, Russian diplomat (b. 1640)
- October 13 – George Ent, English scientist and physician; (b. 1604)
- October 14 – Adolph John I, Count Palatine of Kleeburg, Swedish prince (b. 1629)
- October 15 – Sir Edward Dering, 3rd Baronet, English politician (b. 1650)
- October 24 – Stephan Farffler, German inventor (b. 1633)
- October 25 – Joseph Maynard, English politician (b. 1639)
- October 30 – Pier Antonio Capobianco, Roman Catholic prelate, Bishop of Lacedonia (b. 1619)

=== November ===
- November 9 – Enea Silvio Piccolomini, imperial general (b. 1651)
- November 12 – Justus de Verwer, Dutch painter and illustrator (b. 1625)
- November 13
  - Matteo Borboni, Italian painter (b. 1610)
  - Philipp von Zesen, German poet (b. 1619)
- November 16 – Cornelis Mahu, Flemish painter (b. 1613)
- November 18 – Jacob van der Ulft, painter from the Northern Netherlands (b. 1621)
- November 19 – Elizabeth Cavendish, Countess of Devonshire, English noblewoman; (b. 1619)
- November 20 – Samuel Peterson, American city founder (b. 1639)
- November 24 – Carey Dillon, 5th Earl of Roscommon, Irish nobleman and professional soldier (b. 1627)
- November 26 – Marquard Gude, German archaeologist (b. 1635)

=== December ===
- December 2 – George Speke, English politician (b. 1623)
- December 6 – Pjetër Bogdani, Albanian priest and writer (b. c. 1630)
- December 12 – Louis Ferdinand Elle the Elder, French painter (b. 1612)
- December 15 – Anne Neville, abbess of Pontoise (b. 1605)
- December 16
  - Cornelis Geelvinck, Dutch mayor (b. 1621)
  - Thomas Wyndham, English Member of Parliament (b. 1640)
- December 25 – Oliver Montagu, English Member of Parliament (b. 1655)
- December 27 – Gervase Bryan, English clergyman (b. 1622)
- December 28 – Pietro Montanini, Italian painter (b. 1626)
- December 29
  - Olfert Dapper, Dutch physician and writer (b. 1636)
  - George Kinnaird, 1st Lord Kinnaird, Scottish aristocrat (b. 1622)
  - Françoise Bertaut de Motteville, French writer (b. 1621)
  - Thomas Sydenham, English physician (b. 1624)
- December 31
  - Felipe Fernandez de Pardo, Roman Catholic prelate, Archbishop of Manila (b. 1611)
  - Gilbert de Choiseul Duplessis Praslin, Roman Catholic bishop (b. 1613)
  - Anders Sinclair, Scottish soldier who joined Swedish service during the Thirty Years' War (b. 1614)
