= Pietro Gnocchi =

Italian composer (1689–1775)

Pietro Gnocchi (27 February 1689 – 9 December 1775) was an Italian composer, choir director, historian, and geographer of the late Baroque era, active mainly in Brescia, where he was choir director of Brescia Cathedral. In addition to composing an abundance of eccentrically titled sacred music, all of which remains in manuscript, he wrote a 25-volume history of ancient Greek colonies.

== Life ==
The principal source for information on Gnocchi's life is an unpublished manuscript written by his associate C. Cristoni, now in the Biblioteca Civica Queriniana in Brescia. Gnocchi was born in Alfianello, in the Province of Brescia, then under the control of the Republic of Venice. The second of four sons of a middle-class family, he studied music and eventually became a priest. Following the death of his younger brother, he commenced a period of travel, initially studying music in Venice and later going to Hungary, Vienna, and Munich; after these travels, he returned to Brescia where he spent most of the remainder of his long life, devoting it to scholarly and musical pursuits.

In 1723, he was appointed maestro di cappella at Brescia Cathedral; however, he was unsuccessful in his bid to become an organist there in 1733. He also worked at the Orfanelle della Pietà, an orphanage, where he may have served as a music instructor. In 1762, when he was 73 years old, he reapplied for his old position as maestro di cappella at Brescia Cathedral, as well as the position as organist; he then held both posts until his death at the age of 86.

== Music, writings, and influence ==
Gnocchi left an enormous amount of music, mostly sacred, but including some secular vocal music and some instrumental compositions. None was published, and the only thing to emerge from a printer was the title page and dedication for a 12-volume set of masses, the Salmi brevi. His compositions included 60 masses, many of which were Requiems, for four to eight voices, some with instruments; six Requiems, for two to four voices; six sets of Vespers for the entire church year, also for four to eight voices, with organ accompaniment; 12 settings of the Magnificat, for four voices; six settings of the Miserere, for four to eight voices; motets, hymns, and miscellaneous liturgical music. In addition to the sacred music, he wrote some canzonette and a body of instrumental music, including a concerto for seven strings and basso continuo and three trio sonatas for two violins and basso continuo. Stylistically, his music borrows some traits from the Venetians, unsurprisingly considering that he studied there. He uses double choirs in a homophonic texture, a style descended from the early Baroque Venetian School, rarely writing imitatively.

Gnocchi was greatly interested in history and geography. These interests show in the titles of his compositions, many of which are highly eccentric: a Magnificat, Il capo di buona speranza (The Cape of Good Hope), and masses named "Europe", "America", "Africa", and "Asia" are characteristic.

Something of a polymath, he wrote on various topics in history, geography, and archaeology in addition to composing music and performing his duties as a priest. He produced a treatise on memorial tablets in the Brescia region and a 25-volume history of ancient Greek colonies; both of these Gnocchi were sold to Prince Faustino Lechi of Brescia, who was a student and later friend and patron of Gnocchi.

David Fallows, in his article on "spoof articles" in the 2001 New Grove, cites Gnocchi's unusual career, singularly titled and voluminous works, and "lugubrious" portrait (in Die Musik in Geschichte und Gegenwart) as an example of why spoof articles do not need to exist in music encyclopedias: there are already musicians so strange that spoofs would be superfluous.

While none of Gnocchi's music has been published, one CD of some of his instrumental works is available: a 2005 recording of sonatas by Brixia Musicalis. In 2005, LIBER, a non-profit society in Alfianello, Gnocchi's birthplace, initiated the "Eventi nel segno di Pietro Gnocchi", a festival of sacred music. Some of his masses, as well as vocal and instrumental works, were played. The concerts take place on the third Sunday of October.

Most of Gnocchi's music output is stored in the archives of the Brescia Cathedral and Chiesa della Madonna delle Grazie in Brescia.

== Selected discography ==
- Pietro Gnocchi: Six Concertos/Sonata a tre: Main-Barockorchester / Martin Jopp. Aeolus AE 10077. Released 2016
