= Giovanni Casini =

Italian painter

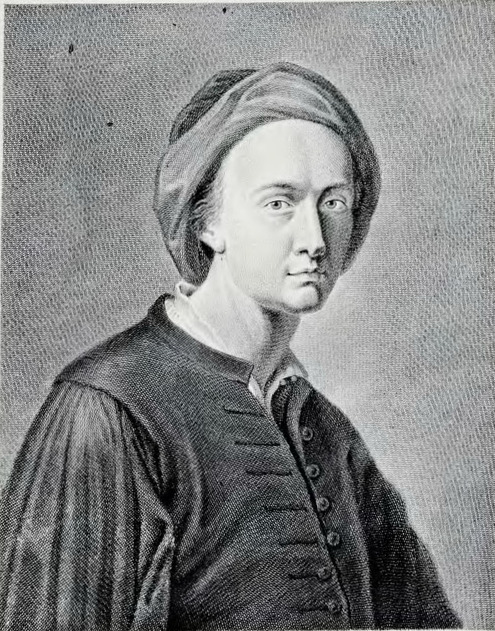
- Born: 24 June 1689; Varlungo
- Died: 29 March 1748 (aged 58); Florence
- Occupation: Painter, sculptor

Giovanni Casini (1689–1748) was a portrait painter and sculptor. He was known as il Varlunga, based on his native town in the Grand Duchy of Tuscany.
