= Jan Frans Foppens =

Flemish ecclesiastical historian, literary biographer and bibliographer

- Born: Johannes Franciscus Foppens; 17 November 1689; Brussels, Spanish Netherlands
- Died: 16 July 1761 (aged 71); Mechelen, Austrian Netherlands
- Resting place: St. Rumbold's Cathedral
- Citizenship: Habsburg Netherlands
- Education: Leuven University
- Occupations: clergyman, historian and poet
- Writing career
- Language: Dutch, Latin, French
- Genres: ecclesiastical history, literary biography and bibliography
- Subjects: Bishoprics and writers in the Habsburg Netherlands, history of Mechelen
- Notable works: Bibliotheca belgica, sive virorum in Belgio vita scriptisque illustrium catalogus (2 vols., Brussels, 1739)

Jan Frans Foppens or Johannes Franciscus Foppens (baptized on 17 November 1689 – 16 July 1761) was a historian, literary biographer, bibliographer and poet. His principal subjects were the ecclesiastical history and religious writers of the Southern Netherlands. He is best known for his Bibliotheca belgica, sive virorum in Belgio vita scriptisque illustrium catalogus (2 vols., Brussels, 1739), a description of prominent religious authors of the Southern Netherlands and their works.

== Life ==
Foppens was baptized on 17 November 1689 in the Church of Our Lady of the Chapel in Brussels as the son of the printer Frans (Franciscus) Foppens II and Johanna de Surmont. The forefathers of the Foppens family were from Friesland, which they had left on religious grounds to settle in Brussels. He had two sisters and two brothers of whom one - Pieter - continued the family's printing business and printed some of his works.

He first studied with the Jesuits in Brussels. He then continued his studies at Leuven University from 1704 and graduated Master of Arts in philosophy in 1706 at the age of 17. At the end of 1713 he began lecturing on philosophy at Leuven University while studying theology. His lectures were well attended. In 1715 he graduated as a Licentiate of Theology. He then started studies to become a priest, first at the Van Malderen College (Malderus College) at Leuven University and later at the seminary of Liège.

His first clerical appointment was as canon of the church of St Martin in Aalst. He was appointed on 22 October 1721 second prebend of St. Salvator's Cathedral in Bruges. From 1721 to the end of 1729 he was professor of theology at the seminary of Bruges. On 19 December 1729, he was appointed a senior canon of the St. Rumbold's Cathedral in Mechelen. In 1732, he was appointed archpriest of the western part of the district of Mechelen, and subsequently a penitentiary in 1737. On 4 August 1740, he was conferred the title of archdeacon and the office of book censor.

He died in Mechelen on 16 July 1761 and was buried in the cathedral.

== Works ==
=== Publications ===
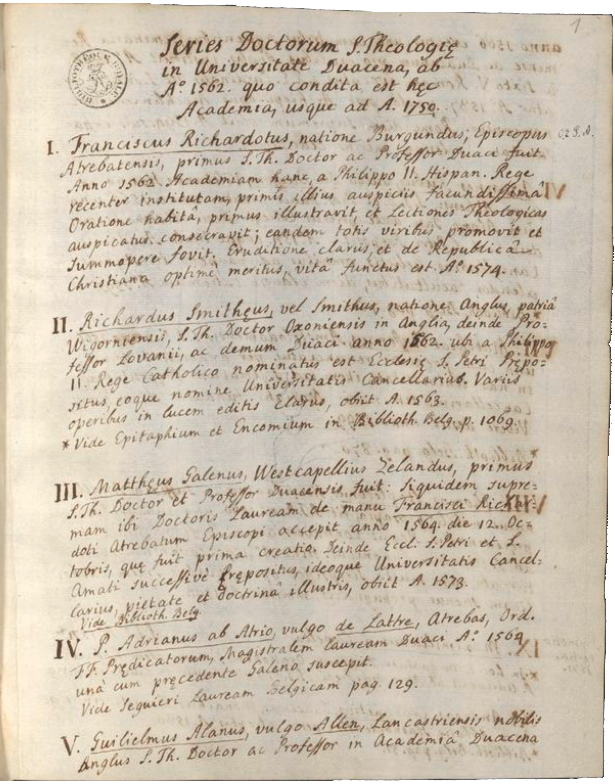
Page 1 of the Historia et series doctorum academiae Duacensis, ab anno 1562 ad ann.1750 (KBR ms. 17592-94)

- Historia episcopatus anlverpiensis, continens episcoporum serieni et capilulorum, abbatiartim et monasteriorum fundationes, etc., Brussels, Frans Foppens, 1717, in-4°.
- Historia episcopatus Sylvœducensis, continens episcoporum et vicariorum generalium seriem et capitulorum, abbatiarum et monasteriorum fundationes, etc. fb., apud eundem, 1721, in-4°.
- Auberti Mirœi opera diplomatica et historica, editio secunda auctior et correctior, I en II, Leiden, Gilles Denique, en Brussels, Frans Foppens, 1725; III, Pieter Foppens, 1754; IV apud eundem, 1748.
- Oratio panegyrica in honorem S. Caroli Borromœi, exhibent operarium evangelicum, habita in die octava ejus in ecclesia, cathedrali S. Donatiani Brugis, die 11 novemb, 1726. in-f°.
- Oratio panegyrica exhibens S. Lucam evangelistam, medicum corporum et animarum, dicta Bruxellis in ecclesia parochiali S. Nicolai, 18 octobris 1750, in-f°.
- Oratio panegyrica exhibens S. Carolum Borromœum velut alterum Judam Machabœum, habita Bruxellis, die 4 novembris 1729, in SS. Michaelis et Gudilœ, ac rursum in octava sive 11 sequente in cathedrali ecclesia S. Donatiani Brugis, in-f°.
- Compendium chronologicum episcoporum Brugensium, nec non praepositorum, decanorum et canonicorum, etc., ecclesiæ cathedralis S. Donatiani Brugensis, Brugge, Jacques Beernaert, 1751, in-8° of in-12, 272 p.
- Bibliotheca Belgica, sive virorum in Belgio vila scriptisque illustrium culalogus librorumque nomenclatura, continens scriptores a clariss. viris Valerio Andrea, Aub. Miraeo, Franc. Sweertio aliisque recensitus usque ad annum 1680, Brussels, Pieter Foppens, 1739, 2 vol. in-4°
- Oratio funebris in exequiis augustiss. imp. Caroli VI, habita Mechliniæ, die januarii 1741, in-4°, 16 p.
- Basilica Bruxellensis, sive monumenta antiqua, inscriptiones et cænotaphia insignis ecclesiæ collegiatæ SS. Michaelis et Gudilæ, editio auctior et emendatior, Malines, Laur. Vander Elst, 1745, in-8°, 2 dln.
- Luctus ecclesiae Mechliniensis a die 5 jan. 1789, quo obiit emin: ac rev. DD. Th. Philippus S. R. E. cardinalis de Alsatia, Brussels, Pieter Foppens, 1789, in-f°, 15 p.
- Jubilaeum quinti saeculi canonicorum Zellariensium, Brussels, Pieter Foppens, 1760, in-4°.
- Chronologia sacra episcoporum Belgii, seu series eorumdem prœsulum nuper ab illustriss. D. J.-B.-L. de Castillion, Brugensi episcopo, usque ad annum 1719 edita; nunc ad tempus praesens continuata, Brussels, Antoine D'Ours, 1761, in-8° of in-12.
- Carmina varia, variis annis edita.

=== Poetry ===
- Applausus ecclesiae Mechliniensis D. archiepiscopo suo D. Thomae Philippo de Alsatia, in-f°.

=== Manuscripts including annotations to publications ===
- De diminutione dierum festorum et bullae quaedam desuper, in-f°.
- Belgica christiana, in qua omnium Belgii episcoporum vitae ad haec usque tempora, accurate describuntur, eorumque effigies et insignia gentilitia exhibentur; junctae sunt delineationes praecipuarum Belgii ecclesiarum et urbium, tabulae quoque geographicae singularum Belgii dioecesium.
- Mechlinia christo nascens et crescens.
- Doctores theologiae ac professores qui supremum hunc titulum adepti sunt Lovanii, In-f°.
- Promotiones in artibus ab erectione universitatis Lovan. usque ad annum, 1766, ex libris originalibus facultatis artiumcollectœ.
- Institutio archiepiscopatus et archiepiscopi Mechliniensis et alia, in-f°.
- Bibliothèque historique des Pays-Bas, contenant le catalogue de presque tous les ouvrages, tant imprimés que manuscrits, qui traitent de l’histoire, principalement des XVII provinces, avec des notes, in-f°.
- Supplemenlum bibliothecae Belgicae J.-F. Foppens, 5 vol., in-4°.
- Correspondentie-brief van den zeer geleerden heer Herman Schomaker, secretaris der stad Zutphen, 1764, in-4°, 12 p.
- Annotata et literae RR. dominorum J.-F. Foppens et Jac. Goyers, in-4°.
- Paquet de lettres adressées au chanoine Goyers par divers savans et autres personnes, pour lui donner des renseignemens relatifs à la Bibliotheca Belgica, Bibl. Hullhem., VI, nr. 835.
- Paquet de lettres et d’autres documens sur le même sujet. Bibl. Hulthem, VI, nr. 826.
- Farde de notes du chanoine Goyers dont la plupart ont rapport au même travail. Bibl. Hulthem., VI, nr. 837.
- Chronycke van Mechelen door den heere Foppens, in-4°. Catal. de Van Meldert, p. 129, nr. 1525.
- Analecta historica de vita et gestis Antonii Perrenot de Granvelle, primi Mechl. archiepiscopi, per eundem, in-4°.
- Mémoires pour servir à l’histoire du conseil privé. Catal. de Van Meldert, p. 132, nr. 1559.
- Analecta de Thoma Van Thielt, pseudo-abbate S. Bernardi ad Scaldim, in-4°. Catal. de Van Meldert, p. 132, nr. 1561.
- Necrologium Belgicum virorum Romano-Catholicorum, praesertim ex academia Lovaniensi, qui infulis, doctrina, pietate, dignitate, libris editis, ac praecipue singulari erga sanctam sedem observantia claruerunt ab anno 1640 (1650), usque ad annum 1759. Oppositum necrologio nuperis annis apud Batavos edito, una cum triplici indice alphabetico, chronologico et onomastico ad supplementum Bibliothecae scriptorum Belgicorum prodromus.
- Decani ecclesiae collegiatae sanctae Monegundis Chimacensis in Hannonia, in-f°. Premier catal. de M. de Santander, Bruxelles, 1767, p. 23, nr. 247.
- Instructio decanorum christianitatis dioecesis Brugensis, in-4°, Ibid., p. 56, nr. 650.
- Ecclesia collegiata S. Petri in Anderlecht, in-4°, Ibid., p. 56, nr. 650
- Canonicorum Leodiensium series ab anno 1802, ad an. 1747, in-8°, Ibid., p. 140, nr. 1738.
- Libellas vere famosus de admirandis Belgii turribus, carumque incendiis, in-4°, Bibl. Hulth., VI, nr. 211.
- Jo.-Fr. Foppens, Br. opera poetica tam manuscripta quam impressa, in-f°, Biblioth.Hulth., VI, 214.
- Pièces manuscrites et imprimées, touchant le séjour des Français en Belgique de 1745 à 1748, recueillies par J.-F. Foppens, in-4°.
- Histoire ecclésiastique des Pays-Bas, par J.-F. Foppens, servant de second volume à la même histoire par G. Gazel, 2 t. en 1 vol., in-f°, p. 528 et 320.
- Notice des archevêques et évêques des Pays-Bas, après leurs créations l’an 1559, avec leurs armoiries et inscriptions sépulcrales; recueillies par J.-F. Foppens, avec quelques annotations de Jean Bapt. Verdussen et des portraits, in-f° de 236 p., 22 portraits gravés et environ 185 arm. dont 171 enluminées. Bibl. Hulth., VI, nr. 485.
- Paquet de documens et notes historiques et autres, de la main de J.-F. Foppens et du chanoine Goyers, in-4°, Bibl. Hulth., VI, nr. 553.
- Chronique abrégée de la ville de Brusselles de 647 à 1760, in-f°.
- Annales des choses mémorables advenues en la ville de Bruxelles et dans ses environs, depuis 657 jusque 1756, par J.-F. Foppens Gr. in-4°, Bibl. Hulth., VI, nr. 700.
- Chronique de Bruxelles, de 974 à 1773, in-f°.
- Clari Mechlinienses, in-f°, Bibl. Hulth., VI, nr. 838.
- Dissertatio de Bibliomania Belgica hodierna, quae specialiter de libris agitur quos, anno 1755, placuit phœnices librorumappellare, in-8°, Bibl. Hulth., VI, nr. 884.
- Historia et series doctorum Academiae Duacensis ab anno 1562 ad ann. 1750 ; auct. J.-F. Foppens, in-4°, Bibl. Hulth., VI, nr. 818.
- Histoire du conseil de Flandre, depuis son érection en 1585, jusqu’à l’an 1758, 274 p. in-f°.
- Epitaphia Brugensia quae extant in diversis ecclesiis; nec non Ostendana, Dixmudana, et in ecclesia parochiali de Poucques.Collegit J.-F. Foppens.
- Collectanea sacra Brugensia et Oslendana, in-f°.
- Collectanea sacra Namurcensia, in-f°.
- Fasti seu natales sanctorum Belgii a Jo. Molano, Aub. Mirœo, Arn. Baissio, Aut. Sandero, Barth. Fisenio, aliis hagiographis collecti, auctore J.-F. Foppens, 5 vol. in-4°,
- Acta et facta academicorum Lovaniensium edita et manuscriptu.
- Doctores artium Lovan, in-f°.
- Doctores facultatif medicinae Lot, in-f°.
- Doctores ulriusque jnris Lov, in-f°.
- Status dioecesis Buscoducensis ex originalibus et aliis missis Romam, in-f°.
- Additiones et correctiones ad historiam sacram et prophanam archiepiscopatus Mechl. R. D. Van Gestel, in-f°.
- Status ecclesiae et capiluli D. Rumoldi Mechl. circa ann. 1280, nec non ordo ac series praepositorum, decanorum caeterorumque canonicorurn ejusdem ecclesiae jam pridem eollegiatae, nunc autem ab anno 1889 metropolitanae. Ab anno 1100 usque ad ann., 1760, in-f°.
- Ordo praebendarum et canonicorurn ecclesiae S. Rumoldi ab anno 1400, usque ad nostra tempora 1784, in-f°.
- Reflectiones circa mulalionem faciendam in officiis propriis ecclesiae metropolitanae, in-8°.
- Dissertationes historico-canonicae de canonicis et praebendis graduatis, in-8°.
- Journal de ce qui s'est passé à Malines, tandis que le roy de France Louis XV en était le maitre, depuis le 12 may 1746 jusqu’au 28 janvier 1749, avec les actes vérificatifs, in-f°.
- Coloniensia, Mognntinensia, ctc, quaedam, in-f°.
- Carmina concementia annalem Lovaniensem, in-f°.
- Histoire du conseil de Brabant (1526-1760), in-f°.
- Histoire du grand conseil de S. M., in-f°.
- Bombardement de Bruxelles, par un témoin oculaire, avec les estampes d’A. Coppens et de H. Van Orley, in-4°.
- Miscellanées historiques concernant les diverses provinces des Pays-Bas Autrichiens, in-f°. Bibl. Hulth., V, 239, nr. 796.
- Oratio funebris arch. Maria Elisabetha, 1741.
- Différens recueils pour l'histoire ecclésiastique, civile et littéraire des Pays-Bas.
