= Ignatius van der Beken =

Flemish painter

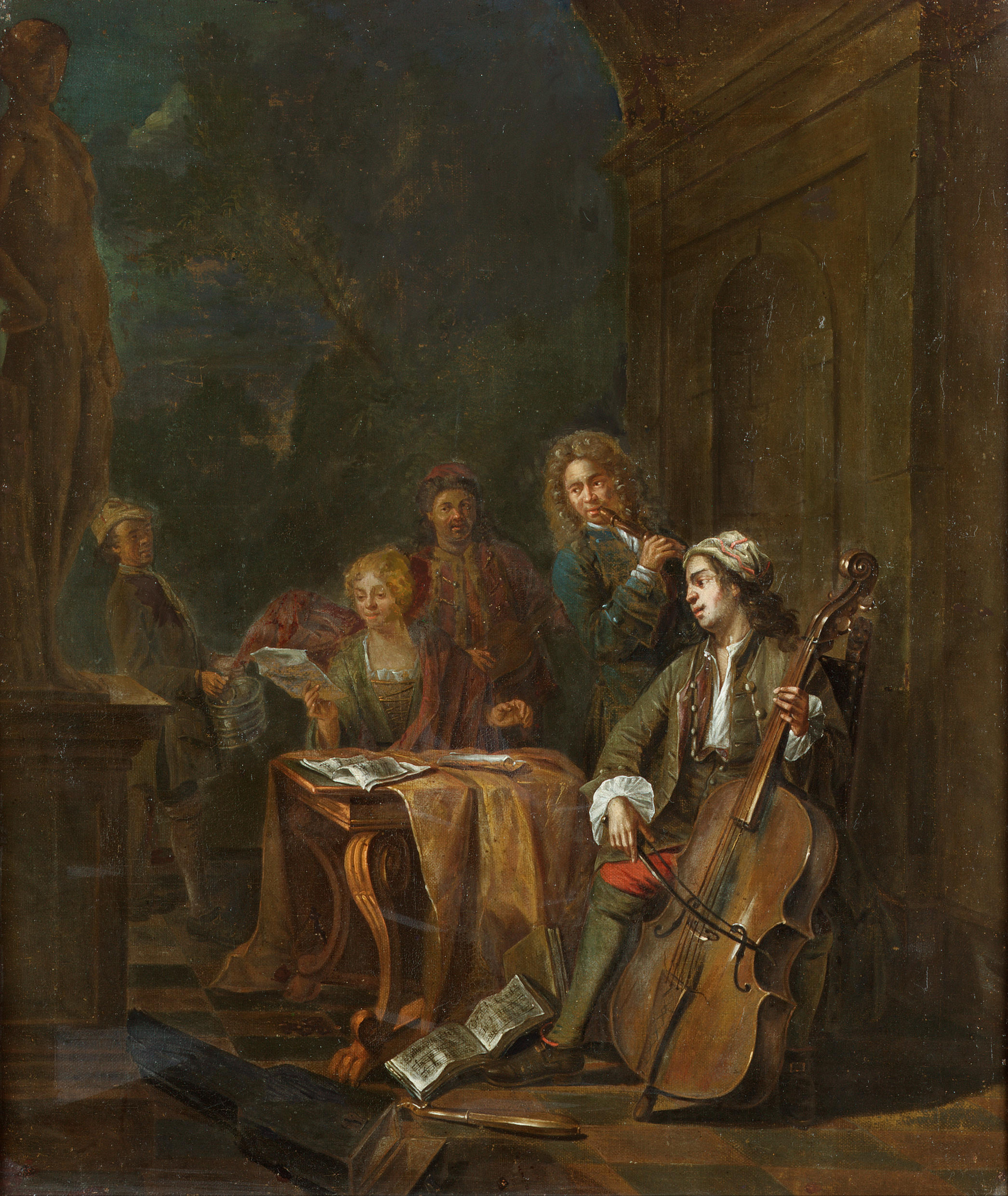
A musical group

Ignatius van der Beken (11 December 1689, Antwerp - 7 June 1774, Antwerp), was a Flemish genre, portrait and still life painter. He was a court painter of Johann Wilhelm, Elector Palatine.

== Life ==
He became an apprentice in the Guild of St. Luke of Antwerp in the Guild year 1700–1701 as a pupil of Willem van Herp the Younger. He resided in Düsseldorf from 1712 to 1716 where he was a court painter of Johann Wilhelm, Elector Palatine.

He returned to Antwerp where he registered again as a master in the Guild of St. Luke in the guild year 1716–1717. Between 1722 and 1749 he served seven times as the dean of the Guild. He is recorded in 1733 in Mainz as he portrayed the Prince-Bishop and Elector Philipp Karl von Eltz-Kempenich and other dignitaries. He was married to Geertrudis Elisabeth Meusses.

He was the master of Clemens-Augustinus Everaerts and Guiglielmus Vasel.

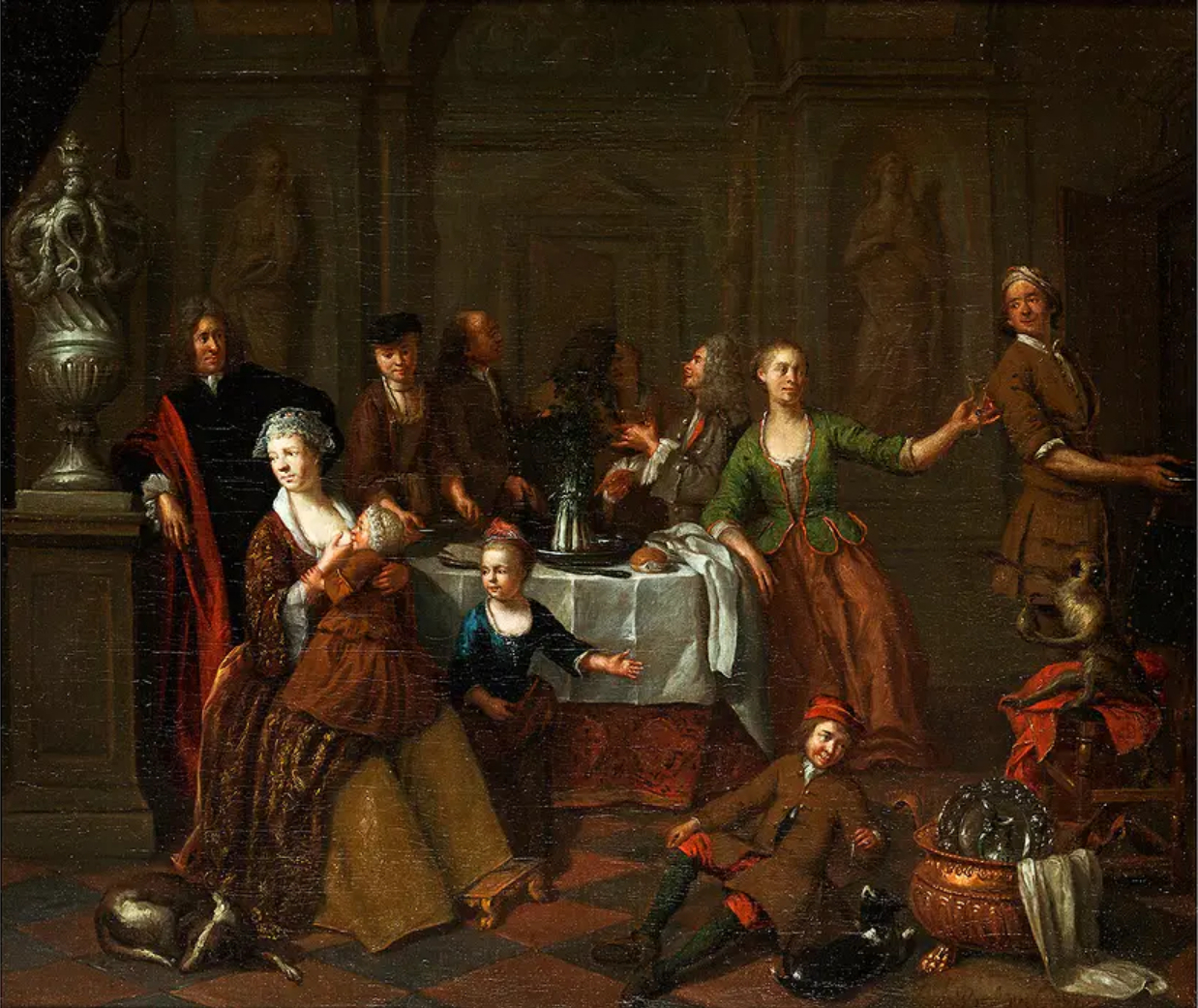
Elegant company enjoying a meal

== Work ==
Van der Beken painted mainly genre scenes and merry companies as well as still lifes. He is also documented as having worked as a portrait painter but these works have been lost. He is known for several genre groups (four examples in the National Gallery of Denmark, Copenhagen). These are executed in a limited palette and muted colors.

Flower still lifes by him are close in style to that of Jan Baptist Bosschaert.
