= 1685 =

1685 in various calendars
- Gregorian calendar: 1685; MDCLXXXV
- Ab urbe condita: 2438
- Armenian calendar: 1134; ԹՎ ՌՃԼԴ
- Assyrian calendar: 6435
- Balinese saka calendar: 1606–1607
- Bengali calendar: 1091–1092
- Berber calendar: 2635
- English Regnal year: 36 Cha. 2 – 1 Ja. 2
- Buddhist calendar: 2229
- Burmese calendar: 1047
- Byzantine calendar: 7193–7194
- Chinese calendar: 甲子年 (Wood Rat); 4382 or 4175 — to — 乙丑年 (Wood Ox); 4383 or 4176
- Coptic calendar: 1401–1402
- Discordian calendar: 2851
- Ethiopian calendar: 1677–1678
- Hebrew calendar: 5445–5446
- Hindu calendars
- Vikram Samvat: 1741–1742
- Shaka Samvat: 1606–1607
- Kali Yuga: 4785–4786
- Holocene calendar: 11685
- Igbo calendar: 685–686
- Iranian calendar: 1063–1064
- Islamic calendar: 1096–1097
- Japanese calendar: Jōkyō 2 (貞享２年)
- Javanese calendar: 1607–1609
- Julian calendar: Gregorian minus 10 days
- Korean calendar: 4018
- Minguo calendar: 227 before ROC 民前227年
- Nanakshahi calendar: 217
- Thai solar calendar: 2227–2228
- Tibetan calendar: ཤིང་ཕོ་བྱི་བ་ལོ་ (male Wood-Rat); 1811 or 1430 or 658 — to — ཤིང་མོ་གླང་ལོ་ (female Wood-Ox); 1812 or 1431 or 659

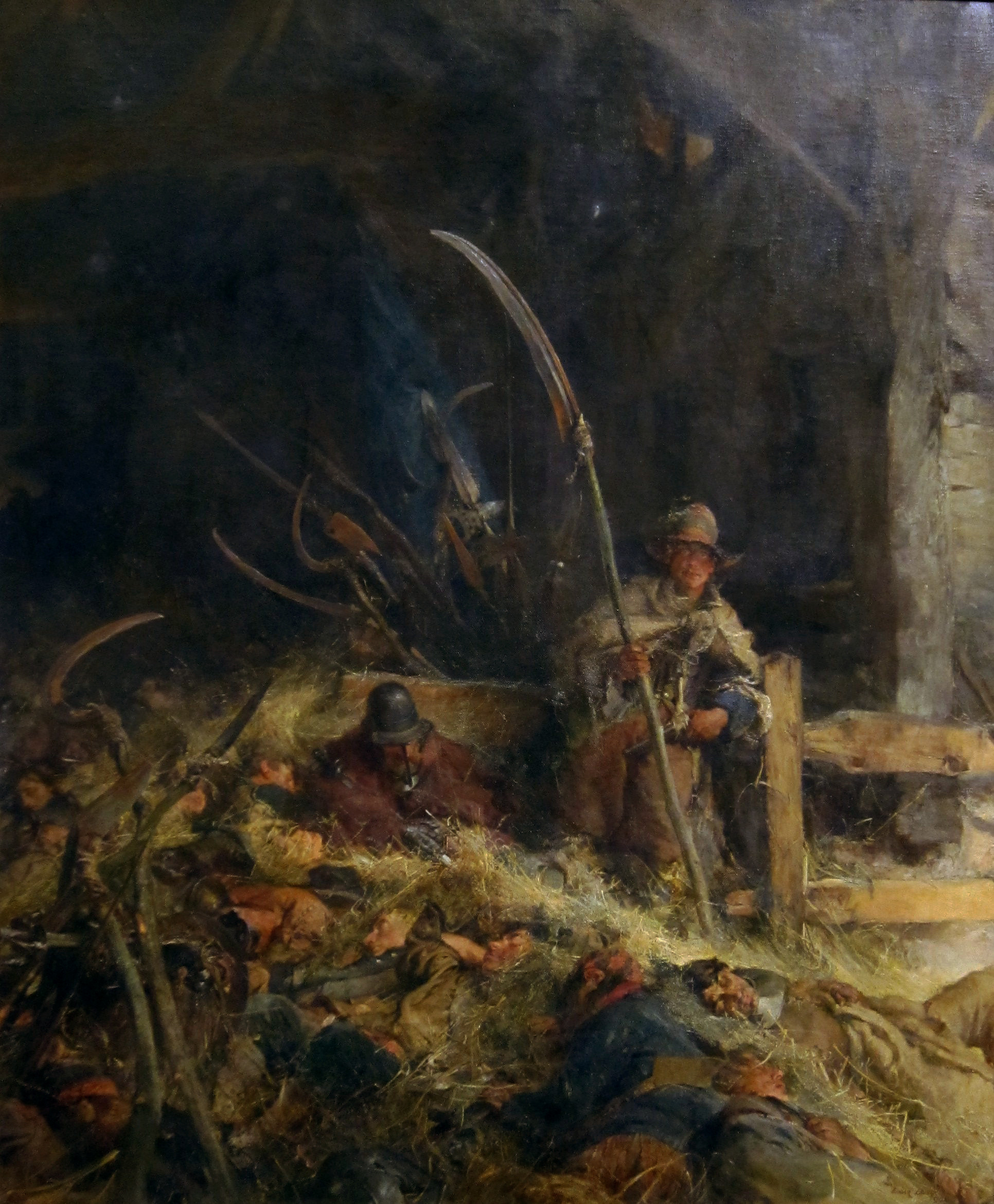
July 6: The Monmouth Rebellion in England ends with the defeat of James Scott, Duke of Monmouth in the Battle of Sedgemoor.

1685 (MDCLXXXV) was a common year starting on Monday of the Gregorian calendar and a common year starting on Thursday of the Julian calendar, the 1685th year of the Common Era (CE) and Anno Domini (AD) designations, the 685th year of the 2nd millennium, the 85th year of the 17th century, and the 6th year of the 1680s decade. As of the start of 1685, the Gregorian calendar was 10 days ahead of the Julian calendar, which remained in localized use until 1923.

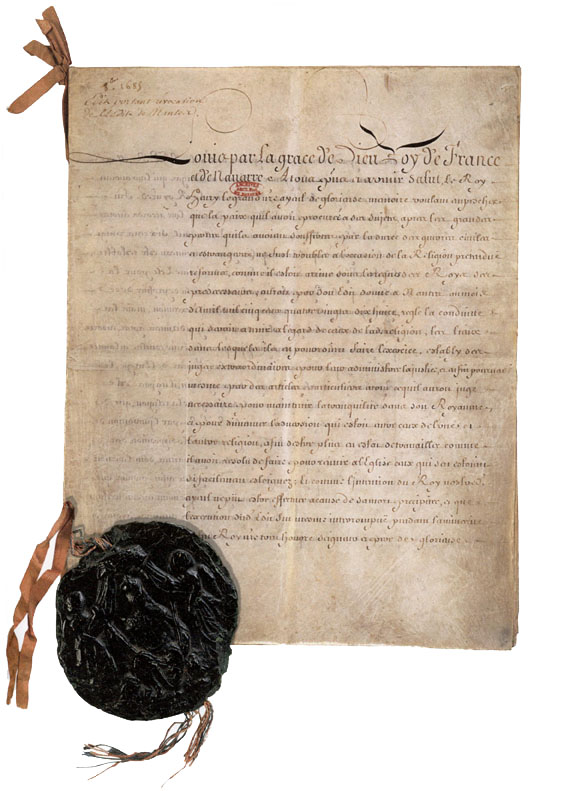
October 22: The Edict of Fontainebleau is signed.

== Events ==
=== January–March ===
- January 6 – American-born British citizen Elihu Yale, for whom Yale University in the U.S. is named, completes his term as the first leader of the Madras Presidency in India, administering the colony on behalf of the East India Company, and is succeeded by William Gyfford.
- January 8 – Almost 200 people are arrested in Coventry by English authorities for gathering to hear readings of the sermons of the non-conformist Protestant minister Obadiah Grew .
- February 4 – A treaty is signed between Brandenburg-Prussia and the indigenous chiefs at Takoradi in what is now Ghana to permit the German colonists to build a third fort on the Brandenburger Gold Coast.
- February 6 – Catholic James Stuart, Duke of York, becomes King James II of England and Ireland, and King James VII of Scotland, in succession to his brother Charles II (1660–1685), King of England, Scotland, and Ireland since 1660. James II and VII reigns until deposed, in 1688.
- February 20 – René-Robert Cavelier, Sieur de La Salle, intending to establish a colony near the mouth of the Mississippi River, lands with 200 surviving colonists at Matagorda Bay on the Texas coast, believing the Mississippi to be near. He establishes Fort St. Louis.
- February–March – Morean War (part of the Great Turkish War): The Ottoman serasker Halil Pasha invades the Mani Peninsula, and forces it to surrender hostages.
- March 28 – An attack on a Mughal Empire envoy, Khwajah Abdur Rahim, outside of the Maratha fortress at the Bijapur Fort in India leads to a siege of the city by the forces of Mughal Emperor Aurangzeb. The siege lasts for 15 months before Bijapur surrenders.
- March – Louis XIV passes the Code Noir, allowing the full use of slaves in the French colonies.

=== April–June ===
- April 16 – Wara Dhammaraza becomes the new King of Arakan on the western coast of Burma upon the death of his brother, Thiri Thuriya.
- April 23 – The coronation of King James II of England (and his Queen Consort, Mary of Modena) takes place at Westminster Abbey.
- May 7 – Morean War – Battle on Vrtijeljka: Advancing Ottoman forces prevail over defending Venetian irregulars, on a hill in the Montenegro Vilayet.
- May 11 – The Killing Time: Five Covenanters in Wigtown, Scotland, notably Margaret Wilson, are executed for refusing to swear an oath declaring King James of England, Scotland and Ireland as head of the church, becoming the Wigtown martyrs.
- June 5 ‐ Governor Edward Cranfield flees the Province of New Hampshire leaving Walter Barefoote in charge. The province descends into lawlessness until the establishment of the Dominion of New England in 1686.
- June 11 – Monmouth Rebellion: James Scott, 1st Duke of Monmouth, illegitimate son of King Charles II of England, Scotland, and Ireland, lands at Lyme Regis with an invasion force brought from the Netherlands, to challenge his uncle, James II, for the Crown of England.
- June 16 – A lunar eclipse is observed in the evening by François-Timoléon de Choisy, amongst others, onboard his ship in the vicinity of Madagascar. The ship was at a latitude of 37 degrees 40 minutes, and the eclipse was not visible from Europe.
- June 20 – Monmouth Rebellion: James, Duke of Monmouth declares himself at Taunton to be King, and heir to his father's Kingdoms as James II of England and Ireland, and James VII of Scotland.

=== July–September ===
- July 6 – Monmouth Rebellion: In the Battle of Sedgemoor, the last pitched battle fought on English soil, the armies of King James II of England defeat rebel forces under James Scott, 1st Duke of Monmouth, and capture the Duke himself shortly after the battle.
- July 15 – James Scott, 1st Duke of Monmouth, is executed at Tower Hill, London, England.
- August 11 – Morean War: The 49-day Siege of Coron ends with the surrender and massacre of its garrison by the Venetians.
- August 25 – The Bloody Assizes begin in Winchester: Lord Chief Justice of England George Jeffreys tries over 1000 of Monmouth's rebels and condemns them to death or transportation.
- September 14 – Morean War: The Republic of Venice defeats an Ottoman army at Kalamata.
- September 29 – The first organised street lighting is introduced by the city of London in England, as Edward Hemming begins carrying out his contract to be paid for lighting an oil lamp "at every tenth house on main streets between 6 PM and midnight between September 29 and March 25" on nights in the autumn and winter without adequate moonlight.

=== October–December ===
- October 22 – Louis XIV of France issues the Edict of Fontainebleau, which revokes the Edict of Nantes and declares Protestantism illegal, thereby depriving Huguenots of civil rights. Their Temple de Charenton-le-Pont is immediately demolished and many flee to England, Prussia and elsewhere.
- November 8 (October 29 O.S.) – The Edict of Potsdam is issued by Frederick William, Elector of Brandenburg in response to France's Edict of Fontainebleau, welcoming the Protestant Huguenots of France to resettle in eastern Germany in Brandenburg. The French Colony of Magdeburg is established on December 1 in Saxony as a community separate from Magdeburg.
- November 11 – Morean War: The Republic of Venice captures the fortress town of Igoumenitsa from the Ottoman Empire, and razes it to the ground.
- December 3 – King Charles XI of Sweden issues an order banning Jews from settling in Sweden, particularly in the capital at Stockholm "on account of the danger of the eventual influence of the Jewish religion on the pure evangelical faith."
- December 10 – In what is now Thailand, King Narai of Ayutthaya signs a treaty with representatives of France at Lopburi, allowing Roman Catholic missionaries to preach the Gospel and exempting Thai Catholics from work on Sunday, as well as appointing a special court to settle disputes between Thai Christians and non-Christians.

=== Date unknown ===
- The Chinese army of the Qing dynasty attacks a Russian post at Albazin, during the reigns of the Kangxi Emperor and the dual Russian rulers Ivan V and Peter I. The event leads to the Treaty of Nerchinsk in 1689.
- Adam Baldridge founds a pirate base at Île Sainte-Marie, Madagascar.
- Alice Molland becomes the last known person in England to be sentenced to death for witchcraft, in Exeter.
- The Old Dutch Church of Sleepy Hollow in the State of New York is constructed by the original Dutch settlers (later to become famous as the site of the rampage of the "Headless Horseman" spirit in the novel The Legend of Sleepy Hollow).

== Births ==
George Frideric Handel

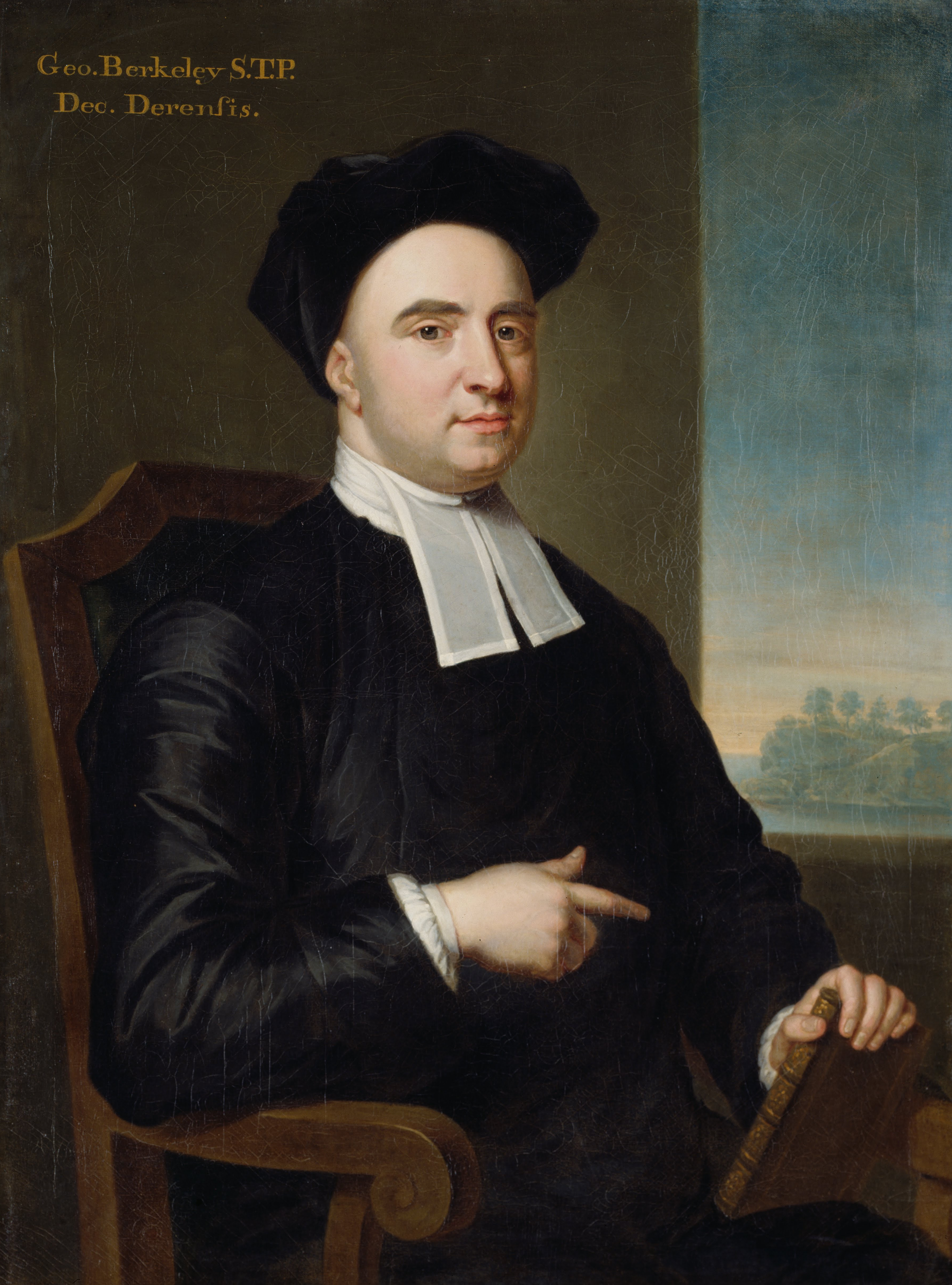
George Berkeley

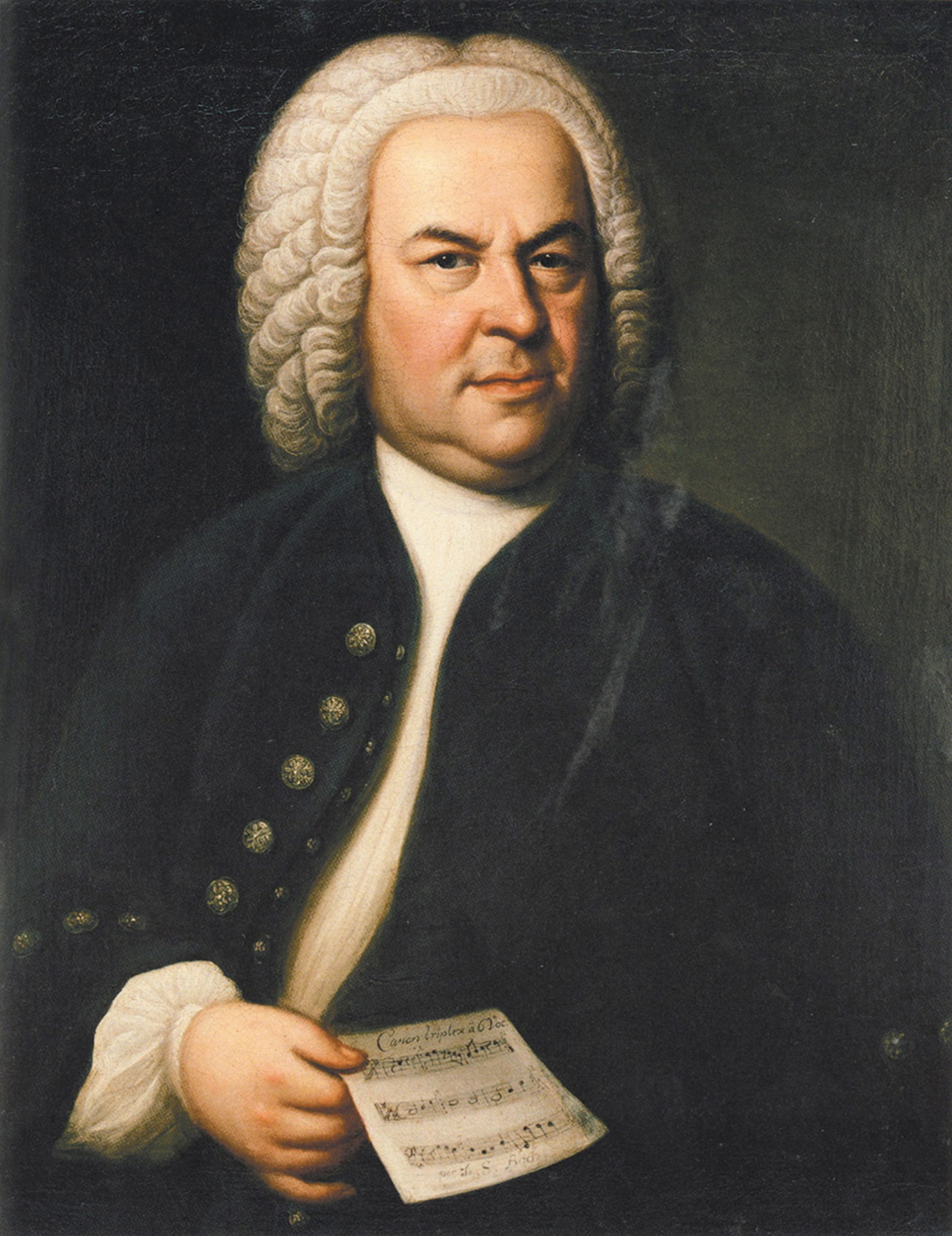
Johann Sebastian Bach

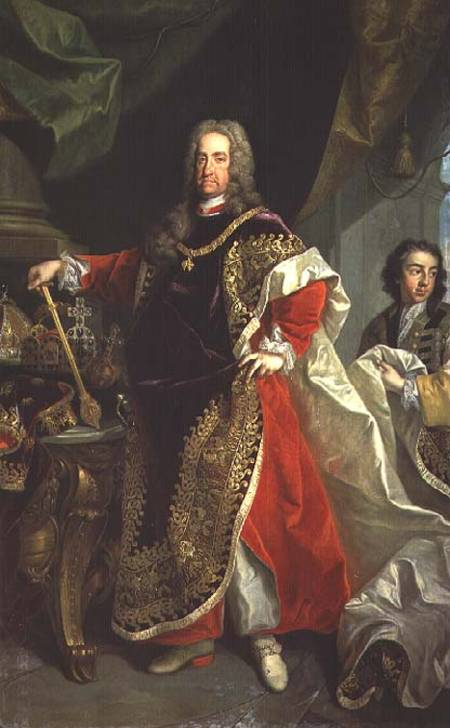
Charles VI

- January 1 – Joseph Burroughs, English minister (d. 1761)
- January 6 – Manuel de Montiano, Spanish colonial administrator (d. 1762)
- January 7
  - Jonas Alströmer, Swedish pioneer of agriculture and industry (d. 1761)
  - George Clifford III, Dutch banker and gardener (d. 1760)
- January 9 – Tiberius Hemsterhuis, Dutch philologist and critic (d. 1766)
- January 24 – Giuseppe Alessandro Furietti, Italian Catholic cardinal (d. 1764)
- February 6 – Sir John Rushout, 4th Baronet, England (d. 1775)
- February 8 – Charles-Jean-François Hénault, French writer and historian (d. 1770)
- February 9 – Francesco Loredan, Doge of Venice (d. 1762)
- February 10 – Aaron Hill (writer), English dramatist and miscellaneous writer (d. 1750)
- February 12 – George Hadley, English lawyer and amateur meteorologist (d. 1768)
- February 23 – George Frideric Handel, German composer (d. 1759)
- February 24 – Hieronymus Pez, Austrian historian (d. 1762)
- March 2 – Moses Williams (antiquarian), Welsh scholar (d. 1742)
- March 11
  - William Flower, 1st Baron Castle Durrow, Irish politician (d. 1746)
  - Jean-Pierre Nicéron, French encyclopedist (d. 1738)
- March 12 – George Berkeley, Irish philosopher (d. 1753)
- March 13 – Johann Paul Schiffelholz, German Baroque composer (d. 1758)
- March 17 – Jean-Marc Nattier, French painter (d. 1766)
- March 18 – Ralph Erskine (preacher), Scottish churchman (d. 1752)
- March 24 – John Fane, 7th Earl of Westmorland, British politician (d. 1762)
- March 26
  - Germain Louis Chauvelin, French politician (d. 1762)
  - Johann Alexander Thiele, German painter (d. 1752)
- March 27 – Simon Hatley, English sailor (d. 1723)
- March 31 – Johann Sebastian Bach, German composer (d. 1750)
- April 4 – Claude Sallier, French librarian (d. 1761)
- April 18 – Jacques-Pierre de Taffanel de la Jonquière, Marquis de la Jonquière, French admiral, colonial administrator (d. 1752)
- April 24 – Cosimo Imperiali, Italian cardinal (d. 1764)
- April 30 – Hermann Friedrich Teichmeyer, German botanist (d. 1746)
- May 4 – Akdun, Chinese Manchu statesman (d. 1756)
- May 6 – Sophia Louise of Mecklenburg-Schwerin, Prussian queen consort (d. 1735)
- May 19 – Neri Maria Corsini, Italian Catholic priest and cardinal (d. 1770)
- June 6 – Spencer Phips, Acting governor of the Province of Massachusetts Bay (d. 1757)
- June 10 – Harry Grey, 3rd Earl of Stamford, English peer (d. 1739)
- June 11 – Thomas Wedgwood III, English potter, father of Josiah Wedgwood (d. 1739)
- June 14 – Princess Charlotte Wilhelmine of Saxe-Coburg-Saalfeld, countess by marriage of Hanau-Münzenberg (d. 1767)
- June 23 – Antonio Bernacchi, Italian opera singer (d. 1756)
- June 24 – Hans von Lehwaldt, German general (d. 1768)
- June 30
  - John Gay, English writer (d. 1732)
  - Dominikus Zimmermann, German Rococo architect, stuccoist (d. 1766)
- July 3 – Sir Robert Rich, 4th Baronet, British cavalry officer (d. 1768)
- July 22 – Henrik Magnus von Buddenbrock, Swedish general, noble (d. 1743)
- July 28 – Richard Newport (MP) (d. 1716)
- August 6 – Martin Bouquet, French Benedictine monk and historian (d. 1754)
- August 7 – Claude Lamoral, 6th Prince of Ligne, Austrian field marshal (d. 1766)
- August 8 – Claude Joseph Geoffroy, brother of Étienne François Geoffroy (d. 1752)
- August 15 – Jacob Theodor Klein, German scholar (d. 1759)
- August 18 – Brook Taylor, English mathematician (d. 1731)
- September 2 – Christiane Charlotte of Nassau-Ottweiler, Countess, later Landgravine of Hesse-Homburg (d. 1761)
- September 3 – Charles Powlett, 3rd Duke of Bolton (d. 1754)
- September 4 – Johann Adolf II, Duke of Saxe-Weissenfels (d. 1746)
- September 14 – Didier Diderot, French craftsman (d. 1759)
- September 16 – Daniel Gottlieb Messerschmidt, German scientist (d. 1735)
- September 17
  - Joshua Allen, 2nd Viscount Allen, Irish politician (d. 1742)
  - Charles August, Prince of Nassau-Weilburg, Prince of Nassau-Weilburg (1719-1753) (d. 1753)
  - Robert Marsham, 1st Baron Romney, British politician (d. 1724)
  - Uvedale Tomkins Price, British politician (d. 1764)
- September 20 – Giuseppe Matteo Alberti, Italian Baroque composer and violinist (d. 1751)
- September 29 – George Brudenell, 3rd Earl of Cardigan (d. 1732)
- October 1 – Charles VI, Holy Roman Emperor (d. 1740)
- October 13 – Henri François Le Dran, French surgeon (d. 1770)
- October 15 – Diederik van Domburg, 23rd Governor of Zeylan, during the Dutch period in Ceylon (d. 1736)
- October 21 – George Forbes, 3rd Earl of Granard, English Royal Navy admiral (d. 1765)
- October 26 – Domenico Scarlatti, Italian composer (d. 1757)
- October 28 – Hans Gram (historian), Danish historian (d. 1748)
- October 31 – John Murray, 2nd Earl of Dunmore, Scottish soldier and peer (d. 1752)
- November 3 – François Roettiers, Flemish engraver, medallist, painter, sculptor (d. 1742)
- November 5 – Peter Angelis, French painter (d. 1734)
- November 7
  - Jared Eliot, Connecticut farmer, author on horticulture (d. 1763)
  - Georg Lenck, German musician (d. 1744)
- November 10 – Duncan Forbes, Lord Culloden, Scottish politician, judge (d. 1747)
- November 11
  - Florida Cevoli, Italian Capuchin Poor Clare (d. 1767)
  - Jean Charles de Saint-Nectaire, French general (d. 1771)
- November 15 – Balthasar Denner, German artist (d. 1749)
- November 17 – Pierre Gaultier de Varennes, sieur de La Vérendrye, French Canadian military officer (d. 1749)
- November 24 – Princess Dorothea of Schleswig-Holstein-Sonderburg-Beck, German noble (d. 1761)
- November 25 – Eiler Hagerup d.e., Norwegian bishop (d. 1743)
- November 29 – John Willes (judge), English lawyer (d. 1761)
- December 6 – Marie Adélaïde of Savoy, wife of Louis, Duke of Burgundy (d. 1712)
- December 8 – Johann Maria Farina, Italian-born German perfumier (d. 1766)
- December 12 – Lodovico Giustini, Italian composer (d. 1743)
- December 17 – Thomas Tickell, minor English poet and man of letters (d. 1740)
- date unknown
  - Henri-Guillaume Hamal, Walloon musician and composer (d. 1752)
  - Antoinette Larcher, French engraver (d. unknown)
  - Aldegonde Jeanne Pauli, banker in the Austrian Netherlands (d. 1761)
  - Mary Read, English-born pirate (d. 1721)
  - Marie Wulf, Danish Pietist leader (d. 1738)

== Deaths ==
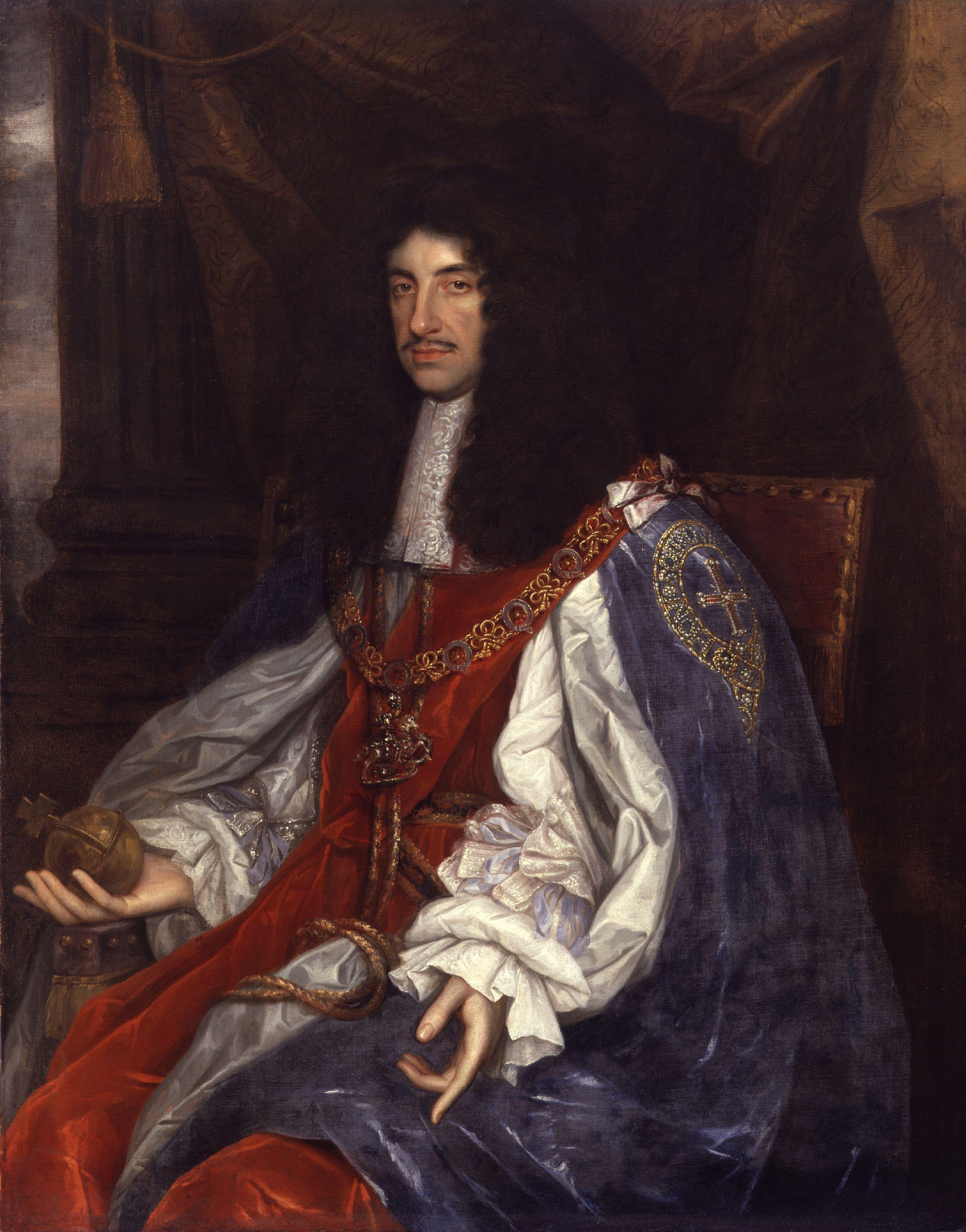
King Charles II of England

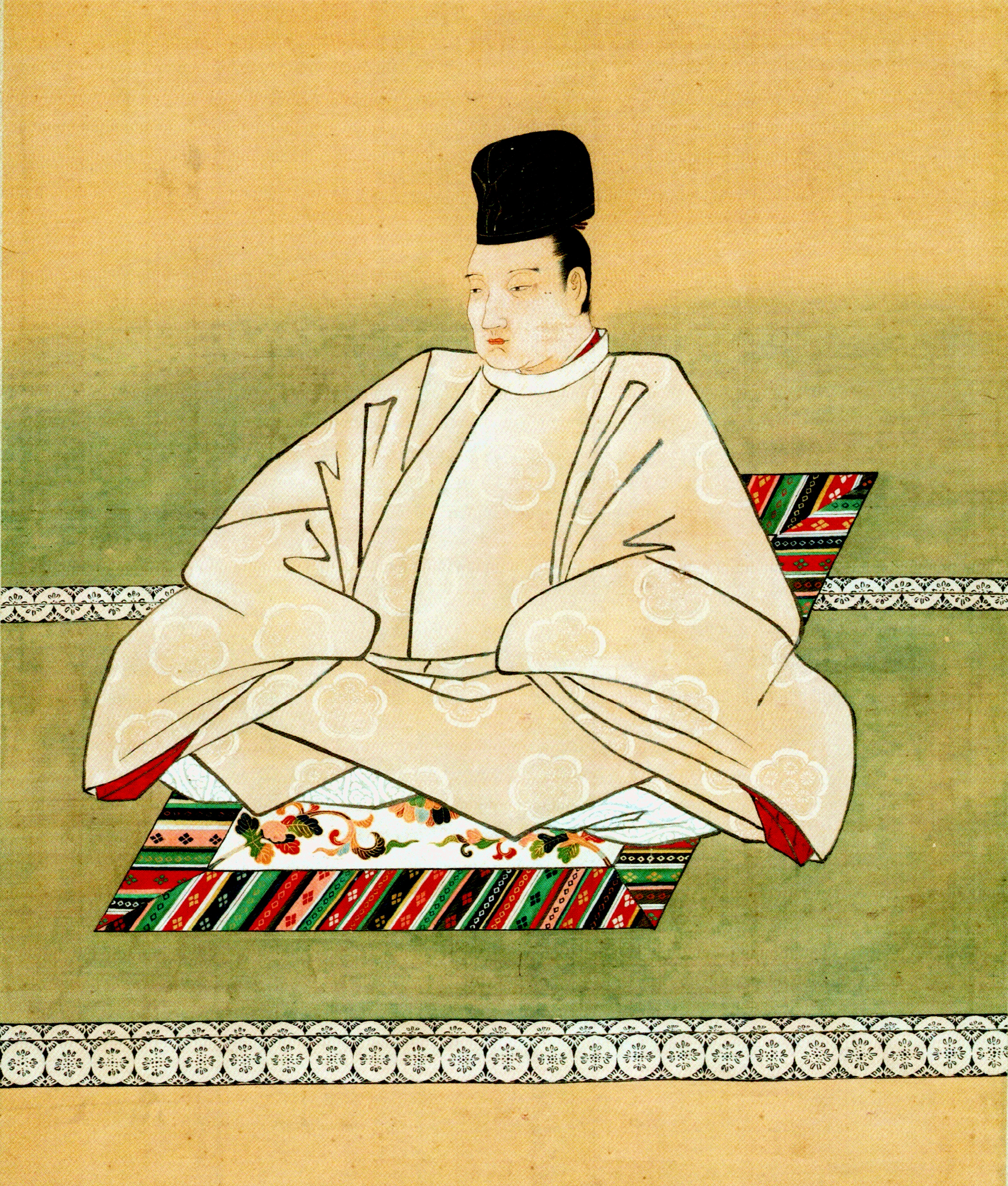
Emperor Go-Sai

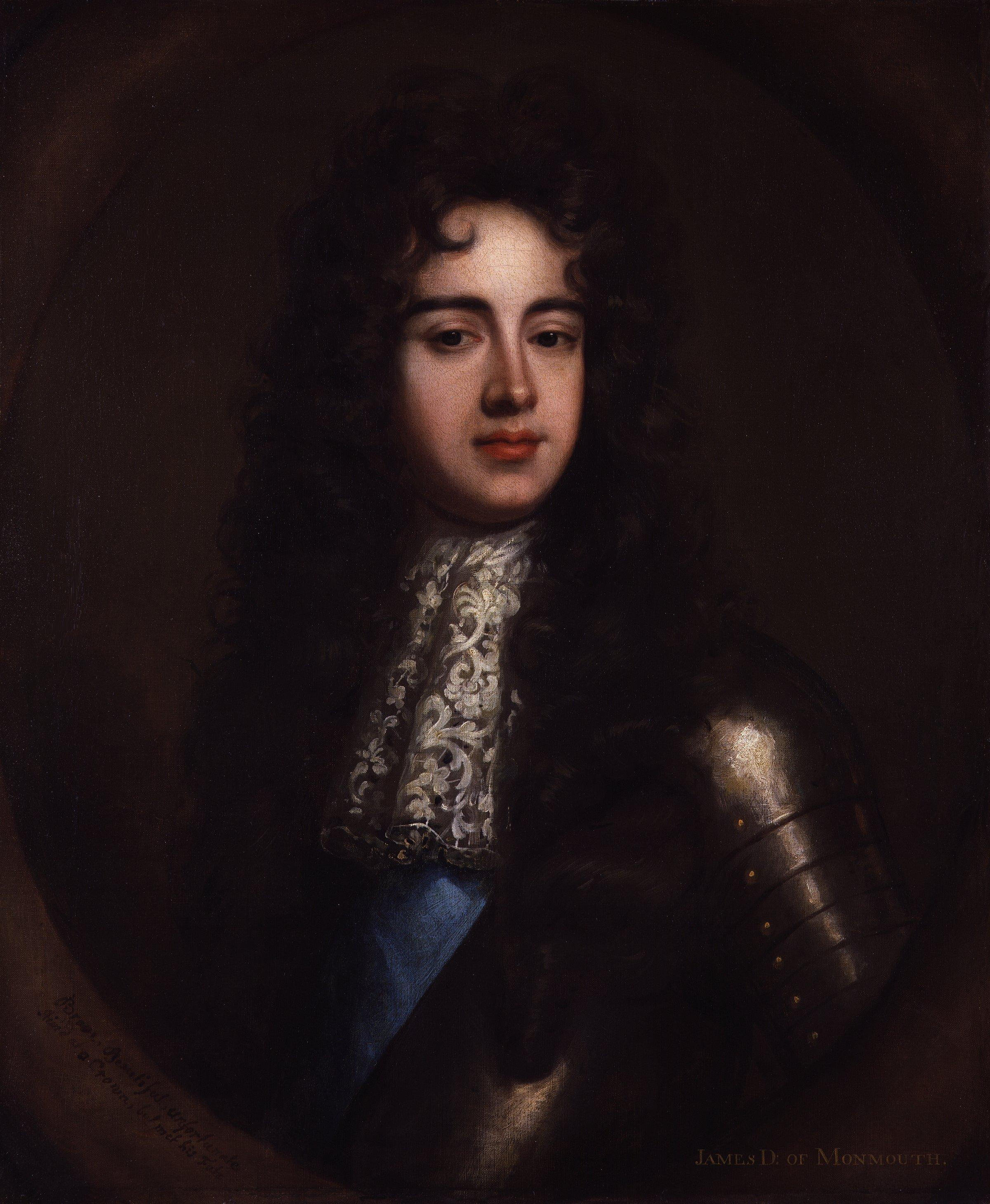
James Scott

- January 2 – Harbottle Grimston, English politician (b. 1603)
- January 13 – Daniello Bartoli, Italian Jesuit priest (b. 1608)
- February 6 – King Charles II of England, Scotland and Ireland (b. 1630)
- February 11 – David Teniers III, Flemish painter (b. 1638)
- February 20 – Sophie Amalie of Brunswick-Lüneburg, Danish queen (b. 1628)
- February 24
  - Archduchess Isabella Clara of Austria, Austrian archduchess (b. 1629)
  - Charles Howard, 1st Earl of Carlisle, English politician and military leader (b. 1629)
- March 6 – Sir Thomas Spencer, 3rd Baronet, English Member of Parliament (b. 1639)
- March 7 – Giles Hungerford, English politician (b. 1614)
- March 9 – Carpoforo Tencalla, Swiss-Italian Baroque painter of canvases and frescoes (b. 1623)
- March 11 – Klara Izabella Pacowa, politically active Polish court official (b. 1631)
- March 17 – Sir Richard Bulkeley, 1st Baronet, Irish politician (b. 1634)
- March 19 – René-François de Sluse, Walloon mathematician (b. 1622)
- March 22 – Emperor Go-Sai of Japan (b. 1638)
- March 25 – Nicolas Robert, French painter (b. 1614)
- March 30 – Friedrich Casimir, Count of Hanau-Lichtenberg (1641–1680) and Hanau-Münzenberg (1642–1680) (b. 1623)
- March 31 – Juan Hidalgo de Polanco, Spanish composer (b. 1614)
- April – Adriaen van Ostade, Dutch painter and engraver (b. 1610)
- April 5 – Samuel Sandys, English politician (b. 1615)
- April 14 – Thomas Otway, English dramatist (b. 1652)
- May 11 – Margaret Wilson (Scottish martyr) (b. c. 1667)
- May 25 – Sir John Marsham, 1st Baronet, English politician (b. 1602)
- May 26 – Karl II, Elector Palatine (b. 1651)
- June 10 – Henry Goring, English politician (b. 1646)
- June 16 – Anne Killigrew, English poet and painter (b. 1660)
- June 26 – John Evelyn, English politician (b. 1601)
- June 30 – Archibald Campbell, 9th Earl of Argyll, Scottish peer (b. 1629)
- July 6 – Nicholas Pedley, English politician (b. 1615)
- July 15 – James Scott, 1st Duke of Monmouth, illegitimate son of Charles II of England (beheaded) (b. 1649)
- July 28 – Henry Bennet, 1st Earl of Arlington, English statesman (b. 1618)
- August 8 – Giovanni Battista Salvi da Sassoferrato (b. 1609)
- September 1 – Leoline Jenkins, Welsh lawyer and diplomat (b. 1625)
- September 5 – Francis North, 1st Baron Guilford (b. 1637)
- September 9 – Richard Ingoldsby, English politician (b. 1617)
- September 17 – Arthur Spry, English politician (b. 1612)
- September 24 – Gustaf Otto Stenbock, Swedish soldier and politician (b. 1614)
- October 1 – Kanō Yasunobu, Japanese painter of the Kanō school of painting, during the Edo period (b. 1614)
- October 3
  - Juan Carreño de Miranda, Spanish artist (b. 1614)
  - Johann Heinrich Roos, Dutch painter (b. 1631)
- October 12
  - Christoph Ignaz Abele, Austrian jurist (b. 1628)
  - Gerard Brandt, Dutch historian (b. 1626)
- October 23 – Yamaga Sokō, Japanese philosopher (b. 1622)
- October 29 – Anne Wharton, English poet (b. 1659)
- October 30 – Michel Le Tellier, French statesman (b. 1603)
- November 4 – Girolamo Grimaldi-Cavalleroni, Italian Catholic cardinal (b. 1597)
- November 7 – Sir William Maynard, 1st Baronet, English politician (b. 1641)
- November 9 – Louis Armand I, Prince of Conti (b. 1661)
- November 18 – George Courthope, English politician (b. 1616)
- November 28
  - Maffeo Barberini, Prince of Palestrina (b. 1631)
  - Nicolas de Neufville de Villeroy, Marshal of France (b. 1598)
- December 12 – John Pell, English mathematician (b. 1610)
- date unknown – Nalan Xingde, Chinese poet who became a scholar and officer in the Imperial Bodyguard (b. 1655)
