= 1756 =

1756 in various calendars
- Gregorian calendar: 1756; MDCCLVI
- Ab urbe condita: 2509
- Armenian calendar: 1205; ԹՎ ՌՄԵ
- Assyrian calendar: 6506
- Balinese saka calendar: 1677–1678
- Bengali calendar: 1162–1163
- Berber calendar: 2706
- British Regnal year: 29 Geo. 2 – 30 Geo. 2
- Buddhist calendar: 2300
- Burmese calendar: 1118
- Byzantine calendar: 7264–7265
- Chinese calendar: 乙亥年 (Wood Pig); 4453 or 4246 — to — 丙子年 (Fire Rat); 4454 or 4247
- Coptic calendar: 1472–1473
- Discordian calendar: 2922
- Ethiopian calendar: 1748–1749
- Hebrew calendar: 5516–5517
- Hindu calendars
- Vikram Samvat: 1812–1813
- Shaka Samvat: 1677–1678
- Kali Yuga: 4856–4857
- Holocene calendar: 11756
- Igbo calendar: 756–757
- Iranian calendar: 1134–1135
- Islamic calendar: 1169–1170
- Japanese calendar: Hōreki 6 (宝暦６年)
- Javanese calendar: 1681–1682
- Julian calendar: Gregorian minus 11 days
- Korean calendar: 4089
- Minguo calendar: 156 before ROC 民前156年
- Nanakshahi calendar: 288
- Thai solar calendar: 2298–2299
- Tibetan calendar: ཤིང་མོ་ཕག་ལོ་ (female Wood-Boar); 1882 or 1501 or 729 — to — མེ་ཕོ་བྱི་བ་ལོ་ (male Fire-Rat); 1883 or 1502 or 730

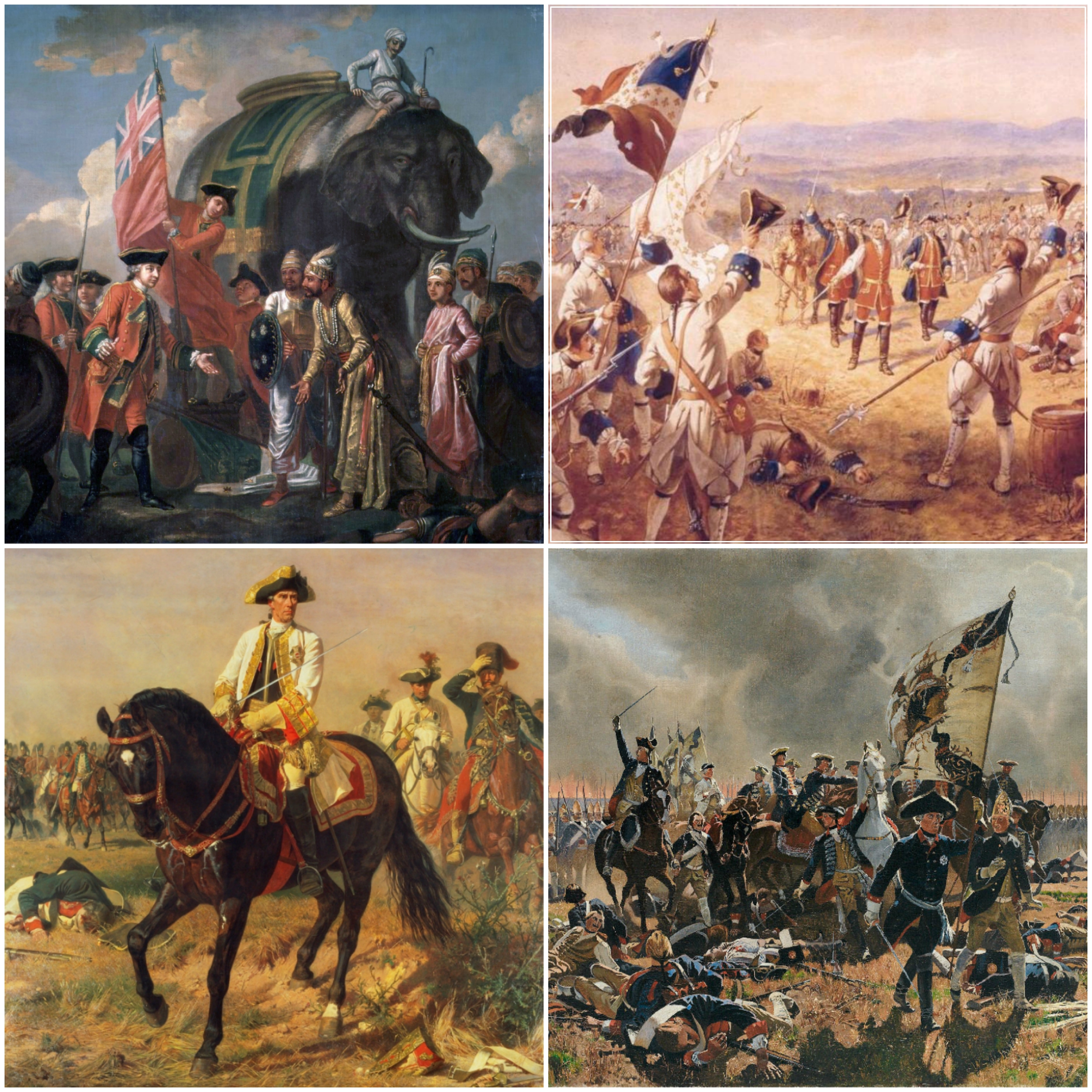
May 17: The Seven Years' War begins.

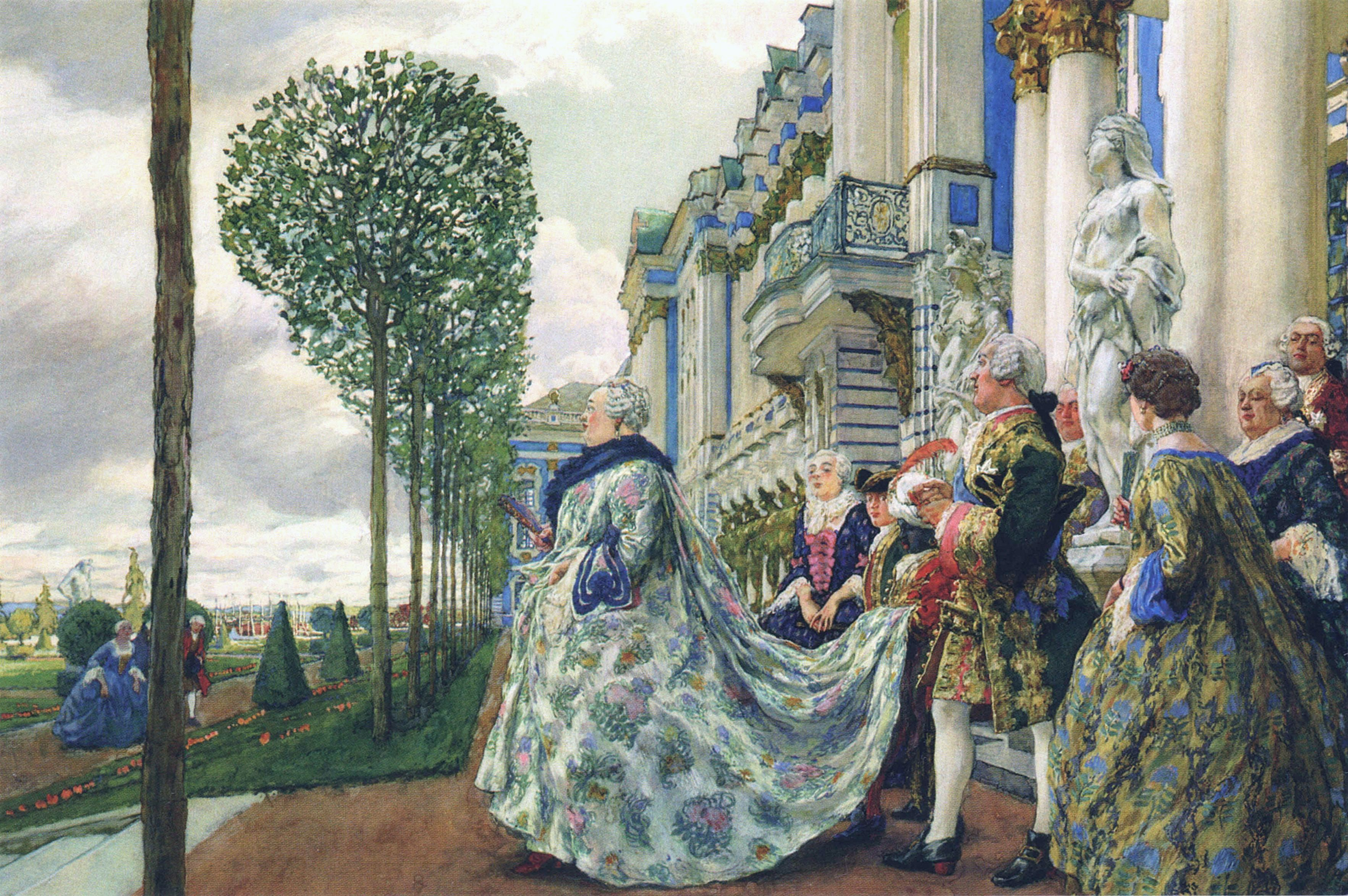
July 30: Empress Elizabeth of Russia opens the newly built Catherine Palace.

1756 (MDCCLVI) was a leap year starting on Thursday of the Gregorian calendar and a leap year starting on Monday of the Julian calendar, the 1756th year of the Common Era (CE) and Anno Domini (AD) designations, the 756th year of the 2nd millennium, the 56th year of the 18th century, and the 7th year of the 1750s decade. As of the start of 1756, the Gregorian calendar was 11 days ahead of the Julian calendar, which remained in localized use until 1923.

== Events ==
=== January–March ===
- January 16 – The Treaty of Westminster is signed between Great Britain and Prussia, guaranteeing the neutrality of the Electorate of Hanover, controlled by King George II of Great Britain.
- January 27 – Wolfgang Amadeus Mozart is born in Salzburg, Austria, to Anna Maria and Leopold Mozart.
- February 7 – Guaraní War: The leader of the Guaraní rebels, Sepé Tiaraju, is killed in a skirmish with Spanish and Portuguese troops.
- February 10 – The massacre of the Guaraní rebels in the Jesuit reduction of Caaibaté takes place in Brazil after their leader, Noicola Neenguiru, defies an ultimatum to surrender by 2:00 in the afternoon. On February 7, Neenguiru's predecessor Sepé Tiaraju has been killed in a brief skirmish. As two o'clock arrives, a combined force of Spanish and Portuguese troops makes an assault on the first of the Seven Towns established as Jesuit missions. Defending their town with cannons made out of bamboo, the Guaraní suffer 1,511 dead, compared to three Spaniards and two Portuguese killed in battle.
- February 14 – Battle of Vijaydurg: The Maratha Navy, that has controlled the western coast of India for the Maratha Empire for more than a century, is destroyed by British attackers fighting for the East India Company. On orders of Royal Navy Admiral Charles Watson, the British capture a Maratha ship (the former British warship HMS Restoration), set it on fire, and then float the burning vessel into the Vijaydurg Port where most of Maratha Admiral Tulaji Angre's ships are anchored. The fire soon spreads to the other ships, destroying one large warship armed with 74 cannons, eight gurabs of 200 tonnes apiece, and sixty galbat ships.
- March 17 – St. Patrick's Day is celebrated in New York City for the first time (at the Crown and Thistle Tavern).

=== April–June ===
- April 1 – Yirmisekizzade Mehmed Said Pasha resigns as Grand Vizier of the Ottoman Empire. He is replaced by Köse Bahir Mustafa Pasha, who has been Grand Vizier from 1752 to 1755.
- April 12 – Siege of Fort St Philip begins when the French under Armand de Vignerot du Plessis, Duke of Richelieu, land near Port Mahón on Menorca and besiege the British garrison here in a prelude to the Seven Years' War.
- May 17 – The Seven Years' War formally begins, when Great Britain declares war on France.
- May 20 – Seven Years' War: Battle of Minorca – The British fleet under John Byng is defeated by the French under Roland-Michel Barrin de La Galissonière.
- June 20 – A garrison of the British Army in India is imprisoned in the Black Hole of Calcutta.
- June 22 – The Coup of 1756, an attempted coup d'état planned by Queen Louisa Ulrika of Sweden, to abolish the rule of the Riksdag of the Estates and reinstate absolute monarchy in Sweden with the support of the Hovpartiet, is exposed and subdued.
- June 25 – The Marine Society is founded in London, the world's oldest seafarers' charity.
- June 29 – Seven Years' War: Siege of Fort St Philip at Port Mahón: The British garrison in Menorca surrenders to the French after two months' siege by the Duke of Richelieu.

=== July–September ===
- July 30 – Bartolomeo Rastrelli presents the newly built Catherine Palace at Tsarskoye Selo to Empress Elizabeth of Russia and her court.
- August 14 – Seven Years' War: French and Indian War – Fort Oswego falls to the French.
- August 29 – King Frederick the Great of Prussia invades Saxony, beginning the Third Silesian War within the Seven Years' War on the European continent.
- September 2 – Abu l-Hasan Ali I, Bey of Tunis is forcibly removed after 23 years as the ruler of the North African emirate by his cousins, who are avenging the overthrow and execution of their father, Husayn in 1735. Hasan Ali surrenders to the rebels and is imprisoned in Algiers, then executed on September 22 on orders of the new Bey of Tunis, Muhammad I ar-Rashid.

=== October–December ===
- October 1 – Seven Years' War: Battle of Lobositz – Frederick defeats an Austrian army under Marshal Maximilian Ulysses, Reichsgraf von Browne.
- October 14 – An "Agreement of Friendship and Trade" is signed by Sultan Osman III and King Frederick V. Denmark appoints an extraordinary representative to the Ottoman Empire.
- November 16 – Thomas Pelham-Holles, the Duke of Newcastle, is forced to resign as Prime Minister of Great Britain after the British lose the Battle of Minorca to the French. The office of Prime Minister remains vacant for eight months with William Pitt and the Duke of Devonshire leading the cabinet.
- December – Seven Years' War – French and Indian War: Militias of the Royal Colony of North Carolina build a fort on the province's western frontier to protect it against natives allied with the French. The fort is named Fort Dobbs in honor of North Carolina Governor Arthur Dobbs, who persuaded the North Carolina legislature to fund the construction a year earlier.
- December 14 – Rev. John Home's tragedy Douglas is performed for the first time in Edinburgh, with overwhelming success, in spite of the opposition of the local church presbytery, who summon Alexander Carlyle to answer for having attended its representation. However, it fails in its early promise to set up a new Scottish dramatic tradition.

=== Date unknown ===
- King Frederick the Great of Prussia forces his country's peasants to grow the unpopular and obscure potato.
- The first chocolate-candy factory begins operations in Germany.
- The town of Gus-Khrustalny is established in Russia, with the setting up of a crystal glass factory.
- Leopold Mozart publishes his book on his method for learning to play the violin, Versuch einer gründlichen Violinschule.

== Births ==
- January 19 – Guillaume-Antoine Olivier, French entomologist (d. 1814)

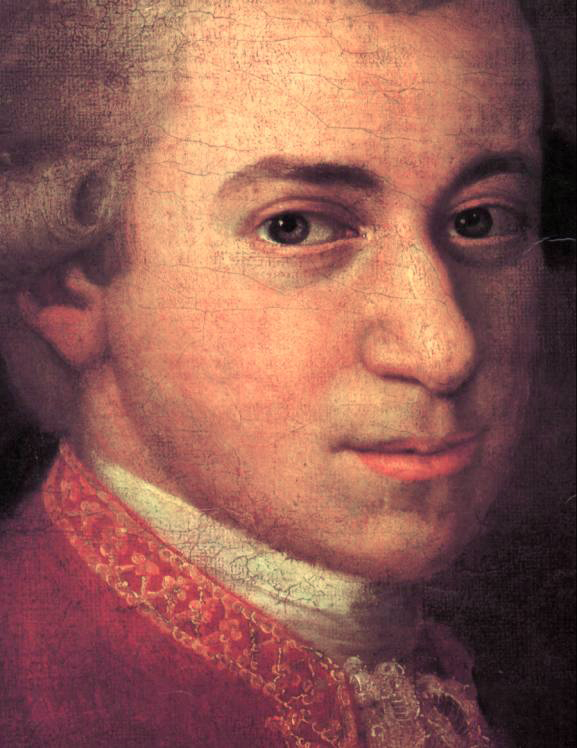
Wolfgang Amadeus Mozart

- January 27 – Wolfgang Amadeus Mozart, Austrian composer (d. 1791)
- February 6 - Aaron Burr, American politician (d. 1836)
- February 20 – Angelica Schuyler Church, American socialite, daughter of Genl.Philip Schuyler, sister to Elizabeth Schuyler Hamilton (d. 1814)
- March 3 – William Godwin, English writer (d. 1836)
- March 4 – Sir Henry Raeburn, Scottish painter (d. 1823)
- May 10 – Singu Min, king of Myanmar (k. 1782)
- May 18 – Ignaz Aurelius Fessler, Hungarian-born court councillor, minister to Czar Alexander I of Russia (d. 1839)
- May 27 – King Maximilian I Joseph of Bavaria (d. 1825)
- May 31 – Abbé Faria, Luso-Goan Catholic monk, student of hypnotism (d. 1819)
- June 6 – John Trumbull, American painter (d. 1843)
- June 20 – Joseph Martin Kraus, German-Swedish composer (d. 1792)
- July 7 – Gustaf Adolf Reuterholm, Swedish statesman (d. 1813)
- July 31 – Dheeran Chinnamalai, Tamil king (d. 1805)
- August 1 – Pierre Louis Prieur, French politician (d. 1827)
- August 29 – Heinrich Graf von Bellegarde, Austrian field marshal, statesman (d. 1845)
- September 7 – Willem Bilderdijk, Dutch author (d. 1831)
- September 13 – Benedikte Naubert, German writer (d. 1819)
- September 23 – John Loudon McAdam, Scottish engineer, road-builder (d. 1836)
- October 21 – Philippine Engelhard, German writer, scholar (d. 1831)
- November 3 – Pierre Laromiguière, French philosopher (d. 1837)
- December 7 – John Littlejohn, British-American sheriff and Methodist preacher (d. 1836)
- date unknown
  - Maria Pellegrina Amoretti, Italian lawyer (d. 1787)
  - Gideon Morris, trans-Appalachian pioneer (d. 1798)
  - Hilchen Sommerschild, Norwegian educator (d. 1831)

== Deaths ==
- January 17 – Isabella Simons, banker in the Austrian Netherlands (b. 1694)
- January 18 – Francis George of Schönborn-Buchheim (b. 1682)
- February 22 – Akdun, Chinese Manchu statesman (b. 1685)

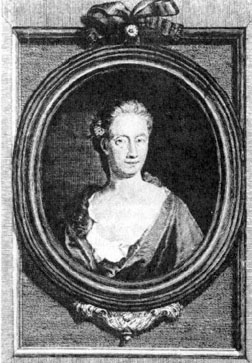
Eliza Haywood

- February 25 – Eliza Haywood, English actress, writer (b. 1693)
- March 1 – Antonio Bernacchi, Italian opera singer (b. 1685)
- April 4 – Marie Sophie de Courcillon, French noblewoman and Duchess of Rohan-Rohan, Princess of Soubise by marriage (b. 1713)
- April 10 – Giacomo Antonio Perti, Italian composer (b. 1661)
- April 18 – Jacques Cassini, French astronomer (b. 1677)
- July 1 – Giambattista Nolli, Italian architect (b. 1701)
- July 24 – George Vertue, English engraver, antiquary (b. 1684)
- September 8 – Jonathan Nichols, Jr., Rhode Island colonial deputy governor (b. 1712)
- September 22 – Abu l-Hasan Ali I, ruler of Tunisia (b. 1688)
- October 13 – John Henley, English minister (b. 1692)
- October 15 – William Grimston, 1st Viscount Grimston, Irish noble (b. 1684)
- October 26 – Roland-Michel Barrin de La Galissonière, governor of New France (b. 1693)
- October 28 – Charles Somerset, 4th Duke of Beaufort (b. 1709)
- December 8 – William Stanhope, 1st Earl of Harrington, English statesman, diplomat (b. c. 1690)
- December 11 – Maria Amalia, Holy Roman Empress (b. 1701)
- date unknown
  - Bernard Accama, Dutch painter (b. 1697)
  - Frehat Bat Avraham, Jewish Poet
  - William Beverley, American legislator, civil servant, planter, and landowner (b. 1696)
