= Aldegonde Jeanne Pauli =

Dutch banker

Aldegonde Jeanne Pauli (1685–1761), was a politically influential banker in the Austrian Netherlands.

She married the merchant, maritime insurer and financier Pietro Proli, and took over the Proli Bank when he died in 1733. She handled most of the loans of the imperial government in Vienna in the Low countries and was famous for her business skills. She left it to her son Charles, but the power of the government loans in the Austrian Netherlands moved from the Proli bank to the Nettine Bank of Barbe de Nettine under his leadership.

== See also ==
- Isabella Simons

== Sources ==
- Béatrice Craig: Women and Business Since 1500: Invisible Presences in Europe and North America?
