= Timeline of Magdeburg =

The following is a timeline of the history of the city of Magdeburg, Germany.

== Prior to 19th century ==
- 5th to 7th century - the city was already fortified; shown by excavations by Ernst Nickel and other archaeologists, e.g. a double ditch system.
- 937 - Mauritiuskloster (monastery) founded by Otto the Great.
- 968
  - Catholic Archbishopric of Magdeburg established.
  - Kloster Berge (monastery) founded.
- 1010 - Volksfest begins.
- 1018 - Kloster Unser Lieben Frauen (monastery) founded.
- 1188 - Fire.
- 1290 - Statue of Otto the Great erected in front of the town-hall.
- 1294 - Magdeburg rights in effect.
- 1297 - Freischiessen begins.
- 1480 - Sankt-Petri-Kirche (Magdeburg) (church) rebuilt.
- 1520 - Magdeburg Cathedral towers built.
- 1524 - Protestant reformation.
- 1525 - Stadtbibliothek Magdeburg (library) founded.
- 1550
  - Magdeburg Confession issued in response to the Augsburg Interim.
  - Magdeburg besieged by forces of Maurice, Elector of Saxony.
- 1631 - May: Sack of Magdeburg during the Thirty Years' War; city burned by Tilly.^{(de)}
- 1680 - Duchy of Magdeburg established.
- 1685 - Huguenot refugee French Colony of Magdeburg develops.
- 1691 - Rathaus Magdeburg (city hall) rebuilt.
- 1702 - Magdeburg Citadel built.
- 1721 - Fort Berge construction begins.
- 1780 - Population: 22,389.^{(de)}
- 1783 - Harmonie-Gesellschaft (Magdeburg) (cultural association) founded.

== 19th century ==
- 1806 - Siege of Magdeburg (1806) by French forces; Magdeburg "annexed to the kingdom of Westphalia."
- 1814 - Magdeburg becomes part of Prussia again.
- 1815 - Administrative Regierungsbezirk Magdeburg (region) created.
- 1818 - Prussian IV Army Corps headquartered in Magdeburg.
- 1824 - Herrenkrugpark expanded.
- 1825 - Industrie- und Handelskammer Magdeburg (chamber of commerce) founded.

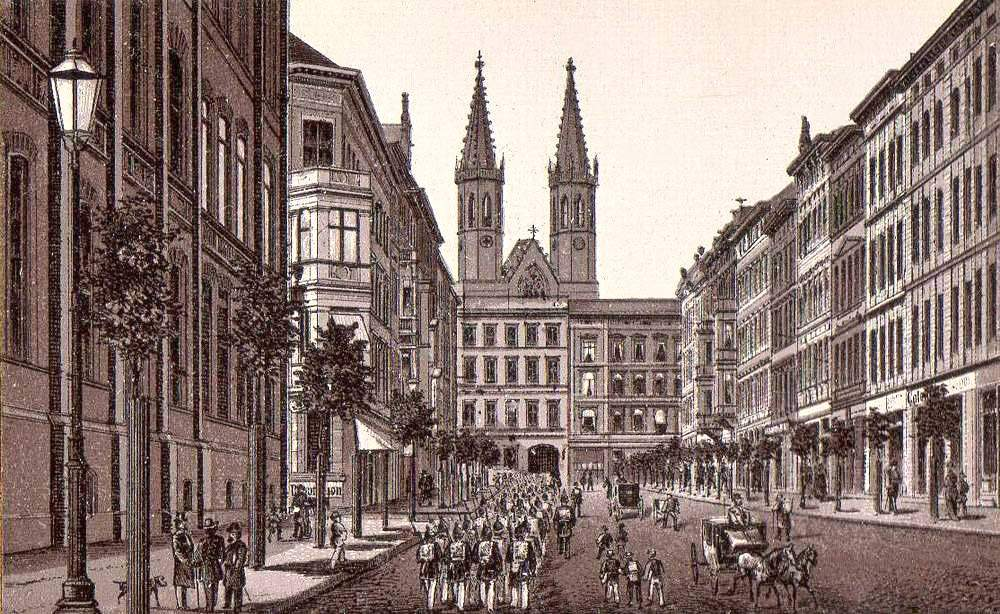
Magdeburg in the 1830s

- 1840
  - Magdeburg-Leipzig railway built.
  - Population: 50,898.^{(de)}
- 1843
  - Magdeburg–Thale railway begins operating.
  - Magdeburger Börse (stock exchange) founded.
- 1846 - Berlin–Magdeburg railway begins operating.
- 1851 - Magdeburg Synagogue built.
- 1855 - Grusonwerk machinery manufactory begins operating in nearby Buckau.
- 1860 - Viktoriatheater (Magdeburg) opens.
- 1866 - Rathaus Magdeburg (city hall) enlarged.
- 1867 - Sudenburg becomes part of Magdeburg.
- 1873 - Magdeburg Hauptbahnhof (train station) opens.
- 1876 - Stadttheater Magdeburg (theatre) opens.
- 1877 - Soldiers' Memorial erected.
- 1885 - Population: 114,291.^{(de)}
- 1886
  - Alte Neustadt becomes part of Magdeburg.
  - Martin Luther monument (Magdeburg) erected.
- 1887 - Buckau becomes part of Magdeburg.
- 1890 - Volksstimme newspaper begins publication.
- 1895 - Population: 214,424.
- 1896
  - SV Victoria 96 Magdeburg (football club) formed.
  - Gruson-Gewächshäuser (greenhouse garden) opens.

== 20th century ==
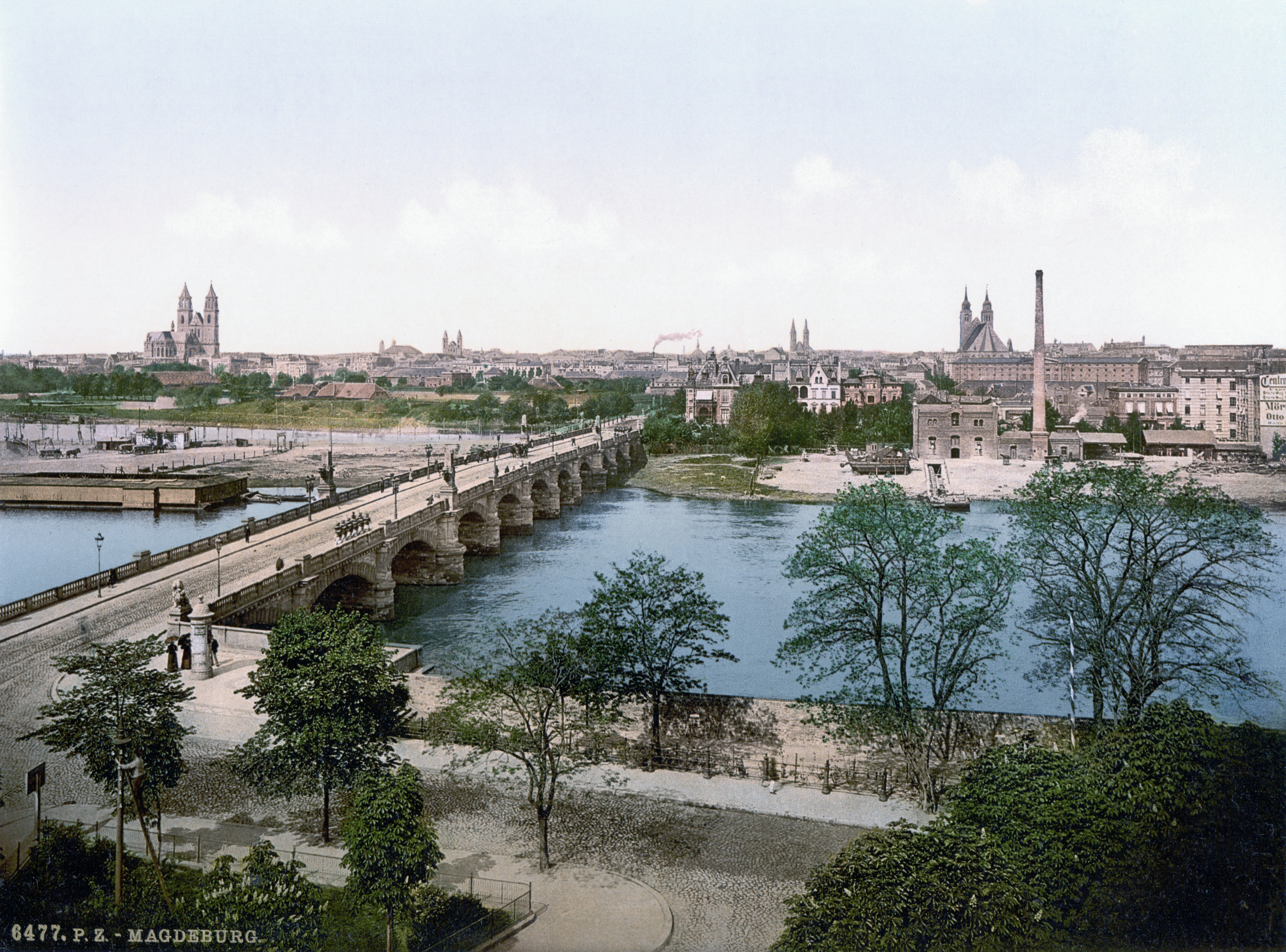
Magdeburg at the turn of the 19th and 20th centuries

- 1903 - Königsbrücke (bridge) opens.
- 1905 - Population: 240,661.
- 1906 - Kulturhistorisches Museum Magdeburg founded.
- 1907
  - Zentraltheater (theatre) opens.
  - Rathaus Magdeburg (city hall) new building constructed.
- 1908 - Rothensee becomes part of Magdeburg.
- 1910 - Cracau (Magdeburg), Fermersleben, Lemsdorf, Prester (Magdeburg), Salbke, and Westerhüsen become part of Magdeburg.
- 1917 - Polish leader Józef Piłsudski and close associate Kazimierz Sosnkowski imprisoned in Magdeburg.
- 1918 - Piłsudski and Sosnkowski released.
- 1919 - Population: 285,856.
- 1934
  - Volkspark Westerhüsen (park) opens.
  - City hosts the 1934 European Aquatics Championships.
- 1938 - November: Kristallnacht pogrom against Jews.
- 1939 - Nazi camp for Sinti and Romani people established (see also Porajmos).
- 1942 - Zwangsarbeiterlager Diana (labor camp) built.
- 1944
  - 14 June: Women subcamp of the Ravensbrück concentration camp established at the Polte ammunition factory. The prisoners were mostly Soviet, Polish, Ukrainian and Jewish.
  - 1 July: Province of Magdeburg established.
  - 1 September: Subcamp of Ravensbrück at the Polte ammunition factory converted into a subcamp of the Buchenwald concentration camp.
  - 3 November: Men subcamp of the Buchenwald concentration camp established at the Polte ammunition factory. The prisoners were mostly Jewish.
- 1945
  - 16 January: Aerial Bombing of Magdeburg on 16 January 1945 by Allied forces.
  - 13 April: Subcamps of Buchenwald at the Polte ammunition factory dissolved. Dozens of prisoners massacred by the Volkssturm and Hitler Youth. Surviving prisoners sent on death marches towards the Ravensbrück and Sachsenhausen concentration camps.
  - 18 April: City occupied by United States forces.
  - 1 July: City occupied by Soviet forces.
- 1949 - City becomes part of the German Democratic Republic.
- 1954 - Universitätsklinikum Magdeburg (hospital) and Medizinische Akademie Magdeburg (medical school) founded.
- 1955
  - Ernst Grube Stadium opens.
  - SC Magdeburg (sport club) formed.

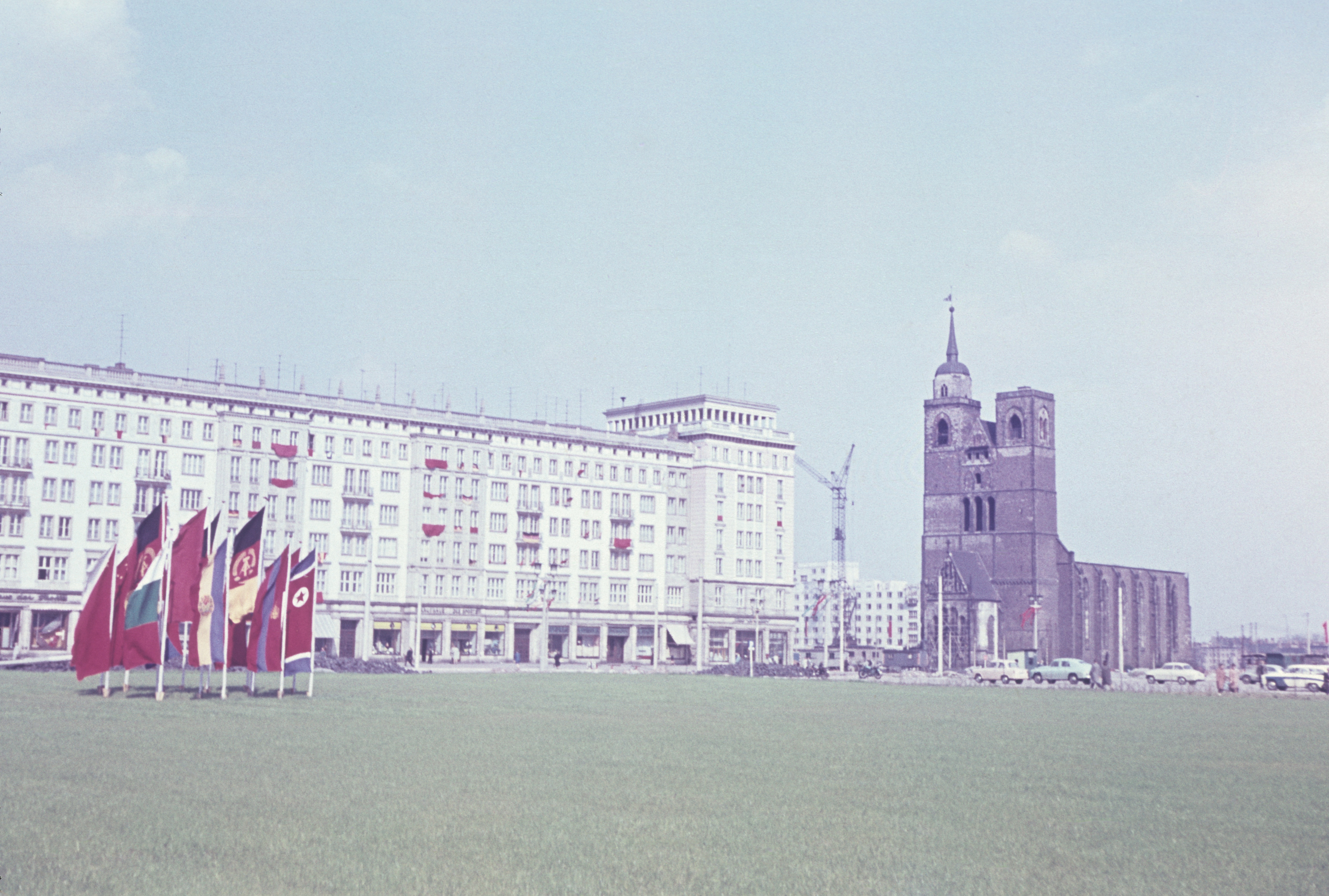
Magdeburg in 1963

- 1965
  - 1. FC Magdeburg (football club) formed.
  - Neue Strombrücke Magdeburg (bridge) opens.
- 1974 - S-Bahn Mittelelbe (city railway) begins operating.
- 1987 - Technical University Magdeburg active.
- 1990
  - City becomes part of reunited nation of Germany.
  - Wilhelm Polte becomes mayor.
- 1991
  - Regional Landtag of Saxony-Anhalt (legislature) begins meeting in Magdeburg.
  - Hochschule Magdeburg-Stendal (school) established.
- 1993 - Otto-von-Guericke University Magdeburg established.
- 1994 - Municipal election held.^{(de)}
- 1996 - Jerusalembrücke (Nordbrücke) (bridge) built.
- 1997 - GETEC Arena opens.
- 1998
  - March: Alliance '90/The Greens conference held in Magdeburg.^{(de)}
  - Allee-Center Magdeburg (shopping centre) in business on Breiter Weg (Magdeburg).
- 1999
  - Jahrtausendturm (tower) built.
  - Panoramabahn monorail begins operating.
  - National Bundesgartenschau (garden show) held in the Elbauenpark.

== 21st century ==
- 2001
  - Lutz Trümper becomes mayor.
  - Landesarchiv Sachsen-Anhalt (archives) established.
- 2003 - Magdeburg Water Bridge opens near city.
- 2006 - MDCC-Arena opens.
- 2010 - Magdeburger Regionalverkehrsverbund (transit entity) established.
- 2013 - June: Flood.
- 2015 - Population: 238,212.^{(de)}
- 2024 - Christmas market attack, killing at least 5

== See also ==
- Magdeburg history (de)
- List of mayors of Magdeburg (in German)
- List of bishops of Magdeburg (en)
- List of heritage sites in Magdeburg
- History of Saxony-Anhalt

Other cities in the state of Saxony-Anhalt:^{(de)}

- Timeline of Halle (Saale)

== Bibliography ==
=== in English ===
- "Magdeburg". Handbook for North Germany. London: J. Murray. 1877.
- "Magdeburg". Chambers's Encyclopaedia. London. 1901.
- "Magdeburg", Northern Germany (15th ed.), Leipzig: Karl Baedeker, 1910, OCLC 78390379
- "Magdeburg" . Encyclopædia Britannica. Vol. 17 (11th ed.). 1910. pp. 301–302.
- John M. Jeep, ed. (2001). "Magdeburg". Medieval Germany: an Encyclopedia. Garland Publishing. ISBN 0-8240-7644-3.
- Colum Hourihane, ed. (2012). "Magdeburg". Grove Encyclopedia of Medieval Art and Architecture. Oxford University Press. ISBN 978-0-19-539536-5.

=== in German ===
- J. A. F. Hermes; M.J. Weigelt (1842). Historisch-geographisch-statistisch-topographisches Handbuch vom Regierungsbezirke Magdeburg (in German). Magdeburg: W. Heinrichshofen.
- Magdeburg. Die Chroniken der deutschen Städte (in German). Vol. 7, 27. Leipzig: S. Hirzel Verlag. 1869–1899 – via HathiTrust.
- Max Dittmar (1885). Beiträge zur geschichte der stadt Magdeburg in den ersten jahren nach ihrer zerstörung 1631 (in German). Halle: Max Niemeyer.
- Waldemar Kawerau (1886). Aus Magdeburgs Vergangenheit (in German). Halle.
- Karl von Hegel (1891). "Magdeburg". Städte und Gilden der germanischen Völker im Mittelalter (in German). Vol. 2. Leipzig: Duncker & Humblot. hdl:2027/wu.89094689700 – via HathiTrust.
- "Zeittafel: Magdeburger Geschichte (timeline)", Parkanlagen Stadt Magdeburg I (in German), Landeshauptstadt Magdeburg, 1995, pp. 16–23
- Helmut Asmus; Manfred Wille (2000). 1200 Jahre Magdeburg: von der Kaiserpfalz zur Landeshauptstadt: eine Stadtgeschichte (in German). Scriptum. ISBN 3933046165. 2000–2009. (4 vols.)
- Magdeburger Biographisches Lexikon (in German). 2002.
- Sachsen-Anhalt 1: Regierungsbezirk Magdeburg. Handbuch der Deutschen Kunstdenkmäler (in German). 2002.
- Wolfgang Adam; Siegrid Westphal, eds. (2012). "Magdeburg". Handbuch kultureller Zentren der Frühen Neuzeit: Städte und Residenzen im alten deutschen Sprachraum (in German). De Gruyter. pp. 1349–1390. ISBN 978-3-11-029555-9.
