= Timeline of Halle (Saale) =

The following is a timeline of the history of the city of Halle an der Saale, Germany.

== Prior to 19th century ==
- 981 – Town chartered by Otto II, Holy Roman Emperor.
- 1281 – Halle was an important member of the Hanseatic League
- 1388 – St. Moritz, Halle (church) construction begins.
- 1478 – Halle leaves the Hanseatic League.
- 1484 – Moritzburg (Halle) (castle) construction begins.
- 1506 – Roter Turm (Halle) (tower) built.
- 1552 – Marienbibliothek, Halle (Saale) (library) founded.
- 1554 – Marktkirche Unser Lieben Frauen (church) built.
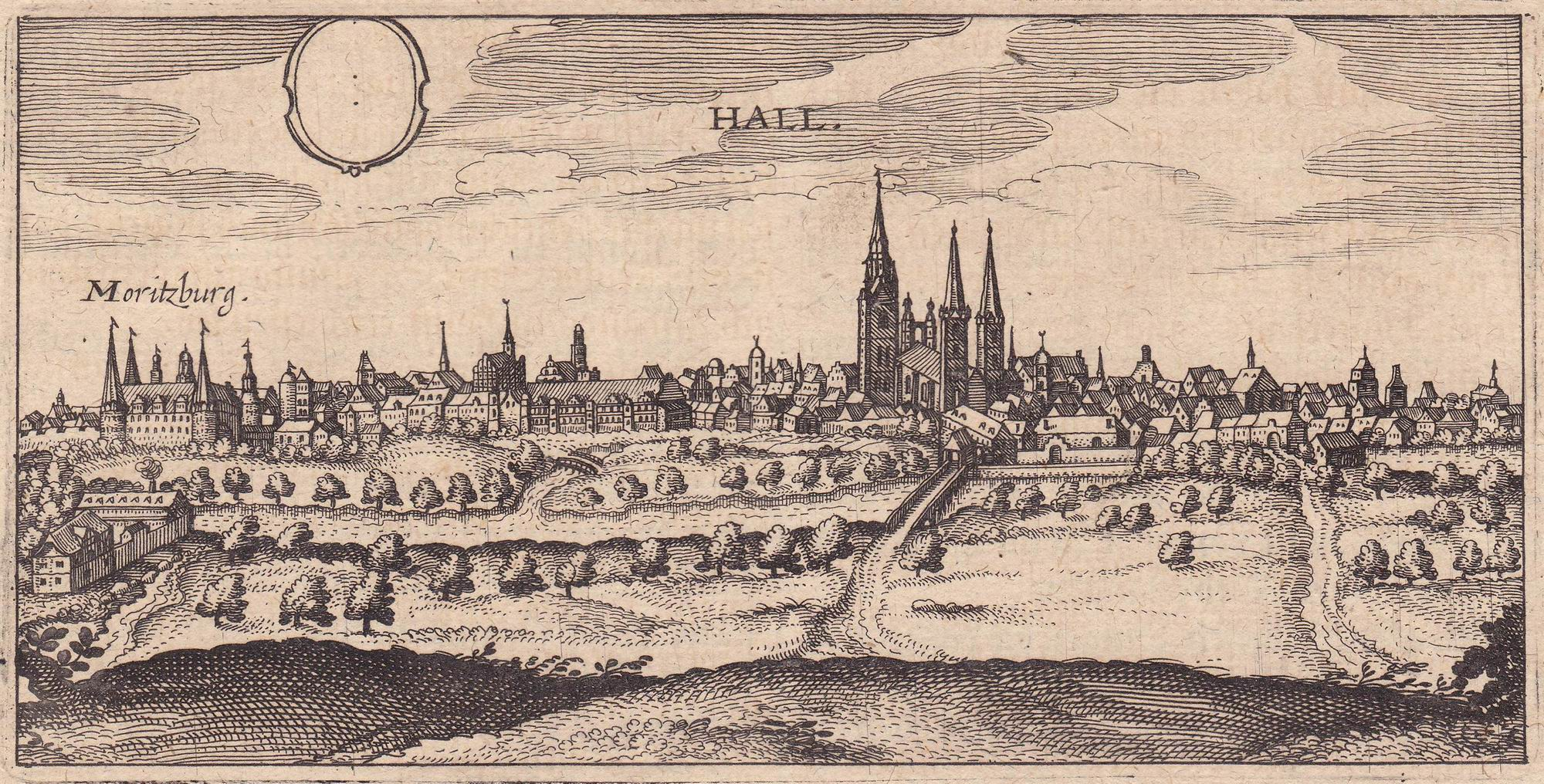
  Hall. - by Hulsius in- Gottfried, Inventarivm Sueciae - 1632
- 1648 – After the Peace of Westphalia, the city came into the possession of the House of Brandenburg
- 1685 – Future composer George Frideric Handel born in Halle.
- 1694 – University founded.
- 1696 – University library founded.
- 1751 – Population: 13,460.^{(de)}

== 19th century ==
- 1806 – 17 October: Battle of Halle fought during the War of the Fourth Coalition; French win.
- 1813 – Town was taken by the Prussians.
- 1815 – University of Halle-Wittenberg active.
- 1819 – Population: 23,408.^{(de)}
- 1870 – Gewerblichen Zeichenschule (school) founded.
- 1872 – Halle–Cottbus railway begins operating.
- 1880 – Population: 71,484.
- 1882 – Horse-drawn tram begins operating.
- 1885 – Art museum Städtisches Museum für Kunst und Kunstgewerbe der Stadt Halle (Saale) founded, today: Kunstmuseum Moritzburg Halle (Saale)
- 1886 – Stadttheater built.
- 1890 – Halle (Saale) Hauptbahnhof (train station) opens.
- 1894 – Stadthaus (Halle) (city hall) built.
- 1891 – Electric tram begins operating.
- 1900 – Population: 156,609.

== 20th century ==
- 1905 – Population: 160,031.
- 1918 – Halle State Museum of Prehistory opens.
- 1919 – Population: 182,326.
- 1922 – Burg Giebichenstein University of Art and Design (school) active.
- 1923 – Stadion am Gesundbrunnen (stadium) opens.
- 1940 – Bombing of Halle (Saale) in World War II begins.
- 1944 – Halle concentration camp begins operating.
- 1950 – Turbine Halle (sport club) formed.
- 1966 – Hallescher FC (football club) formed.
- 1967 – City of Halle-Neustadt established near Halle.
- 1990 – Halle-Neustadt becomes part of Halle.
- 1992 – Halle Institute for Economic Research established.
- 2000 – Verein für hallische Stadtgeschichte (history society) founded.

== 21st century ==
- 2006 – Rebuilt Berliner Bridge (Halle) opens.
- 2011 – Erdgas Sportpark opens.
- 2012 – Bernd Wiegand becomes mayor.
- 2015 – Population: 236,991.^{(de)}
- 2019 – Halle synagogue shooting

== See also ==
- Halle history (de)
- List of mayors of Halle (Saale)
- List of heritage sites in Halle (Saale)
- History of Saxony-Anhalt

Other cities in the state of Saxony-Anhalt:^{(de)}

- Timeline of Magdeburg

== Bibliography ==
In English

- "Halle". Chambers's Encyclopaedia. London. 1901. hdl:2027/njp.32101065312900.
- "Halle", Northern Germany (15th ed.), Leipzig: Karl Baedeker, 1910, OCLC 78390379 – via Internet Archive
- "Halle" . Encyclopædia Britannica. Vol. 12 (11th ed.). 1910. pp. 853–854.
- John M. Jeep, ed. (2001). "Halle". Medieval Germany: An Encyclopedia. Garland Publishing. ISBN 0-8240-7644-3.

In German

- Karl von Hegel (1891). "Halle". Städte und Gilden der germanischen Völker im Mittelalter (in German). Vol. 2. Leipzig: Duncker & Humblot. hdl:2027/wu.89094689700 – via HathiTrust.
- "Halle an der Saale". Brockhaus' Konversations-Lexikon (in German) (14th ed.). Leipzig: Brockhaus. 1896. hdl:2027/njp.32101064064585.
- Sachsen-Anhalt II: Regierungsbezirke Dessau und Halle. Handbuch der Deutschen Kunstdenkmäler (in German). Munich. 1999. ISBN 3-422-03065-4.
- Friedhilde Krause; Erhardt Mauersberger; Waltraut Guth, eds. (2000). "Halle (Saale)". Sachsen-Anhalt (in German). Georg Olms Verlag. ISBN 9783487418179.
- "Jahrbuch für hallische Stadtgeschichte", Jahrbuch für Hallische Stadtgeschichte (in German), ISSN 1612-8192 2003–
- Hans-Joachim Kertscher (2012). "Halle an der Saale". In Wolfgang Adam; Siegrid Westphal (eds.). Handbuch kultureller Zentren der Frühen Neuzeit: Städte und Residenzen im alten deutschen Sprachraum [Handbook of cultural centers of the early modern period: cities and capitals in the old German-speaking areas] (in German). De Gruyter. pp. 757–796. ISBN 978-3-11-029555-9.
