= Joséphine-Rosalie de Walckiers =

Joséphine-Rosalie-Pauline de Walckiers (1756–1837) was a composer from the Austrian Netherlands.

== Life ==
Joséphine-Rosalie-Pauline de Walckiers belonged to a rich noble family from Brussels. She was the daughter of vicomte Adrien-Ange de Walckiers de Tronchiennes and Dieudonne de Nettine, and the granddaughter of Barbe de Nettine. Her brother Edouard de Walckiers was a member of the local financial authorities.

== Works ==
Her Quatre romances avec accompt. de forte-piano, premier recueil, were published by Aubert in Paris; a copy is held in the Fürstlich Thurn u. Taxis Hofbibliothek in Regensburg, Germany.

She composed the music for Borée et Flore, a three-act opéra-comique performed at the Théàtre de la Monnaie in Brussels in 1784. She also wrote a divertissement chanté (title unknown) for performance in 1788 at the Théàtre de Schaerbeek in Brussels, and possibly at her salon.

These eight works are listed in Éliane Gubin's Dictionnaire des femmes belges:

1. Quand laissant la cite voisine (1784)
2. Zephire et Flore (1784)
3. Pourquoi sous l'habit de froteur (1788)
4. Pour l' objet qui nous réunit (1788)
5. Dans ces lieux vraiment enchanteurs (1788)
6. Le plus tendre mere (1788)
7. Six romances avec la accompagnement de fortepiano dediées à ma sœur (1789)
8. Six romances avec la accompagnement de fortepiano (1791)
