= Joseph Burroughs =

English Baptist minister

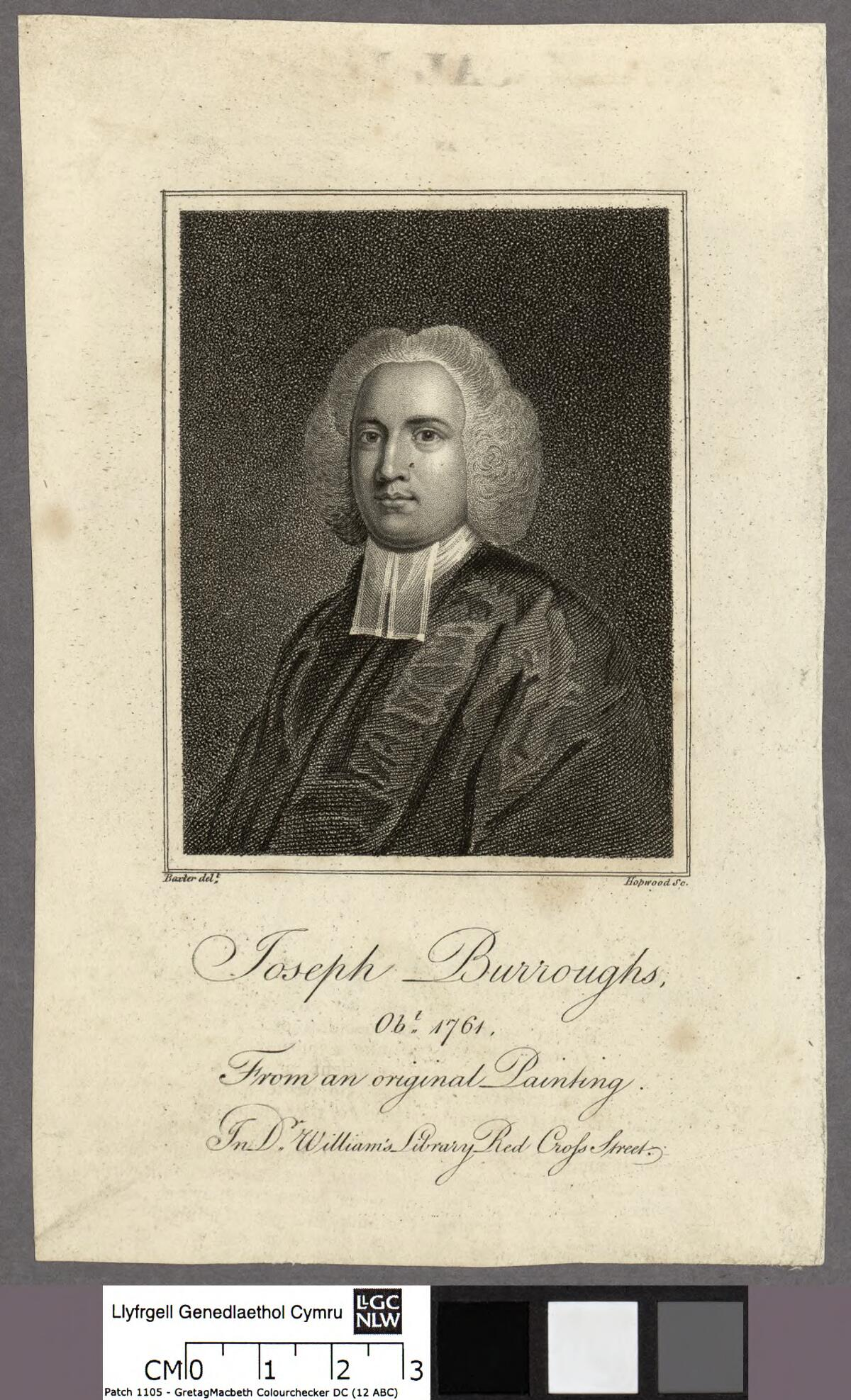

Joseph Burroughs (1 January 1685 – 23 November 1761) was an English Baptist minister.

== Biography ==
He was born in London, on 1 January 1685, of wealthy parents, his father being Humphreys Burroughs. He was educated under Rev. John Kerr, M.D. (a pupil of Thomas Doolittle), at Highgate, where he was class-fellow with John Ward; and at the university of Leyden. In 1714 he received a call to be co-pastor with Richard Allen at the Barbican. He declined the call to the pastorate, but undertook to act as preacher, and on Allen's death he became pastor. He was ordained on 1 May 1717. John Gale, and subsequently the famous James Foster, became his colleagues. His views of believers' baptism were sufficiently strict to place him with the party of close communion; but his general sentiments were not those of a narrow man. He was a non-subscriber at Salters' Hall in 1719. He allowed Emlyn, the unitarian, to occupy his pulpit.

His studies abroad had given him facility in speaking and preaching in French; and in 1734 he preached in Latin to the ministers of the three denominations at their annual meeting in Dr Williams's Library, then at Redcross Street. This discourse is printed in his volume of sermons. He died on 23 November 1761.

== Works ==
His publications were:

- A Sermon occasioned by a total Eclipse of the Sun, 22 April (1715).
- Funeral Sermon for Rev. John Gale (1722).
- Sermon at Ordination of Deacons (1730).
- Sermons preached before the Societies for the Reformation of Manners (1731).
- Sermon on the Popish Doctrine of Auricucular Confession and Plenary Absolution (1735).
- A View of Popery taken from the Creed of Pope Pius IV (1735).
- Sermons (1741).
- Two Discourses relating to Positive Institutions (1742).
- A Defence of the last piece (1743).
- Funeral Sermon for Rev. John Weatherly (1752).
- Funeral Sermon for Rev. Isaac Kimber (1755).

He also edited the posthumous sermons of Joseph Morris, Baptist minister at Glasshouse Yard, prefixing a memoir, in 1753.
