= Giuseppe Matteo Alberti =

Italian Baroque composer and violinist

Giuseppe Matteo Alberti (20 September 1685, in Bologna, Papal States – 18 February 1751, in Bologna, Italy) was an Italian Baroque composer and violinist.

== Life ==
In 1705, he became a member of the Accademia Filarmonica. From 1709, he played the violin in the orchestra of the San Petronio Basilica in Bologna. Later, he was elected a president of the Accademia Filarmonica six times, the first time in 1721. In 1726, he became maestro di capella of San Giovanni in Monte and in 1734 of San Domenico.

== Works ==
His works were influenced by Antonio Vivaldi and they were much played in England. He wrote mostly instrumental works and published 12 symphonies as well as 10 concertos in six parts for violins.

=== List of selected works ===
- 10 Concerti per chiesa e per camera, Op. 1 (Bologna, 1713)
- Oratorio La vergine annunziata (Bologna, 1720)
- Sonate a violino e basso, Op. 2 (Bologna, 1721)
- XII sinfonie a quattro ‘op.2’ (Amsterdam, 1725)
