= Frehat Bat Avraham =

Jewish poet

Freḥa Bat Avraham (Hebrew: פריחא בת רבי אברהם בן אדיבה, born c. 1730s, died 1756), was a Jewish poet.

Bat Avraham was a member of the Moroccan Bar Adiba family, and emigrated from Tunis to Morocco in the 1730s with her father and brother. She was known for her scholarly knowledge, and was described as well-versed in Torah. She composed essays and poetry in Hebrew. As such, she was highly unusual for her sex, time, and place.

Writing under the name of Bat Joseph, Frehat bat Avraham composed biblical commentary and was also known to have owned a large library.

Freha died during the conquest of Tunis by the Algerians. Her father had a synagogue built in her memory, which became a place of pilgrimage for Tunisian Jewish women. She was revered as a holy person, or קְדוֹשָׁה, kedoshah.

== Bibliography ==
- Emily Taitz, Sondra Henry & Cheryl Tallan, The JPS Guide to Jewish Women: 600 B.C.E. to 1900 C.E., 2003
