= Peter Angelis =

Flemish painter

- Pieter Angellis
- Born: 5 November 1685; Dunkirk, France
- Died: 5 November 1734 (aged 48–49); Rennes, France
- Other names: Pieter Anchillus, Pieter van Angellis, Pieter Angelles

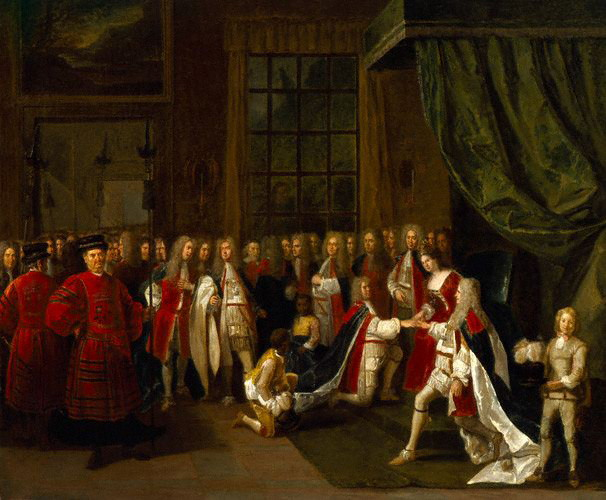
Queen Anne and the Knights of the Garter from about 1720, now in the National Portrait Gallery

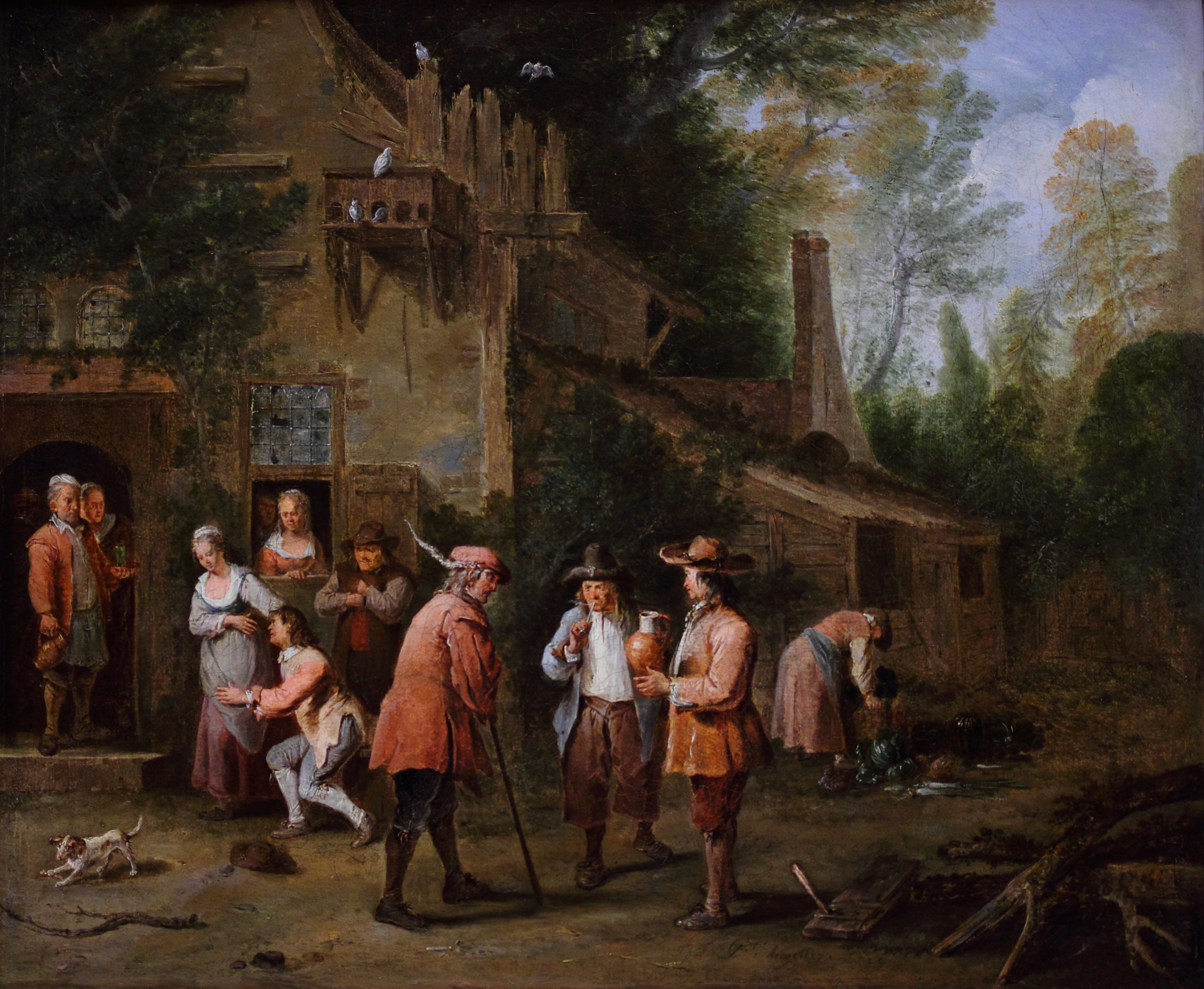
Scene in a court of inn, 1724, now in the Rennes Fine Arts Museum

Peter Angelis (5 November 1685 – 1734), variously recorded as Pieter Angellis, Pieter Anchillus, Pieter van Angellis or Pieter Angelles, was a painter active in Flanders, Germany, Italy, England and France.

== Life ==
Peter Angelis was born at Dunkirk in 1685. After learning the rudiments of art in his native town, he visited Flanders and Germany, and spent some time at Antwerp, where he was made a master of the Guild of St. Luke, in 1715–16; and at Düsseldorf, where he had the opportunity of educating himself by studying the paintings in the Electoral Gallery. He painted conversation-pieces, and landscapes with small figures, into which he often introduced fruit and fish.

In about 1719 he moved to England where he met with great success and stayed for sixteen years. In 1727 he set out for Italy, and spent three years at Rome, where his pictures were admired. But being of a reserved disposition, and without ostentation, he exhibited his works with reluctance, his studious and sober temper inclining him more to the pursuit of his art than to the advancement of his fortune. He intended to return to England, but when he reached Rennes, in Brittany, he found his work in such demand there that he decided to stay. He died in Rennes in 1734.

Horace Walpole wrote of him:

His manner was a mixture of Teniers and Watteau, with more grace than the former, more nature than the latter. His pencil was easy, bright, and flowing, but his colouring too faint and nerveless. He afterwards adopted the habits of Rubens and Vandyck, more picturesque indeed, but not so proper to improve his productions in what their chief beauty consisted, familiar life.

Angelis' Queen Anne and the Knights of the Garter is thought to depict at a ceremony held at Kensington Palace in 1713, several years before his arrival in England. It is now in the collection of the National Portrait Gallery.

== Sources ==
- Walpole, Horace (1798). "Peter Angelis". The Works of Horace Walpole, Earl of Orford, Volume III. London: G.G. and J. Robinson and J. Edwards.

Attribution:
