= Antoinette Larcher =

French engraver

Antoinette Larcher (born 1685, Paris -unknown) was a French engraver.

== Works ==
Larcher was a pupil of Poilly, and based many of her engravings on artists such as Raphael and Il Garofalo.

Larcher signed her works as "Toinette Larcher".

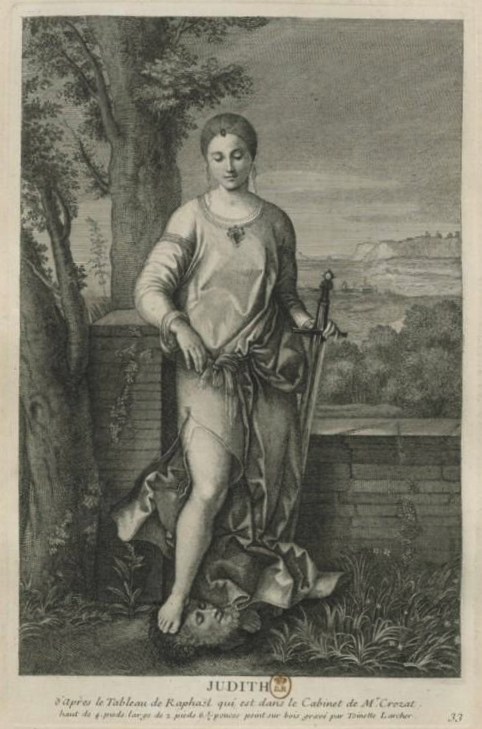
Judith standing with her foot on the head of Holofernes (1729)

Larcher's engraving titled "Judith standing with her foot on the head of Holofernes" was finished about 1729 and is currently housed at the Metropolitan Museum of Art.

She signed works for the "Cabinet Crozat".
