= Barbe de Nettine =

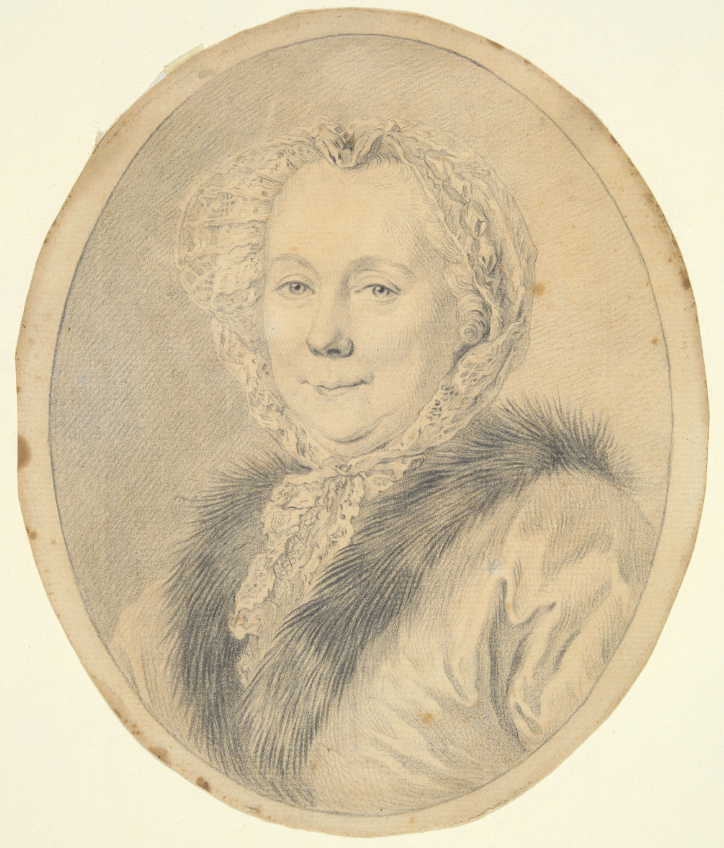
1763 pencil drawing of Barbe de Nettine after a portrait by Jean-Joseph Bernard

Barbe Louise de Nettine, née Stoupy (1706-1775), was a politically influential banker in the Austrian Netherlands.

She married the banker Matthias Nettine, who introduced her in to the business in 1744, and inherited his bank as a widow in 1749. She supplied the government of the Austrian Netherlands with funds and metal for the manufacture of coins and essentially controlled the revenue and expenditure of both the Governor-General and Carl von Cobenzl, who was Ministre plenipotentiaire in 1753-1770. As such, she acquired influence over the financial government policy, and regularly met with Cobenzl who consulted her in all such decisions. During the Seven Years' War, she raised the funds of government loans in the Low countries ti finance the war and laundered money for the empress to avoid the attention of the Low countries Assembly. She successfully prevented the government plans of a national bank in Brussels.

She was ennobled as vicomtesse de Nettine in 1758, and married her daughters into French noble financiers, supported by France who wanted to facilitate French-Austrian financial transactions. She introduced her eldest daughter Dieudonnée Louise Josephine de Nettine (1736-1789) in the business in 1770, and she succeeded her and became court treasurer in 1775. She was the grandmother of the composer Josephine-Rosalie de Walckiers.

== See also ==
- Isabella Simons
