= Bernd Wiegand =

German politician (born 1957)

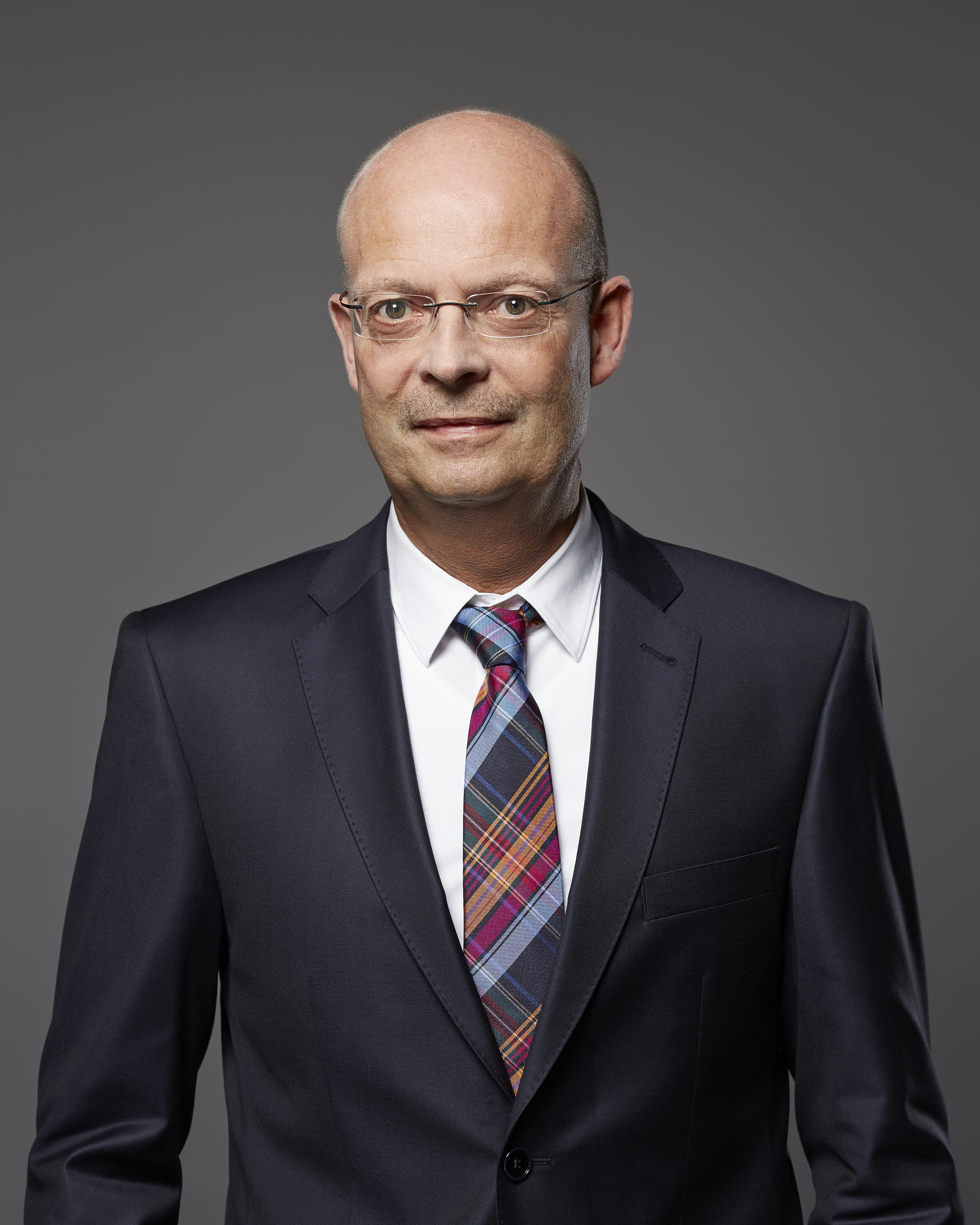

Mayor of Halle (Saale)
- Incumbent
- Assumed office 1 December 2012
- Deputy: Egbert Geier
- Preceded by: Dagmar Szabados

Personal details
- Born: 23 February 1957 (age 69) Braunschweig, West Germany

Bernd Wiegand (born 23 February 1957) is a German independent politician. Until 2011, he was a member of the Social Democratic Party of Germany. He is the mayor of Halle (Saale) since 1 December 2012 after gaining 19.88% of the votes in the first round and 52.92% in the second round. On 27 October 2019, Wiegand was reelected after gaining 61.42% of the votes in the second round.
