= French Colony of Magdeburg =

Historical enclave of Huguenot refugees settled near Magdeburg

The French Colony of Magdeburg (French: la Colonie Française de Magdebourg) was a separate and independent community that existed from 1685 to 1808 in the city of Magdeburg. It co-existed, without any clear boundaries, with the citizens of the city and with the somewhat later colony of German Palatines. Its residents were Huguenot refugees, under the protection of the Elector of Brandenburg-Prussia. The colony had its own church, town hall, mayor, court and even its own home guard, and spoke French every day in all of them and on its streets.

== History ==
In 1661, France was moving away from the previously practiced religious tolerance of the Huguenots living in the country. The Huguenots, the people of the Calvinist and Reformed Churches, were exposed to increasing persecution. On 22 October 1685, the King of France, Louis XIV, issued the Edict of Fontainebleau, proclaiming the Catholic Church as the state religion of France. The practices of other religions were banned and the Reformed churches were destroyed.

=== Edict of Potsdam ===
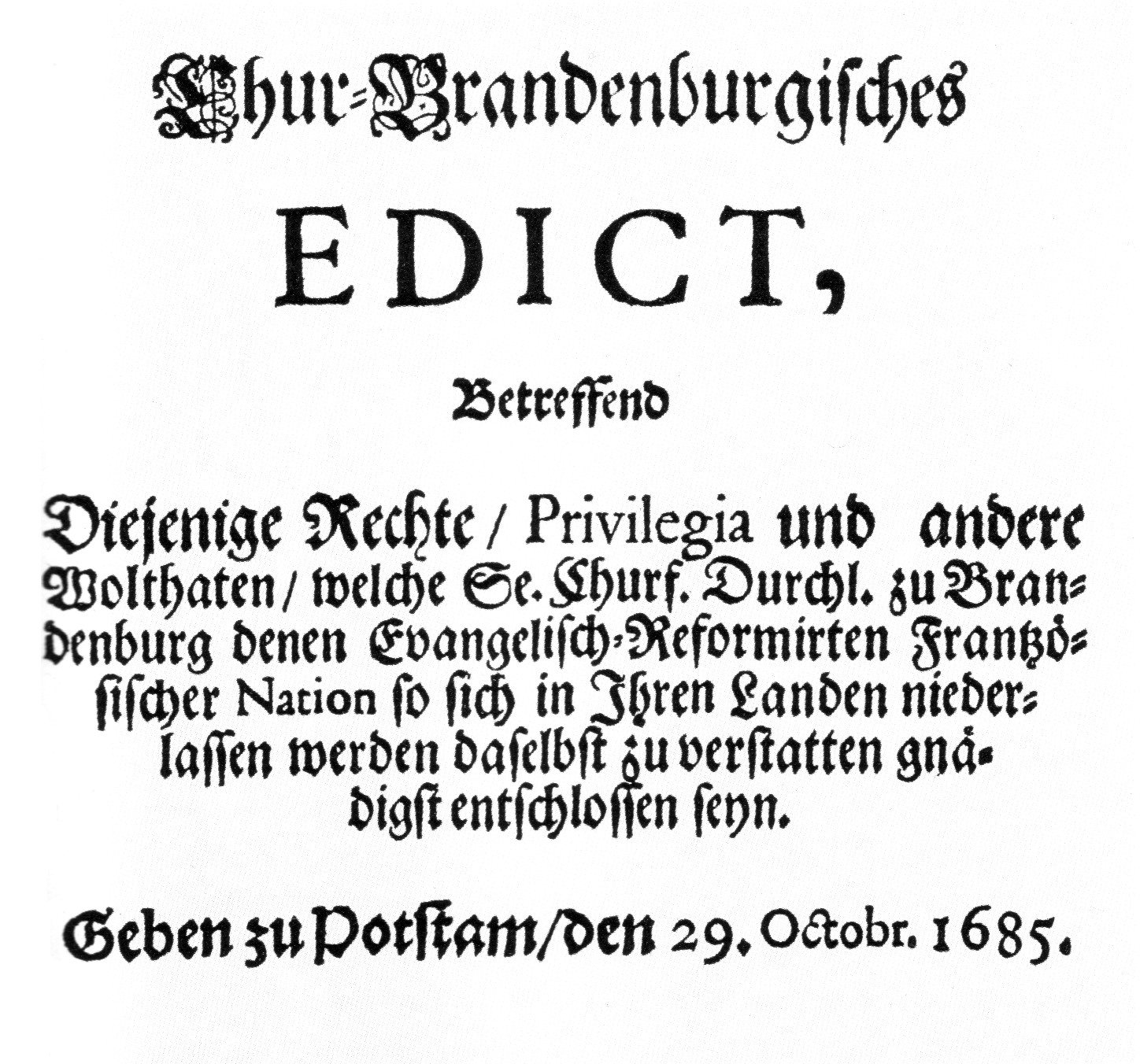
The Edict of Potsdam

On 29 October 1685 (in the Julian Calendar, 8 November 1685 in the Gregorian Calendar), the Elector of Brandenburg-Prussia, Frederick William, issued the Edict of Potsdam, inviting the French religious refugees to come to the lands and cities of his Electorate and settle. The Edict was secretly brought to France and distributed as a leaflet among the Protestants. The aim of the Brandenburg-Prussian government was to establish as many professionals, entrepreneurs and craftsmen as possible to make an immediate impact on the national economy on the local level. The asylum seekers were offered considerable privileges, such as ten-year exemptions from the taxes, exemptions from military service and financial support for homes and workshops. A total of nine cities, including Magdeburg, were recommended as potential residences. At that time, Magdeburg was the capital of the Electorate's newest province, the Duchy of Magdeburg, which had been Brandenburger since 1680. It would develop, with the help of the Huguenot refugees, into the second largest and richest city, behind only Berlin, in the whole Electorate. Already, in the autumn of 1685, a few assorted families of Huguenots were arriving. The date of the founding of the French colony could be set as 1 December 1685, when the City Commander of Magdeburg, Ernst Gottlieb von Borstel ( 1630-1687 ) received the order from Berlin to make it happen as soon as the preacher Banzelin came with the first French families. The first troop of 50 Huguenots then met on 27 December 1685 in Magdeburg.

=== The settlement ===
However, the settlement of the religious refugees in Magdeburg met with considerable resistance from the residents and the local authorities. The city was predominantly Lutheran and the Calvinist newcomers were seen as heretics. The Elector's commands for the facilitation of the settlement, which was to make the houses and abandoned plots available in return for compensation, were ignored. So the Elector’s civil and military authorities of the city had to take over most of the supply functions. Three years later, when the refugees arrived from the Palatinate to establish their own colony in Magdeburg with the same privileges, they were met with a much friendlier reception. But, although they spoke only German, they were still lumped with the French refugees as the "Walloons".

By 1703, the population of French colonists had grown to 1,350 people. However, the economic situation of the French colony turned out to be bad; at least, it was significantly worse than that of the Palatine colony. The proportion of craftsmen to the colonists was relatively low. Because of the circumstances of their flight, the Huguenots had to leave their assets, especially land, behind in France. Many of them were poor. Also, unusual for that time, 34 female heads of households were listed for Magdeburg. They and their families earned their money from sewing with great difficulty, to the annoyance of the long-established craftsmen.

As the Elector had hoped, new workshops and factories also began in Magdeburg. Approximately 200 to 250 refugee families worked there. However, it soon became apparent that the large numbers of the goods produced in Magdeburg at that time could not be absorbed with ease by the numerically and economically weak Brandenburg-Prussia. Even exports to other countries were also difficult to achieve, because these countries could also make the same products. Therefore, there were bankruptcies and business closures, each of which endangered the economic livelihood of the workers.

=== The end ===
On 8 November 1806 the city and fortress of Magdeburg fell to Napoleon and his Grande Armée but they were not welcomed with open arms by the French Colony. Its residents even refused to speak to them, especially after the French soldiers tried to loot the city a few days later, on 11 November. In 1808, the City of Magdeburg abolished all the privileges and rights of the French Colony. So, on 18 November 1808, the Colony was annexed and became, at long last, thoroughly Prussian, especially after the fall of Napoleon and the evacuation of his garrison in the spring of 1814.

== Bibliography ==
- Johannes [Eduard] Fischer, Die Französische Kolonie zu Magdeburg ( Magdeburger Kultur- und Wirtschaftsleben, Band 22[ Magdeburger Cultural and Economical Life, Volume 22 ], Bind 22 ). (Magdeburg: City Council of Magdeburg, 1942)
- Henri [Wilhelm Nathanael] Tollin, Geschichte der französischen Kolonie zu Magdeburg [ History of the French Colony of Magdeburg ], 3 Volumes (Halle an der Saale: Max Niemeyer, 1886–1887; Magdeburg: Faber'schen Buchdruckerei, 1893–1894) Band I 1886, Band 2 1887, Band 3 1894
