= Isabella Simons =

Isabella Simons (Antwerp, 16 November 1694 - 17 January 1756) was a banker in the Austrian Netherlands.

She married Jan Baptist Cogels (1694-1733), son of the founder of the Cogels bank in Antwerp, Jan Baptist Cogels the Elder (1663-1734). After the death of first her spouse and then her father-in-law, she took over the management of the bank in 1734 and never remarried, as she could legally only have managed her own affairs as a widow. During her management, the bank focused on the financing of the national debt in the Austrian Netherlands. Her bank thrived during the War of the Austrian Succession. She had good relations with Empress Maria Theresa and managed to have her spouse ennobled posthumously in 1753. She left the bank to her son, Jan Baptist Cogels III.

== See also ==
- Barbe de Nettine
