= Siamese revolution =

Siamese revolution may refer to:

- Siamese revolution of 1932
- Siamese revolution of 1688
