= France–Thailand relations =

- France: Thailand

Diplomatic mission
- Embassy of France, Bangkok: Embassy of Thailand, Paris

Diplomatic relations with France and Thailand cover a period from the 16th century until modern times. Relations started in earnest during the reign of Louis XIV of France with numerous reciprocal embassies and a major attempt by France to Christianize the Kingdom of Thailand (then known as Siam) and establish a French protectorate, which failed when the country revolted against foreign intrusions in 1688. France would only return more than a century and a half later as a modernised colonial power, engaging in a struggle for territory and influence against Thailand in mainland Southeast Asia that would last until the 20th century. France established a protectorate over the Kingdom of Cambodia in 1863, pressuring Siam to renounce its claims over the region. 30 years later, following the Franco-Siamese crisis and the Paknam naval incident in 1893, Siam was forced to cede all territories east of the Mekong River (which constitutes most of modern Laos) to France under Franco-Siamese Treaty, which then established as the French protectorate as part of Indochina. Following their independence from France in 1953, both Cambodia and Laos fell of the communist takeovers in 1975 such as the Khmer Rouge (Cambodian Reds) in Phnom Penh and Pathet Lao in Vientiane with rise of Marxist–Leninist ideologies, and the aftermaths of their revolutions differed drastically, transforming the geopolitics following the Second Indochina War alongside Vietnam after the Fall of Saigon to the Viet Cong at the end of the Vietnam War in April 1975 and the Vietnamese unification in July 1976, with Saigon renamed "Ho Chi Minh City" in honor of the late revolutionary leader who defeated both French colonialism and the American imperialism like other communist leaders such as Saloth Sâr ("Pol Pot", a French phrase for Politique Potentielle) and Souphanouvong fought to establish a new systems in Indochina by their visions of a socialist paradise.

== 16th–17th century relations ==
=== First French Catholic missions ===
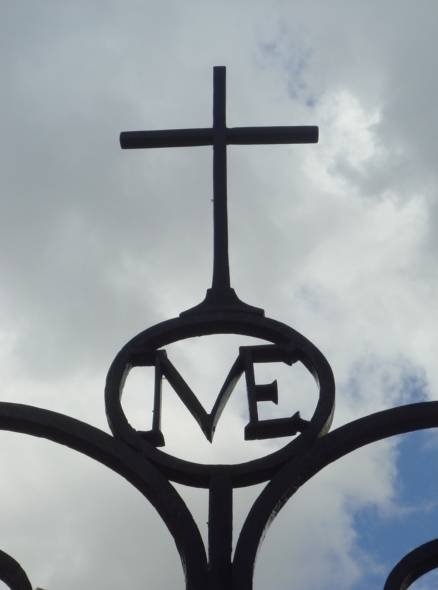
A newly formed missionary order, the Paris Foreign Missions Society, initiated contacts between France and Thailand.

The first instance of France-Thailand contacts is also the first historical record of an attempt to introduce Christianity to Siam: according to Giovanni Pietro Maffei, about 1550 a French Franciscan, Bonferre, hearing of the great kingdom of the Bagoans and the Thai in the east, went on a Portuguese ship from Goa to Cosme (Bago), where for three years he preached the gospel without any result.

The first major contacts between the two countries occurred after Thailand was made an apostolic vicariate by Pope Alexander VII on 22 August 1662. The mission was assigned to the newly formed Paris Foreign Missions Society to evangelize Asia, and Siam became the first country to receive these efforts, to be followed by new missions 40 years later in Cochinchina, Tonkin and parts of China, because Siam was highly tolerant of other religions and was indeed the only country in Southeast Asia where the Catholic Fathers could establish themselves safely.

Monseigneur Pierre Lambert de la Motte, Bishop of Beirut, Vicar-Apostolic of Cochinchina, and member of the Missions Etrangères de Paris, accompanied by Fathers De Bourges and Deydier, left Marseille on 26 November 1660, and reached Mergui 18 months later. He arrived in the Ayutthaya Kingdom in 1662.

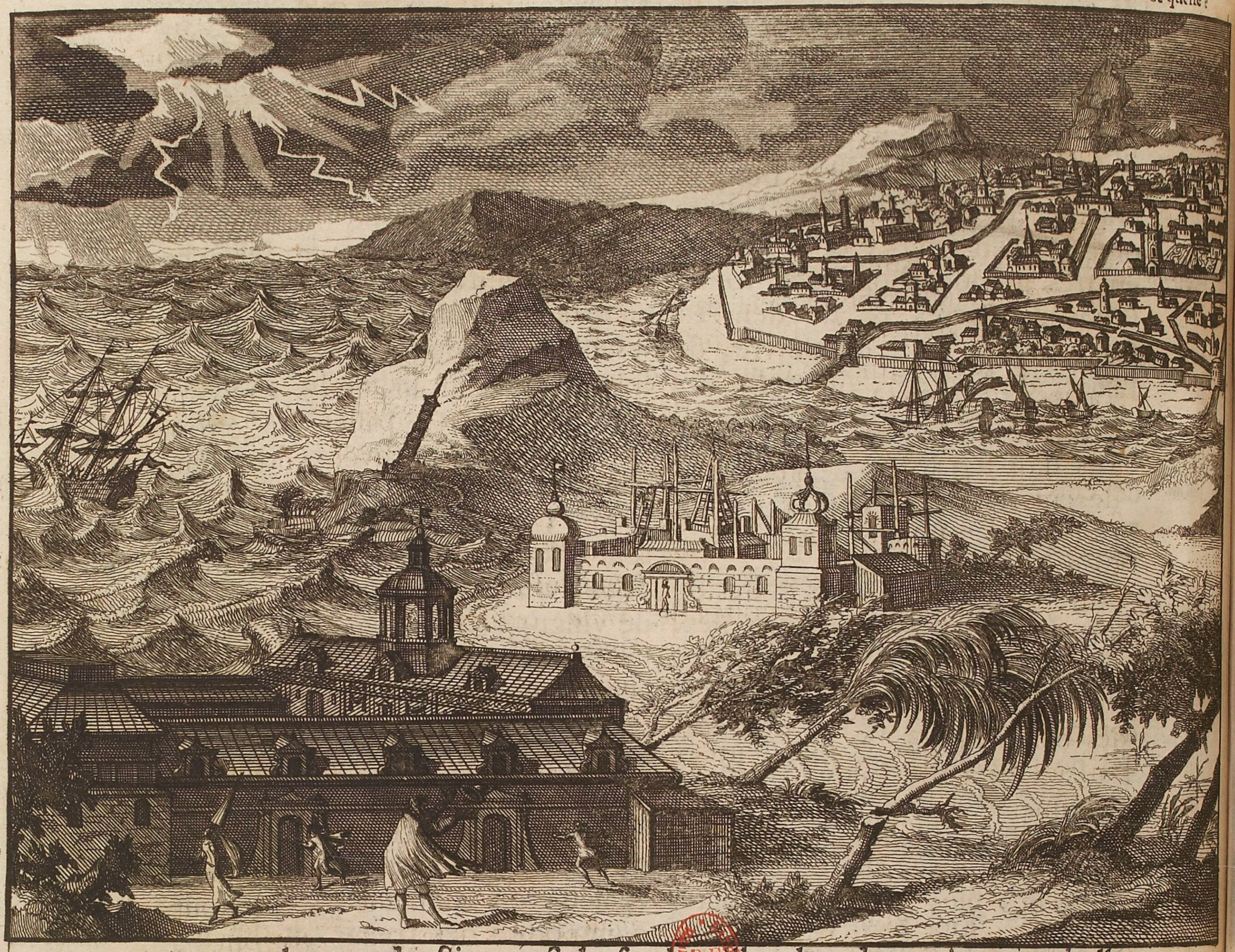
Foundation of the Seminary of Saint Joseph (now College General) in the Ayutthaya Kingdom (17th century print)

In 1664, a group of missionaries led by François Pallu, Bishop of Heliopolis, also of the Paris Foreign Missions Society, joined Lambert in the capital city of Ayutthaya after 24 months overland travel and started missionary work. In 1665–66 they built a seminary in Ayutthaya with the approval of King Narai, the Seminary of Saint Joseph (later Seminary of the Holy Angels, at the origin of the College General, now in Penang, Malaysia).

In 1669, Louis Laneau, Bishop of Motella, also a member of the Paris Foreign Missions Society, was named head of a Roman Catholic mission in mainland Southeast Asia, with his headquarters at Ayutthaya. They propagated the Christian faith and also took care of Annamite Christians and Japanese Christian communities in Thailand. Narai welcomed these missionaries, providing them with land for a church, a mission-house and a seminary (St. Joseph's colony). Bishops Lambert and Ballue established a Western hospital in Thailand in 1669 at Ayutthaya, with Father Laneau as the head doctor. The hospital provided medical care to about 200–300 people daily.

During a 1670 trip to France, Pallu obtained from Louis XIV a letter to King Narai, which, together with a letter from the Pope, he remitted in Ayutthaya in October 1673 and which was received with great reverence.

These contacts were closely associated with the development of French influence in South Asia, and especially with the establishment of the French East India Company in 1664, and the development of colonial French India.

=== First trade contacts (1680) ===
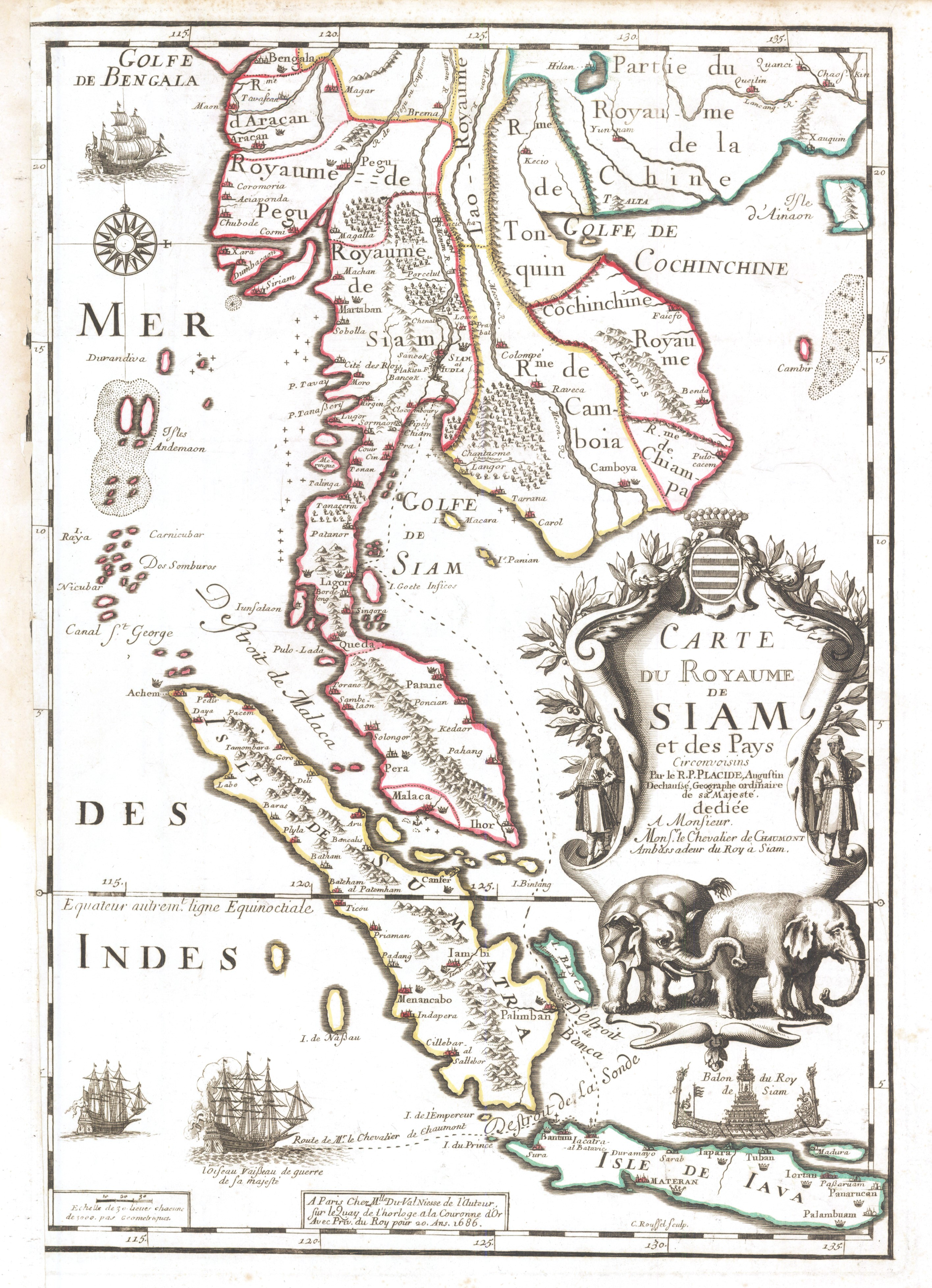
1686 French map of Siam, showing the route of Chevalier de Chaumont

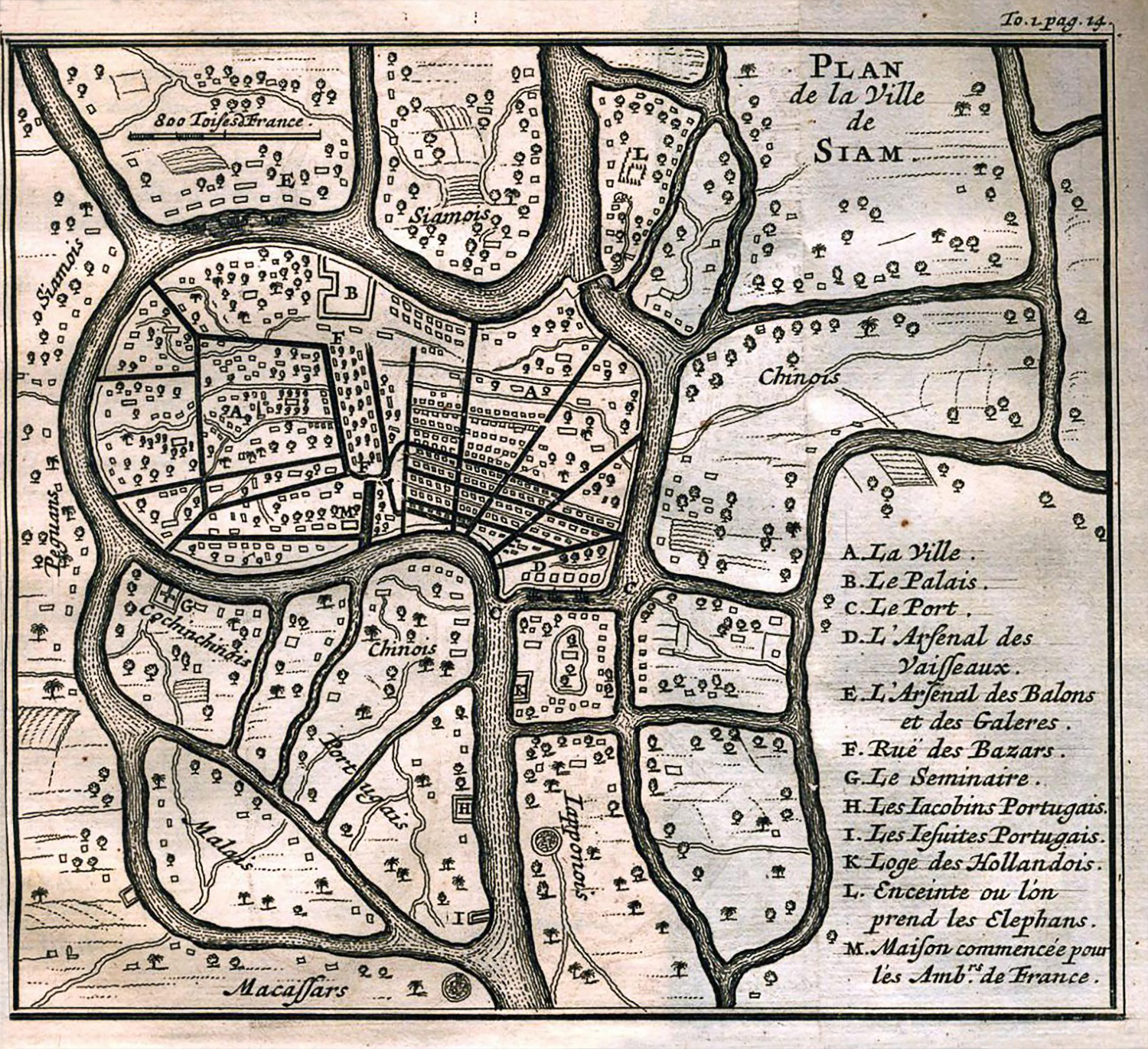
The French quarter in Ayutthaya is at the top left ("France") of the map, 1691

In 1680, the newly formed French East India Company sent a ship to Thailand, bearing a trading mission led by André Deslandes-Boureau, son-in-law of the Governor General of the French settlement in Pondicherry François Martin, which was well received by the Thais.

In September 1680, a ship from the French East India Company visited Phuket and left with a full cargo of tin. The Dutch, the English, and from the 1680s the French, competed with each other for trade with the island of Phuket (the island was named Junk Ceylon at that time), which was valued as a rich source of tin. In 1681 or 1682, Siamese King Narai, who was seeking to reduce Dutch and English influence, named Governor of Phuket the French medical missionary Brother René Charbonneau, a member of the Siam mission of the Société des Missions Etrangères. Charbonneau held the position of Governor until 1685.

In a series of missions back and forth each side honoured its kings and celebrated its artistic achievements, and learned to appreciate the other's. The delegations sought to foster more commerce and elevate their prestige and on the global stage. Artists in Paris produced scores of prints depicting the Siamese diplomats and the lavish receptions at Versailles and Ayutthaya. Thousands of art objects – especially mirrors, porcelain, textiles, and metalwork – were exchanged.

=== First Thai embassies to France (1680 and 1684) ===
King Narai further sought to expand relations with the French, to counter Portuguese and Dutch influence in his kingdom, and at the suggestion of his Greek counselor Constantine Phaulkon. In 1664, the Dutch had used force to exact a treaty granting them extraterritorial rights as well as freer access to trade. In 1680, a first Siamese ambassador to France was sent in the person of Phya Pipatkosa on board the Soleil d'Orient, but the ship was wrecked off the coast of Africa after leaving Mauritius and he disappeared.

A second embassy was sent to France in 1684 (passing through England), led by Khun Pijaiwanit and Khun Pijitmaitri, requesting the dispatch of a French embassy to Thailand. They met with Louis XIV in Versailles. In response, Louis XIV sent an embassy led by the Chevalier de Chaumont.

=== Embassy of Chevalier de Chaumont (1685) ===
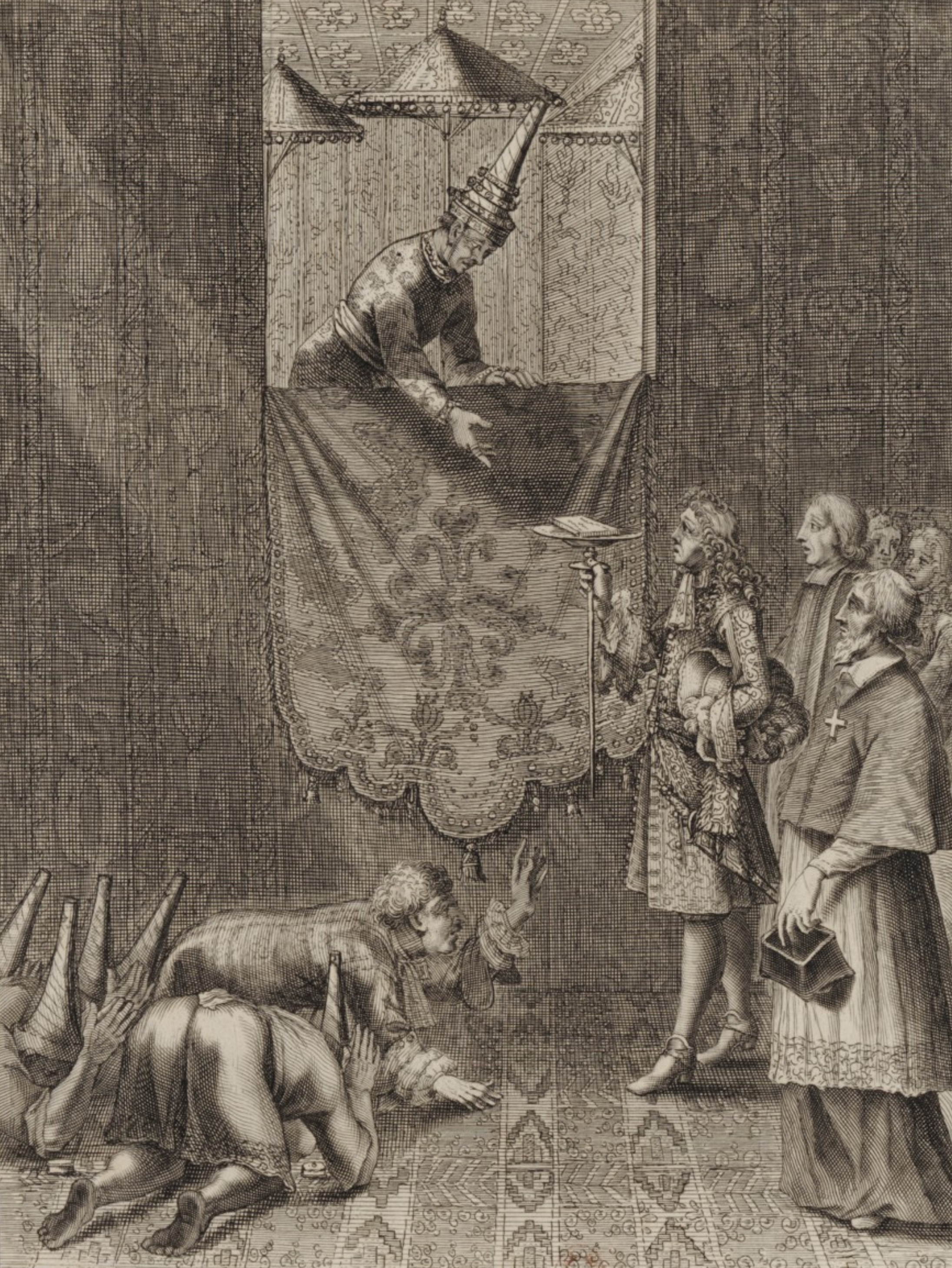
Chevalier de Chaumont presents a letter from Louis XIV to King Narai.

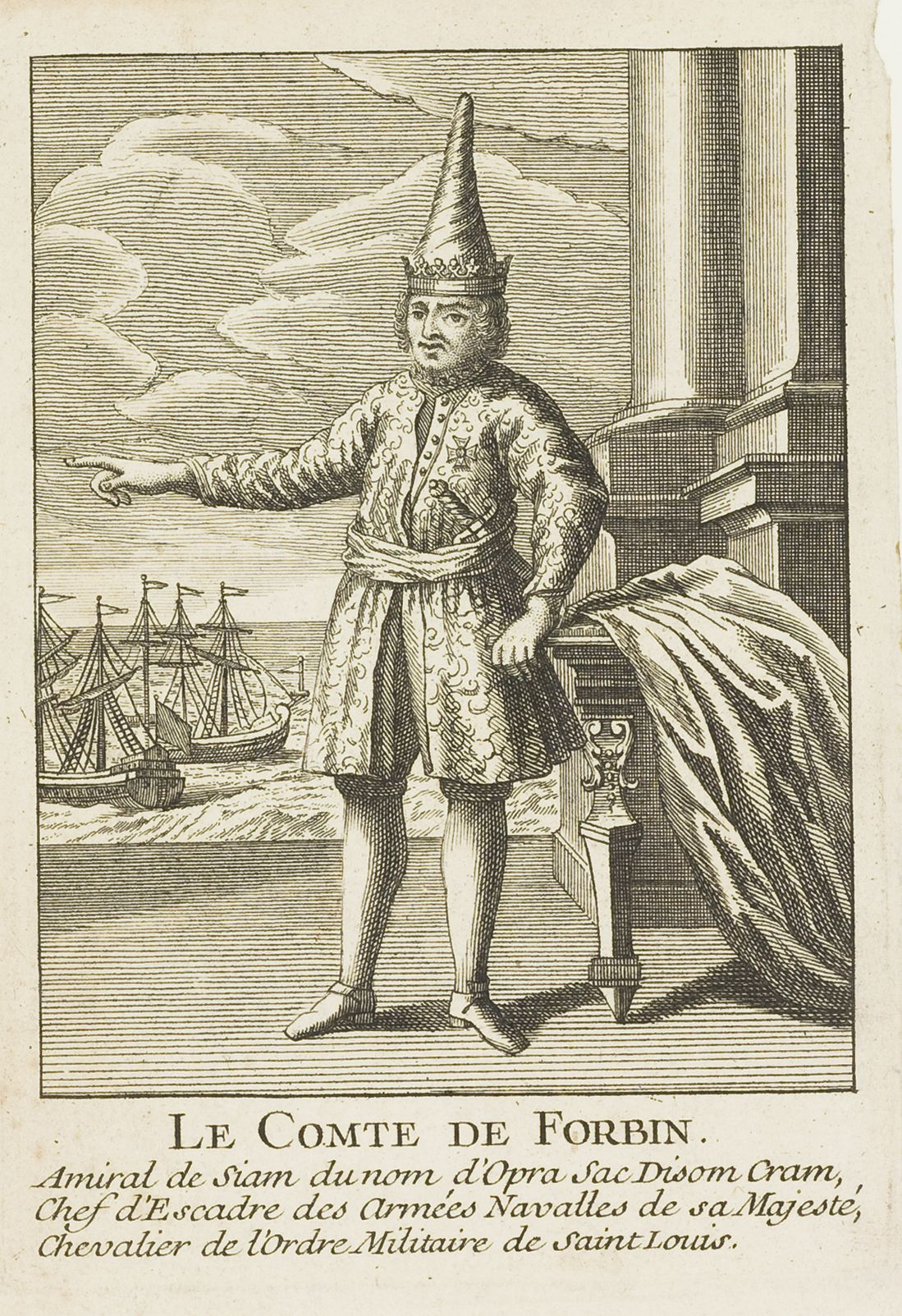
Chevalier Claude de Forbin clad as Siamese grand admiral

The Chevalier de Chaumont was the first French ambassador for King Louis XIV in Siam. He was accompanied on his mission by Abbé de Choisy, the Jesuit Guy Tachard, and Father Bénigne Vachet of the Société des Missions Étrangères de Paris. At the same time, he returned to Siam the two ambassadors of the 1684 First Siamese Embassy to France.

Chevalier de Chaumont also brought a group of Jesuit mathematicians (Jean de Fontaney (1643–1710), Joachim Bouvet (1656–1730), Jean-François Gerbillon (1654–1707), Louis Le Comte (1655–1728) and Claude de Visdelou (1656–1737)) whose mission was to continue to China to reach the Jesuit China missions. Le Comte remain in Siam with King Narai, but the others reached China in 1687.

Chevalier de Chaumont tried without success to convert Narai to Catholicism and to conclude significant commercial treaties. A provisional agreement was signed to facilitate trade between France and the Royal Warehouse Department. France also received a tin monopoly in Phuket, with Chaumont's former maître d'hôtel Sieur de Billy named governor of the island, and received the territory of Songkla in the south.

When Chaumont returned to France, Count Claude de Forbin, who had accompanied Chaumont with the rank of major aboard the Oiseau, was induced to remain in the service of the Siamese king, and accepted, though with much reluctance, the posts of grand admiral, general of all the king's armies and governor of Bangkok. His position, however, was soon made untenable by the jealousy and intrigues of the minister Constantine Phaulkon, and after two years he left Siam, reaching France in 1688. He was replaced as Governor of Bangkok by the Chevalier de Beauregard.

The French engineer Lamarre also remained in Siam at the king's request in order to build fortifications. He began by building a fortress in Bangkok, and designed fortifications for Ligor (Nakhon Sithammarat), Singor (Songkhla), Phatthalung, Ayutthaya, Louvo (Lopburi), Mergui, Inburi and Thale Chupson.

=== Second Thai embassy to France (1686) ===
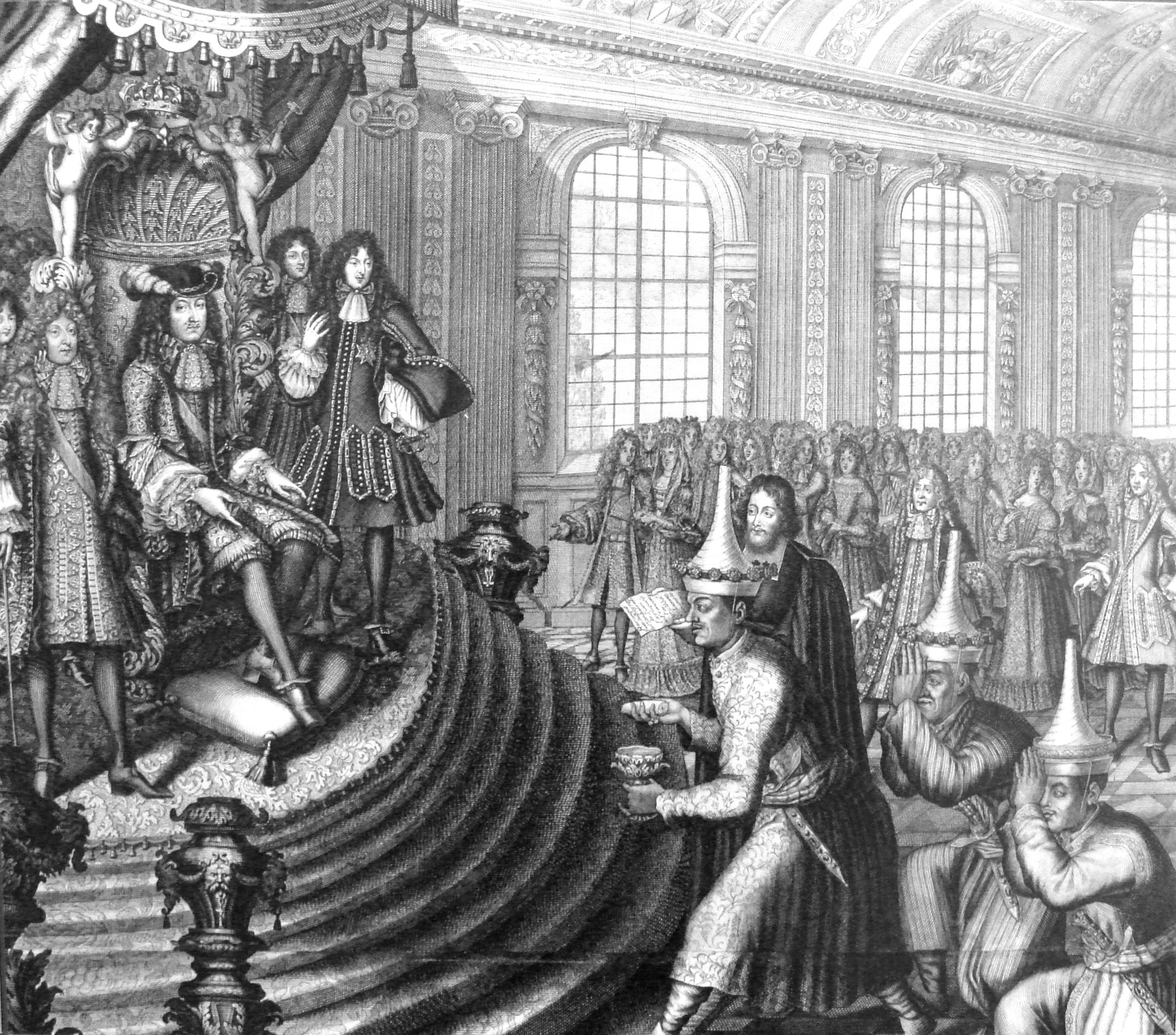
1686 Siamese embassy to Louis XIV led by Kosa Pan (by Nicolas Larmessin)

A second Thai embassy, led by Kosa Pan, was sent to France to ratify the treaties. The embassy accompanied the returning embassy of Chevalier de Chaumont and traveled on the boats l'Oiseau and la Maligne. It brought a proposal for an eternal alliance between France and Siam and stayed in France from June 1686 to March 1687. Kosa Pan was accompanied by two other Siamese ambassadors, Ok-luang Kanlaya Ratchamaitri and Ok-khun Si Wisan Wacha, and by the Jesuit Father Guy Tachard.

Kosa Pan's embassy was met with a fair reception and caused a sensation in the courts and society of Europe. The mission landed at Brest, France and traveled overland to Versailles, constantly surrounded by crowds of onlookers.

The "exotic" clothes as well as manners of the envoys (including their kowtowing to Louis XIV during their visit to him on 1 September), together with a special "machine" that was used to carry King Narai's missive to the French monarch caused much comment in French high society. Kosa Pan's great interest in French maps and images was commented upon in a contemporary issue of the Mercure Galant.

The main street of Brest was named Rue de Siam in honour of the embassy.

=== Siam–England war (1687) ===
Meanwhile, the Ayutthaya Kingdom entered into conflict with the East India Company, officially declaring war in August 1687. The reason was that the Englishman Samuel White had risen to prominence to become governor of Mergui in 1684, replacing his compatriot Barnaby. From there he traded under the flag of the Ayutthaya Kingdom and engaged in piracy, sometimes attacking ships under English jurisdiction. The English responded by dispatching warships to the harbour of Mergui, and the Siamese forces massacred most of the English residents there. In place of Samuel White, the French Chevalier de Beauregard was nominated Governor of Mergui by the king of Ayutthaya in 1687.

=== Embassy of Loubère-Céberet (1687) ===
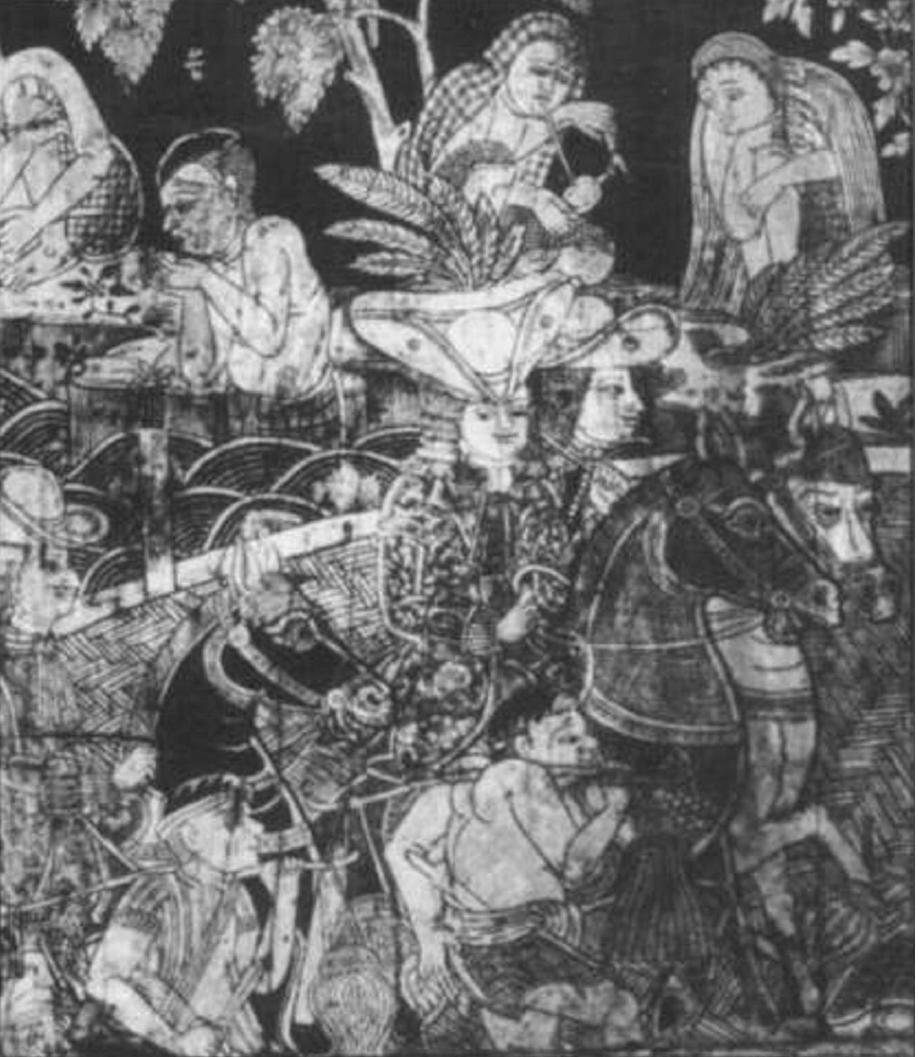
French soldiers in Siam (17th century Siamese painting)

A second French embassy was sent to Siam in March 1687, organized by Colbert, with Guy Tachard again included. The embassy consisted of a French expeditionary force of 1,361 soldiers, missionaries, envoys and crews aboard five warships, and had the additional duty of returning the embassy of Kosa Pan to Siam. The military wing was led by General Desfarges, and the diplomatic mission by Simon de la Loubère and Claude Céberet du Boullay, a director of the French East India Company. The embassy arrived in Bangkok in October 1687, on the warships Le Gaillard (52 guns), L'oiseau (46 guns), La Loire (24 guns), La Normande and Le Dromadaire.

The mission included 14 Jesuit scientists sent to Siam by Louis XIV, under the guidance of Father Tachard. The Jesuits (including Pierre d'Espagnac) were given the title of "Royal Mathematicians" and were sponsored by the Academy.

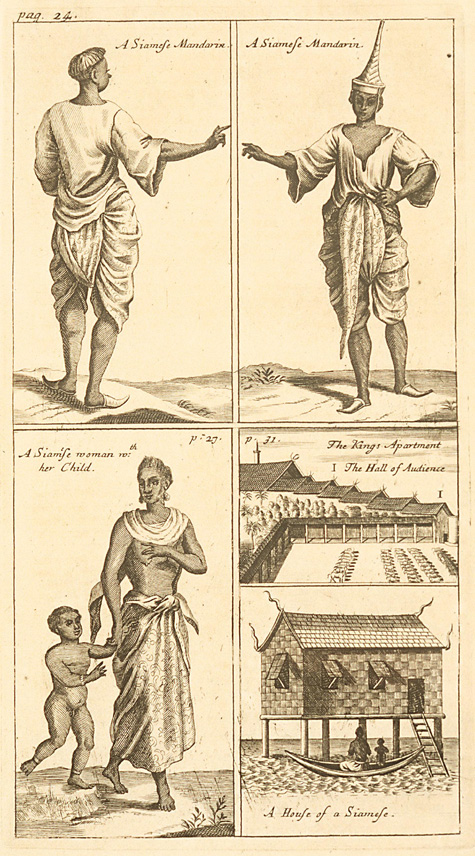
A page from Simon de la Loubère: Du Royaume de Siam

Desfarges had instructions to negotiate the establishment of troops in Mergui and Bangkok rather than the southern Songkla, and to take these locations if necessary by force. King Narai agreed to the proposal, and fortresses were established in the two cities, commanded by French governors. Desfarges commanded the fortress at Bangkok, with 200 French officers and men, and a Siamese contingent provided by King Narai. du Bruant was in command of Mergui with 90 French soldiers. In 1688, Jean Rival was named governor of Bangkhli (modern Phang Nga). Another 35 soldiers with 3 or 4 French officers were assigned to ships of the King of Siam, with the mission of fighting piracy.

The diplomatic mission achieved little apart from the reaffirmation of the 1685 commercial treaty. The Jesuit Father Tachard had obtained secret instructions from Seignelay, which allowed him to deal directly with Phaulkon. Hopes for the conversion of King Narai to Catholicism, which had largely motivated the embassy sent by Louis XIV, did not materialize.

As a side-note to the history of mathematics, Simon de la Loubère also brought from his travels to Siam a simple method for creating n-odd magic squares, known as the "Siamese method" or the "de la Loubère method", which apparently was initially discovered in Surat, India by another Frenchman, M. Vincent, who was sailing on the return ship with de la Loubère.

=== Third Thai embassy to France (1688) ===
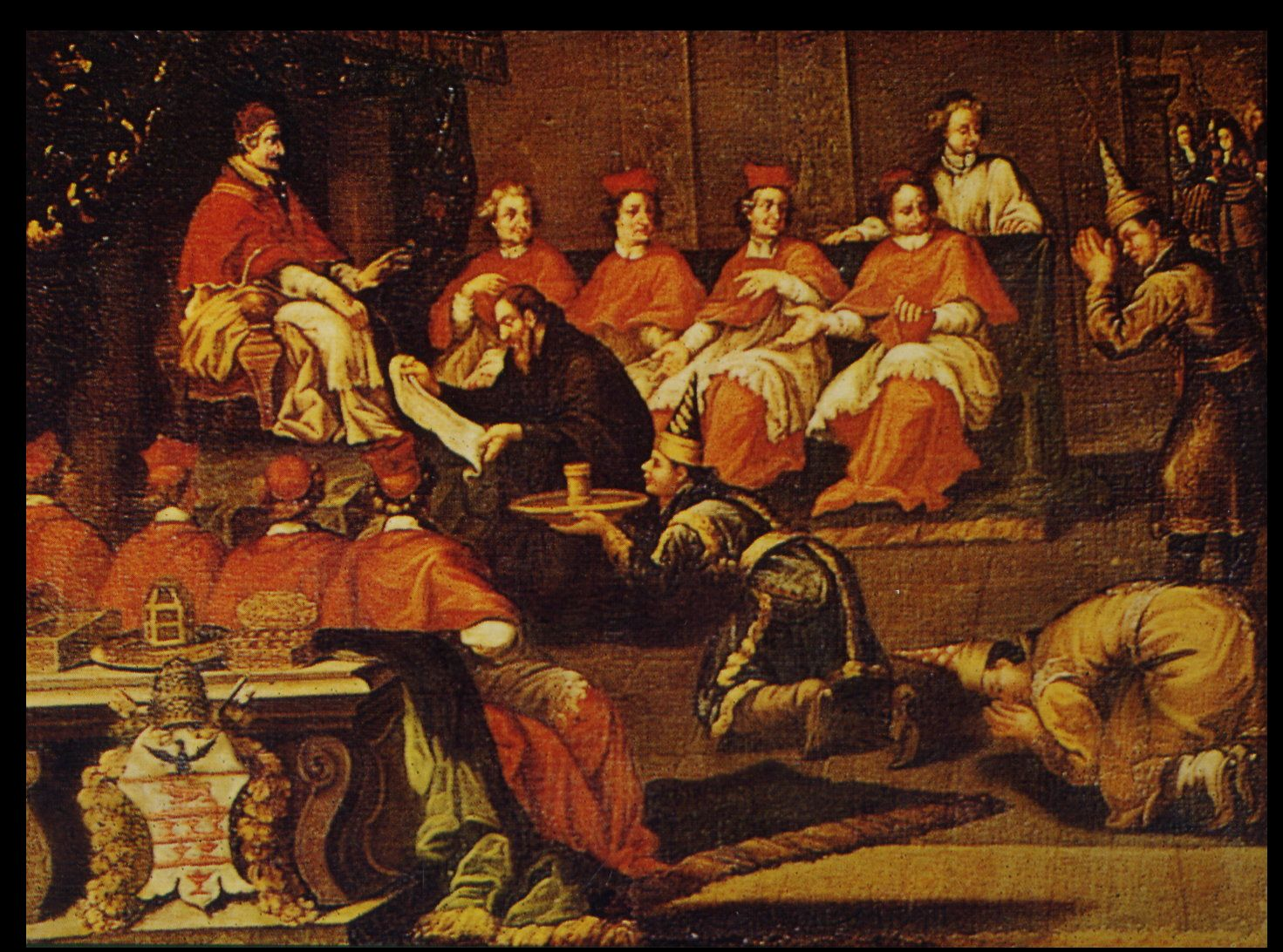
Tachard, with Siamese envoys, translating the letter of King Narai to Pope Innocent XI (December 1688)

Meanwhile, the Jesuit Guy Tachard returned to France with the title of "Ambassador Extraordinary for the King of Siam", accompanied by Ok-khun Chamnan, and visited the Vatican in January 1688. He and his Siamese embassy met with Pope Innocent XI and translated Narai's letter to him. In February 1689, the embassy was granted an audience with Louis XIV, and the treaty of commerce which Céberet had obtained in 1687 was ratified. Two weeks later a military treaty was signed, designating François d'Alesso, Marquis d'Eragny, as captain of the palace guard in Ayutthaya and inspector of the French troops in Siam.

=== 1688 revolution ===
The landing of French troops in Bangkok and Mergui led to strong nationalistic movements in Siam directed by the Mandarin and Commander of the Elephant Corps, Phra Petratcha. In April 1688, Phaulkon requested military help from the French in order to neutralize the plot. Desfarges responded by leading 80 troops and 10 officers out of Bangkok to the Palace in Lopburi, but he stopped on the way in Ayutthaya and finally abandoned his plan and retreated to Bangkok for fear of being attacked by Siamese rebels and deterred by false rumors that the king had already died.

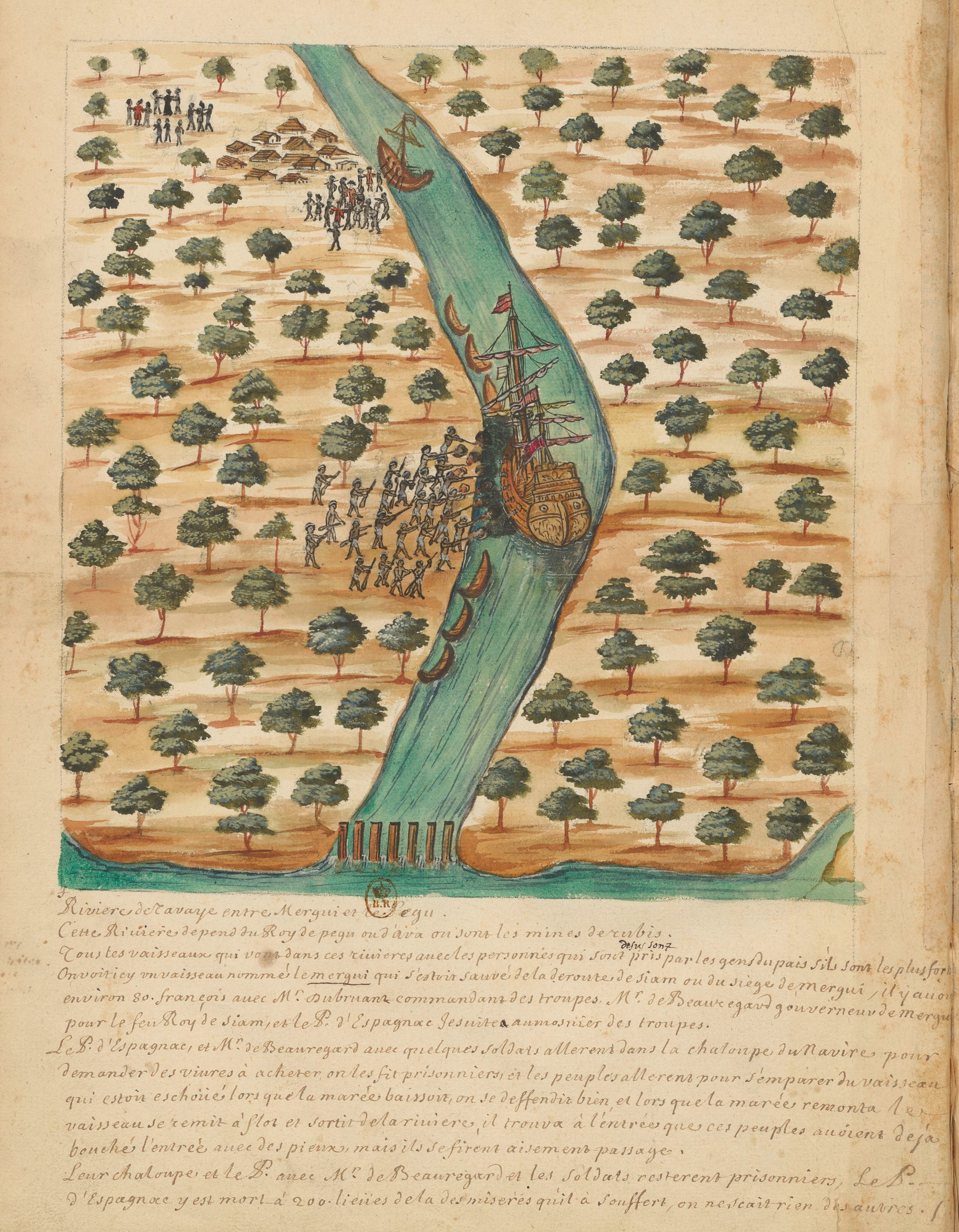
Siamese attack on du Bruant in Tavoy.

On 10 May the dying King Narai named his daughter Yothathep as regent. He then learnt that Phetracha was preparing a coup d'état against him. This spurred Phetracha to execute the long-planned coup immediately, initiating the 1688 Siamese revolution. On 17–18 May 1688, King Narai was arrested, and on 5 June Phaulkon was executed. Six French officers were captured in Lopburi and mobbed, one of them dying as a result. Many members of Narai's family were assassinated (the king's brothers, his successors by right, were killed on 9 July), and King Narai died in detention on 10 July. Phra Phetracha was crowned king on 1 August. Kosa Pan, the 1686 ambassador to France, became the Minister of Foreign Affairs and Trade.

Large-scale attacks were launched on the two French fortresses in Siam, and on 24 June, the French under du Bruant had to abandon their garrison at Mergui. du Bruant and the Chevalier de Beauregard escaped under fire by seizing a Siamese warship, the Mergui. du Bruant and his troops were stranded on a deserted island for four months before being captured by a British warship. They ultimately returned to Pondicherry by way of Madras.

==== Siege of Bangkok ====
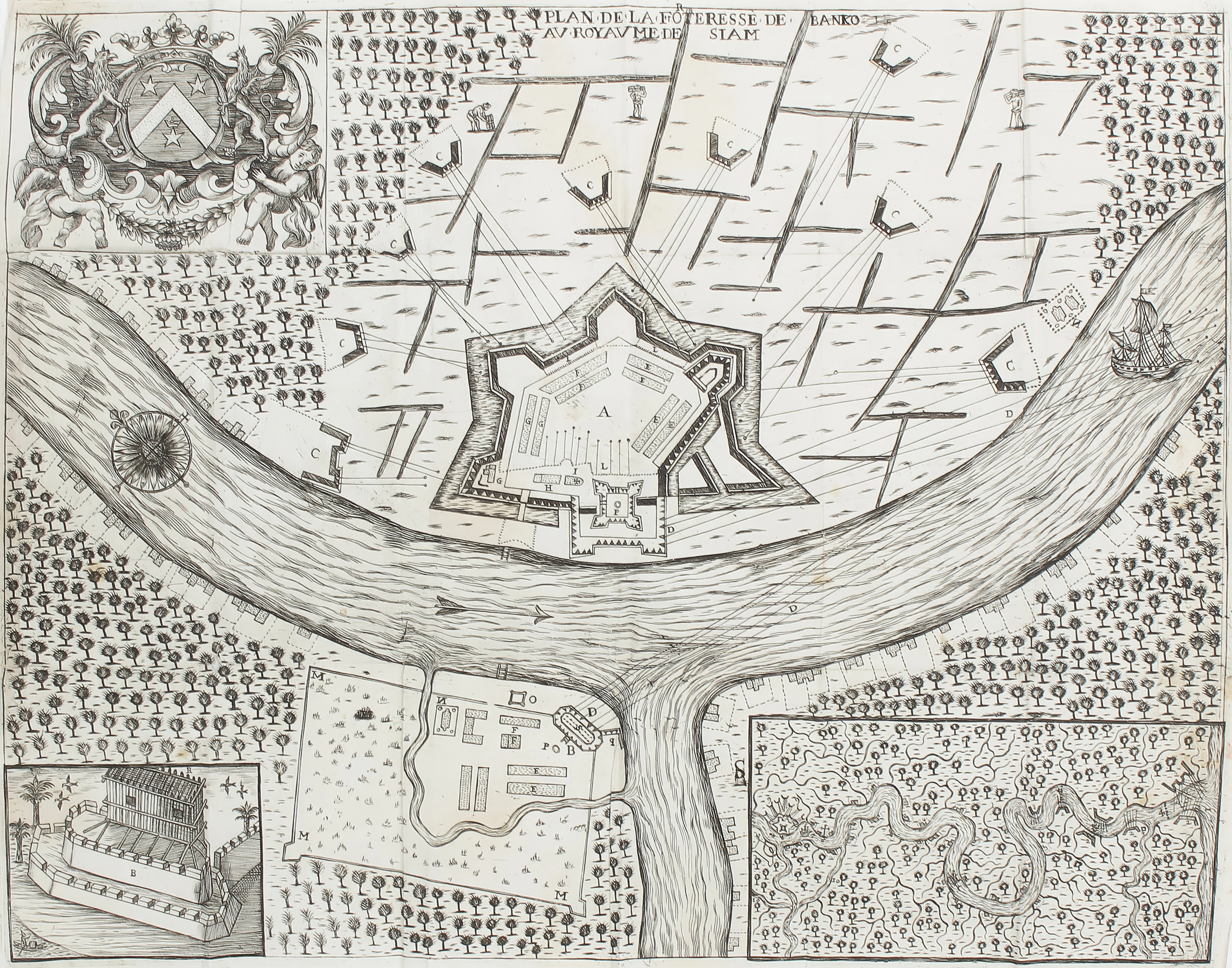
Siege of Bangkok. The French fortress (A) besieged by Siamese troops and batteries (C), in Bangkok, 1688. The village of Bangkok (lower left corner, M) is today's Thonburi.

Phetracha besieged the French fortress in Bangkok with 40,000 men, and over a hundred cannon, for four months. The Siamese troops apparently received Dutch support in their fight against the French. On 9 September the French warship Oriflamme, carrying 200 troops and commanded by de l'Estrilles, arrived at the mouth of the Chao Phraya River, but was unable to dock at the Bangkok fortress as the Siamese had blocked entrance to the river.

Phaulkon's Catholic Japanese-Portuguese wife Maria Guyomar de Pinha, who had been promised protection by being ennobled a countess of France, took refuge with the French troops in Bangkok, but Desfarges returned her to the Siamese under pressure from Phetracha on 18 October; she was condemned to perpetual slavery in the kitchens of Phetracha. Desfarges finally negotiated to return with his men to Pondicherry on 13 November, on board the Oriflamme and two Siamese ships, the Siam and the Louvo, provided by Phetracha.

Some of the French troops remained in Pondicherry to bolster the French presence there, but most left for France on 16 February 1689, on board the French Navy Normande and the French Company Coche, with the engineer Vollant des Verquains and the Jesuit Le Blanc on board. The two ships were captured by the Dutch at Cape of Good Hope, however, because the War of the Augsburg League had started. After a month in the Cape, the prisoners were sent to Zeeland where they were kept at the prison of Middelburg. They were able to return to France through a general exchange of prisoners.

On 10 April 1689, Desfarges, who had remained in Pondicherry, led an expedition to capture the island of Phuket in an attempt to restore some sort of French control in Siam. The occupation of the island led nowhere, and Desfarges returned to Pondicherry in January 1690. Recalled to France, he left 108 troops in Pondicherry to bolster defenses, and left with his remaining troops on the Oriflamme and the Company ships Lonré and Saint-Nicholas on 21 February 1690. Desfarges died on board near Martinique, and the Oriflamme sank on 27 February 1691, with most of the remaining French troops, off the coast of Brittany.

=== Duquesne-Guiton mission (1690) ===
The 1688 Siamese embassy was returned to Siam by the six-warship fleet of Abraham Duquesne-Guiton (nephew of Abraham Duquesne) in 1690, but because of unfavourable winds the fleet halted at Balassor, at the mouth of the Ganges, where they dropped the embassy. The embassy finally returned to Ayutthaya overland.

=== Father Tachard (1699) ===
In 1699, Father Guy Tachard again went to Siam, and managed to enter the country. He met with Kosa Pan, now Minister of Foreign Affairs and Trade, and the new King Phetracha, but the meeting remained purely formal and led to nothing. He apparently kept insisting on the establishment of a French fort in Tenasserim, with the effect that negotiations were broken off without any result.

== 18th century relations ==
The revolution in Thailand interrupted relations between France and Thailand until the 19th century, although French Jesuits were allowed to continue preaching in Thailand.

After peace was achieved in 1690, Bishop Laneau was able to resume his missionary work, which he continued until his death in 1696. He was succeeded by Bishop Louis of Cice (1700–27). The rest of the century consisted in persecutions by the Siamese or by the Burmese invaders. The king kept his favour for Bishops Texier de Kerlay and de Lolière-Puycontat (1755).

Between 1760 and 1765, a French group of gunners led by Chevalier Milard participated in the Burmese invasions of Siam, as an elite corps of the Burmese army.

After the Burmese invasions, in 1769 Father Corre resumed missionary work in Siam, followed by Mgr Lebon (1772–80). Lebon had to leave in 1775 after persecutions, but his successors Bishops Condé and Garnault returned to Siam.

== 19th century relations ==
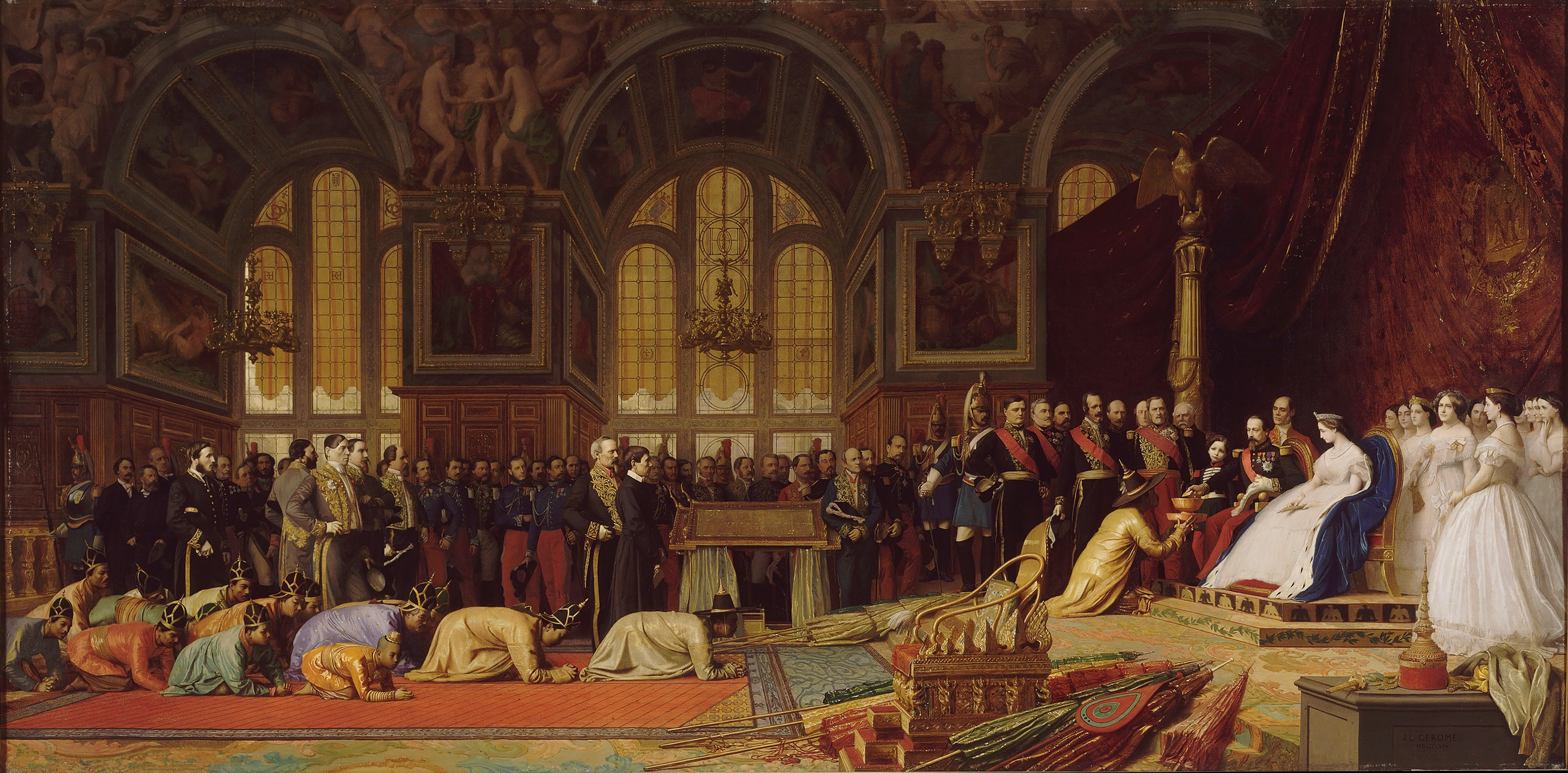
Siamese embassy to Napoleon III (27 June 1861)

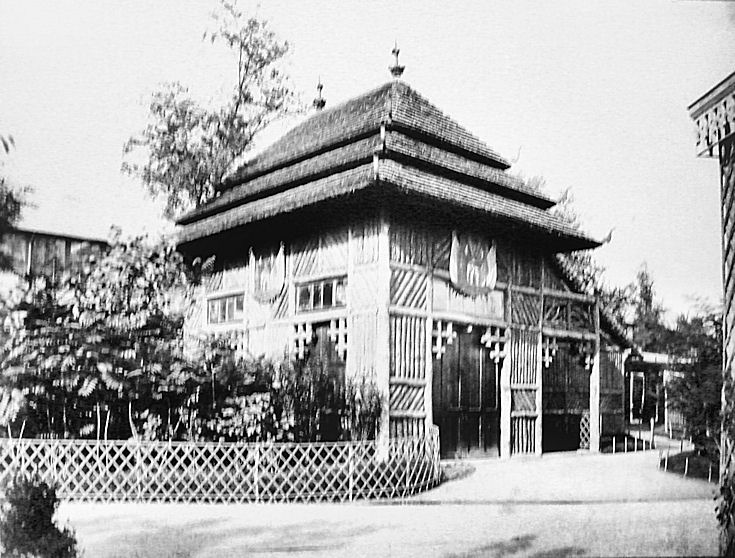
Siamese elephant pavillon at the Exposition Universelle in Paris (1867)

New missionaries arrived to Siam in 1826 and 1830 (among them Fathers Bouchot, Barbe, Bruguière, Vachal, Grandjean, Pallegoix and Courvezy). In 1834, Mgr Courzevy became Vicar Apostolic of Siam, heralding a new beginning for missionary work. He was succeeded by Bishop Pallegoix (1840–62), who was instrumental in getting Napoleon III to renew the French alliance with Siam.

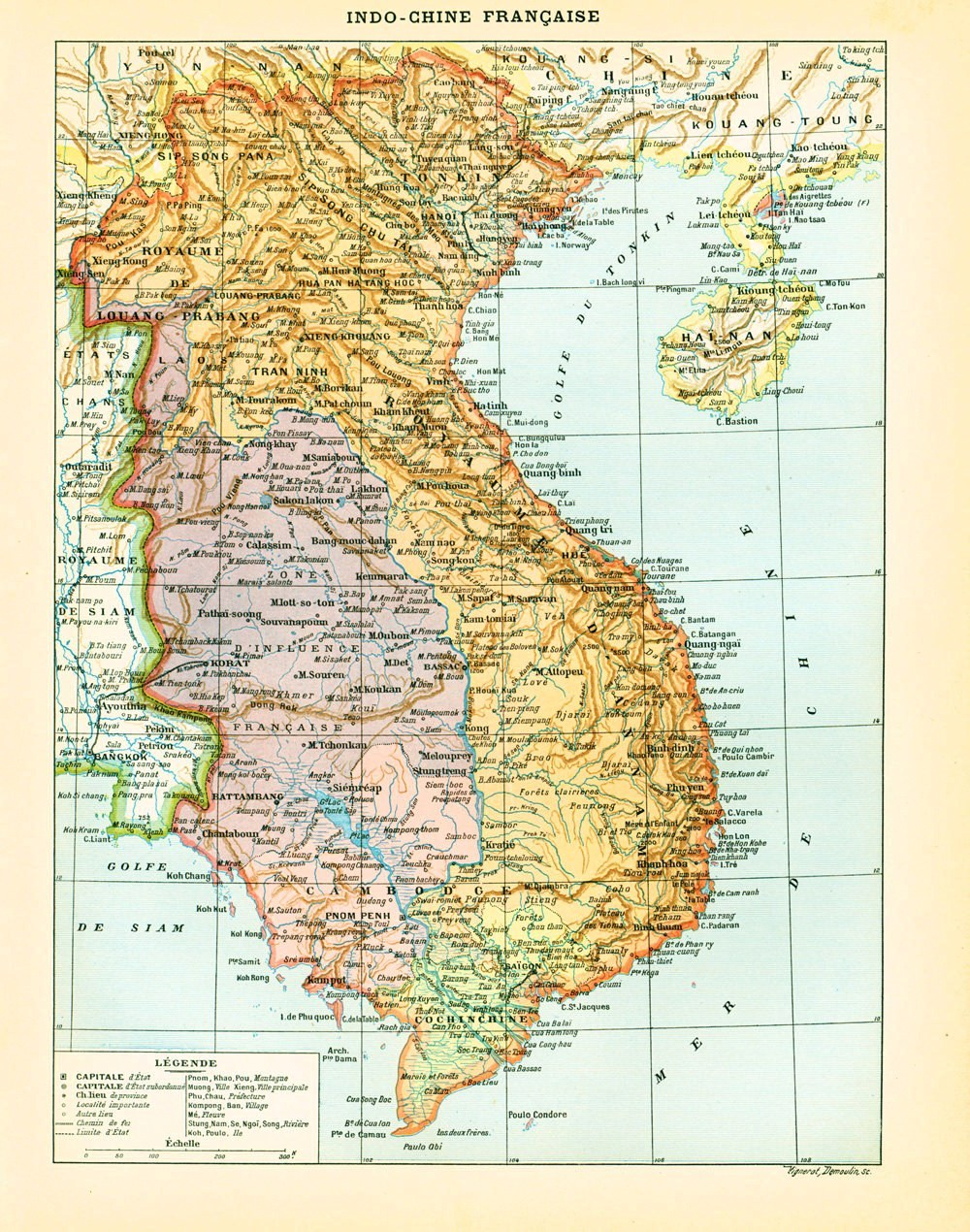
Map depicting French sphere of influence over Eastern Thailand

Some overtures were made by Thailand to establish trade relations with France in 1840 and 1851. In 1856 Napoleon III sent an embassy, led by Charles de Montigny, to King Mongkut. The Franco-Siamese Treaty of 1856 was signed on 15 August 1856, to facilitate trade, guarantee religious freedom, and grant French warships access to Bangkok. In June 1861, French warships brought a Thai embassy to France, led by Phya Sripipat (Pae Bunnag).

In the meantime, France was establishing a foothold in neighbouring Vietnam, putting it on a collision course with Siam. Under the orders of Napoleon III, French gunships under Charles Rigault de Genouilly attacked the port of Da Nang in 1858, causing significant damage, and holding the city for a few months. de Gnouilly sailed south and captured the poorly defended city of Saigon in 1859. From 1859 to 1867, French troops expanded their control over all six provinces on the Mekong delta and formed a French Colony, Cochinchina. In 1863, France and King Norodom of Cambodia signed a treaty of protection with France, which transferred the country from Siamese and Vietnamese overlordship to French colonial rule. A new treaty was signed between France and Siam on 15 July 1867.

=== Franco-Siamese crisis (1893) ===
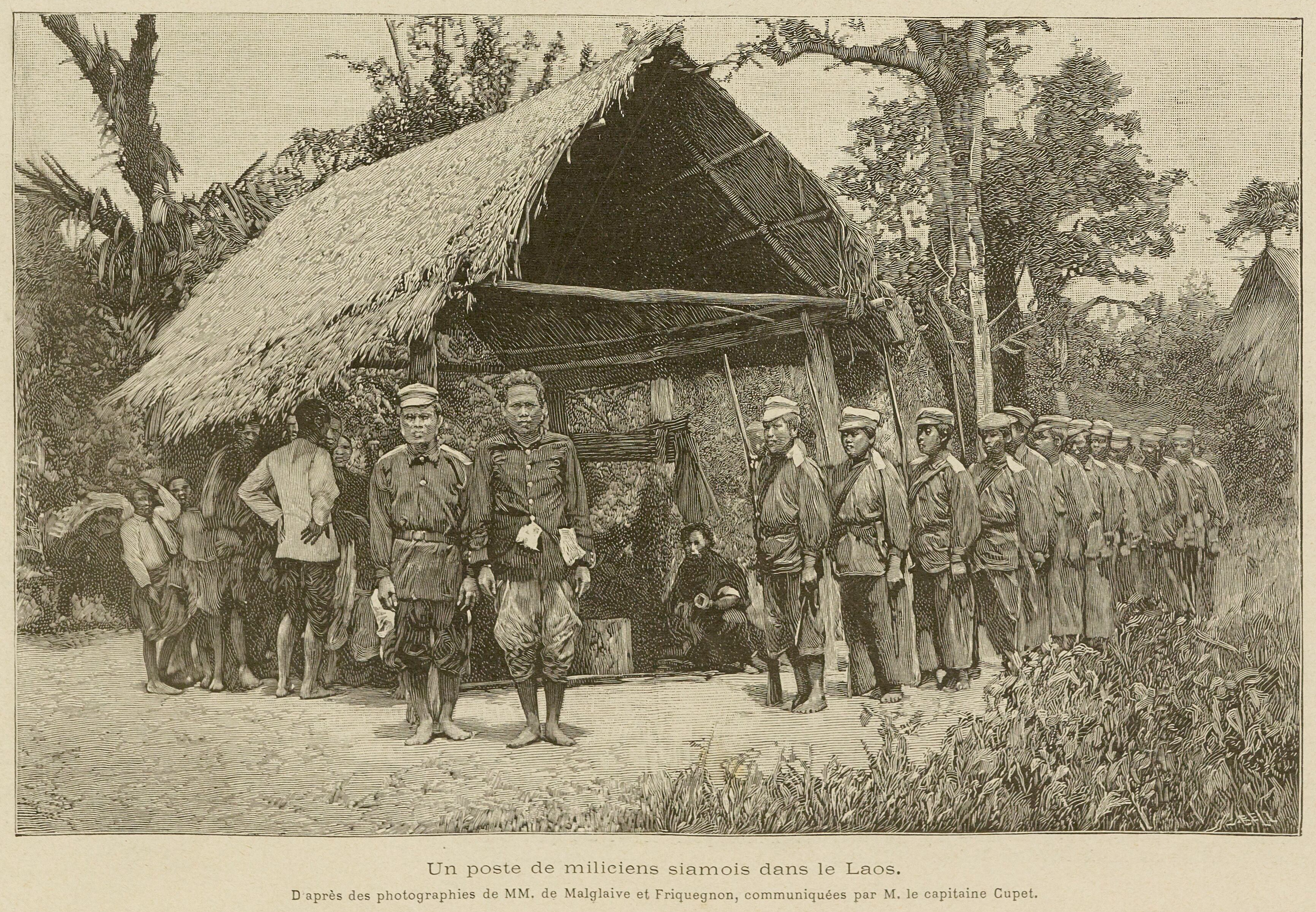
Siamese army in the disputed territory of Laos (1893)

Territorial conflict in the Indochinese peninsula for the expansion of French Indochina led to the Franco-Siamese crisis of 1893. In 1893, the French authorities in Indochina used border disputes, such as the Grosgurin affair and the Paknam naval incident, to provoke a crisis. French gunboats appeared at Bangkok, and demanded the cession of Lao territories east of the Mekong. King Chulalongkorn (reigned 1868 – 1910) appealed to the British, but the British minister advised the King to settle on whatever terms he could get from the French, indirectly indicating the British unwillingness to support the Siamese against the French. Britain's only actual gesture was an agreement with France guaranteeing the integrity of the rest of Siam. In exchange, Siam gave up its claim to the Tai-speaking Shan region of north-eastern Burma to the British, and ceded Laos to France (although it is to note that the Lao king asked for French protection in place of Siamese rule). Although Siam lost a third of its territory, the strategy of acting as a buffer zone between the two colonial superpowers preserved its independence. In response to the 1893 defeat, Chulalongkorn went abroad to study other models, visiting Paris in 1897 and 1907. As a result, he intensified his modernization program, thereby building a unitary and absolutist modern state.

== 20th century relations ==
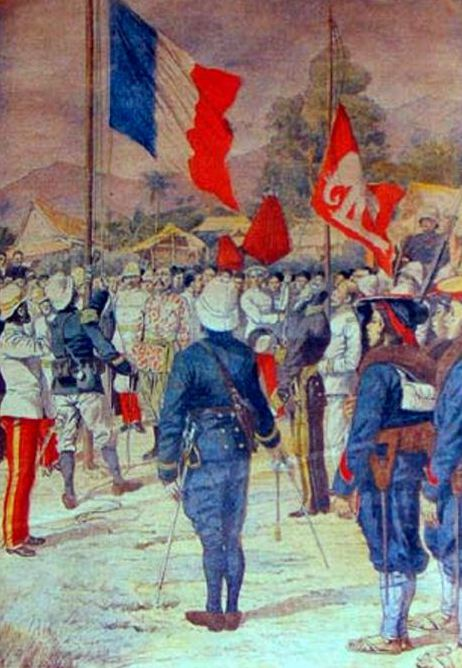
Occupation of Trat by French troops (1904)

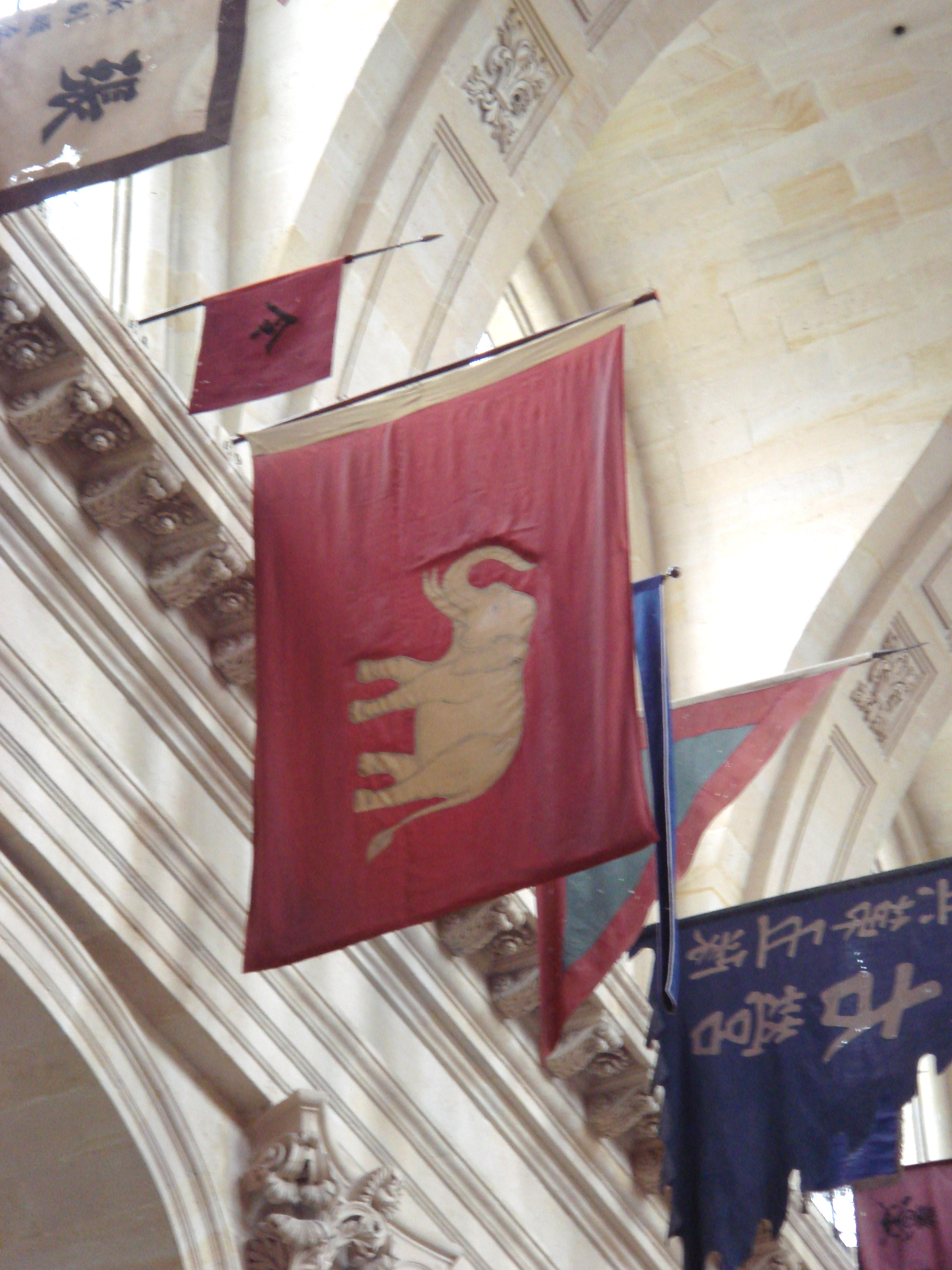
Siamese flag, taken in 1893, at Les Invalides, Paris

The French continued to pressure Siam, and in 1906–1907 they manufactured another crisis. This time Siam had to concede French control of territory on the west bank of the Mekong opposite Luang Prabang and around Champasak in southern Laos, as well as western Cambodia. France also occupied the western part of Chantaburi. In the Franco-Siamese Convention of 13 February 1904, in order to get back Chantaburi, Siam had to cede Trat to French Indochina. Trat became part of Thailand again on 23 March 1907 in exchange for areas east of the Mekong river including Battambang, Siem Reap, and Sisophon. Siam had ceded some regions of Phra Tabong and Battambang to the French as part of Indochina, which is now part of today's Cambodia.

The British interceded to prevent more French expansion against Siam, but their price, in 1909 was the acceptance of British sovereignty over Kedah, Kelantan, Perlis and Terengganu, under the Anglo-Siamese Treaty of 1909. All of these ceded territories were on the fringes of the Siamese sphere of influence and had never been securely under Siamese control, but being compelled to abandon all claim to them was a substantial humiliation to both king and country. In the early 20th century these crises were adopted by the increasingly nationalist government as symbols of the need for the country to assert itself against the West and its neighbours.

=== French-Thai War (1940–1941) ===
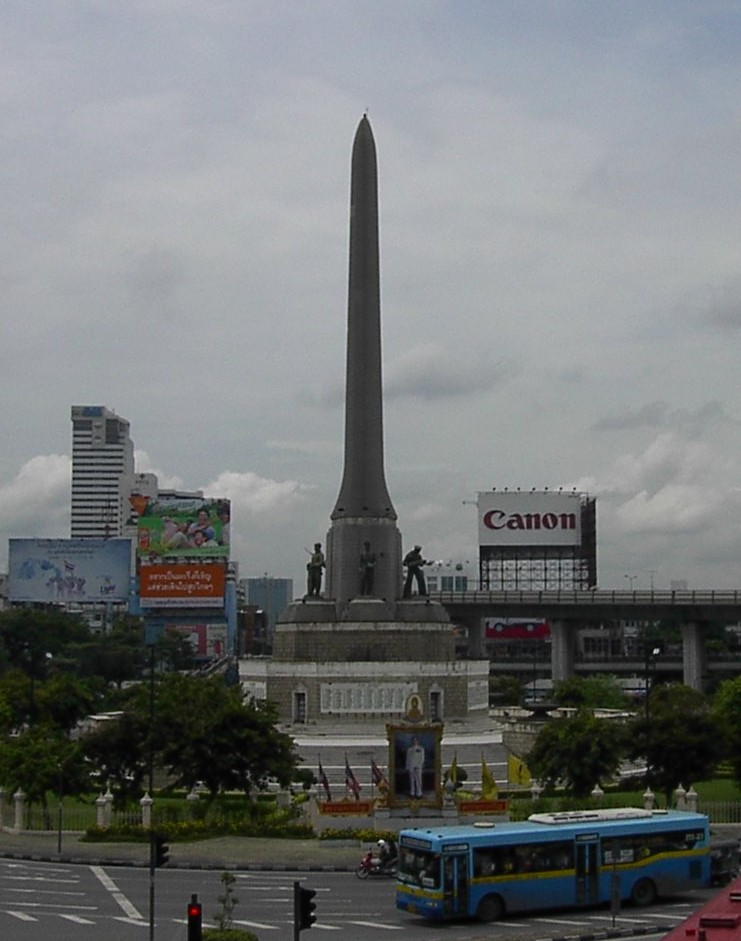
The Victory Monument, in the district of Ratchathewi on a traffic island at one of Bangkok's busiest intersections, built in 1941 to commemorate Thai victories in the French-Thai War (1940–1941)

Shortly before World War II, the French government agreed to border negotiations with Thailand which were expected to make minor changes in Thailand's favour. However, France soon fell to Hitler's forces, and the negotiations never took place. Thailand then took advantage of French weaknesses to reclaim its lost territories in French Indo-China, resulting in the French-Thai War between October 1940 and 9 May 1941. Thai military forces did well on the ground and in the air to defeat the French and regain its territory, but Thai objectives in the war were limited. In January, however, Vichy French naval forces achieved a tactical victory over Thai naval forces in the Battle of Koh Chang without much losses on both sides. The war ended in May with the help of the Japanese, allied with Nazi Germany, who coerced the French to relinquish their hold on the disputed border territories.

To commemorate the victory, Thailand erected the Victory Monument. Thailand invited Japan and Germany to join the celebration. Japan sent Shōjirō Iida, and the German Foreign Ministry sent Robert Eyssen, to join the celebration.

After the war, in October 1946, northwestern Cambodia and the two Lao enclaves on the Thai side of the Mekong River were returned to French sovereignty after the French provisional government threatened to veto Thailand's membership in the United Nations.

== Laotian and Cambodian Civil War ==
In the 1970s, Thailand conducted a secret intervention in Laos, deploying approximately 23,000 Thai troops to support the Royal Lao Army in the civil war against the Communist Pathet Lao, as Thailand's relationship with Angkar and the Khmer Rouge, who were engaged in conflict with the government of the Kingdom of Cambodia (later the Khmer Republic), shifted over time. Initially, as the Khmer Rouge gained power just before the Viet Cong in Saigon, there were attempts at establishing diplomatic relations between Thailand and Democratic Kampuchea. In 1975, after the rise of Marxist–Leninist regimes came to power in Indochina as the three communist states, the Khmer Rouge forces (backed by China from Beijing and Kim Il Sung's DPR Korea from Pyongyang, between the two communist nations) entered the capital, Phnom Penh on 17 April, ending five years of civil war and the beginning of "Year Zero" to restart Cambodian society like the French Revolution's Reign of Terror led by Robespierre that declared the Republican Calendar of 1792 as Year One. While Pathet Lao forces consolidated their control over Laos, with the Vientiane government falling in December. The National Congress of People's Representatives abolished the Laotian kingdom and established the Lao People's Democratic Republic. As the constitution in Cambodia was adopted, and the state was officially named Democratic Kampuchea, a new flag featuring a red background, with a yellow three-towered temple in the middle, compared and resembled to the flag of Vietnam under Angkar's government on 5 January 1976, which was significantly influenced by Maoism, including the policies led by its Cambodian leader Saloth Sâr ("Pol Pot"), a French phrase for Politique Potentielle became as Brother Number One, had drawn from China's Great Leap Forward and the Cultural Revolution by Chairman Mao.

== 21st century relations ==
The Franco-Thai Chamber of Commerce is active in Thailand to promote bilateral trade between France and Thailand, among other objectives.

== Resident diplomatic missions ==
- France has an embassy in Bangkok.
- Thailand has an embassy in Paris.
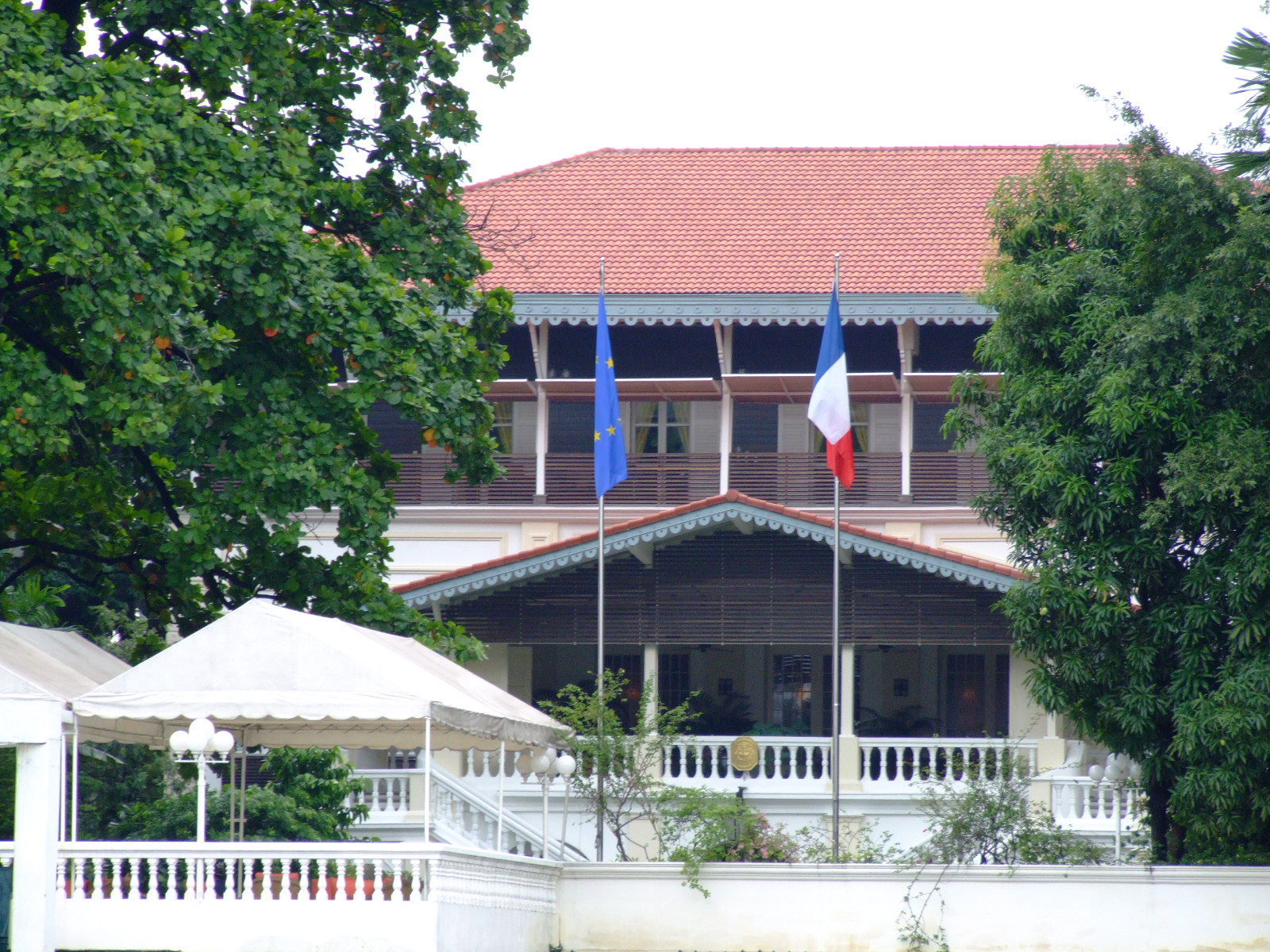
Embassy of France in Bangkok

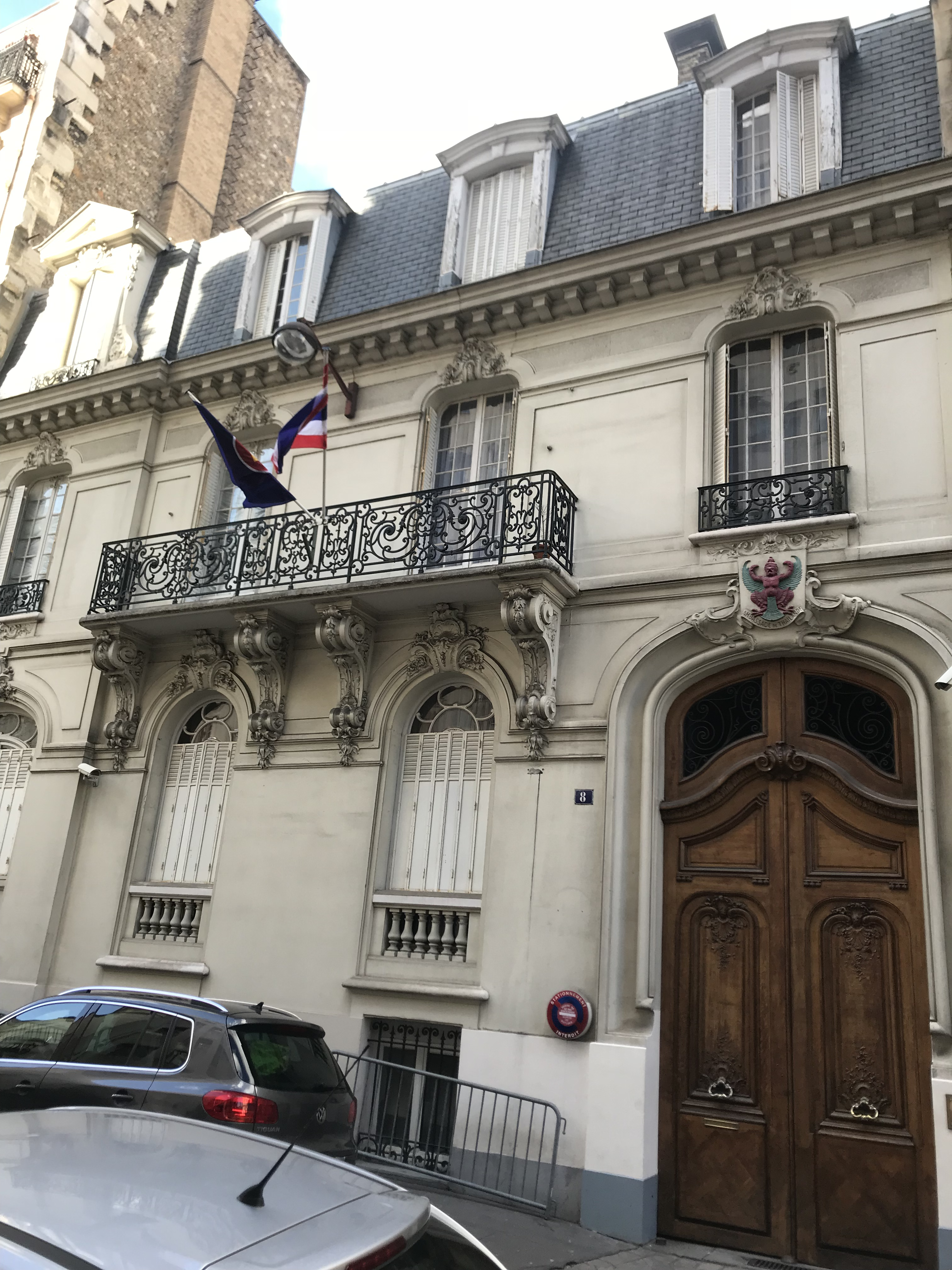
Embassy of Thailand in Paris

== See also ==
- Embassy of France, Bangkok
- France–Asia relations
- France-Burma relations
- Sip Song Chau Tai
- French Thai
