= 1688 Revolution =

1688 Revolution may refer to

- Glorious Revolution, the overthrow of King James II of England
- Siamese revolution of 1688, the overthrow of pro-foreign Siamese King Narai
