= Pierre d'Espagnac =

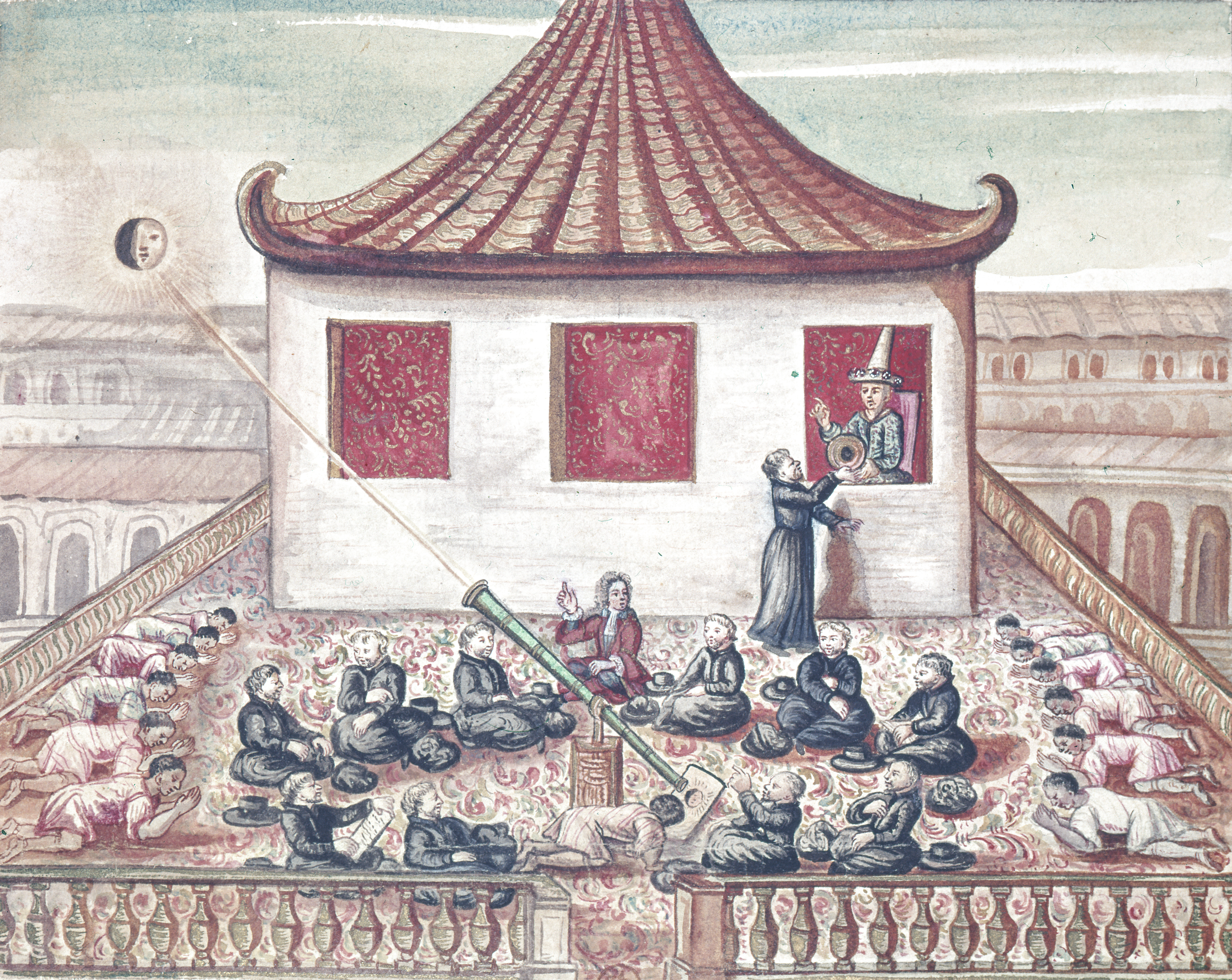
French Jesuits observing an eclipse with King Narai and his court in April 1688, shortly before the Siamese revolution

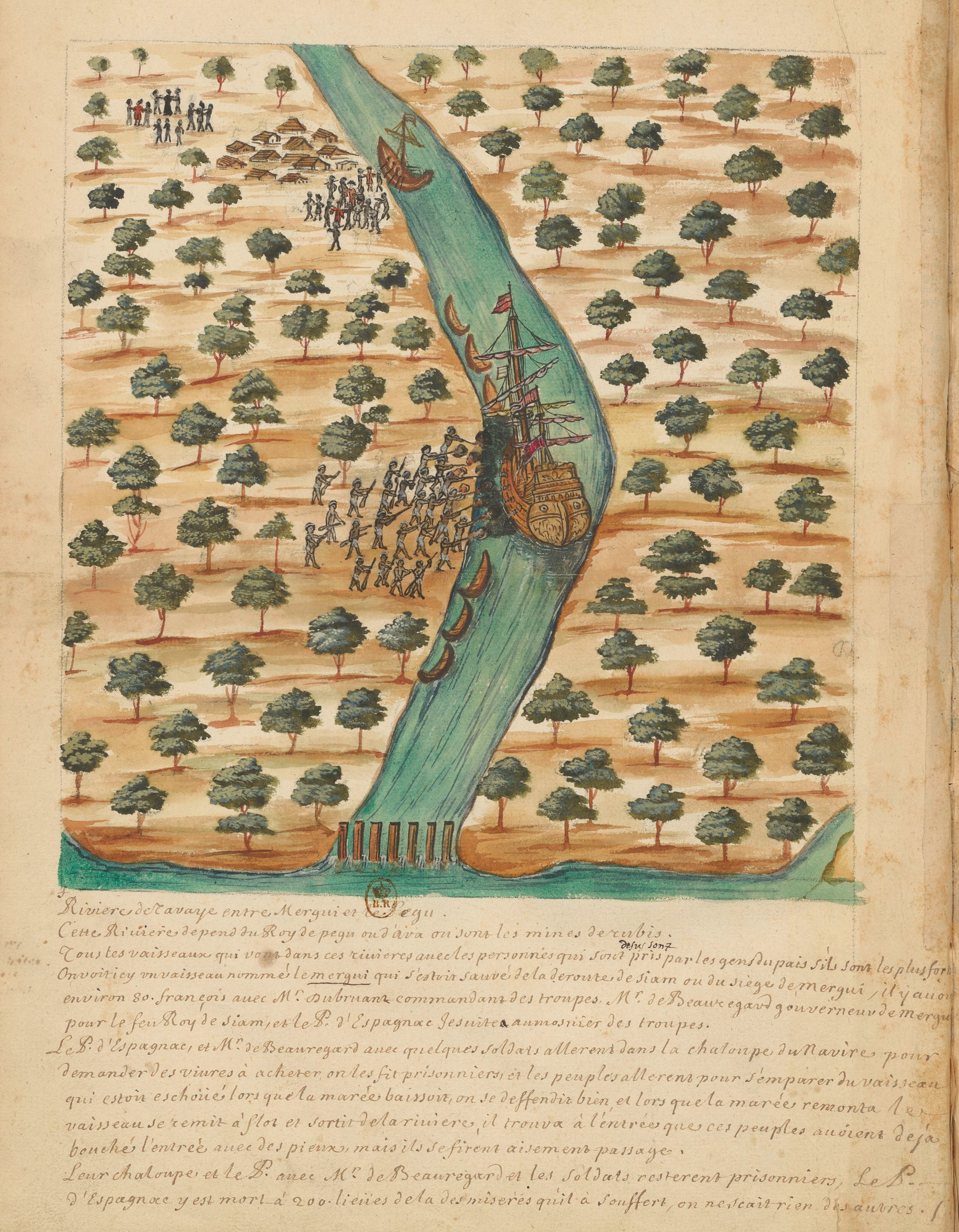
Siamese attack on du Bruant in Tavoy, in which the Chevalier de Beauregard and the Jesuit Pierre d'Espagnac were captured and enslaved.

Pierre d'Espagnac, sometimes Pierre d'Espagnal (1650–1689) was a French Jesuit missionary in Siam (modern Thailand) during the 17th century.

Pierre d'Espagnac was a member of a mission of 14 Jesuit scientists sent to Siam by Louis XIV, under the guidance of Father Guy Tachard. As the others, he was given the title of "royal mathematician" and was sponsored by the Académie française. D'Espagnac left Brest in March 1687 together with the Loubère–Céberet mission to Siam.

D'Espagnac spoke Portuguese, and served for some time as an interpreter for Constantine Phaulkon.

The Jesuits were warmly received by the Siamese king Narai, who had great interest in astronomy. They observed an eclipse with him in April 1688. Soon however, the Siamese revolted in the Siamese revolution.

Pierre d'Espagnac was next seen in Mergui, one with the French troops fleeing Mergui following the advent of the 1688 Siamese revolution. He was captured in Tavoy by the Siamese, together with the Chevalier de Beauregard and four French soldiers, as they were trying to obtain supplies for their ships. Pierre d'Espagnac seems to have been enslaved, and soon died (a year later) in slavery.

== See also ==
- France-Thailand relations
