= Siamese revolution of 1688 =

Anti-French uprising in the Ayutthaya Kingdom; new dynasty established

Siamese Revolution
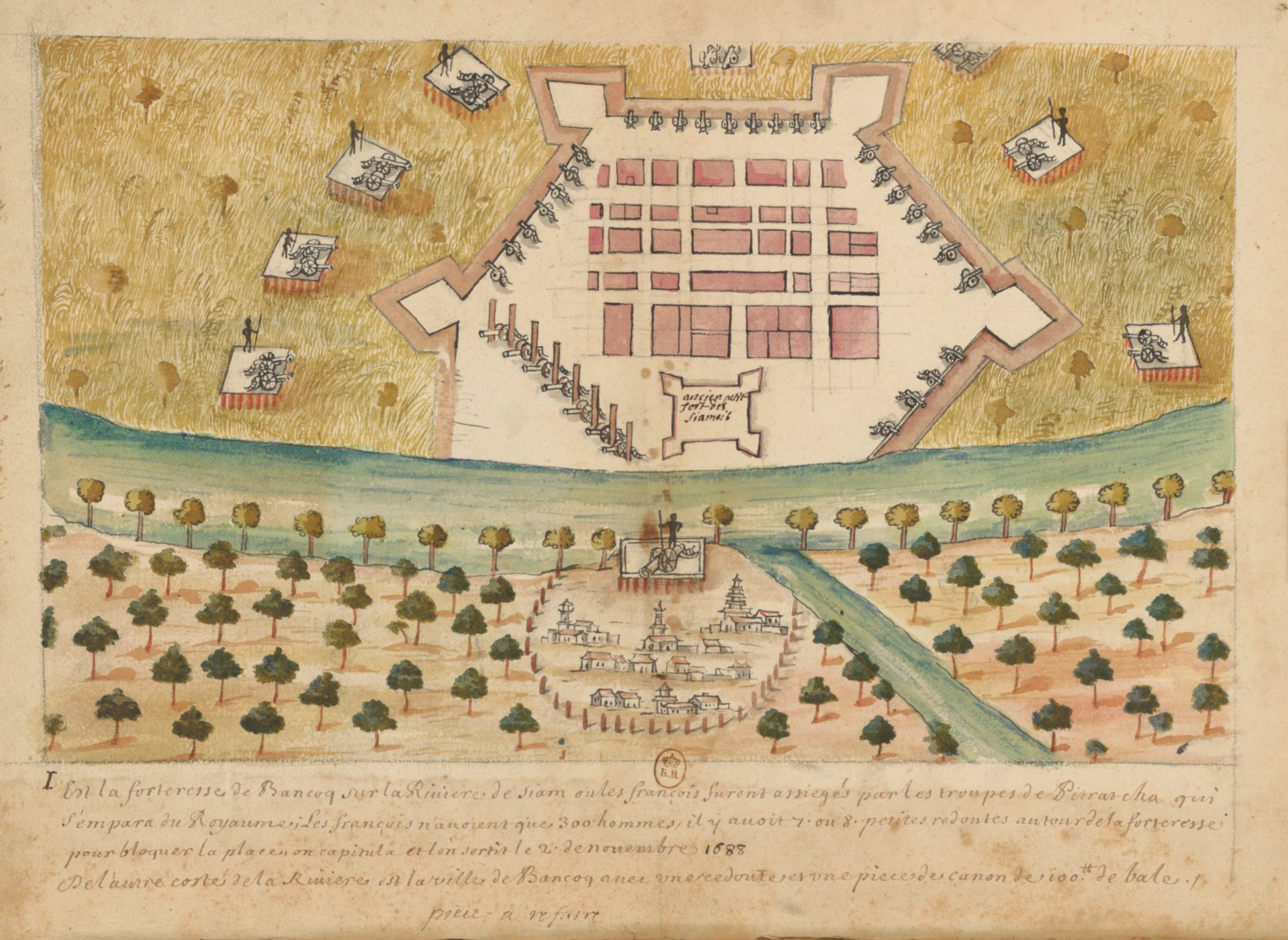
- The siege of the French fortress in Bangkok by the Siamese revolutionary forces of Phetracha in 1688.
Date	1688
Location	Siam
Result	Victory for Phetracha's forces and his Dutch allies.

Belligerents
Phetracha and various Siamese lords Dutch Republic: Dutch East India Company	Prasat Thong dynasty Kingdom of France: (Kingdom of France) French East India Company

Commanders and leaders
Phetracha; Luang Sorasak; Krommaluang Yothathep; Johan Keyts; Daniel Brochebourde	Narai #: Mom Pi (executed); Constantine Phaulkon (executed); General Desfarges Mr de Vertesalle; Chevalier de Beauregard (POW) Pierre d'Espagnac (POW)

Casualties and losses
1,000 killed	Unknown; 4 killed

The Siamese revolution of 1688 was a major popular uprising in the Siamese Ayutthaya Kingdom (modern Thailand) which led to the overthrow of the pro-French Siamese king Narai. Phetracha, previously one of Narai's trusted military advisors, took advantage of the elderly Narai's illness, and killed Narai's Christian heir, along with a number of missionaries and Narai's influential foreign minister, the Greek adventurer Constantine Phaulkon. Phetracha then married Narai's daughter, took the throne, and pursued a policy of ousting French influence and military forces from Siam. One of the most prominent battles was 1688's Siege of Bangkok, when tens of thousands of Siamese forces spent four months besieging a French fortress within the city. As a consequence of the revolution, Siam severed significant ties with the Western world, with the exception of the Dutch East India Company, until the 19th century.

== Foreign policy focus of King Narai ==
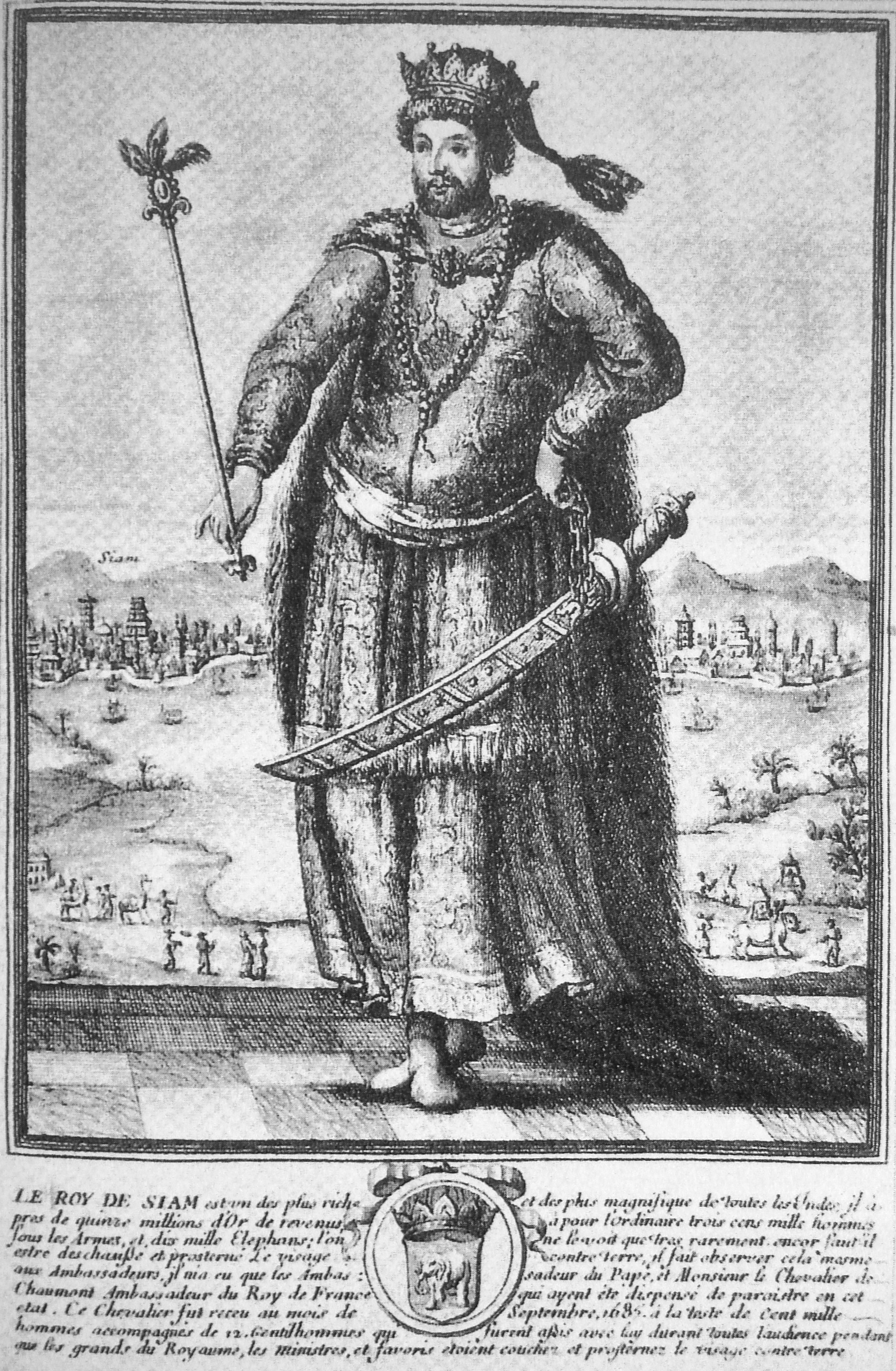
Contemporary French depiction of the King Narai of Siam

King Narai's reign saw a major expansion of diplomatic missions to and from Western powers, most notably France, England, and the Vatican. Missions were also sent and received from Persia, India and China, as well as other neighbouring states. Another notable feature of Narai's reign was the unprecedented influence of foreigners at the Siamese court, embodied in the meteoric rise of Constantine Phaulkon, a Greek adventurer who would eventually hold the modern equivalent of the post of Prime Minister.

King Narai especially sought to expand relations with the French, as a counterweight to Portuguese and Dutch influence in his kingdom, and at the suggestion of his Greek councilor Phaulkon. Numerous embassies were exchanged in both directions.

== Nationalistic upheaval ==
France sought to convert King Narai to Roman Catholicism, and also to establish troops in the area. With Narai's permission, fortresses with French troops and under French control were established at Mergui and Bangkok, in order to reaffirm the commercial treaty of 1685, provide a counterweight to Dutch influence in the region, and help to combat piracy. This disembarkment of French troops led to strong nationalist movements in Siam. By 1688, anti-foreign sentiments, mainly directed at the French and Phaulkon, were reaching their zenith. The Siamese courtiers resented the dominance of the Greek Phaulkon in state affairs, along with his Portuguese-Japanese wife and European lifestyle, while the Buddhist clergy were uneasy with the increasing prominence of the French Jesuits. The courtiers eventually formed themselves into an anti-foreign faction. Other foreigners who had established themselves in Ayutthaya before the French, in particular the Protestant Dutch and English as well as the Muslim Persians, also resented the growing political and economic influence of the Catholic French. Other established Catholic factions, such as the Portuguese, also had reason to resent the French presence, seeing it as a violation of the Treaty of Tordesillas. The increasing French influence not only increased competition but was also an unwelcome reminder of the declining fortunes of Portugal.

Matters were brought to a head when King Narai fell gravely ill in March 1688, and conspirators maneuvered to take power. In April, Phaulkon requested military help from the French in order to neutralize the plot. The French officer Desfarges responded by leading 80 troops and 10 officers out of Bangkok to the Palace in Lopburi. However, he stopped on the way in Ayutthaya and finally abandoned his plan and retreated to Bangkok, fearing that he could be attacked by Siamese rebels, and troubled by false rumors, some spread by Véret, the Director of the French East India Company, including one that the king had already died.

== Succession crisis ==
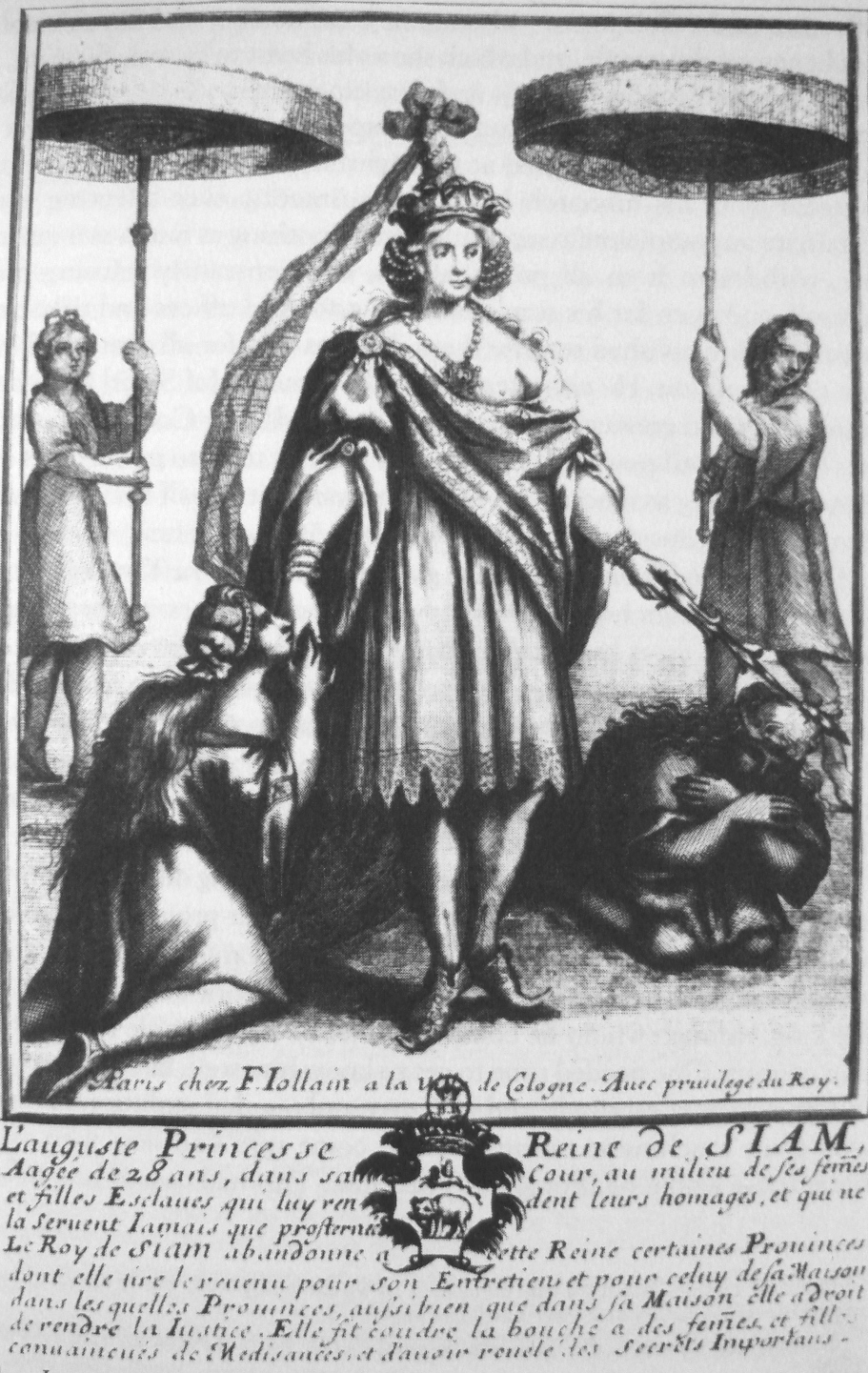
Krommaluang Yothathep, daughter and only child of king Narai, was named regent on May 10, 1688.

On May 10, the dying King Narai, aware of the coming succession dispute, called together his closest councilors – the Greek councilor Phaulkon; the king's foster brother and Commander of the Royal Elephant Corps, Phra Phetracha; and the King's adopted son Mom Pi. Narai nominated his daughter, Krommaluang Yothathep, to succeed him. His three councilors were to act as regents until the princess took on a partner of her choice from one of the two Siamese councilors, Mom Pi or Phetracha.

Far from calming the situation, Narai's decision spurred Phetracha to act. With Narai essentially incapacitated by his illness, Phetracha staged a long-planned coup d'etat with the support of a resentful court as well as the Buddhist clergy, initiating the 1688 Siamese revolution. On May 17–18, 1688, King Narai was arrested. On June 5, Phaulkon was arrested on accusations of treason, and later beheaded. Mom Pi was killed, and many members of Narai's family were assassinated. Both of the king's brothers, his successors by right, were killed on July 9, and King Narai himself died in detention on July 10–11, with his death possibly hastened by poisoning. Phra Phetracha was crowned king on August 1. Kosa Pan, the 1686 former ambassador to France, and a strong supporter of Phetracha, became his Minister of Foreign Affairs and Trade.

Princess Krommaluang Yothathep ultimately had to marry Phetracha and become his queen.

== Ousting of French forces (1688) ==
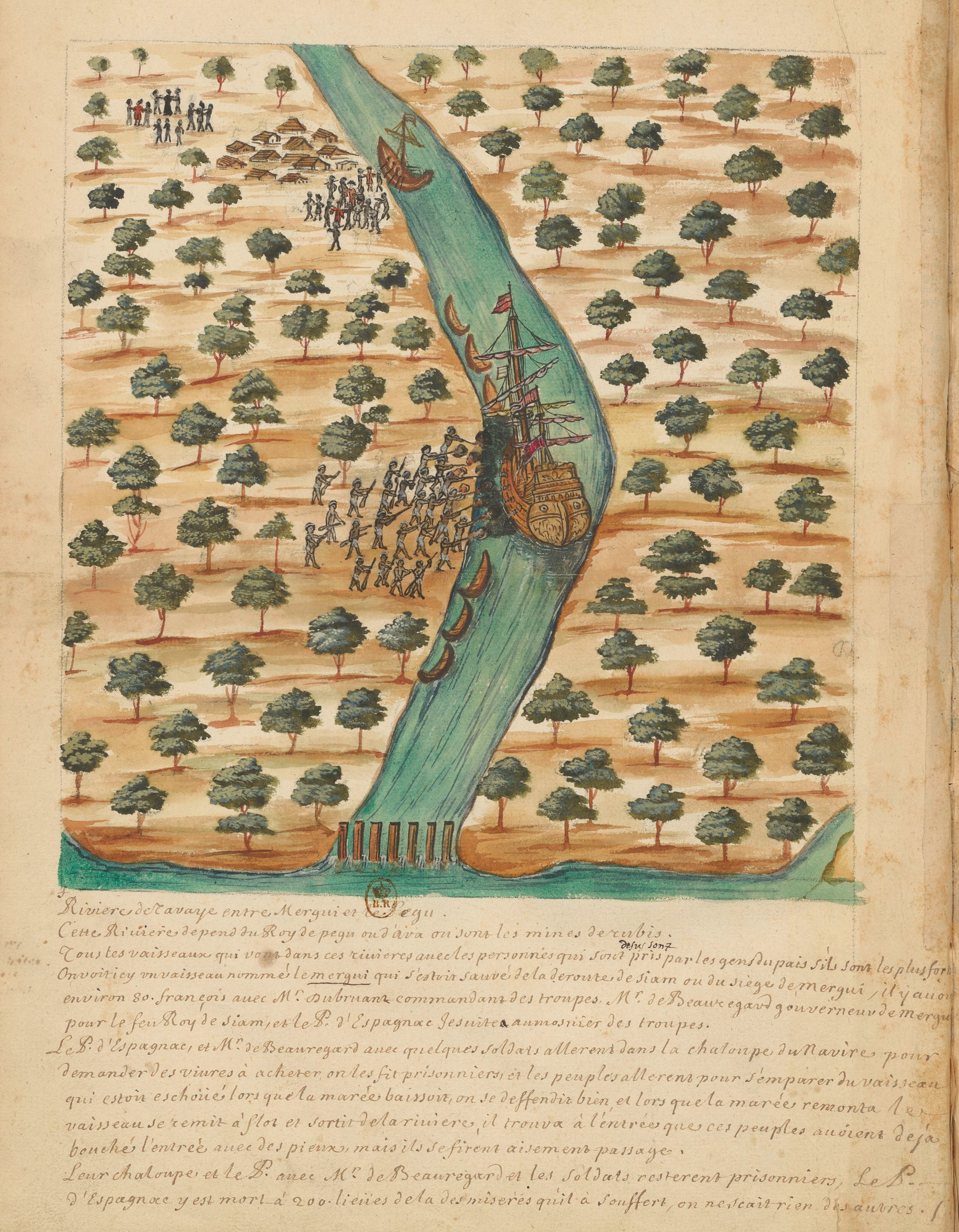
Siamese attack on du Bruant in Tavoy, in which the Chevalier de Beauregard and the Jesuit Pierre d'Espagnac were captured and enslaved.

Large-scale attacks were launched on the two French fortresses in Siam, and on June 24, 1688, the French under du Bruant and the Chevalier de Beauregard had to abandon their garrison at Mergui. Du Bruant managed to escape under fire and with many casualties by seizing a Siamese warship, the Mergui. He and his troops were stranded on a deserted island for four months before being captured by an English ship. They ultimately returned to Pondicherry by way of Madras.

In the Siege of Bangkok, Phetracha besieged the French fortress in Bangkok with 40,000 men and over a hundred cannon, for a period of four months. The Siamese troops also apparently received Dutch support in their fight against the French. On September 9, the French warship Oriflamme, carrying 200 troops and commanded by de l'Estrilles, arrived at the mouth of the Chao Phraya River, but was unable to dock at the Bangkok fortress as the entrance to the river was being blocked by the Siamese.

Phaulkon's Catholic Japanese-Portuguese wife, Maria Guyomar de Pinha, who had been promised protection by being ennobled a countess of France, took refuge with the French troops in Bangkok, but Desfarges returned her to the Siamese under pressure from Phetracha on October 18. Despite the promises that had been made regarding her safety, she was condemned to perpetual slavery in the kitchens of Phetracha. Desfarges finally negotiated to return with his men to Pondicherry on November 13, on board the Oriflamme and two Siamese ships, the Siam and the Louvo, provided by Phetracha.

Some of the French troops remained in Pondicherry to bolster the French presence there, but most left for France on February 16, 1689 aboard the French Navy Normande and the French Company Coche, with the engineer Vollant des Verquains and the Jesuit Le Blanc aboard. The two ships were captured by the Dutch at The Cape, however, because the War of the Augsburg League had started. After a month in the Cape, the prisoners were sent to Zeeland where they were kept at the prison of Middelburg. They were eventually able to return to France through a general exchange of prisoners.

On April 10, 1689, the French officer Desfarges—who had remained in Pondicherry—led an expedition to capture the island of Phuket in an attempt to restore some sort of French control in Siam. The occupation of the island led nowhere, and Desfarges returned to Pondicherry in January 1690. Recalled to France, he left 108 troops in Pondicherry to bolster defenses, and left with his remaining troops on the Oriflamme and the Company ships Lonré and Saint-Nicholas on February 21, 1690. Desfarges died on his way back trying to reach Martinique, and the Oriflamme sank shortly thereafter on February 27, 1691, with most of the remaining French troops, off the coast of Brittany.

A Siamese-formed rebellion led by Thammathian broke out in 1690 against Phetracha's rule, but was suppressed. The governors of several regional provinces likewise refused to accept Phetracha's rule, and stood in rebellion until 1691. Phetracha's reign lasted until 1703, when he died and was succeeded by his eldest son Sanphet VIII.

A contemporary who participated in the events, the French engineer Jean Vollant des Verquains, wrote in 1691 about its historical significance: "The revolution which occurred in the Kingdom of Siam in the year 1688 is one of the most famous events of our times, whether it is considered from the point of view of politics or religion."

== Aftermath ==
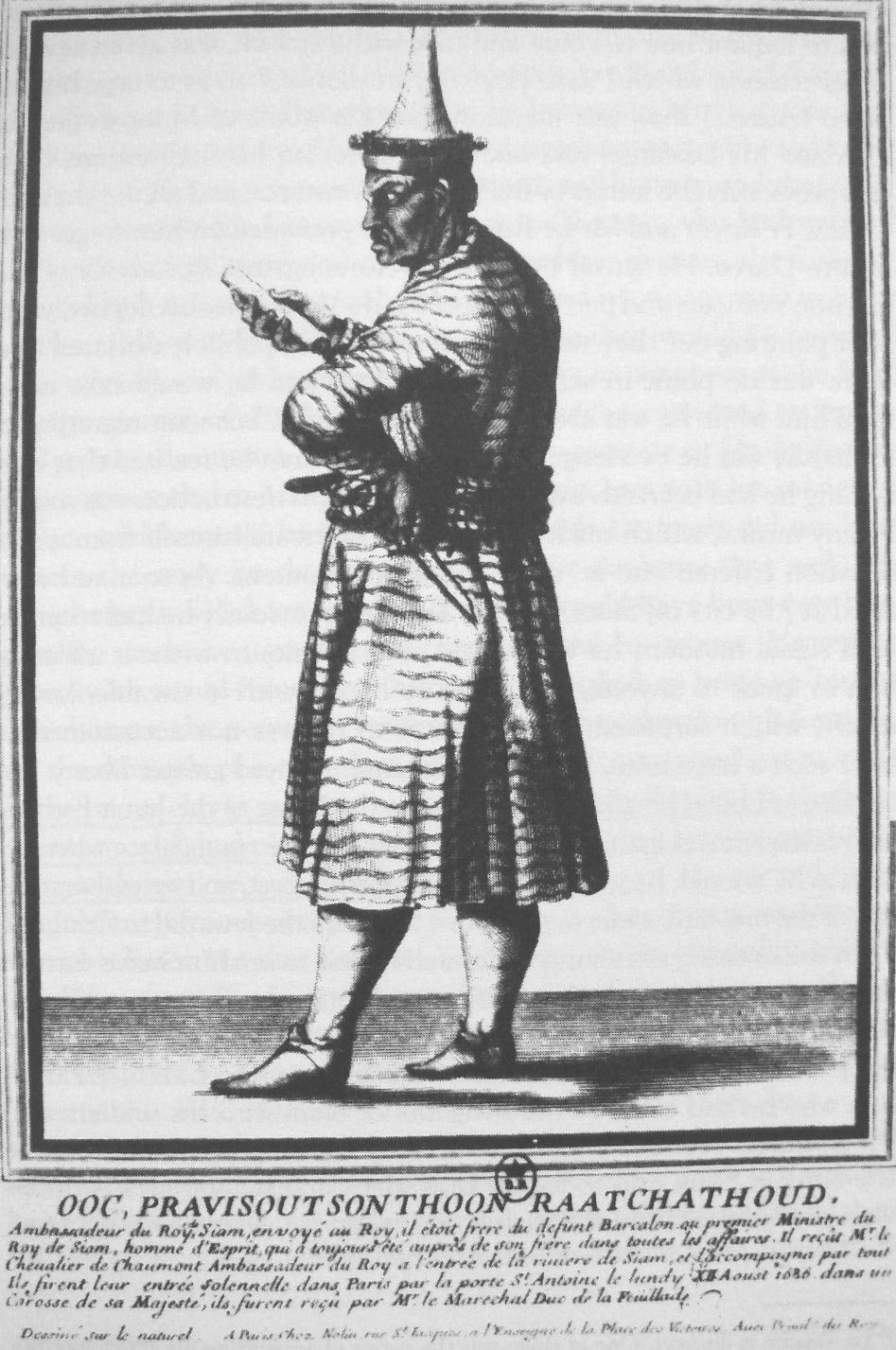
Kosa Pan, former ambassador to France in 1686, became the new Minister of Foreign Affairs and Trade after the revolution, under the new ruler Phetracha.

France was unable to stage a comeback or organize a retaliation due to its involvement in major European conflicts: the War of the League of Augsburg (1688–1697), and then the War of the Spanish Succession (1701–1713/1714).

In Siam, Phetracha had managed to expel most of the French from the country, but after an initial confinement, missionaries were allowed to continue their work in Ayutthaya, albeit with some restrictions. The Bishop of Ayutthaya Monseigneur Louis Laneau was only released from jail in April 1691. A few French employees of the king, such as René Charbonneau, former governor of Phuket, were also allowed to remain.

Not all contacts with the West were severed however. On November 14, immediately after the French retreat, the 1644 Treaty and Alliance of Peace between Siam and the Dutch East India Company was renewed, guaranteeing the Dutch their previously agreed deerskin export monopoly, and giving them freedom to trade freely in Siamese ports. They also obtained a renewal of their export monopoly on Ligor for tin (originally granted by king Narai in 1671). Dutch factors (Opperhoofden) were also stationed at Ayutthaya, such as Pieter van den Hoorn (from 1688 to 1691), or Thomas van Son (from 1692 to 1697). Contact between Siam and the West remained sporadic, however, and would not return to the level seen in the reign of King Narai until the reign of King Mongkut in the mid-19th century.

Western contacts aside, trade relations with Asian countries remained buoyant, with Siam remaining especially involved in the Sino-Siamese-Japanese trade. During the reign of Phetracha, about 50 Chinese junks are recorded to have visited Ayutthaya, and during the same period as many as 30 junks left Ayutthaya for Nagasaki, Japan.

The official resumption of contacts with the West started with the Treaty of Amity and Commerce with the United Kingdom in 1826. Diplomatic exchanges with the United States started in 1833. France did not resume official contacts until 1856, when Napoleon III sent an embassy to King Mongkut led by Charles de Montigny. A Treaty was signed on August 15, 1856 to facilitate trade, guarantee religious freedom, and allow the access of French warships to Bangkok. In June 1861, French warships brought a Thai embassy to France, led by Phya Sripipat (Pae Bunnag).

== See also ==
- 1893 Franco-Siamese crisis
- Paknam Incident
- 1940-41 Franco-Thai War
- French Indochina
- Battle of Dien Bien Phu
