= Chevalier de Beauregard =

The Chevalier de Beauregard (c.1665–c.1692) was a 17th-century French officer who was active in Siam (modern Thailand). He became Governor of Bangkok and Mergui, but was eventually captured by the Siamese during the 1688 Siamese revolution.

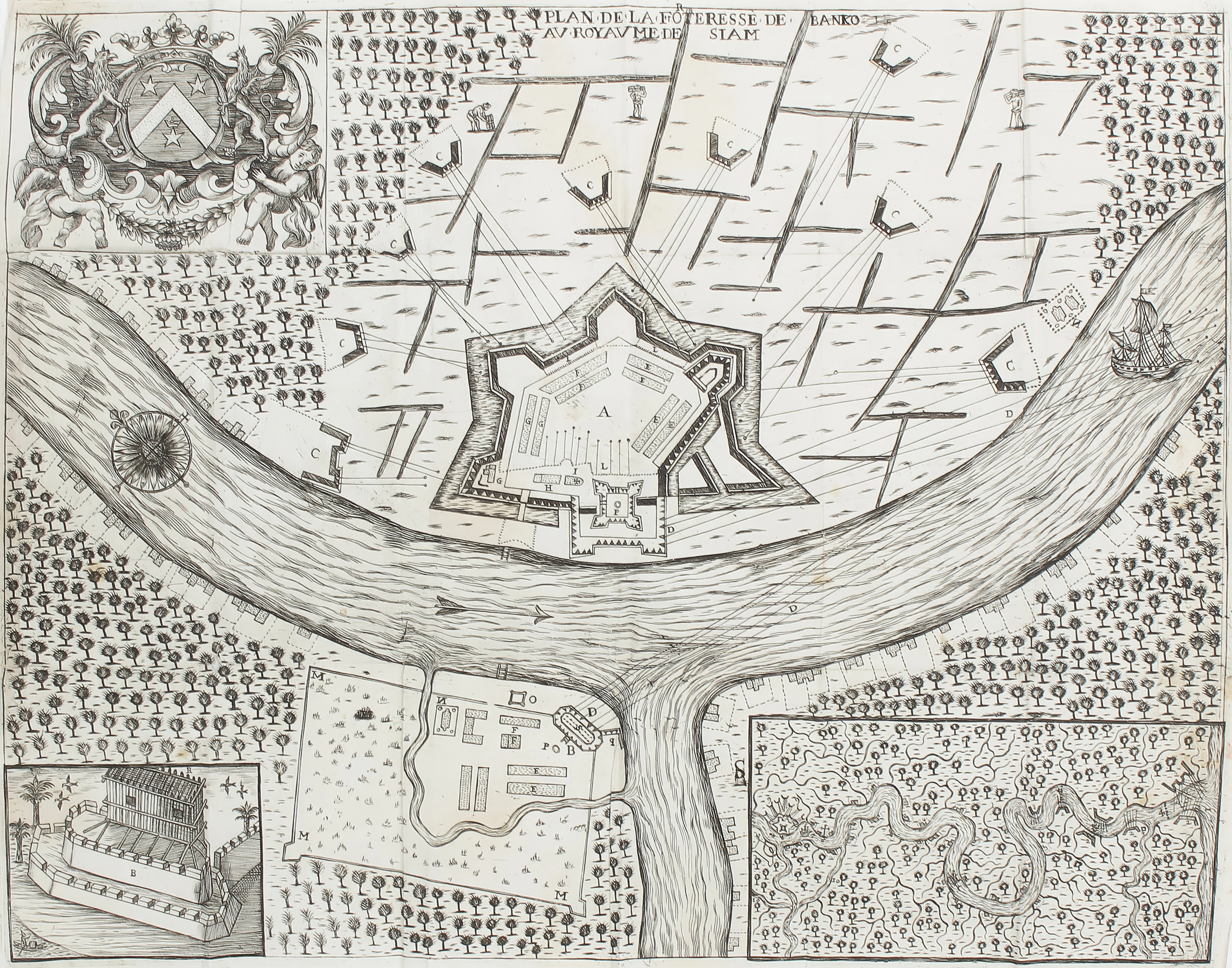
The Chevalier de Beauregard was briefly commander of the French fortress of Bangkok, after Claude de Forbin returned to France.

De Beauregard went to Siam in 1685, with the embassy of Chevalier de Chaumont. He was transferred to the garrison of Bangkok, under the command of Chevalier Claude de Forbin.

In July 1686, when the fort was attacked by a band of pirates from Makassar, de Beauregard's belly was slit open with a dagger, but his commander de Forbin managed to replace the viscera and sew him up, making him the first recorded case of a Western-style surgical intervention in Thailand.

As I drew near the bed and examined the young man more strictly, I saw that he breathed still, but he could not speak and his mouth as all in a froth. I found his belly open and his very entrails and stomach hanging out upon his thighs. Not knowing what to do to help him, because I had no remedy nor surgeon, I ventured to manage him in the best manner I could myself. Having to this end provided a couple of needles and some silk, I restored his entrails to their place, and sew the wound up, in the manner as I had before observed on the like occasions. I then made a couple of ligatures, which I tied together, and after having beat the white of an egg and mingled it with some fied [sic] it for ten days together upon the patient, with such success that he was cured. Indeed Beauregard never had any fever, or other bad symptom. I observed that when I replaced his entrails in his belly, they were grown as dry as parchment, and clotted with coagulated blood, yet it did not hinder the perfect cure which followed in a few days.

In 1687 de Beauregard briefly replaced Forbin as governor of Bangkok.

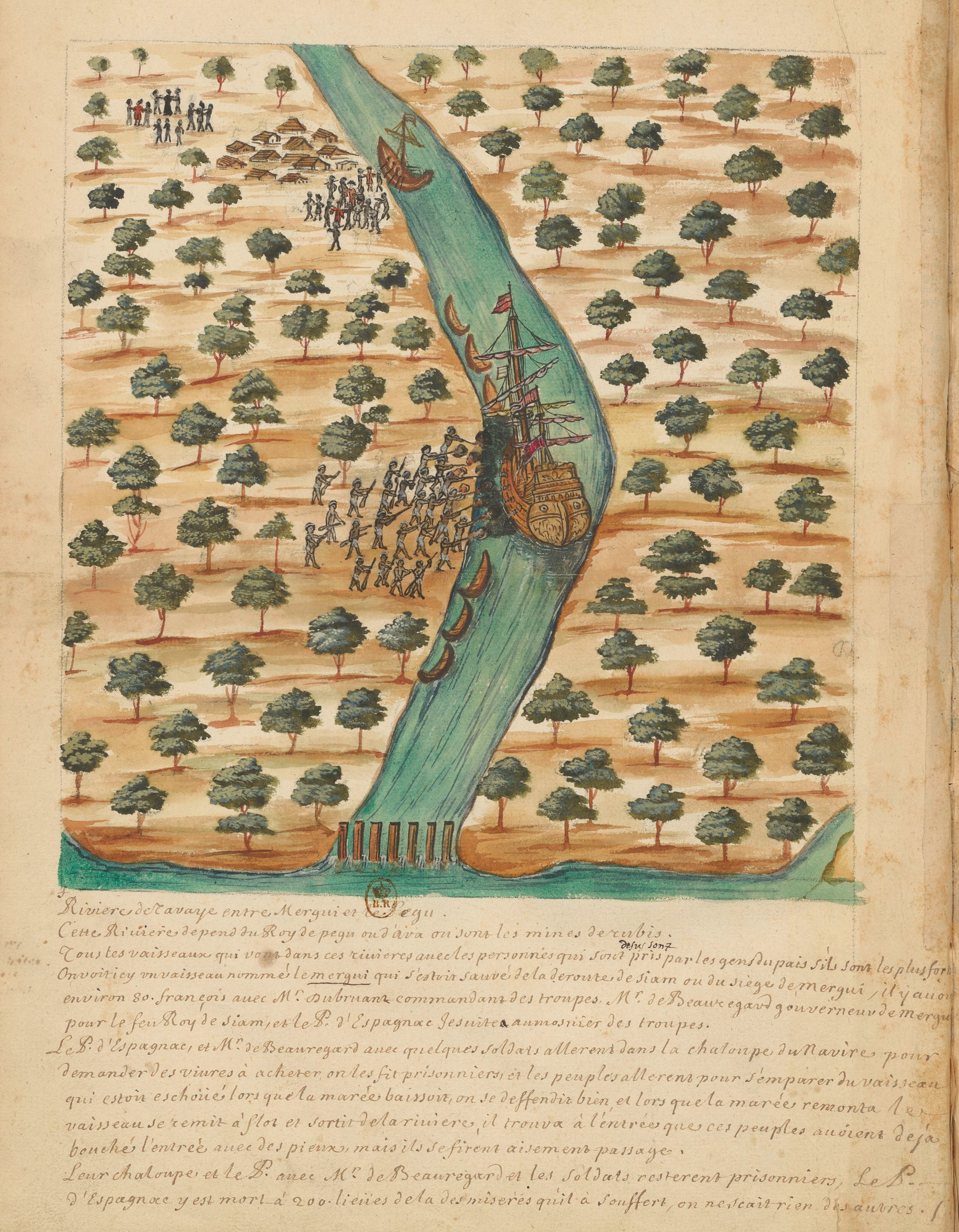
Siamese attack and capture of de Beauregard and other French nationals in Tavoy in 1688

De Beauregard was then made governor of the city of Mergui after the revolt against the English there in July 1687. De Beauregard was named governor by King Narai of Siam in the place of the Englishman, Samuel White.

De Beauregard was part of the retreat of the French troops of De Bruant there, following the 1688 Siamese revolution. Large-scale attacks were launched on the two French fortresses in Siam, Bangkok and Mergui, and on 24 June, the French had to abandon their garrison at Mergui. Du Bruant and de Beauregard managed to escape under fire and with many casualties by seizing a Siamese warship, the Mergui.

De Beauregard was eventually captured by the Siamese in Tavoy when the French ships from Mergui tried to obtain some victuals there, together with four soldiers and the Jesuit Pierre d'Espagnac. The captives seem to have been enslaved.

== See also ==
- France-Thailand relations
