= René Charbonneau =

French missionary

René Charbonneau was 17th century French medical missionary friar and a member of the Siam mission of the Société des Missions Etrangères. He was the first medical missionary to Siam. He arrived in the country in 1677.

René Charbonneau first provided his services to the Siamese King Narai as an architect, to establish a wooden fort on the frontier with the country of Pegu.

In 1681 or 1682, King Narai, who was seeking to reduce Dutch and English influence, named René Charbonneau the Governor of the island of Phuket, a position which he held until 1685. Phuket was already highly valued at that time for its production of tin. Charbonneau had received orders from King Narai to allow ships of all nations to trade freely in Phuket. In 1686, Charbonneau was replaced in this position by Sieur de Billy, the former maître d'hôtel of the French ambassador to Siam, Chevalier de Chaumont.

René Charbonneau worked as a nurse in the French hospital established in 1669 in Ayutthaya by the Catholic Bishops Lambert and Ballue, with Father Laneau as the chief physician. The hospital provided medical care to about 200-300 people daily.

== See also ==
- France-Thailand relations
