= Sudawadi =

Yothathep โยธาเทพ
- Princess consort of Ayutthaya; Princess Yothathep
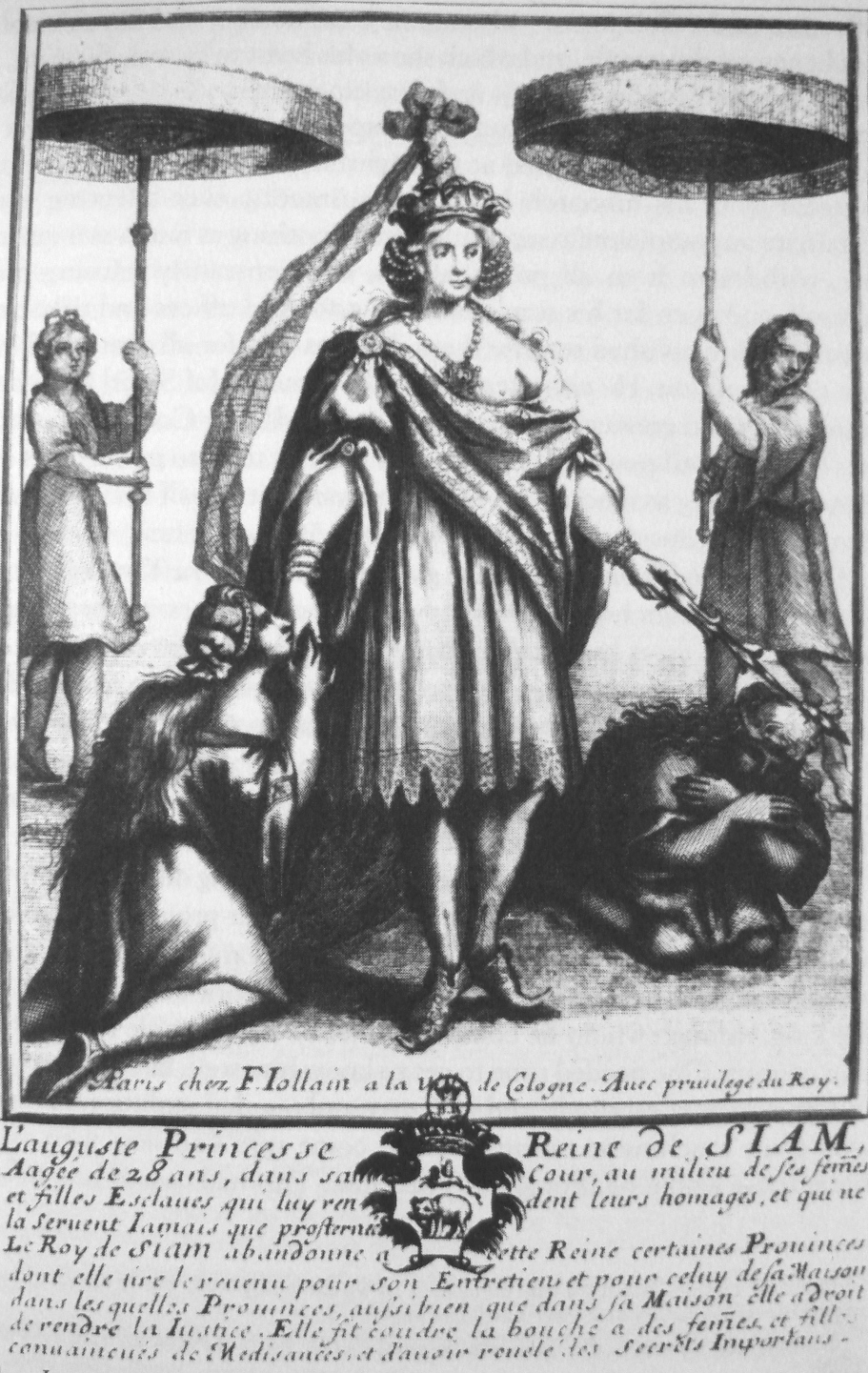
- Princess Yothathep in a French engraving by François Jollain, c. 1688
- Born: Sudawadi (also spelled Sudathewi); 1656
- Died: 1735 (aged 78–79)
- Spouse: Phetracha
- Issue: Prince Tratnoi
Names
- Yothathep
- Thai: โยธาเทพ (Yothathep) สุดาวดี (Sudawadi) สุดาเทวี (Sudathewi)
- Dynasty: Prasat Thong
- Father: Narai
- Mother: Kasattri

Princess Yothathep (Thai: กรมหลวงโยธาเทพ, RTGS: Krom Luang Yothathep), born Sudawadi (Thai: สุดาวดี; 1656–1735) was the only child of Narai and Princess Suriyong Ratsami, one of his concubines. She lived through five reigns and died in the reign of King Borommakot.

== Biography ==
Princess Yothathep was the only daughter and only child of Narai and Queen Kasattri, one of his concubines. During her father's reign, she took over many duties about the palace when her mother died, such as caring for the ladies in-waiting and eunuchs. The highest honor she was a Royal master's degree.

During the reign of King Phetracha, she married the King and received the title of Left Consort, but she disapproved of King Phetracha because he had ordered his guards to kill her father's brothers. King Phetracha later married Princess Sisuphan, the Princess Yothathip, who was her father's sister, and promoted Princess Sisuphan to Right Consort.

== Death ==
After the death of Phetracha, Suriyenthrathibodi, the secret son of King Narai and Princess Kusavadi of Chiangmai adopted by King Phetracha, stole the throne of Ayutthaya from Prince Khwan, son of King Phetracha and Princess Sisuphan. Princess Sudawadi and her son, Prince Tratnoi, moved out to live with her relatives. She lived peacefully and died in 1735 during the reign of King Borommakot.

== Gallery ==
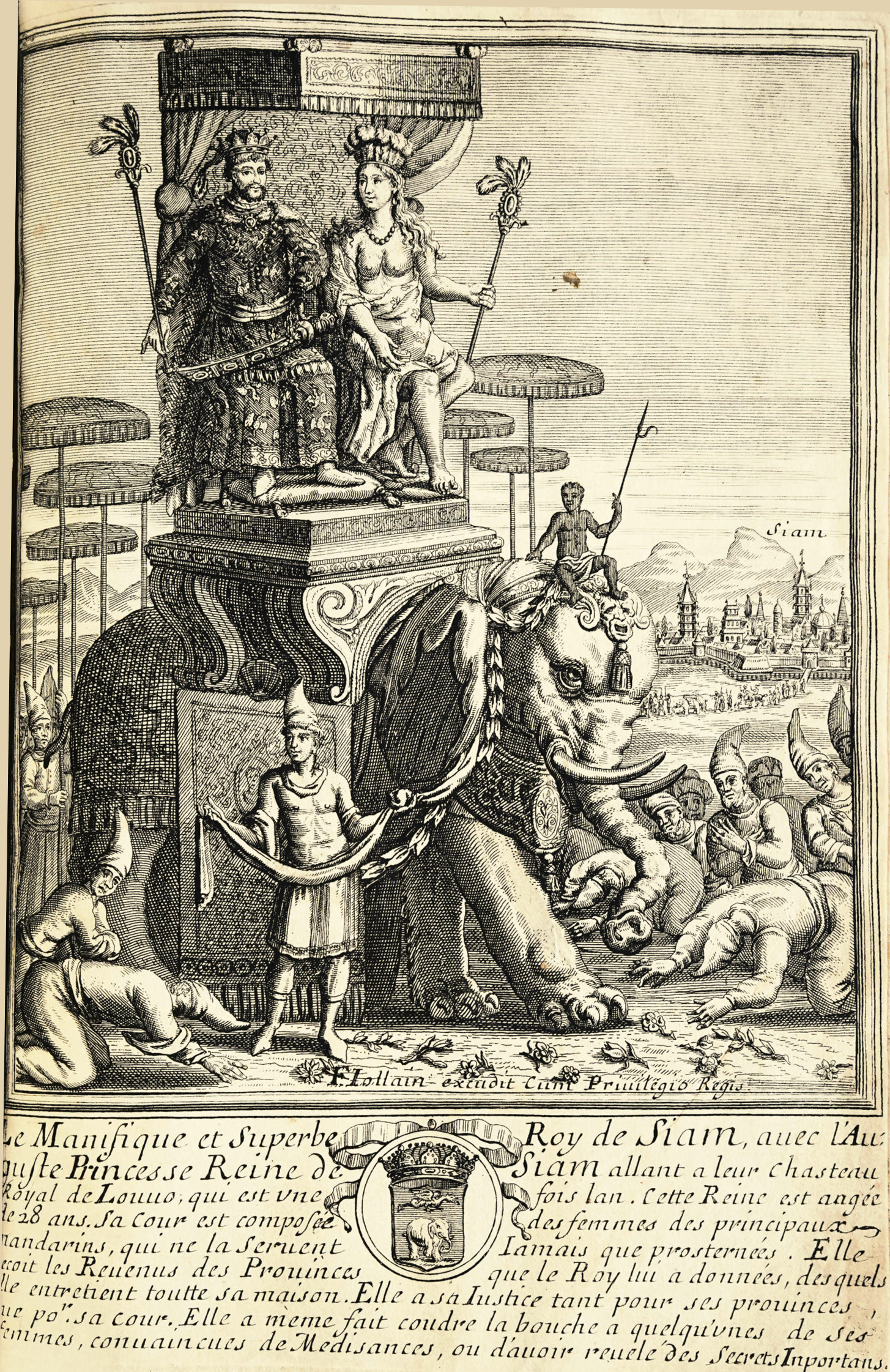
King Narai of Siam and Princess Yothathep on Elephant
