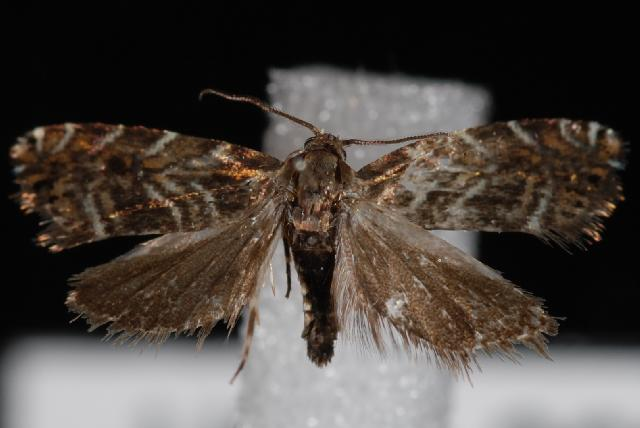
- Thaumatographa youngiella

Scientific classification
- Kingdom: Animalia
- Phylum: Arthropoda
- Clade: Pancrustacea
- Class: Insecta
- Order: Lepidoptera
- Family: Tortricidae
- Subfamily: Chlidanotinae
- Tribe: Hilarographini
- Genus: Thaumatographa; Walsingham, 1897

Species
- See text

Synonyms
- Tharmatographa Diakonoff, 1977

= Thaumatographa =

Genus of moths

Thaumatographa is a genus of moths belonging to the family Tortricidae.

== Species ==
- Thaumatographa aurosa Diakonoff & Arita, 1976
- Thaumatographa calathisca Meyrick, 1909
- Thaumatographa caminodes Meyrick, 1905
- Thaumatographa ceramopa Meyrick, 1920
- Thaumatographa cirrhocosma Meyrick, 1930
- Thaumatographa citharistis Meyrick, 1909
- Thaumatographa cladara Diakonoff, 1977
- Thaumatographa crocochorista Meyrick, 1930
- Thaumatographa cubensis Heppner, 1983
- Thaumatographa cymatodes Diakonoff, 1983
- Thaumatographa decoris Diakonoff & Arita, 1976
- Thaumatographa dolichosticha Diakonoff, 1977
- Thaumatographa eremnotorna Diakonoff & Arita, 1976
- Thaumatographa excellens Pagenstecher, 1900
- Thaumatographa ferox Meyrick, 1921
- Thaumatographa hermatodes Meyrick, 1909
- Thaumatographa jonesi Brower, 1953
- Thaumatographa leucopyrga Meyrick, 1912
- Thaumatographa ludens Diakonoff, 1948
- Thaumatographa macaria Diakonoff, 1977
- Thaumatographa machaerophora Diakonoff & Arita, 1976
- Thaumatographa mechanica Meyrick, 1909
- Thaumatographa merinthias Meyrick, 1909
- Thaumatographa mesostigmatis Diakonoff, 1977
- Thaumatographa oenobapta Diakonoff, 1977
- Thaumatographa opistocapna Diakonoff, 1977
- Thaumatographa pampoecila Turner, 1913
- Thaumatographa phlox Diakonoff, 1977
- Thaumatographa regalis Walsingham, 1881
- Thaumatographa spermatodesma Diakonoff, 1955
- Thaumatographa tetralina Meyrick, 1930
- Thaumatographa tornoxena Diakonoff, 1977
- Thaumatographa undosa Diakonoff, 1977
- Thaumatographa youngiella Busck, 1922
- Thaumatographa zapyra Meyrick, 1886
