= Heppnerographa =

Scientific classification
- Kingdom: Animalia
- Phylum: Arthropoda
- Clade: Pancrustacea
- Class: Insecta
- Order: Lepidoptera
- Family: Tortricidae
- Tribe: Chlidanotini
- Genus: Heppnerographa; Razowski, 1987

Species
- See text

Genus of tortrix moths

Heppnerographa is a genus of moths belonging to the family Tortricidae.

== Species ==
- Heppnerographa arammclaina Razowski, 1987
- Heppnerographa ardea Razowski & Becker, 1999
- Heppnerographa brasiliana Razowski & Becker, 1999
- Heppnerographa carchiana Razowski & Becker, 1999
- Heppnerographa chrysotona Razowski & Pelz, 2005
- Heppnerographa circinnata Razowski & Wojtusiak, 2006
- Heppnerographa ecuatorica Razowski & Becker, 1999
- Heppnerographa lapilla Razowski & Becker, 1999
- Heppnerographa longibarba Razowski & Pelz, 2005
- Heppnerographa podocarpi Razowski & Pelz, 2005
- Heppnerographa tricesimana Zeller, 1877
- Heppnerographa usitica Razowski & Pelz, 2005

== Former species ==
- Heppnerographa bathychtra Razowski & Pelz, 2005
- Heppnerographa grapholithana Razowski & Pelz, 2005
- Heppnerographa monotana Razowski & Pelz, 2005
