= Mergui (surname) =

Mergui is a surname. Notable people with the surname include:

- Joël Mergui (born 1958), French physician and Jewish official
- Jonathan Mergui (born 2000), Israeli singer, actor and dancer

== See also ==
- Myeik, Myanmar, formerly known as Mergui, a rural city in Tanintharyi Region, Myanmar
- Mergui Archipelago, an island chain off the coast of Tanintharyi Region, Myanmar
- Mergui Road, a former transit route between Myanmar and Thailand
