= Pagodas in Myeik =

Pagodas in the Myeik Archipelago, Myanmar

Pagodas in Myeik are pagodas on the Myeik Archipelago in Myanmar. Myeik (Mergui) is a city in the Tanintharyi Division in southeastern Myanmar. A pagoda is a Hindu or Buddhist temple or sacred building, typically a many-tiered tower, in India and East Asia.

== Sone Lay Sone ==
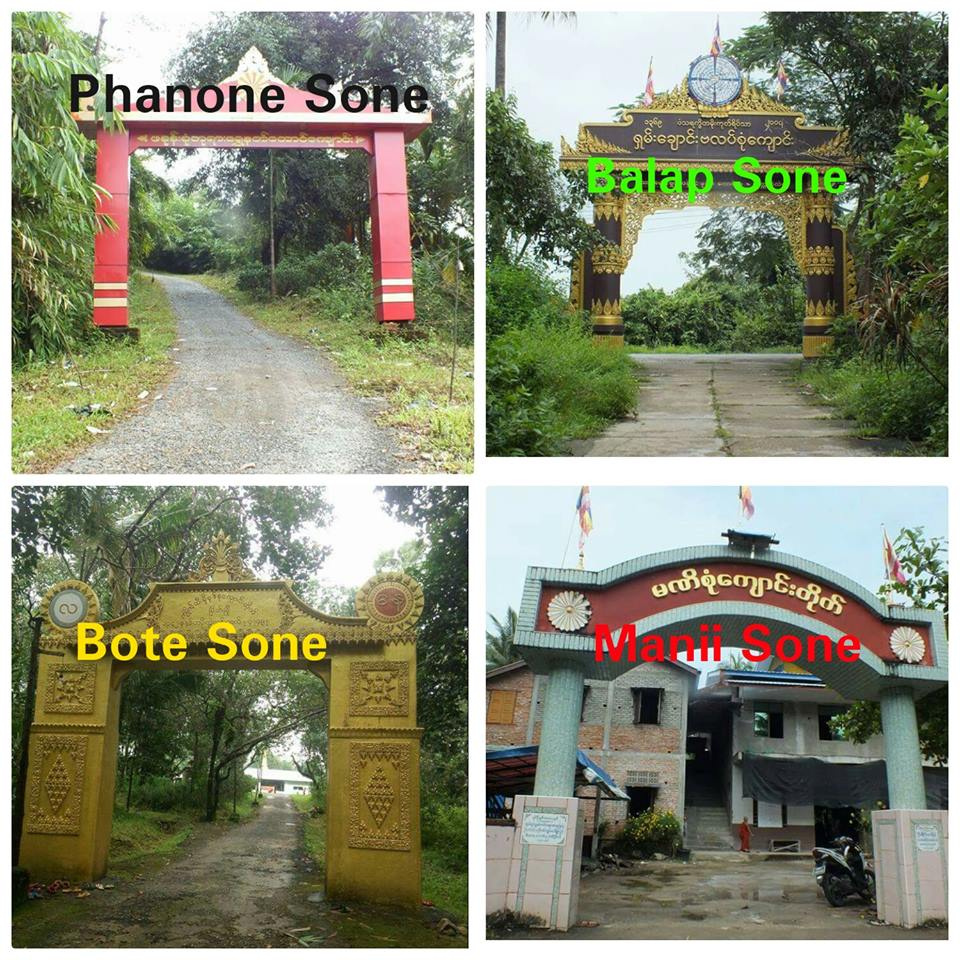
Sone Lay Sone gates

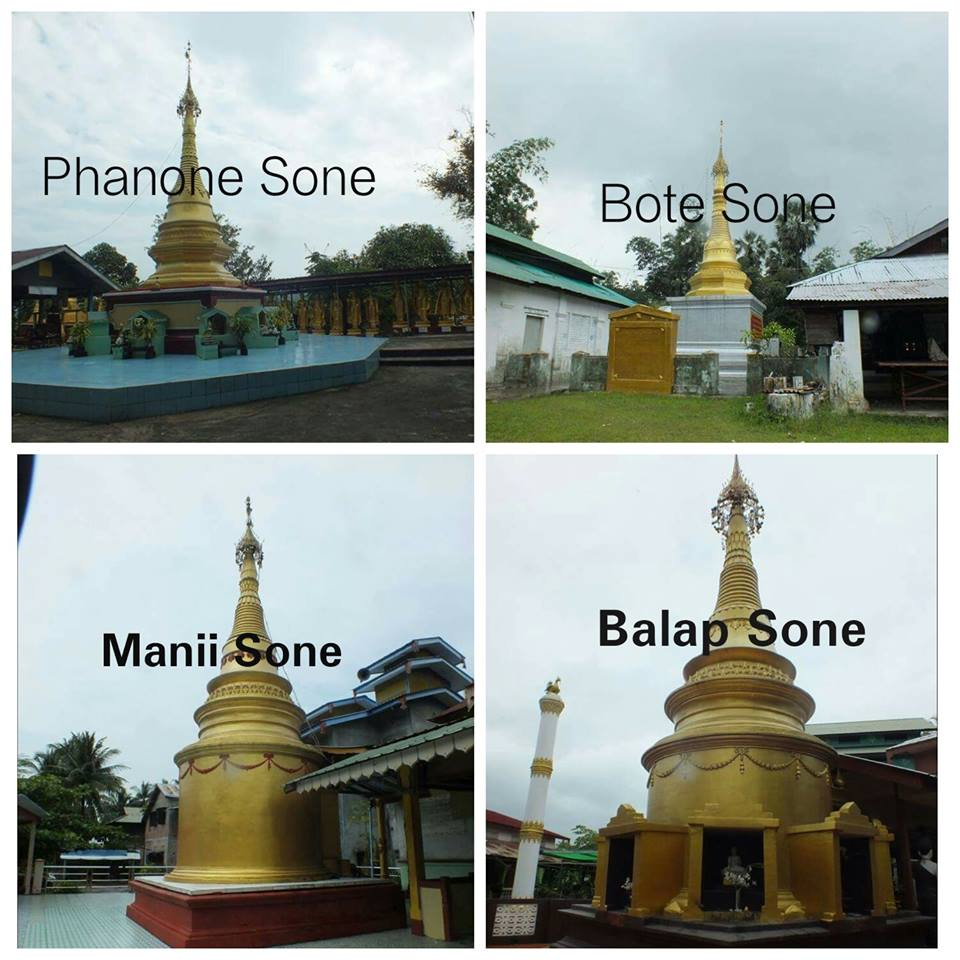
Sone Lay Sone

One abbot constructed Sone Lay Sone. He abbot meditated in those places in previous lives. In this life he used to be a monk when he was young. He looked those places after the end of colonialism in Myanmar. Abbot found those places in Myeik.

Four pagodas are present on Sone Lay Sone. It is said that if the same wish is made at all pagodas before noon, it comes true. It can take around six hours to walk between the pagodas.

== Phanone Sone ==
Constructed in 1950, it is the first to be constructed in Sone Lay Sone. Phanone is the name of a nearby mountain. In that mountain, souls are a strong enough before construct that pagoda. The pagoda became a peace place for the next life.

== Bote Sone ==
Bote Sone was constructed in 1951. It is located near the airport. The village’s name is Bote Chole.

== Balap Sone ==
Balap was constructed in 1952. The village’s name is Shan Chole.

== Manii Sone ==
Manil Sone was constructed in 1953. The village’s name is Kaloin.

== Paw Daw Mu ==
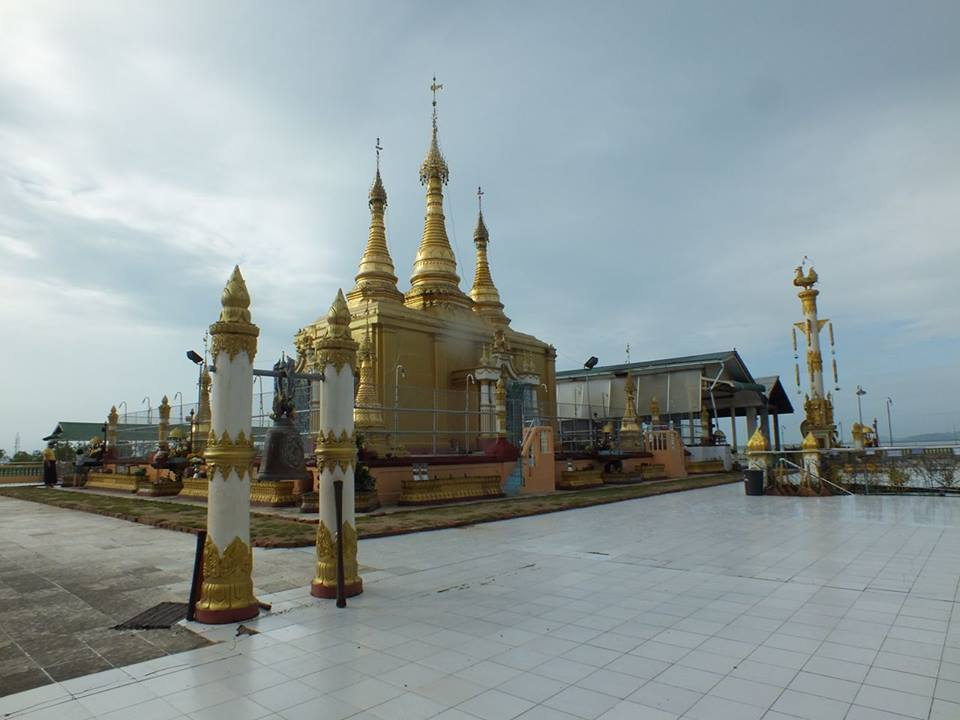
Paw Daw Mu

Paw Daw Mu is located in the golf-course. Stamping lightly on its grounds and making a wish is called “aung mal nin chin ” (to wish what you want and to make like a party for finishing Sone Lay Sone).

== Pahtaw and Pahtet ==
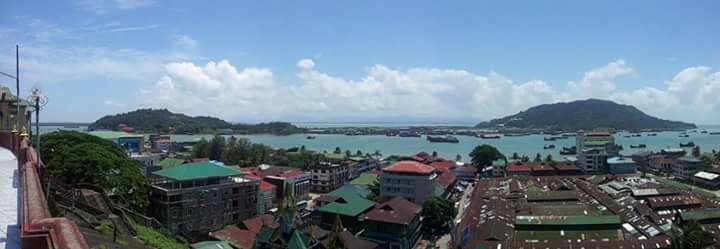
View of Pahtaw and Pahtet mountains from Thein Daw Gyi Pagoda

These two pagodas are on the same small island but different spots. They are near the downtown atop the mountain.

== Pahtaw ==
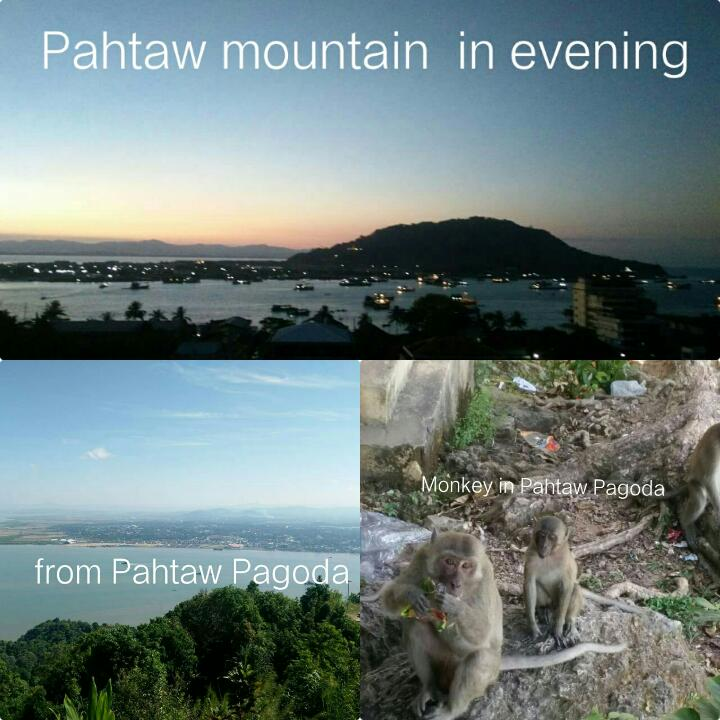
Pahtaw

Pahtaw’s mountain is high. Pahtaw is the village name. The pagoda is on the top of that village mountain. Monkeys live on top of that mountain. They try to get some food from the people and prefer bananas.

== Pahtet ==
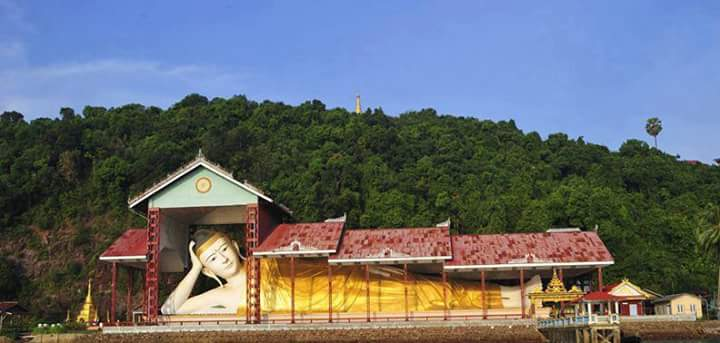
Shintarlayown

Pahtet’s mountain is lower than Pahtaw’s mountain. One large god statue and many small statues are under the mountain. The name of the big statue is Shintarlayown.
