= Hilarographa baliana =

Scientific classification
- Kingdom: Animalia
- Phylum: Arthropoda
- Clade: Pancrustacea
- Class: Insecta
- Order: Lepidoptera
- Family: Tortricidae
- Genus: Hilarographa
- Species: H. baliana

Binomial name
- Hilarographa baliana Razowski, 2009

Species of moth

Hilarographa baliana is a species of moth of the family Tortricidae. Formally described in 2009, it is named after its type locality, the island of Bali. The only known adult male specimen of this moth had a wingspan of 14 mm (0.55 in), while two female specimens had wingspans of 18 mm (0.71 in). It has an brownish-cream forewing and a dark brown hindwing. It is a Southeast Asian endemic, having been recorded from Bali in Indonesia and Myeik, Myanmar. However, specimens from the latter locality are somewhat divergent in their morphology compared to those from Bali.

== Taxonomy ==
Hilarographa baliana was formally described by the Polish entomologist Józef Razowski in 2009 based on an adult male collected from the island of Bali in Indonesia. The species is named after its type locality. It is a close relative of H. celebesiana.

== Description ==
The only known adult male specimen of this moth had a wingspan of 14 mm (0.55 in), while two female specimens had wingspans of 18 mm (0.71 in). Both the dorsal and ventral surfaces of the forewing are largely brownish-orange in color, marked by a brownish wash at the edges of the orange striae and on the speculum. The costa is rusty-orange, marked with whitish lines. The cilia of the forewing are brownish with a rust-coloured wash towards the tip. The dorsal and ventral surfaces of the hindwing are dark brown, marked by an orange median cell. The cilia of the hindwing are orange-yellow. The thorax and head are brown.

== Distribution and habitat ==
Hilarographa baliana is a Southeast Asian endemic, being known from the island of Bali in Indonesia and Myeik, Myanmar. However, specimens from the latter locality differ in their colouration and genital morphology from the type series.
