= Macrochlidia major =

Scientific classification
- Domain: Eukaryota
- Kingdom: Animalia
- Phylum: Arthropoda
- Class: Insecta
- Order: Lepidoptera
- Family: Tortricidae
- Genus: Macrochlidia
- Species: M. major

Binomial name
- Macrochlidia major Brown, 1990

Species of moth

Macrochlidia major is a species of moth of the family Tortricidae. It is found in Colombia.
