= Hilarographa tasekia =

Scientific classification
- Kingdom: Animalia
- Phylum: Arthropoda
- Class: Insecta
- Order: Lepidoptera
- Family: Tortricidae
- Genus: Hilarographa
- Species: H. tasekia

Binomial name
- Hilarographa tasekia Razowski, 2009

Species of moth

Hilarographa tasekia is a species of moth of the family Tortricidae. It is found in Malaysia.

The wingspan is about 15 mm.

== Etymology ==
The name refers to the type locality.
