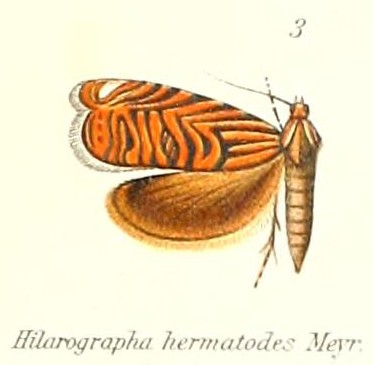
- Hilarographa hermatodes

Scientific classification
- Kingdom: Animalia
- Phylum: Arthropoda
- Clade: Pancrustacea
- Class: Insecta
- Order: Lepidoptera
- Family: Tortricidae
- Subfamily: Chlidanotinae
- Tribe: Hilarographini
- Genus: Hilarographa; Zeller, 1877

Species
- See text

= Hilarographa =

Genus of tortrix moths

Hilarographa is a genus of moths belonging to the family Tortricidae.

== Species ==
- Hilarographa ancilla Razowski, 2009
- Hilarographa aurosa Diakonoff & Arita, 1976
- Hilarographa auroscripta Razowski, 2009
- Hilarographa baliana Razowski, 2009
- Hilarographa batychtra (Razowski & Pelz, 2005)
- Hilarographa bellica Meyrick, 1912
- Hilarographa belizastrum Razowski & Wojtusiak, 2011
- Hilarographa belizeae Razowski, 2009
- Hilarographa bosavina Razowski, 2009
- Hilarographa bryonota Meyrick, 1921
- Hilarographa buruana Razowski, 2009
- Hilarographa calathisca Meyrick, 1909
- Hilarographa calyx Razowski, 2009
- Hilarographa caminodes Meyrick, 1905
- Hilarographa castanea Razowski & Wojtusiak, 2009
- Hilarographa celebesiana Razowski, 2009
- Hilarographa ceramopa Meyrick, 1920
- Hilarographa charagmotorna Razowski, 2009
- Hilarographa citharistis Meyrick, 1909
- Hilarographa cladara (Diakonoff, 1977),
- Hilarographa crocochorista (Diakonoff, 1983),
- Hilarographa cubensis (Heppner, 1983)
- Hilarographa cymatodes (Diakonoff, 1983)
- Hilarographa decoris Diakonoff & Arita, 1976
- Hilarographa dolichosticha (Diakonoff, 1977)
- Hilarographa druidica (Meyrick, 1909)
- Hilarographa dulcisana Walker, 1863
- Hilarographa eremnotorna Diakonoff & Arita, 1976
- Hilarographa eriglypta Meyrick, 1921
- Hilarographa euphronica Meyrick, 1920
- Hilarographa excellens (Pagenstecher, 1900)
- Hilarographa fergussonana Razowski, 2009
- Hilarographa ferox Meyrick, 1921
- Hilarographa gentinga Razowski, 2009
- Hilarographa grapholithana (Razowski & Pelz, 2005)
- Hilarographa gunongana Razowski, 2009
- Hilarographa hainanica Razowski, 2009
- Hilarographa hermatodes Meyrick, 1909
- Hilarographa hexapeda Meyrick, 1913
- Hilarographa iquitosana Razowski, 2009
- Hilarographa johnibradleyi Razowski, 2009
- Hilarographa jonesi Brower, 1953
- Hilarographa khaoyai Razowski, 2009
- Hilarographa leucopyrga Meyrick, 1912
- Hilarographa ludens Diakonoff, 1948
- Hilarographa macaria (Diakonoff, 1977)
- Hilarographa machaerophora Diakonoff & Arita, 1976
- Hilarographa marangana Razowski, 2009
- Hilarographa mariannae Razowski, 2009
- Hilarographa mechanica Meyrick, 1909
- Hilarographa meekana Razowski, 2009
- Hilarographa merinthias Meyrick, 1909
- Hilarographa mesostigmatias (Diakonoff, 1977)
- Hilarographa methystis Meyrick, 1921
- Hilarographa muluana Razowski, 2009
- Hilarographa obinana Razowski, 2009
- Hilarographa odontia Razowski & Wojtusiak, 2011
- Hilarographa oenobapta (Diakonoff, 1977),
- Hilarographa opistocapna (Diakonoff, 1977)
- Hilarographa orthochrysa Meyrick, 1932
- Hilarographa pahangana Razowski, 2009
- Hilarographa parambae Razowski, 2009
- Hilarographa perakana Razowski, 2009
- Hilarographa phlox (Diakonoff, 1977),
- Hilarographa plectanodes Meyrick, 1921
- Hilarographa plurimana Walker, 1863
- Hilarographa quinquestrigana Walker, 1866
- Hilarographa rampayoha Razowski, 2009
- Hilarographa refluxana Walker, 1863
- Hilarographa regalis (Walsingham, 1881)
- Hilarographa renonga Razowski, 2009
- Hilarographa ribbei Zeller, 1877
- Hilarographa robinsoni Razowski, 2009
- Hilarographa sepidmarginata Razowski & Wojtusiak, 2011
- Hilarographa shehkonga Razowski, 2009
- Hilarographa sipiroca Razowski, 2009
- Hilarographa soleana Razowski, 2009
- Hilarographa spermatodesma Diakonoff, 1955
- Hilarographa swederiana Stoll, in Cramer, 1791
- Hilarographa tasekia Razowski, 2009
- Hilarographa temburonga Razowski, 2009
- Hilarographa tetralina Meyrick, 1930
- Hilarographa thaliarcha Meyrick, 1920
- Hilarographa tornoxena (Diakonoff, 1977)
- Hilarographa uluana Razowski, 2009
- Hilarographa undosa (Diakonoff, 1977)
- Hilarographa uthaithani Razowski, 2009
- Hilarographa vinsonella Guillermet, 2013
- Hilarographa xanthotoxa Meyrick, 1920
- Hilarographa youngiella (Busck, 1922)
- Hilarographa zapyra Meyrick, 1886
