= Hilarographa johnibradleyi =

Scientific classification
- Kingdom: Animalia
- Phylum: Arthropoda
- Class: Insecta
- Order: Lepidoptera
- Family: Tortricidae
- Genus: Hilarographa
- Species: H. johnibradleyi

Binomial name
- Hilarographa johnibradleyi Razowski, 2009

Species of moth

Hilarographa johnibradleyi is a species of moth of the family Tortricidae. It is found in Thailand.

The wingspan is about 15 mm.

== Etymology ==
The species is named in honour of Dr. John D. Bradley, who collected the species.
