= Macrochlidia cajanumana =

Scientific classification
- Kingdom: Animalia
- Phylum: Arthropoda
- Class: Insecta
- Order: Lepidoptera
- Family: Tortricidae
- Genus: Macrochlidia
- Species: M. cajanumana

Binomial name
- Macrochlidia cajanumana Razowski & Pelz, 2005

Species of moth

Macrochlidia cajanumana is a species of moth of the family Tortricidae. It is found in Ecuador.
