= Hilarographa charagmotorna =

Scientific classification
- Kingdom: Animalia
- Phylum: Arthropoda
- Class: Insecta
- Order: Lepidoptera
- Family: Tortricidae
- Genus: Hilarographa
- Species: H. charagmotorna

Binomial name
- Hilarographa charagmotorna Razowski, 2009

Species of moth

Hilarographa charagmotorna is a species of moth of the family Tortricidae. It is found in Bolivia.
