= Hilarographa gentinga =

Scientific classification
- Kingdom: Animalia
- Phylum: Arthropoda
- Clade: Pancrustacea
- Class: Insecta
- Order: Lepidoptera
- Family: Tortricidae
- Genus: Hilarographa
- Species: H. gentinga

Binomial name
- Hilarographa gentinga Razowski, 2009

Species of moth

Hilarographa gentinga is a species of moth of the family Tortricidae. Formally described in 2009, it is named after its type locality, the Genting Tea Estate. The only known specimen of this moth had a wingspan of 16 mm (0.63 in). It has a brownish-cream forewing and brownish hindwing. It is a Malaysian endemic, being known only from its type locality in the western portion of Pahang state, where it was collected at an elevation of 2,000 ft (610 m) near a stream.

== Taxonomy ==
Hilarographa gentinga was formally described by the Polish entomologist Józef Razowski in 2009 based on an adult male collected from the Genting Tea Estate in Malaysia. The species is named after its type locality. It is a close relative of H. tornoxena.

== Description ==
The only known specimen of this moth, an adult male, had a wingspan of 16 mm (0.63 in). Both the dorsal and ventral surfaces of the forewing are largely brownish-cream in color, marked by straight brownish lines that stretch from the dorsum. The apex and termen are largely orange, marked with two brown dots, while the costa is brownish, marked with three whitish lines. The cilia of the forewing are brownish with an orange tip. The dorsal and ventral surfaces of the hindwing are brownish, with a lighter colouration towards the base. The cilia of the hindwing are whitish. The thorax is brown, turning a glossy blackish-brown proximally, while the head is dark brown. The labial palpus is brown with a lighter base.

== Distribution and habitat ==
Hilarographa gentinga is a Malaysian endemic, being known only from its type locality of the Genting Tea Estate in the western portion of Pahang state. It was collected at an elevation of 2,000 ft (610 m) near a stream.
