= Hilarographa rampayoha =

Scientific classification
- Kingdom: Animalia
- Phylum: Arthropoda
- Class: Insecta
- Order: Lepidoptera
- Family: Tortricidae
- Genus: Hilarographa
- Species: H. rampayoha

Binomial name
- Hilarographa rampayoha Razowski, 2009

Species of moth

Hilarographa rampayoha is a species of moth of the family Tortricidae. It is found in Brunei.

The wingspan is about 14 mm.
