= Hilarographa auroscripta =

Scientific classification
- Kingdom: Animalia
- Phylum: Arthropoda
- Clade: Pancrustacea
- Class: Insecta
- Order: Lepidoptera
- Family: Tortricidae
- Genus: Hilarographa
- Species: H. auroscripta

Binomial name
- Hilarographa auroscripta Razowski, 2009

Species of moth

Hilarographa auroscripta is a species of moth of the family Tortricidae. Formally described in 2009, its specific epithet is derived from the Latin words meaning "golden-written" and alludes to its appearance. The only known specimen of this moth had a wingspan of 12 mm (0.47 in). It has an largely orange forewing and an orange hindwing with brown margins. It is an Indonesian endemic, being known only from its type locality, the island of Ambon.

== Taxonomy ==
Hilarographa auroscripta was formally described by the Polish entomologist Józef Razowski in 2009 based on an adult female collected from Ambon Island in Indonesia. The specimen was collected in 1892 by William Doherty. The specific epithet is derived from the Latin words aureus, meaning "golden" and scripta, meaning" written", and alludes to the species' appearance. It is similar to H. excellens and H. hainanica.

== Description ==
The only known specimen of this moth, an adult female, had a wingspan of 12 mm (0.47 in). Both the dorsal and ventral surfaces of the forewing are largely orange in color. The termen is largely orange with brown margins and median spots. The dorsal and ventral surfaces of the hindwing, although damaged in the holotype, are likely orange, with brown margins and a brown band just prior to the apex. The cilia of both wings are also damaged and their colouration is unknown. The thorax and head are cream-brown, with light orange striae on the former. The labial palpus is also cream-brown, but creamier in colour than the rest of the body.

== Distribution and habitat ==
Hilarographa auroscripta is an Indonesian endemic, being known only from its type locality, the island of Ambon.
