= Hilarographa castanea =

Scientific classification
- Kingdom: Animalia
- Phylum: Arthropoda
- Class: Insecta
- Order: Lepidoptera
- Family: Tortricidae
- Genus: Hilarographa
- Species: H. castanea

Binomial name
- Hilarographa castanea Razowski & Wojtusiak, 2009

Species of moth

Hilarographa castanea is a species of moth of the family Tortricidae. It is found in the East Cordillera of Ecuador.

The wingspan is about 20 mm.

== Etymology ==
The specific name refers to the colouration of the forewing and is derived from Latin castaneus (meaning bronze).
