= Hilarographa iquitosana =

Scientific classification
- Kingdom: Animalia
- Phylum: Arthropoda
- Class: Insecta
- Order: Lepidoptera
- Family: Tortricidae
- Genus: Hilarographa
- Species: H. iquitosana

Binomial name
- Hilarographa iquitosana Razowski, 2009

Species of moth

Hilarographa iquitosana is a species of moth of the family Tortricidae. It is found in Peru.

The wingspan is about 19 mm.

== Etymology ==
The species name refers to the type locality.
