= Hilarographa buruana =

Scientific classification
- Kingdom: Animalia
- Phylum: Arthropoda
- Clade: Pancrustacea
- Class: Insecta
- Order: Lepidoptera
- Family: Tortricidae
- Genus: Hilarographa
- Species: H. buruana

Binomial name
- Hilarographa buruana Razowski, 2009

Species of moth

Hilarographa buruana is a species of moth of the family Tortricidae. Formally described in 2009, it is named after its type locality, the island of Buru in Indonesia. Specimens of this moth have a wingspan of 12 mm (0.47 in). It has an orange-brown forewing and brown hindwing. It is an Indonesian endemic, being known only from the islands of Buru, Ambon, and possibly Sanguir, where it was collected at an elevation below 1,000 ft (300 m).

== Taxonomy ==
Hilarographa buruana was formally described by the Polish entomologist Józef Razowski in 2009 based on an adult male collected from the island of Buru in Indonesia. The species is named after its type locality.

== Description ==
Specimens of this moth have a wingspan of 12 mm (0.47 in). Both the dorsal and ventral surfaces of the forewing are largely orange with a brownish wash, marked by many brownish lines. The terminal portion of the dorsal surface is marked by two black spots. The cilia of the forewing are mostly brownish, except along the tornus, where they are orange. The dorsal and ventral surfaces of the hindwing are brown. The cilia of the hindwing are brownish-cream. The thorax and head are reddish-brown.

== Distribution and habitat ==
Hilarographa buruana is an Indonesian endemic, being known from the islands of Buru and Ambon in the Maluku Islands. It may also occur on the island of Sanguir, where similar-looking females with different genital morphology have been collected. Specimens from Buru were collected at an elevation below 1,000 ft (300 m).
