= Hilarographa plectanodes =

Scientific classification
- Kingdom: Animalia
- Phylum: Arthropoda
- Class: Insecta
- Order: Lepidoptera
- Family: Tortricidae
- Genus: Hilarographa
- Species: H. plectanodes

Binomial name
- Hilarographa plectanodes Meyrick, 1921

Species of moth

Hilarographa plectanodes is a species of moth of the family Tortricidae. It is found in Peru.
