= Heppnerographa arammclaina =

Scientific classification
- Domain: Eukaryota
- Kingdom: Animalia
- Phylum: Arthropoda
- Class: Insecta
- Order: Lepidoptera
- Family: Tortricidae
- Genus: Heppnerographa
- Species: H. arammclaina

Binomial name
- Heppnerographa arammclaina Razowski, 1987

Species of moth

Heppnerographa arammclaina is a species of moth of the family Tortricidae. It is found in Costa Rica.
