= Hilarographa ancilla =

Scientific classification
- Kingdom: Animalia
- Phylum: Arthropoda
- Clade: Pancrustacea
- Class: Insecta
- Order: Lepidoptera
- Family: Tortricidae
- Genus: Hilarographa
- Species: H. ancilla

Binomial name
- Hilarographa ancilla Razowski, 2009

Species of moth

Hilarographa ancilla is a species of moth of the family Tortricidae. Formally described in 2009, its specific epithet is derived from the Latin noun ancilla, meaning servant. The only known specimen of this moth had a wingspan of 19 mm (0.75 in). It has an blackish-brown forewing with an orange-yellow apex and a dark brown hindwing. It is an Indian endemic, being known only from its type locality of Castle Rock in the state of Karnataka.

== Taxonomy ==
Hilarographa ancilla was formally described by the Polish entomologist Józef Razowski in 2009 based on an adult female collected from Castle Rock in India. Although it had been collected and determined to be a new species by Edward Meyrick in 1917, he did not validly publish a description of the species. The specific epithet is derived from the Latin noun ancilla, meaning servant. It is a close relative of H. mechanica and H. baliana.

== Description ==
The only known specimen of this moth, an adult female, had a wingspan of 19 mm (0.75 in). Both the dorsal and ventral surfaces of the forewing are orange-yellow towards the apex and blackish-brown elsewhere. The posterior and median portions have faint orange spots that form a curve. The cilia of the forewing are light brownish-black with a cream tip. The dorsal and ventral surfaces of the hindwing are dark brown, marked by a cream-orange median cell. The cilia of the hindwing are brown, marked by a brown band at the base. The thorax is brown and marked with many dusky orange striae, while the head is brown with an orange wash.

== Distribution and habitat ==
Hilarographa ancilla is an Indian endemic, being known only from its type locality of Castle Rock in erstwhile Bombay State, now located in the state of Karnataka.
