= Thaumatographa cirrhocosma =

Scientific classification
- Kingdom: Animalia
- Phylum: Arthropoda
- Clade: Pancrustacea
- Class: Insecta
- Order: Lepidoptera
- Family: Tortricidae
- Genus: Thaumatographa
- Species: T. cirrhocosma

Binomial name
- Thaumatographa cirrhocosma (Meyrick, 1930)

Synonyms
- Hilarographa cirrhocosma Meyrick, 1930

Species of moth

Thaumatographa cirrhocosma is a species of moth of the family Tortricidae. It is found on the Solomon Islands.
