= Hilarographa plurimana =

Scientific classification
- Kingdom: Animalia
- Phylum: Arthropoda
- Class: Insecta
- Order: Lepidoptera
- Family: Tortricidae
- Genus: Hilarographa
- Species: H. plurimana

Binomial name
- Hilarographa plurimana (Walker, 1863)

Synonyms
- Gauris plurimana Walker, 1863

Species of moth

Hilarographa plurimana is a species of moth of the family Tortricidae. It is found in Brazil and Peru.
