= Hilarographa calyx =

Scientific classification
- Kingdom: Animalia
- Phylum: Arthropoda
- Clade: Pancrustacea
- Class: Insecta
- Order: Lepidoptera
- Family: Tortricidae
- Genus: Hilarographa
- Species: H. calyx

Binomial name
- Hilarographa calyx Razowski, 2009

Species of moth

Hilarographa calyx is a species of moth of the family Tortricidae. Formally described in 2009, it is named after the Latin word for "cup" and alludes to "the shape of [its] anteostial sterigma". The only known specimen of this moth had a wingspan of 14 mm (0.55 in). It has a cream, brown, and rust-orange forewing and brownish hindwing. It is a Taiwanese endemic, being known only from its type locality of Kanshirei, where it was collected at an elevation of 1,000 ft (300 m) above sea level.

== Taxonomy ==
Hilarographa calyx was formally described by the Polish entomologist Józef Razowski in 2009 based on an adult female collected from Kanshirei in Taiwan. The specific epithet is derived from the Latin word calyx, meaning "cup", and alludes to "the shape of [its] anteostial sterigma". It is a close relative of H. mesostigmatias.

== Description ==
The only known specimen of this moth, an adult female, had a wingspan of 14 mm (0.55 in). Both the dorsal and ventral surfaces of the forewing have a cream base colour, marked by many brownish lines. The fourth of the forewing closest to the tip is rusty-orange, while the apex is brown. The cilia of the forewing are cream-coloured. The dorsal and ventral surfaces of the hindwing are brown, with a strong cream wash in the proximal portion of the median cell. The colour of the cilia of the hindwing is unknown. The thorax and head are cream-brown. The labial palpus is a lighter color than the rest of the body.

== Distribution and habitat ==
Hilarographa calyx is a Taiwanese endemic, being known only from its type locality of Kanshirei. It was collected at an elevation of 1,000 ft (300 m) above sea level.
