= Hilarographa shehkonga =

Scientific classification
- Kingdom: Animalia
- Phylum: Arthropoda
- Class: Insecta
- Order: Lepidoptera
- Family: Tortricidae
- Genus: Hilarographa
- Species: H. shehkonga

Binomial name
- Hilarographa shehkonga Razowski, 2009

Species of moth

Hilarographa shehkonga is a species of moth of the family Tortricidae. It is found in Hong Kong, China.

The wingspan is about 10 mm.
