= Hilarographa pahangana =

Scientific classification
- Kingdom: Animalia
- Phylum: Arthropoda
- Class: Insecta
- Order: Lepidoptera
- Family: Tortricidae
- Genus: Hilarographa
- Species: H. pahangana

Binomial name
- Hilarographa pahangana Razowski, 2009

Species of moth

Hilarographa pahangana is a species of moth of the family Tortricidae. It is found in Malaysia.

The wingspan is about 20 mm.

== Etymology ==
The species name refers to the type locality, West Pahang.
