= Hilarographa druidica =

Scientific classification
- Kingdom: Animalia
- Phylum: Arthropoda
- Class: Insecta
- Order: Lepidoptera
- Family: Tortricidae
- Genus: Hilarographa
- Species: H. druidica

Binomial name
- Hilarographa druidica (Meyrick, 1909)

Synonyms
- Idiothauma druidica Meyrick, 1909

Species of moth

Hilarographa druidica is a species of moth of the family Tortricidae. It is found in India (Bombay).
