= Hilarographa obinana =

Scientific classification
- Kingdom: Animalia
- Phylum: Arthropoda
- Class: Insecta
- Order: Lepidoptera
- Family: Tortricidae
- Genus: Hilarographa
- Species: H. obinana

Binomial name
- Hilarographa obinana Razowski, 2009

Species of insect

Hilarographa obinana is a species of moth of the family Tortricidae. It is found on Obi Major Island in the Moluccas, within Indonesia.

The wingspan is about 11 mm.
