= Hilarographa orthochrysa =

Scientific classification
- Kingdom: Animalia
- Phylum: Arthropoda
- Class: Insecta
- Order: Lepidoptera
- Family: Tortricidae
- Genus: Hilarographa
- Species: H. orthochrysa

Binomial name
- Hilarographa orthochrysa Meyrick, 1932

Species of moth

Hilarographa orthochrysa is a species of moth of the family Tortricidae. It is found in Brazil.
