= Hilarographa robinsoni =

Scientific classification
- Kingdom: Animalia
- Phylum: Arthropoda
- Clade: Pancrustacea
- Class: Insecta
- Order: Lepidoptera
- Family: Tortricidae
- Genus: Hilarographa
- Species: H. robinsoni

Binomial name
- Hilarographa robinsoni Razowski, 2009

Species of moth

Hilarographa robinsoni is a species of moth of the family Tortricidae. Formally described in 2009, it is named after the collector of its type specimens, the British entomologist Gaden S. Robinson. The only known specimen of this moth had a wingspan of 19 mm (0.75 in). It has an orange-cream forewing and brownish hindwing. It is a Bornean endemic, being known only from its type locality of Rampayoh in the country of Brunei, where it was collected at an elevation of around 400 ft (120 m) above sea level in a lowland forest.

== Taxonomy ==
Hilarographa robinsoni was formally described by the Polish entomologist Józef Razowski in 2009 based on an adult female collected from Rampayoh in Brunei. The species is named after Gaden S. Robinson, a British entomologist who collected the type specimens of this species in 1982.

== Description ==
The only known specimen of this moth, an adult female, had a wingspan of 19 mm (0.75 in). Both the dorsal and ventral surfaces of the forewing are largely orange-cream in color, marked by grey and brown lines. The area towards the base has a dark brown color and is marked by ochre striae postmedially and reddish striae subcostally. The apex is orange-cream with brown margins, while the termen is a light orange-cream marked by brown spots and striae. The cilia of the forewing are cream-brown with a brown dorsal surface. The dorsal and ventral surfaces of the hindwing are brown, with a cream wash towards the base and medially. The cilia of the hindwing are cream, marked by a brown line at the base. The thorax is brownish, turning a darker brown towards the head and marked by yellowish-orange lines submedially and at the tegula. The head itself is light orange with a dark brown vertex. The broad labial palpus is orange with a dark brown tip.

== Distribution and habitat ==
Hilarographa robinsoni is a Bornean endemic, being known only from its type locality of Rampayoh in the country of Brunei. It was collected at an elevation of 400 ft (120 m) in a lowland forest.
