= Hilarographa belizastrum =

Scientific classification
- Kingdom: Animalia
- Phylum: Arthropoda
- Class: Insecta
- Order: Lepidoptera
- Family: Tortricidae
- Genus: Hilarographa
- Species: H. belizastrum

Binomial name
- Hilarographa belizastrum Razowski & Wojtusiak, 2011

Species of moth

Hilarographa belizastrum is a species of moth of the family Tortricidae. It is found in the Cordillera Occidental of Colombia.

The wingspan is about 21 mm.
