= Thaumatographa pampoecila =

Scientific classification
- Kingdom: Animalia
- Phylum: Arthropoda
- Clade: Pancrustacea
- Class: Insecta
- Order: Lepidoptera
- Family: Tortricidae
- Genus: Thaumatographa
- Species: T. pampoecila

Binomial name
- Thaumatographa pampoecila (Turner, 1913)

Synonyms
- Brenthia pampoecila Turner, 1913

Species of moth

Thaumatographa pampoecila is a species of moth of the family Tortricidae. It is found in Queensland, Australia.
