= Hilarographa hainanica =

Scientific classification
- Kingdom: Animalia
- Phylum: Arthropoda
- Class: Insecta
- Order: Lepidoptera
- Family: Tortricidae
- Genus: Hilarographa
- Species: H. hainanica

Binomial name
- Hilarographa hainanica Razowski, 2009

Species of moth

Hilarographa hainanica is a species of moth of the family Tortricidae. It is found in Hainan, China.

The wingspan is about 12 mm.

== Etymology ==
The specific name refers to the type location, the island of Hainan.
