= Hilarographa celebesiana =

Scientific classification
- Kingdom: Animalia
- Phylum: Arthropoda
- Class: Insecta
- Order: Lepidoptera
- Family: Tortricidae
- Genus: Hilarographa
- Species: H. celebesiana

Binomial name
- Hilarographa celebesiana Razowski, 2009

Species of moth

Hilarographa celebesiana is a species of moth of the family Tortricidae. It is found on Sulawesi.

The wingspan is about 16 mm.

== Etymology ==
The species is named after its native island, Celebes, now named Sulawesi.
