= Hilarographa swederiana =

Scientific classification
- Kingdom: Animalia
- Phylum: Arthropoda
- Class: Insecta
- Order: Lepidoptera
- Family: Tortricidae
- Genus: Hilarographa
- Species: H. swederiana

Binomial name
- Hilarographa swederiana (Stoll, in Cramer, 1791)

Synonyms
- Phalaena (Tortrix) swederiana Stoll, in Cramer, 1791; Grapholitha trabaena Felder & Rogenhofer, 1875

Species of moth

Hilarographa swederiana is a species of moth of the family Tortricidae. It is found in Suriname and Brazil.
