= Hilarographa sepidmarginata =

Scientific classification
- Kingdom: Animalia
- Phylum: Arthropoda
- Class: Insecta
- Order: Lepidoptera
- Family: Tortricidae
- Genus: Hilarographa
- Species: H. sepidmarginata

Binomial name
- Hilarographa sepidmarginata Razowski & Wojtusiak, 2011

Species of moth

Hilarographa sepidmarginata is a species of moth of the family Tortricidae. It is found in the Cordillera Occidental of Colombia.

The wingspan is about 29 mm.

== Etymology ==
The specific name refers to the colouration of the hindwing and is derived from Latin sepia (meaning black paint) and marginata (meaning bordered).
