= Heppnerographa ecuatorica =

Scientific classification
- Kingdom: Animalia
- Phylum: Arthropoda
- Clade: Pancrustacea
- Class: Insecta
- Order: Lepidoptera
- Family: Tortricidae
- Genus: Heppnerographa
- Species: H. ecuatorica

Binomial name
- Heppnerographa ecuatorica Razowski & Becker, 1999

Species of moth

Heppnerographa ecuatorica is a species of moth of the family Tortricidae. It is found in Ecuador.

The wingspan is about 12.5 mm.
