= Hilarographa fergussonana =

Scientific classification
- Kingdom: Animalia
- Phylum: Arthropoda
- Class: Insecta
- Order: Lepidoptera
- Family: Tortricidae
- Genus: Hilarographa
- Species: H. fergussonana

Binomial name
- Hilarographa fergussonana Razowski, 2009

Species of moth

Hilarographa fergussonana is a species of moth of the family Tortricidae. It is found on Fergusson Island in Papua New Guinea.

The wingspan is about 13 mm.

== Etymology ==
The name refers to Fergusson Island.
