= Macrochlidia =

Scientific classification
- Domain: Eukaryota
- Kingdom: Animalia
- Phylum: Arthropoda
- Class: Insecta
- Order: Lepidoptera
- Family: Tortricidae
- Tribe: Chlidanotini
- Genus: Macrochlidia; Brown, 1991

Species
- See text

Synonyms
- Macrochlidia J.W.Brown, 1990 (nomen nudum)

Genus of tortrix moths

Macrochlidia is a genus of moths belonging to the family Tortricidae.

== Species ==
- Macrochlidia azuayana Razowski & Pelz, 2007
- Macrochlidia cajanumana Razowski & Pelz, 2005
- Macrochlidia leucoatra Razowski & Pelz, 2007
- Macrochlidia major Brown, 1990
- Macrochlidia minor Brown, 1990
- Macrochlidia monotona (Razowski & Pelz, 2005)
