= Singkhon Pass =

Pass between the Tenasserim Hills, Thailand-Myanmar

Singkhon Pass ด่านสิงขร
- Maw Daung
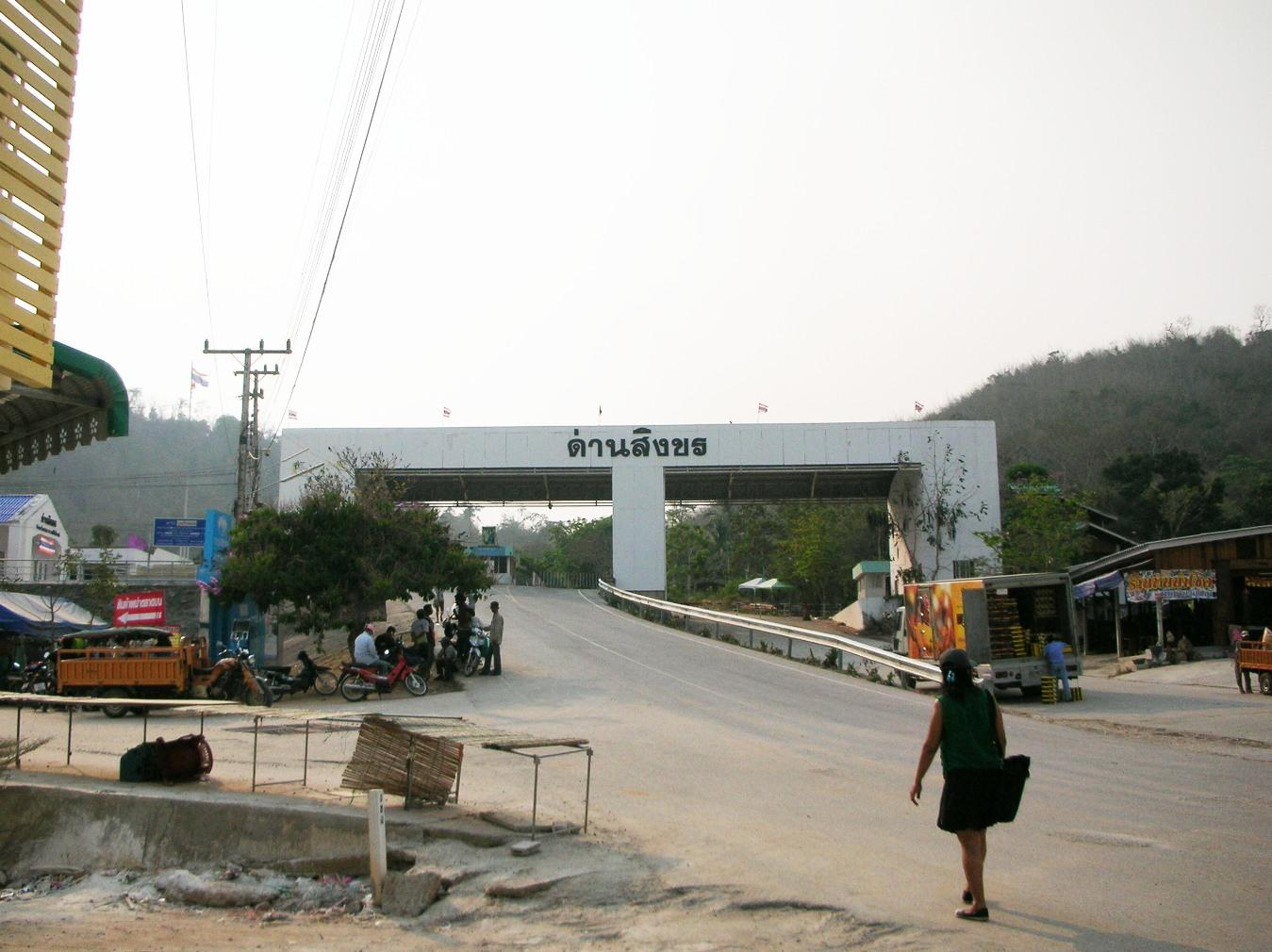
- Border checkpoint, Singkhon Pass

- Location within Thailand
- Elevation: 245 m (804 ft)

Location
- Location: Myanmar–Thailand border
- Range: Tenasserim Hills
- Coordinates: 11°47′22″N 99°38′27″E

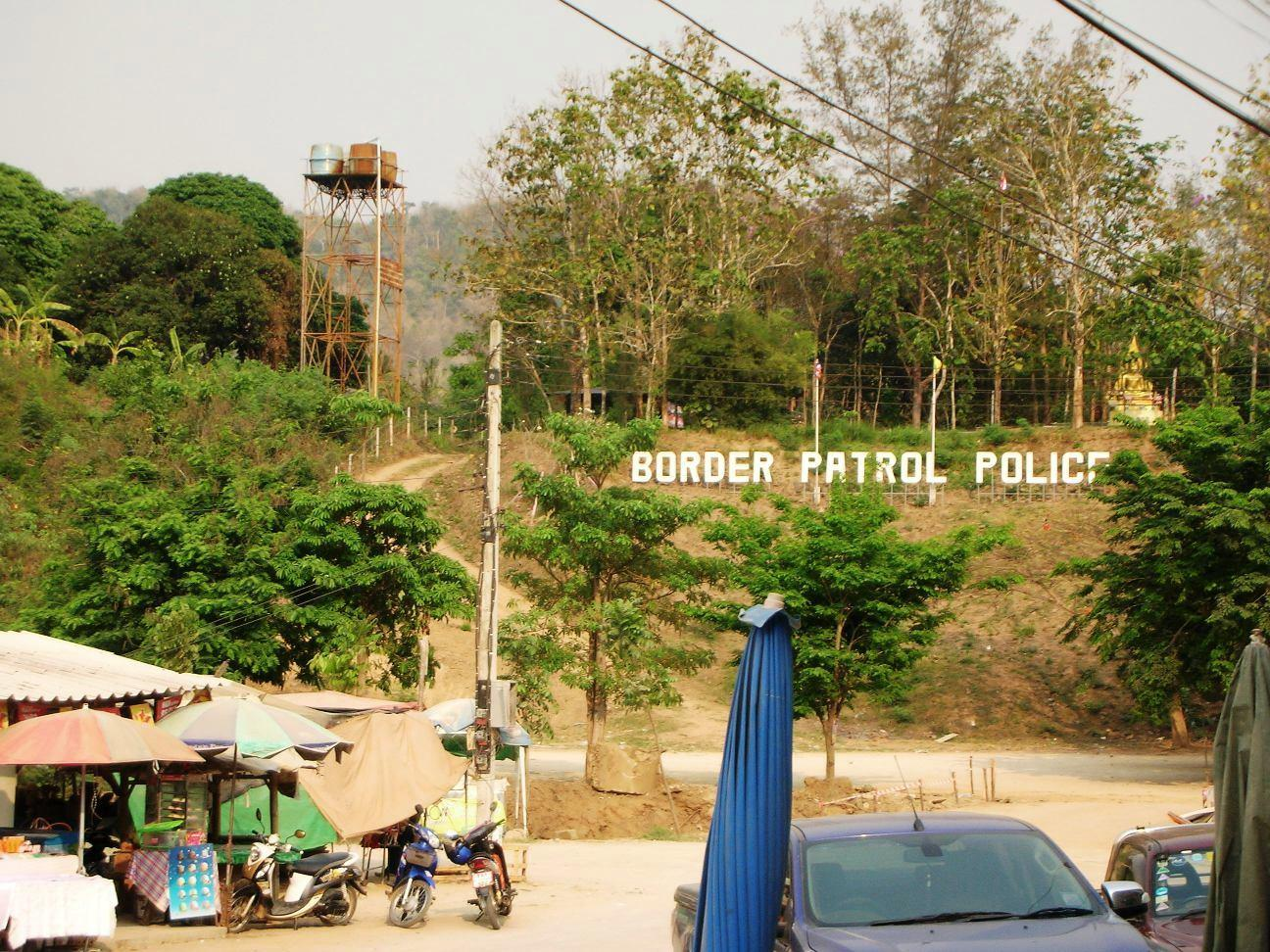
Singkhon Pass Myanmar-Thailand border post. Border Patrol Police office.

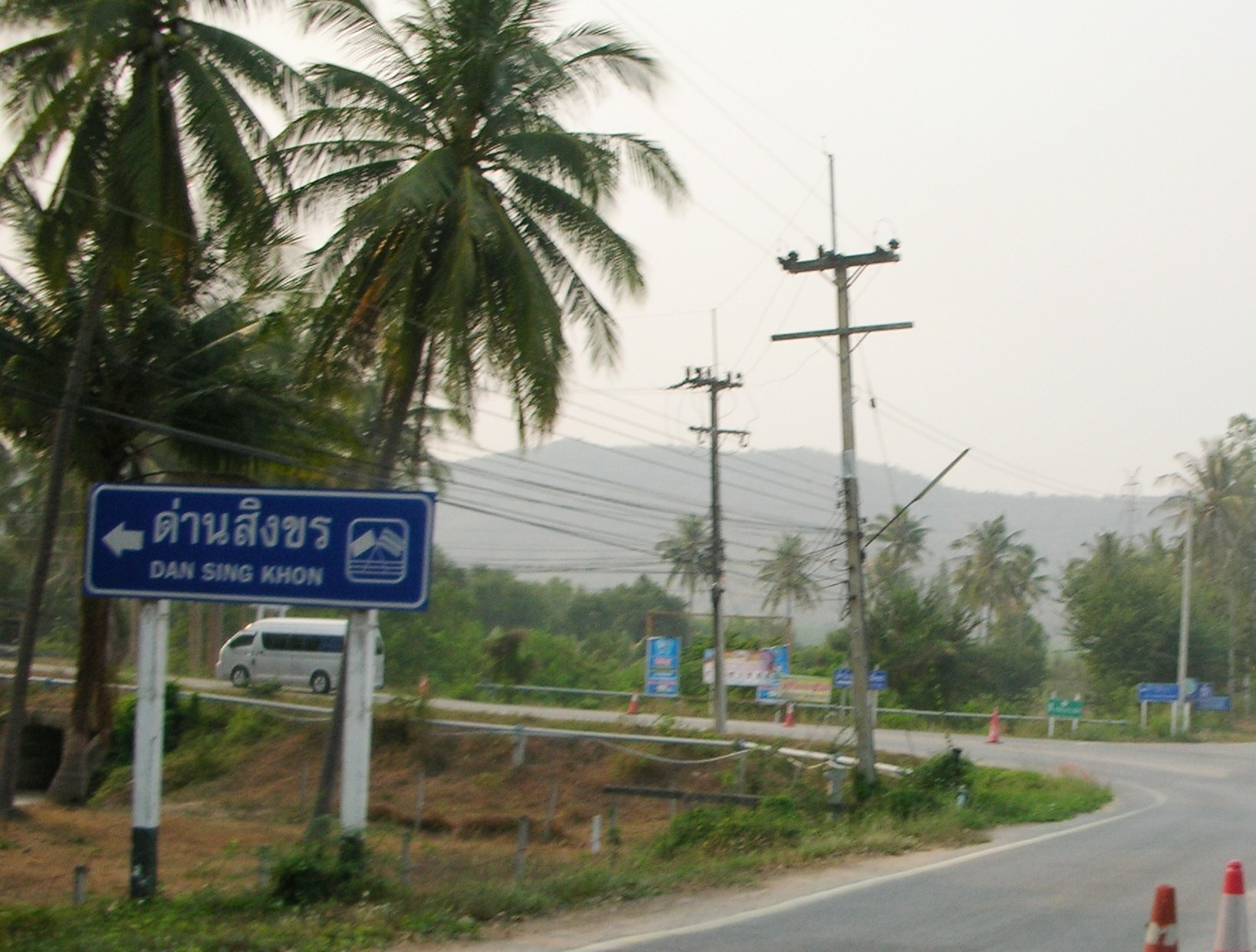
Road sign on Thailand Road 1039 near Singkhon Pass

Singkhon Pass (Thai: ด่านสิงขร), also referred to as Sing Khon and as Maw Daung after the name of the Burmese town west of the border, is a pass across the Tenasserim Hills on the border between Thailand and Myanmar, at an elevation of 245 metres (804 ft). The pass is close to the narrowest point of Thailand in Khlong Wan (คลองวาฬ) subdistrict, Mueang Prachuap Khiri Khan District, Prachuap Khiri Khan Province.

== History ==
Singkhon pass was important during the wars between Siam and the Burmese, and also during World War II, when the Mergui Road was constructed by the Japanese invaders. The pass, on Thai Hwy 1039, about 14 km (8.7 mi) to the west of its junction with Thailand Route 41, was formerly closed, but was informally opened since May 2013 as a result of bilateral agreements.

The road on the Burmese side leads to Myeik – via Mawdaung and Tanintharyi – and has recently been repaired. Singkhon Pass has been upgraded since late-2014 with improved public utilities, urban planning, and landscaping.

The official inauguration ceremony of the border crossing took place on 23 May 2015 with a crowd of about 2000 from both sides of the border attending the event.

== Tourism ==
The Singkhon Pass border checkpoint is currently also being developed as a tourist attraction with new shops opening in the area by the road on the Thai side. It is also a place whereby traffic from one side of the road must change over to drive on the opposite side of the road.

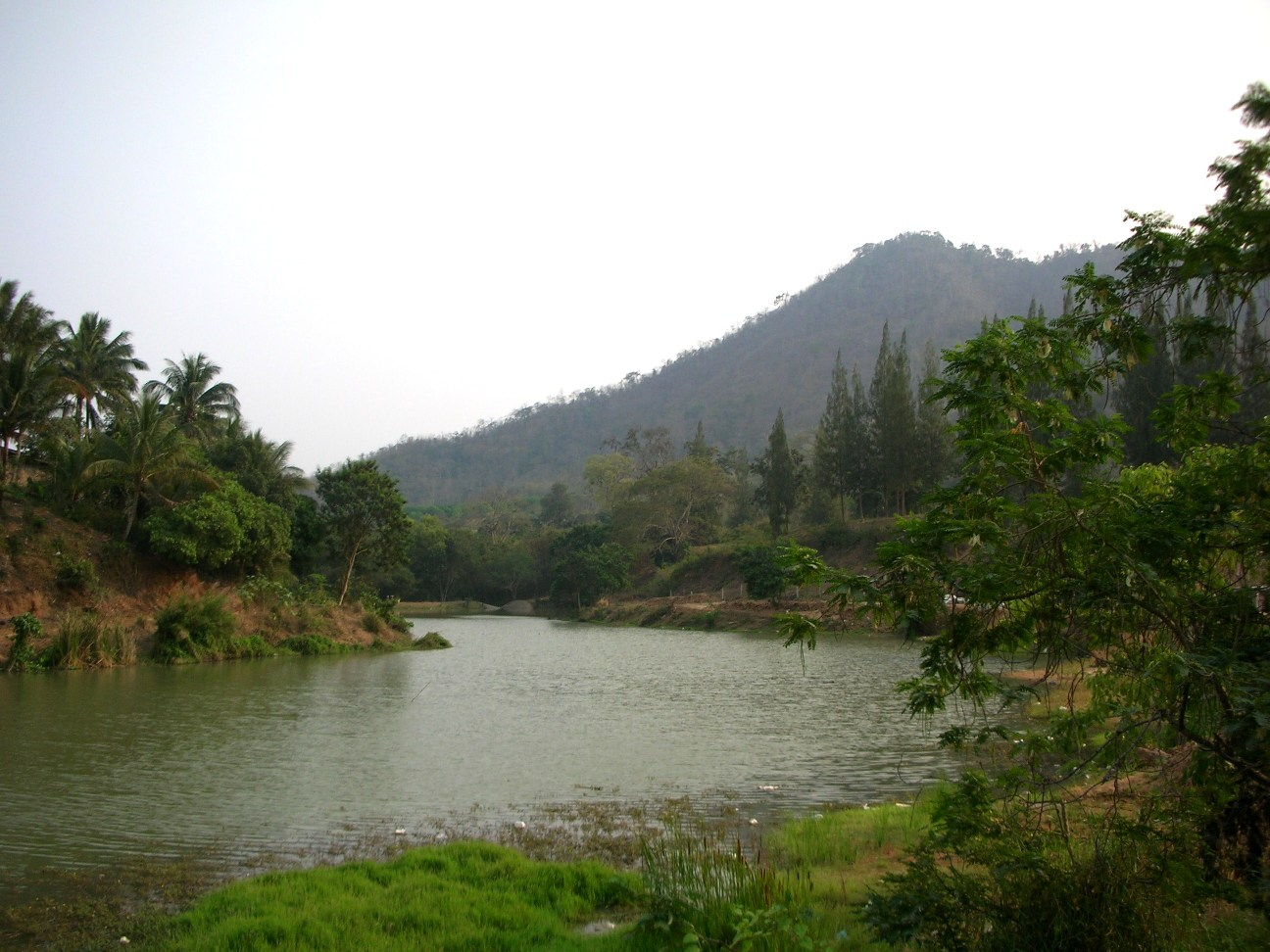
Lake by Singkhon Pass border post.

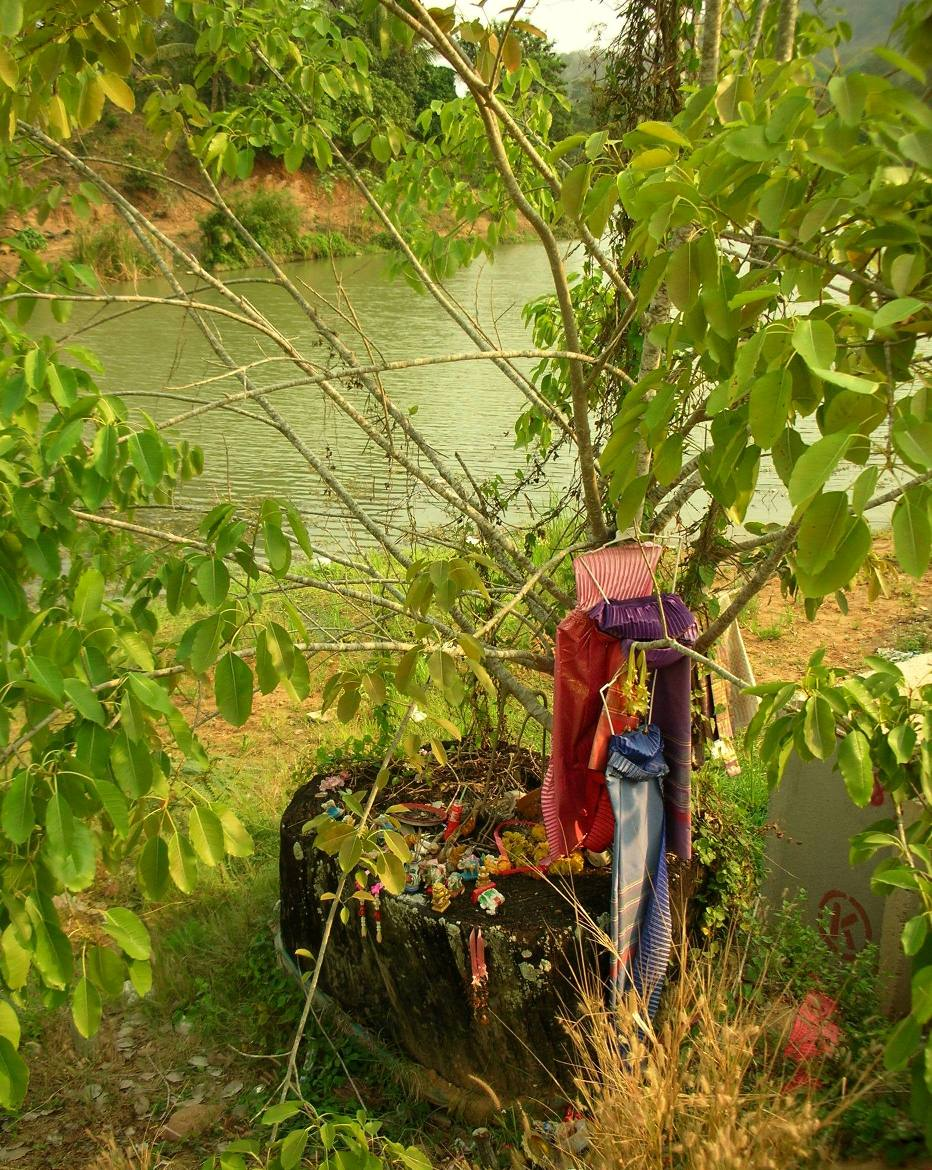
Stump of a Hopea odorata tree (ตะเคียน) with offerings to Nang Ta-khian near the shrine close to the lake.
