= Hilarographa methystis =

Scientific classification
- Kingdom: Animalia
- Phylum: Arthropoda
- Class: Insecta
- Order: Lepidoptera
- Family: Tortricidae
- Genus: Hilarographa
- Species: H. methystis

Binomial name
- Hilarographa methystis Meyrick, 1921

Species of moth

Hilarographa methystis is a species of moth of the family Tortricidae. It is found in Peru.
