= Hilarographa belizeae =

Scientific classification
- Kingdom: Animalia
- Phylum: Arthropoda
- Class: Insecta
- Order: Lepidoptera
- Family: Tortricidae
- Genus: Hilarographa
- Species: H. belizeae

Binomial name
- Hilarographa belizeae Razowski, 2009

Species of moth

Hilarographa belizeae is a species of moth of the family Tortricidae. It is found in Belize.

The wingspan is about 16.5 mm.
