= Hilarographa gunongana =

Scientific classification
- Kingdom: Animalia
- Phylum: Arthropoda
- Class: Insecta
- Order: Lepidoptera
- Family: Tortricidae
- Genus: Hilarographa
- Species: H. gunongana

Binomial name
- Hilarographa gunongana Razowski, 2009

Species of moth

Hilarographa gunongana is a species of moth of the family Tortricidae. It is found in Sarawak.

The wingspan is about 8.5 mm.

== Etymology ==
The name refers to the type locality.
