= Heppnerographa tricesimana =

Scientific classification
- Kingdom: Animalia
- Phylum: Arthropoda
- Clade: Pancrustacea
- Class: Insecta
- Order: Lepidoptera
- Family: Tortricidae
- Genus: Heppnerographa
- Species: H. tricesimana

Binomial name
- Heppnerographa tricesimana (Zeller, 1877)

Synonyms
- Conchylis tricesimana Zeller, 1877

Species of moth

Heppnerographa tricesimana is a species of moth of the family Tortricidae. It is found in Costa Rica, Panama, Guatemala, Ecuador, Brazil, Jamaica and Puerto Rico.

Adults are variable in size with a wingspan of 18–23 mm.
