= Hilarographa euphronica =

Scientific classification
- Kingdom: Animalia
- Phylum: Arthropoda
- Class: Insecta
- Order: Lepidoptera
- Family: Tortricidae
- Genus: Hilarographa
- Species: H. euphronica

Binomial name
- Hilarographa euphronica Meyrick, 1920

Species of moth

Hilarographa euphronica is a species of moth of the family Tortricidae. It is found in Brazil.
