= Hilarographa khaoyai =

Scientific classification
- Kingdom: Animalia
- Phylum: Arthropoda
- Class: Insecta
- Order: Lepidoptera
- Family: Tortricidae
- Genus: Hilarographa
- Species: H. khaoyai

Binomial name
- Hilarographa khaoyai Razowski, 2009

Species of moth

Hilarographa khaoyai is a species of moth of the family Tortricidae. It is found in Thailand.

The wingspan is about 8 mm. The ground colour of the forewings is greyish suffused and diffusely strigulated (finely streaked) grey-brown. The hindwings are brownish.

== Etymology ==
The name refers to the type locality.
