= Hilarographa dulcisana =

Scientific classification
- Kingdom: Animalia
- Phylum: Arthropoda
- Class: Insecta
- Order: Lepidoptera
- Family: Tortricidae
- Genus: Hilarographa
- Species: H. dulcisana

Binomial name
- Hilarographa dulcisana (Walker, 1863)

Synonyms
- Gauris dulcisana Walker, 1863; Hilarographa dulciana Meyrick, in Wagner, 1913

Species of moth

Hilarographa dulcisana is a species of moth of the family Tortricidae. It is found in Brazil.
