= Hilarographa soleana =

Scientific classification
- Kingdom: Animalia
- Phylum: Arthropoda
- Class: Insecta
- Order: Lepidoptera
- Family: Tortricidae
- Genus: Hilarographa
- Species: H. soleana

Binomial name
- Hilarographa soleana Razowski, 2009

Species of insect

Hilarographa soleana is a species of moth of the family Tortricidae. It is found on Seram in Indonesia.

The wingspan is about 17.5 mm.
