= International Language & Business Centre =

ILBC School

Location
- Yangon, Myanmar
- Coordinates: 16°49′12″N 96°10′31″E

International Language & Business Centre (ILBC) is a private school established on May 2, 1995, in the Republic of the Union of Myanmar. It has established 26 schools in eight major cities of the country: Yangon, Mandalay, Naypyidaw, Myitkyina, Taunggyi, Monywa, Lashio, Taungoo, and Myeik .

== History ==
ILBC was established on May 2, 1995, with a small language class of twenty students. Since then, it has gained the trust and support of the populace, and has now become the leading institution among private education sector in Myanmar. Today, the company has established 26 campuses in 8 major cities of the country, providing education and language training to over 10,000 students.

The Board of Education, consisting of the Managing Director & Founder, the Superintendent, the Principal, Division heads and Department heads, is the governing body of ILBC. Currently 1540 teachers (including assistant and trainee teachers) and 972 support staff are working under the guidance of the Board of Education.

There are two semesters in one academic year, normally commencing in the first week of June and ending in March with your grade's respective examinations. For students who are unable to attend the regular week-day school, ILBC offers weekend IGCSE-oriented courses and English Proficiency Course (EPC).

The Lashio School

The school branch of Lashio was closed on March 7, 2024 because of the ongoing war of Operation 1027 and the Battle of Lashio. It was expected to open back in the next 6 or 7 months.

The Myitkyina school was closed due to floods, Wi-Fi problems, and the war between the Kachin Independence Army and the Myanmar Army. The allies were getting nearer.
