= Paw Taw Mu Pagoda =

Buddhist pagoda in Myeik, Myanmar

Paw Daw Mu Pagoda
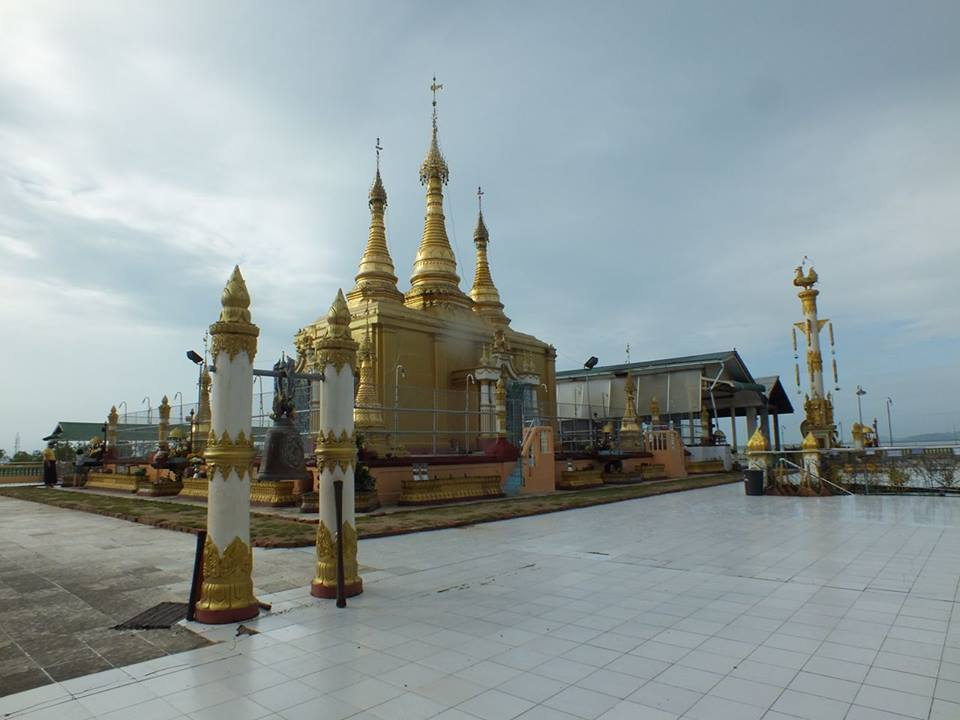
- Paw Daw Mu Pagoda

Religion
- Affiliation: Theravada Buddhism

Location
- Country: Myeik, Tanintharyi Region, Myanmar
- Interactive map of Paw Daw Mu Pagoda
- Coordinates: 12°27′53″N 98°37′14″E

Architecture
- Completed: 6th century BC

Paw Daw Mu Pagoda (Burmese: ပေါ်တော်မူစေတီတော်) is a Buddhist pagoda in Myeik, Tanintharyi Region, Myanmar. It is the largest pagoda in Myeik, and a popular tourist attraction. The original stupa was said to have been built in the 6th century BC during the time of Buddha and contains his relics.

King Alaungpaya stumbled upon the ruins of the pagoda in the forest and reformed it. There have been many restorations of it since then. Stamping lightly on its grounds and making a wish is called "aung myay nin chin".
