= Hilarographa hexapeda =

Scientific classification
- Kingdom: Animalia
- Phylum: Arthropoda
- Class: Insecta
- Order: Lepidoptera
- Family: Tortricidae
- Genus: Hilarographa
- Species: H. hexapeda

Binomial name
- Hilarographa hexapeda Meyrick, 1913

Species of moth

Hilarographa hexapeda is a species of moth of the family Tortricidae. It is found in Guyana.
