= Hilarographa quinquestrigana =

Scientific classification
- Kingdom: Animalia
- Phylum: Arthropoda
- Class: Insecta
- Order: Lepidoptera
- Family: Tortricidae
- Genus: Hilarographa
- Species: H. quinquestrigana

Binomial name
- Hilarographa quinquestrigana (Walker, 1866)

Synonyms
- Carpocapsa quinquestrigana Walker, 1866; Carpocapsa firmana Felder & Rogenhofer, 1875

Species of moth

Hilarographa quinquestrigana is a species of moth of the family Tortricidae. It is found in Brazil.
