= Hilarographa meekana =

Scientific classification
- Kingdom: Animalia
- Phylum: Arthropoda
- Class: Insecta
- Order: Lepidoptera
- Family: Tortricidae
- Genus: Hilarographa
- Species: H. meekana

Binomial name
- Hilarographa meekana Razowski, 2009

Species of moth

Hilarographa meekana is a species of moth of the family Tortricidae. It is found on Fergusson Island in Papua New Guinea.

The wingspan is about 18.5 mm (0.73 in).
