= Hilarographa marangana =

Scientific classification
- Kingdom: Animalia
- Phylum: Arthropoda
- Class: Insecta
- Order: Lepidoptera
- Family: Tortricidae
- Genus: Hilarographa
- Species: H. marangana

Binomial name
- Hilarographa marangana Razowski, 2009

Species of moth

Hilarographa marangana is a species of moth of the family Tortricidae. It is found on Sumatra.

The wingspan is about 15 mm.
