= Heppnerographa longibarba =

Scientific classification
- Kingdom: Animalia
- Phylum: Arthropoda
- Class: Insecta
- Order: Lepidoptera
- Family: Tortricidae
- Genus: Heppnerographa
- Species: H. longibarba

Binomial name
- Heppnerographa longibarba Razowski & Pelz, 2005

Species of moth

Heppnerographa longibarba is a species of moth of the family Tortricidae. It is found in Ecuador.
