= Hilarographa ribbei =

Scientific classification
- Kingdom: Animalia
- Phylum: Arthropoda
- Clade: Pancrustacea
- Class: Insecta
- Order: Lepidoptera
- Family: Tortricidae
- Genus: Hilarographa
- Species: H. ribbei

Binomial name
- Hilarographa ribbei (Zeller, 1877)

Synonyms
- Setiostoma ribbei Zeller, 1877

Species of insect

Hilarographa ribbei is a species of moth of the family Tortricidae. It is found in Panama.
