= Hilarographa xanthotoxa =

Scientific classification
- Kingdom: Animalia
- Phylum: Arthropoda
- Class: Insecta
- Order: Lepidoptera
- Family: Tortricidae
- Genus: Hilarographa
- Species: H. xanthotoxa

Binomial name
- Hilarographa xanthotoxa Meyrick, 1920

Species of moth

Hilarographa xanthotoxa is a species of moth of the family Tortricidae. It is found in Brazil and Bolivia.
