= Heppnerographa circinnata =

Scientific classification
- Domain: Eukaryota
- Kingdom: Animalia
- Phylum: Arthropoda
- Class: Insecta
- Order: Lepidoptera
- Family: Tortricidae
- Genus: Heppnerographa
- Species: H. circinnata

Binomial name
- Heppnerographa circinnata Razowski & Wojtusiak, 2006

Species of moth

Heppnerographa circinnata is a species of moth of the family Tortricidae which is endemic to Venezuela.

The wingspan is about 19 millimetres (0.75 in).
