= Hilarographa vinsonella =

Scientific classification
- Kingdom: Animalia
- Phylum: Arthropoda
- Class: Insecta
- Order: Lepidoptera
- Family: Tortricidae
- Genus: Hilarographa
- Species: H. vinsonella

Binomial name
- Hilarographa vinsonella Guillermet, 2013

Species of moth

Hilarographa vinsonella is a species of moth of the family Tortricidae. It is found on Réunion in the Indian Ocean.
