= Hilarographa sipiroca =

Scientific classification
- Kingdom: Animalia
- Phylum: Arthropoda
- Class: Insecta
- Order: Lepidoptera
- Family: Tortricidae
- Genus: Hilarographa
- Species: H. sipiroca

Binomial name
- Hilarographa sipiroca Razowski, 2009

Species of insect

Hilarographa sipiroca is a species of moth of the family Tortricidae. It is found on Sumatra in western Indonesia.

The wingspan is about 27 mm.
