= Hilarographa bellica =

Scientific classification
- Kingdom: Animalia
- Phylum: Arthropoda
- Class: Insecta
- Order: Lepidoptera
- Family: Tortricidae
- Genus: Hilarographa
- Species: H. bellica

Binomial name
- Hilarographa bellica Meyrick, 1912

Species of moth

Hilarographa bellica is a species of moth of the family Tortricidae. It is found in Suriname.
