= Hilarographa bosavina =

Scientific classification
- Kingdom: Animalia
- Phylum: Arthropoda
- Clade: Pancrustacea
- Class: Insecta
- Order: Lepidoptera
- Family: Tortricidae
- Genus: Hilarographa
- Species: H. bosavina

Binomial name
- Hilarographa bosavina Razowski, 2009

Species of moth

Hilarographa bosavina is a species of moth of the family Tortricidae. Formally described in 2009, it is named after its type locality, Mount Bosavi in Papua New Guinea. The only known specimen of this moth had a wingspan of 19 mm (0.75 in). It has an dark yellow and orange-brown forewing and orange-yellow hindwing. It is a Papuan endemic, being known only from its type locality in the Southern Highlands, where it was collected at an elevation of 2,300 ft (700 m).

== Taxonomy ==
Hilarographa bosavina was formally described by the Polish entomologist Józef Razowski in 2009 based on an adult female collected from Mount Bosavi in Papua New Guinea. The species is named after its type locality.

== Description ==
The only known specimen of this moth, an adult female, had a wingspan of 19 mm (0.75 in). Both the dorsal and ventral surfaces of the forewing are have a base colour of dark yellow, the fourth of the wing on the posterior end of the dorsum being an orange-marked brown. The termen is yellow dorsally, while the costa is marked with yellow and whitish lines. The cilia of the forewing are olive-brown, except near the tornus, where they are yellow. The dorsal and ventral surfaces of the hindwing are orange-yellow with dark brown edges. The cilia of the hindwing are cream-orange with a brown wash towards the tip and a brown band at the base. The thorax and head are olive brown. The labial palpus is also largely olive brown, brownish at the tip and lighter olive-brown at the base. The apex of the tegula is cream-coloured.

== Distribution and habitat ==
Hilarographa bosavina is a Papuan endemic, being known only from its type locality of Mount Bosavi in the Southern Highlands of Papua New Guinea. It was collected at an elevation of 2,300 ft (700 m) above sea level.
