= Hilarographa caminodes =

Scientific classification
- Kingdom: Animalia
- Phylum: Arthropoda
- Class: Insecta
- Order: Lepidoptera
- Family: Tortricidae
- Genus: Hilarographa
- Species: H. caminodes

Binomial name
- Hilarographa caminodes (Meyrick, 1905)

Synonyms
- Thaumatographa caminodes Meyrick, 1905

Species of moth

Hilarographa caminodes is a species of moth of the family Tortricidae first described by Edward Meyrick in 1905. It is found in Sri Lanka and India.

The larvae feed on Elettaria cardamomum. Females lay eggs on the exposed upper part of the bulbs.
