= Hilarographa jonesi =

Scientific classification
- Kingdom: Animalia
- Phylum: Arthropoda
- Class: Insecta
- Order: Lepidoptera
- Family: Tortricidae
- Genus: Hilarographa
- Species: H. jonesi

Binomial name
- Hilarographa jonesi Brower, 1953

Synonyms
- Thaumatographa jonesi

Species of moth

Hilarographa jonesi , the psychedelic Jones moth, is a species of moth of the family Tortricidae. It is found in the United States from Massachusetts south to Florida and west to Louisiana. The habitat consists of pine forests.

The wingspan is about 12–14 mm. Adults have a striking red and orange color pattern.

== Etymology ==
The species is named in honor of Dr. F. M. Jones, who collected specimens of this species.
