= Hilarographa undosa =

Scientific classification
- Kingdom: Animalia
- Phylum: Arthropoda
- Class: Insecta
- Order: Lepidoptera
- Family: Tortricidae
- Genus: Hilarographa
- Species: H. undosa

Binomial name
- Hilarographa undosa (Diakonoff, 1977)

Synonyms
- Thaumatographa undosa Diakonoff, 1977

Species of moth

Hilarographa undosa is a species of moth of the family Tortricidae. It is found in New Guinea.
