= Hilarographa dolichosticha =

Scientific classification
- Kingdom: Animalia
- Phylum: Arthropoda
- Class: Insecta
- Order: Lepidoptera
- Family: Tortricidae
- Genus: Hilarographa
- Species: H. dolichosticha

Binomial name
- Hilarographa dolichosticha (Diakonoff, 1977)

Synonyms
- Thaumatographa dolichosticha Diakonoff, 1977

Species of moth

Hilarographa dolichosticha is a species of moth of the family Tortricidae. It is found on Java.
