= Hilarographa mesostigmatias =

Scientific classification
- Kingdom: Animalia
- Phylum: Arthropoda
- Class: Insecta
- Order: Lepidoptera
- Family: Tortricidae
- Genus: Hilarographa
- Species: H. mesostigmatias

Binomial name
- Hilarographa mesostigmatias (Diakonoff, 1977)

Synonyms
- Thaumatographa mesostigmatias Diakonoff, 1977; Hilarographa mesostigmatis

Species of moth

Hilarographa mesostigmatias is a species of moth of the family Tortricidae. It is found in Taiwan.
