= Hilarographa ludens =

Scientific classification
- Kingdom: Animalia
- Phylum: Arthropoda
- Class: Insecta
- Order: Lepidoptera
- Family: Tortricidae
- Genus: Hilarographa
- Species: H. ludens

Binomial name
- Hilarographa ludens Diakonoff, 1948

Synonyms
- Thaumatographa ludens

Species of moth

Hilarographa ludens is a species of moth of the family Tortricidae. It is found on Buru of Indonesia.
