= Hilarographa crocochorista =

Scientific classification
- Kingdom: Animalia
- Phylum: Arthropoda
- Class: Insecta
- Order: Lepidoptera
- Family: Tortricidae
- Genus: Hilarographa
- Species: H. crocochorista

Binomial name
- Hilarographa crocochorista (Diakonoff, 1983)

Synonyms
- Thaumatographa crocochorista Diakonoff, 1983

Species of moth

Hilarographa crocochorista is a species of moth of the family Tortricidae. It is found on Java.
