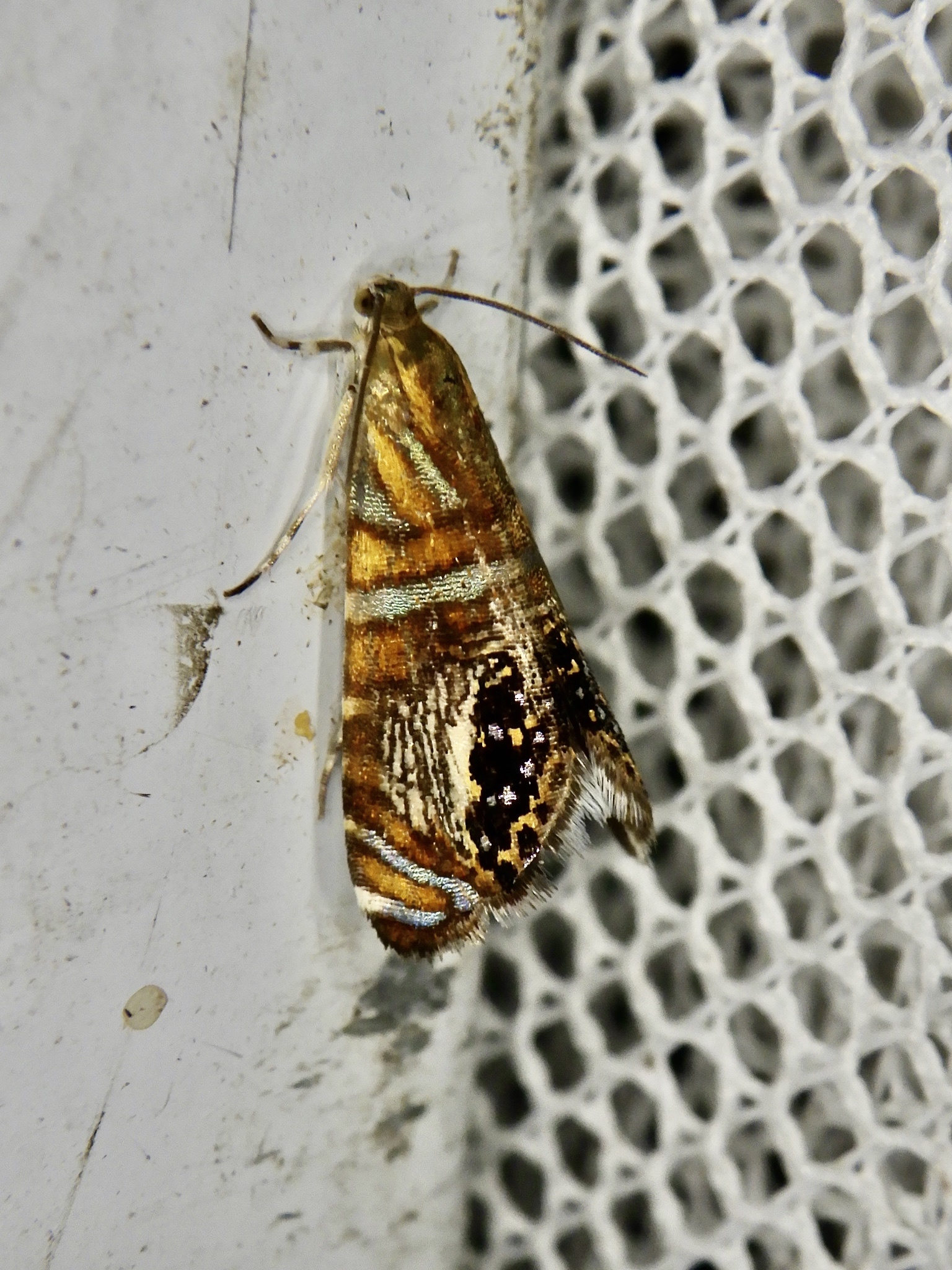

Scientific classification
- Kingdom: Animalia
- Phylum: Arthropoda
- Clade: Pancrustacea
- Class: Insecta
- Order: Lepidoptera
- Family: Tortricidae
- Genus: Hilarographa
- Species: H. decoris

Binomial name
- Hilarographa decoris Diakonoff & Arita, 1976

Synonyms
- Thaumatographa decoris

= Hilarographa decoris =

Species of moth

Hilarographa decoris is a species of moth in the family Tortricidae. It is found on the Kuril Islands, Sakhalin and Japan.
