= Mergui Road =

Mergui Road was a transit route in the area of the Singkhon Pass between Burma and Thailand, built and used during World War II by Imperial Japan. The road connected Prachuap Khiri Khan to Mergui via Tenasserim on the Burmese south coast. It was hastily constructed under supervision of the Japanese army as a means of retreat in 1945, as British and American bombings destroyed the rail tracks.

Mergui Road was built by romusha Asian laborers and Allied prisoners of war under brutal slave labor conditions.

== See also ==
- Burma Railway
- Kra Isthmus Railway
