= Hilarographa zapyra =

Scientific classification
- Kingdom: Animalia
- Phylum: Arthropoda
- Class: Insecta
- Order: Lepidoptera
- Family: Tortricidae
- Genus: Hilarographa
- Species: H. zapyra

Binomial name
- Hilarographa zapyra Meyrick, 1886

Synonyms
- Thaumatographa zapyra

Species of moth

Hilarographa zapyra is a species of moth of the family Tortricidae. It is found in New Guinea.

The wingspan is about 15 mm. The forewings are bright deep orange, marbled with numerous dark lines. The hindwings are bright orange, suffusedly margined with dark fuscous.
