= Hilarographa hermatodes =

Scientific classification
- Kingdom: Animalia
- Phylum: Arthropoda
- Class: Insecta
- Order: Lepidoptera
- Family: Tortricidae
- Genus: Hilarographa
- Species: H. hermatodes

Binomial name
- Hilarographa hermatodes Meyrick, 1909

Synonyms
- Thaumatographa hermatodes

Species of moth

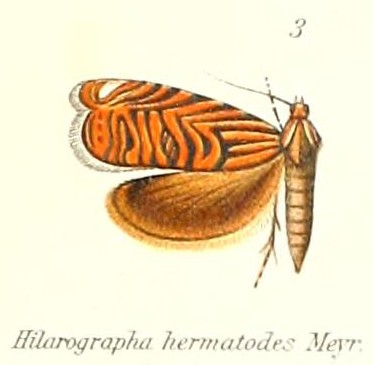
Hilarographa hermatodes

Hilarographa hermatodes is a species of moth of the family Tortricidae. It is found in Sri Lanka.
