= Hilarographa cubensis =

Scientific classification
- Kingdom: Animalia
- Phylum: Arthropoda
- Clade: Pancrustacea
- Class: Insecta
- Order: Lepidoptera
- Family: Tortricidae
- Genus: Hilarographa
- Species: H. cubensis

Binomial name
- Hilarographa cubensis (Heppner, 1983)

Synonyms
- Thaumatographa cubensis Heppner, 1983

Species of moth

Hilarographa cubensis is a species of moth of the family Tortricidae. It is found on Cuba.

The larvae feed on Pinus species.
