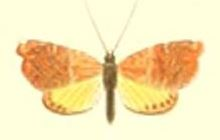

Scientific classification
- Kingdom: Animalia
- Phylum: Arthropoda
- Class: Insecta
- Order: Lepidoptera
- Family: Tortricidae
- Genus: Hilarographa
- Species: H. excellens

Binomial name
- Hilarographa excellens (Pagenstecher, 1900)

Synonyms
- Thaumatographa excellens Pagenstecher, 1900; Hilarographa pyranthis Meyrick, 1907

= Hilarographa excellens =

Species of moth

Hilarographa excellens is a species of moth of the family Tortricidae. It is found on the Bismarck Islands in the western Pacific Ocean.
