= Hilarographa tetralina =

Scientific classification
- Kingdom: Animalia
- Phylum: Arthropoda
- Class: Insecta
- Order: Lepidoptera
- Family: Tortricidae
- Genus: Hilarographa
- Species: H. tetralina

Binomial name
- Hilarographa tetralina Meyrick, 1930

Synonyms
- Thaumatographa tetralina

Species of insect

Hilarographa tetralina is a species of moth of the family Tortricidae. It is found on the Solomon Islands.
