= Hilarographa ferox =

Scientific classification
- Kingdom: Animalia
- Phylum: Arthropoda
- Class: Insecta
- Order: Lepidoptera
- Family: Tortricidae
- Genus: Hilarographa
- Species: H. ferox

Binomial name
- Hilarographa ferox Meyrick, 1921

Synonyms
- Thaumatographa ferox

Species of moth

Hilarographa ferox is a species of moth of the family Tortricidae. It is found on Java.
