= Hilarographa regalis =

Scientific classification
- Kingdom: Animalia
- Phylum: Arthropoda
- Class: Insecta
- Order: Lepidoptera
- Family: Tortricidae
- Genus: Hilarographa
- Species: H. regalis

Binomial name
- Hilarographa regalis (Walsingham, 1881)

Synonyms
- Glyphipteryx regalis Walsingham, 1881; Thaumatographa regalis

Species of moth

Hilarographa regalis is a species of moth of the family Tortricidae. It is found in California, United States.

The wingspan is about 20–21 mm.
