= Hilarographa calathisca =

Scientific classification
- Kingdom: Animalia
- Phylum: Arthropoda
- Class: Insecta
- Order: Lepidoptera
- Family: Tortricidae
- Genus: Hilarographa
- Species: H. calathisca

Binomial name
- Hilarographa calathisca Meyrick, 1909

Synonyms
- Thaumatographa calathisca

Species of moth

Hilarographa calathisca is a species of moth of the family Tortricidae. It is found in Assam, India.

The larvae feed on the flowers of Ixora species.
