= Thein Daw Gyi Pagoda =

Buddhist pagoda in Myeik, Myanmar

Lay-Gyun Hsimi Theindawgyi Pagoda
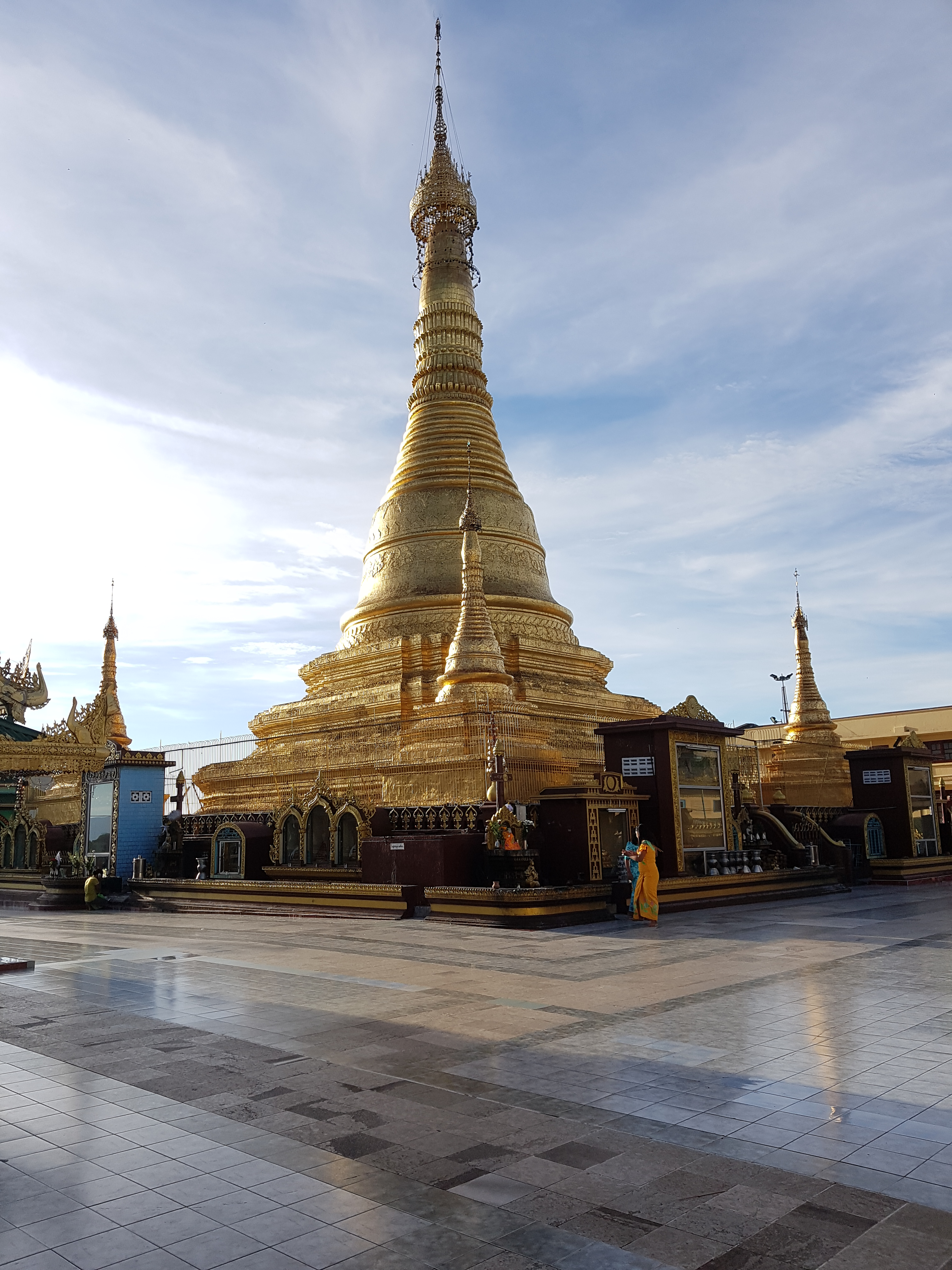
- Thein Daw Gyi Pagoda

Religion
- Affiliation: Theravada Buddhism

Location
- Location: Myeik, Tanintharyi Region
- Country: Myanmar
- Interactive map of Lay-Gyun Hsimi Theindawgyi Pagoda
- Coordinates: 12°26′24″N 98°35′51″E

Lay-Gyun Hsimi Theindawgyi Pagoda (Burmese: လေးကျွန်း ဆီမီး သိမ်တော်ကြီး စေတီတော်) is a Buddhist pagoda in Myeik, Tanintharyi Region, Myanmar. The pagoda is the largest pagoda in Myeik and is a popular tourist attraction. Thein Daw Gyi pagoda was situated over (280) years since Myanmar year (1093). The complex features a historical Thai-style pagoda, a Buddhist cultural museum, a library, and a preaching hall. It is a notable vantage point for viewing the sunset and panoramic views of Myeik, and we can play Marhar Atula Yanthi from Thein Daw Gyi Pagoda. The pagoda was built between 1772 and 1778.. It is located at SEIKNGE Quarter, Myeik.
