= Hilarographa cladara =

Scientific classification
- Kingdom: Animalia
- Phylum: Arthropoda
- Class: Insecta
- Order: Lepidoptera
- Family: Tortricidae
- Genus: Hilarographa
- Species: H. cladara

Binomial name
- Hilarographa cladara (Diakonoff, 1977)

Synonyms
- Thaumatographa cladara Diakonoff, 1977

Species of moth

Hilarographa cladara is a species of moth of the family Tortricidae. It is found on Borneo.

The wingspan is about 10 mm.
