= Macrochlidia monotona =

Scientific classification
- Kingdom: Animalia
- Phylum: Arthropoda
- Class: Insecta
- Order: Lepidoptera
- Family: Tortricidae
- Genus: Macrochlidia
- Species: M. monotona

Binomial name
- Macrochlidia monotona (Razowski & Pelz, 2005)

Synonyms
- Heppnerographa monotana Razowski & Pelz, 2005

Species of moth

Macrochlidia monotona is a species of moth of the family Tortricidae. It is found in Ecuador.
