= Hilarographa ceramopa =

Scientific classification
- Kingdom: Animalia
- Phylum: Arthropoda
- Class: Insecta
- Order: Lepidoptera
- Family: Tortricidae
- Genus: Hilarographa
- Species: H. ceramopa

Binomial name
- Hilarographa ceramopa Meyrick, 1920

Synonyms
- Thaumatographa ceramopa

Species of moth

Hilarographa ceramopa is a species of moth of the family Tortricidae. It is found in Assam, India.
