= Hilarographa leucopyrga =

Scientific classification
- Kingdom: Animalia
- Phylum: Arthropoda
- Class: Insecta
- Order: Lepidoptera
- Family: Tortricidae
- Genus: Hilarographa
- Species: H. leucopyrga

Binomial name
- Hilarographa leucopyrga Meyrick, 1912

Species of moth

Hilarographa leucopyrga is a species of moth of the family Tortricidae. It is found on Java and on Kyushu island in Japan.

The larvae feed on Ardisia species. They feed in the shoots of their host plant.
