= Hilarographa merinthias =

Scientific classification
- Kingdom: Animalia
- Phylum: Arthropoda
- Class: Insecta
- Order: Lepidoptera
- Family: Tortricidae
- Genus: Hilarographa
- Species: H. merinthias

Binomial name
- Hilarographa merinthias Meyrick, 1909

Synonyms
- Thaumatographa merinthias

Species of moth

Hilarographa merinthias is a species of moth of the family Tortricidae. It is found in Assam, India.
