= Hilarographa eremnotorna =

Scientific classification
- Kingdom: Animalia
- Phylum: Arthropoda
- Clade: Pancrustacea
- Class: Insecta
- Order: Lepidoptera
- Family: Tortricidae
- Genus: Hilarographa
- Species: H. eremnotorna

Binomial name
- Hilarographa eremnotorna Diakonoff & Arita, 1976

Synonyms
- Thaumatographa eremnotorna

Species of moth

Hilarographa eremnotorna is a species of moth of the family Tortricidae. It is found on Honshu island in Japan.

The larvae feed on Pinus densiflora.
