= Hilarographa tornoxena =

Scientific classification
- Kingdom: Animalia
- Phylum: Arthropoda
- Class: Insecta
- Order: Lepidoptera
- Family: Tortricidae
- Genus: Hilarographa
- Species: H. tornoxena

Binomial name
- Hilarographa tornoxena (Diakonoff, 1977)

Synonyms
- Thaumatographa tornoxena Diakonoff, 1977

Species of moth

Hilarographa tornoxena is a species of moth of the family Tortricidae. It is found on Java, Indonesia.
