= Hilarographa spermatodesma =

Scientific classification
- Kingdom: Animalia
- Phylum: Arthropoda
- Class: Insecta
- Order: Lepidoptera
- Family: Tortricidae
- Genus: Hilarographa
- Species: H. spermatodesma

Binomial name
- Hilarographa spermatodesma Diakonoff, 1955

Synonyms
- Thaumatographa spermatodesma

Species of moth

Hilarographa spermatodesma is a species of moth of the family Tortricidae. It is found in New Guinea.
