= Hilarographa citharistis =

Scientific classification
- Kingdom: Animalia
- Phylum: Arthropoda
- Class: Insecta
- Order: Lepidoptera
- Family: Tortricidae
- Genus: Hilarographa
- Species: H. citharistis

Binomial name
- Hilarographa citharistis Meyrick, 1909

Synonyms
- Thaumatographa citharistis Diakonoff, 1977

Species of moth

Hilarographa citharistis is a species of moth of the family Tortricidae. It is found in Assam, India.
