= Hilarographa oenobapta =

Scientific classification
- Kingdom: Animalia
- Phylum: Arthropoda
- Class: Insecta
- Order: Lepidoptera
- Family: Tortricidae
- Genus: Hilarographa
- Species: H. oenobapta

Binomial name
- Hilarographa oenobapta (Diakonoff, 1977)

Synonyms
- Thaumatographa oenobapta Diakonoff, 1977

Species of moth

Hilarographa oenobapta is a species of moth of the family Tortricidae. It is found on Java in Indonesia.
