= Hilarographa machaerophora =

Scientific classification
- Kingdom: Animalia
- Phylum: Arthropoda
- Clade: Pancrustacea
- Class: Insecta
- Order: Lepidoptera
- Family: Tortricidae
- Genus: Hilarographa
- Species: H. machaerophora

Binomial name
- Hilarographa machaerophora Diakonoff & Arita, 1976

Synonyms
- Thaumatographa machaerophora

Species of moth

Hilarographa machaerophora is a species of moth of the family Tortricidae. It is found on Honshu island in Japan.
