= Hilarographa aurosa =

Scientific classification
- Kingdom: Animalia
- Phylum: Arthropoda
- Clade: Pancrustacea
- Class: Insecta
- Order: Lepidoptera
- Family: Tortricidae
- Genus: Hilarographa
- Species: H. aurosa

Binomial name
- Hilarographa aurosa Diakonoff & Arita, 1976

Synonyms
- Thaumatographa aurosa

Species of moth

Hilarographa aurosa is a species of moth of the family Tortricidae. It is found on Yakushima Island in Japan.
