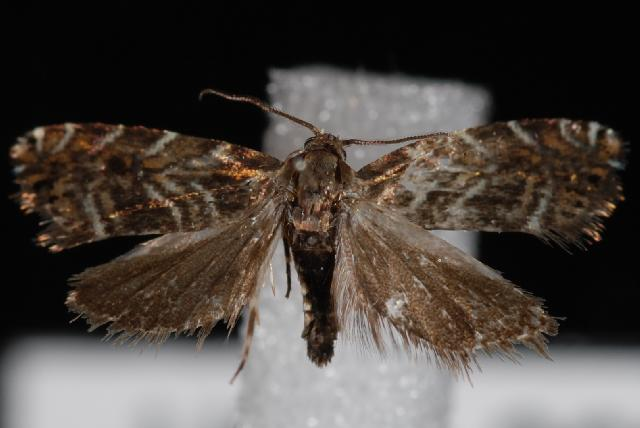

Scientific classification
- Kingdom: Animalia
- Phylum: Arthropoda
- Class: Insecta
- Order: Lepidoptera
- Family: Tortricidae
- Genus: Hilarographa
- Species: H. youngiella

Binomial name
- Hilarographa youngiella Busck, 1922

Synonyms
- Thaumatographa youngiella; Hilarographa olympica Braun, 1923

= Hilarographa youngiella =

Species of moth

Hilarographa youngiella is a species of moth of the family Tortricidae. It is found in North America, including Washington and Vancouver Island.
