= Hilarographa grapholithana =

Scientific classification
- Kingdom: Animalia
- Phylum: Arthropoda
- Class: Insecta
- Order: Lepidoptera
- Family: Tortricidae
- Genus: Hilarographa
- Species: H. grapholithana

Binomial name
- Hilarographa grapholithana (Razowski & Pelz, 2005)

Synonyms
- Heppnerographa grapholithana Razowski & Pelz, 2005

Species of moth

Hilarographa grapholithana is a species of moth of the family Tortricidae. It is found in Morona-Santiago Province, Ecuador.
