= Myeik, Myanmar =

City in Tanintharyi Region, Myanmar

Myeik မြိတ်မြို့ (Burmese) Mergui
- City
- Myeik
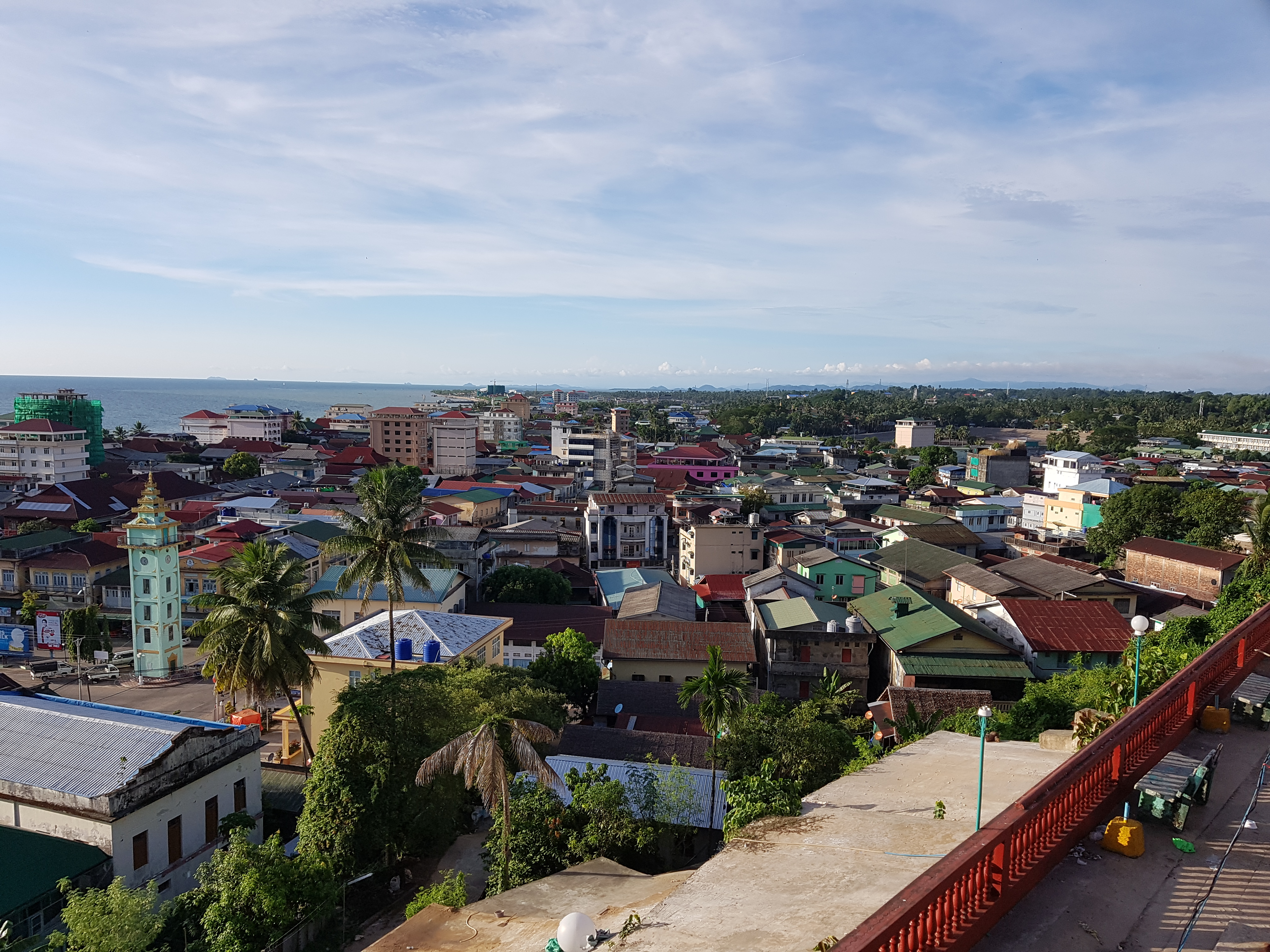

- Location within Myanmar Myeik (Southeast Asia) Myeik (Asia)
- Coordinates: 12°26′00″N 98°36′00″E
- Country: Myanmar
- Region: Tanintharyi Region
- District: Myeik District
- Township: Myeik Township

Area
  - Total: 1,417.9 km^{2} (547.5 sq mi)
  - Land: 1,417.9 km^{2} (547.5 sq mi)
- Elevation: 11 m (36 ft)

Population (2014)
  - Total: 284,498
  - Density: 200.65/km^{2} (519.67/sq mi)

Religions
  - Buddhism: 92%
  - Islam: 6%
  - Christianity: 2%
- Time zone: UTC+06:30 (MMT)
- Postal code: 14051
- Area code: 59

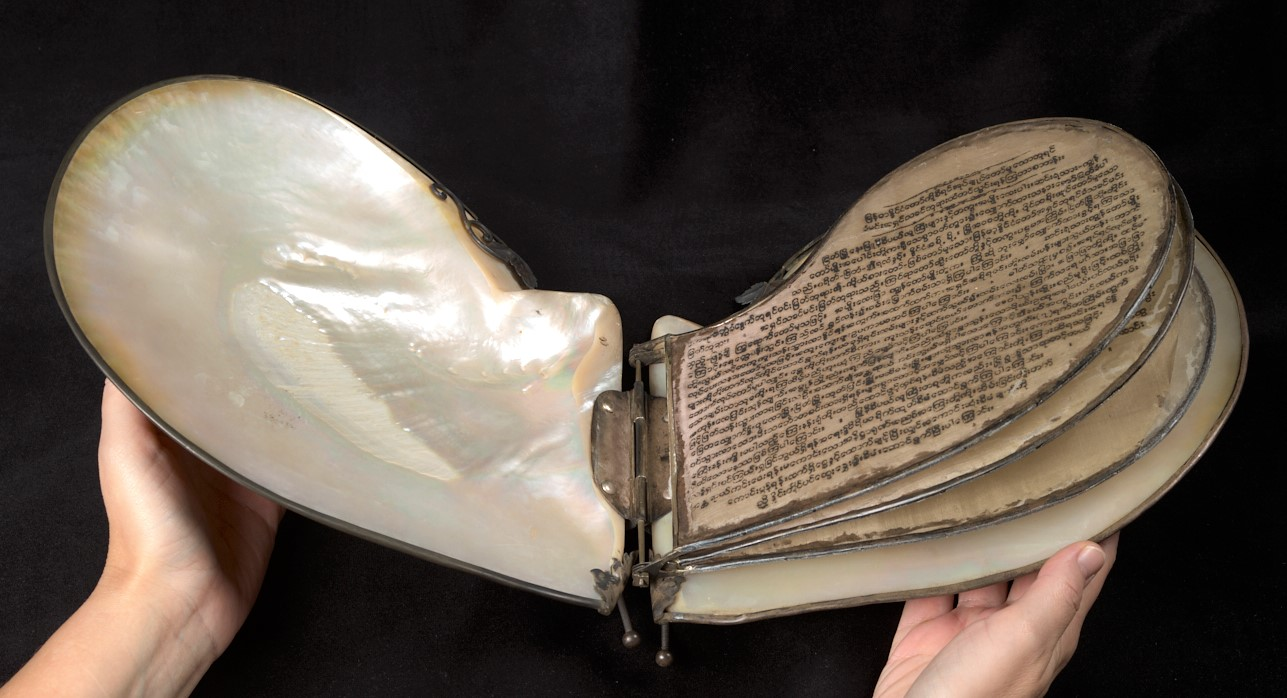
Petition to the British Governor of Burma from the people of Myeik. Letter in formal Burmese, printed in silk and encased in an oyster shell, ca. 1907. British Library

Myeik (Burmese: မြိတ်, MLCTS: mrit, pronounced [mjeɪʔ] or [beɪʔ]; Mon: ဗိက်, [pòik]; Thai: มะริด, RTGS: Marit, [má(ʔ).rít]; formerly Mergui, /mɜːrˈɡwiː/) is a rural city in Tanintharyi Region, Myanmar, located in the extreme south of the country on the coast of the Andaman Sea. As of 2010, the estimated population was over 209,000. Myeik is the largest city in Tanintharyi Region, and serves as the regional headquarters of the Myanmar Navy's Tanintharyi Regional Command. The area inland from the city is a major smuggling corridor into Thailand. The Singkhon Pass, also known as the Maw-daung Pass, has an international cross-border checkpoint.

== History ==
Myeik was the southernmost part of the Pagan Kingdom from the 11th to 13th centuries. After the Pagan Empire's collapse in 1287, Myeik became part of successive Thai kingdoms from the late 13th century to the middle of 18th century: first the Sukhothai Kingdom and later the Ayutthaya Kingdom. A brief period of Burmese rule interrupted this between 1564 and 1593.

From the 16th century on, the city was an important seaport and trading center with the Europeans, who would land at Mergui, travel upriver to Tenasserim and then cross the mountains to reach Ayutthaya. The French officer Chevalier de Beauregard was made Governor of the city of Myeik after the Anglo-Siamese War (1687) that resulted in the English being expelled from Siam. De Beauregard was named Governor by Narai, the king of the Ayutthaya Kingdom, replacing an Englishman, Samuel White. The French were then expelled from Myeik following the Siamese revolution of 1688.

The Burmese captured Myeik in 1765 as part of an invasion that would ultimately topple the Ayutthaya Kingdom in 1767. In 1826, the Burmese ceded the region to the British after the First Anglo-Burmese War (1824–1826).

In the Pacific Theater of World War II, Imperial Japanese forces used laborers to hastily construct the Mergui Road to aid their retreat after the rail tracks were destroyed by Allied bombings.

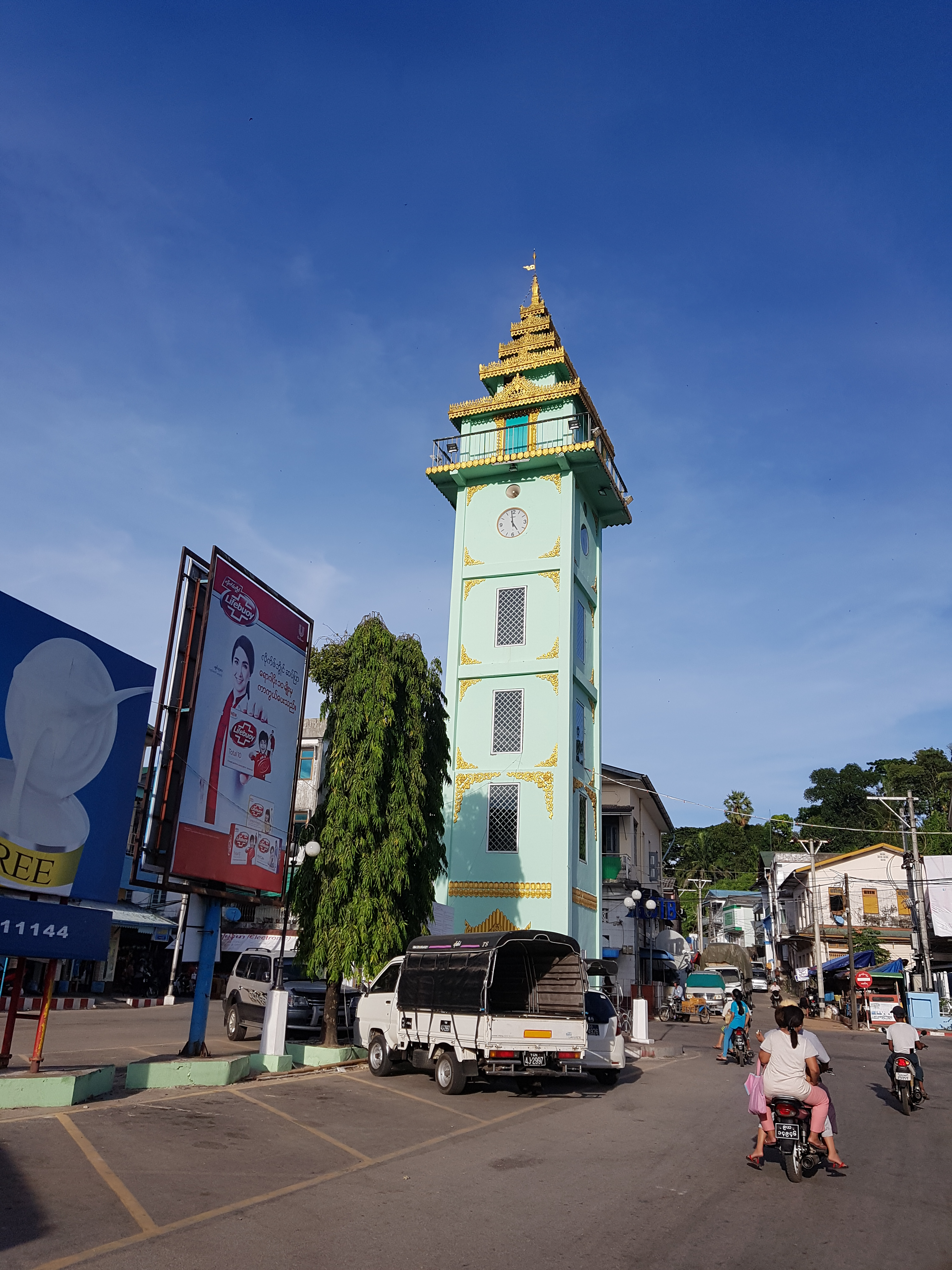
The Clock Tower of Myeik

== Neighborhoods ==
=== Wards ===
1. Kan Hpyar
2. Kan Gyi
3. Kan Khaung
4. Myit Nge
5. Dawei Su
6. Ta Laing Su
7. Zay Tan
8. Nauk Lae
9. Ah Lel Kyun
10. Myeik Taung
11. Yae Pone/ Yae Bone (Known as Nyein Chan Yae)

There are 11 major wards in Myeik. Myeik Taung, Ka Lwin and Yae Pone are the big wards. While Nauk Lae, Seik Nge, Dawei Su, Kan Gyi, Yae Pone being the costal wards.

- Phayakai, Sitt Win, Parami are the sub wards of Myeik Taung ward.
- Than Hpo, Ka Yu Taw, Palauk Su, Phaya Nga Su, Phayar Koe Su and Kyan Daw are the sub wards of Kan Hpyar ward.
- Tapyin and Myan Aung are the sub wards of Kan Gyi ward.
- Kan Baung Yoe and Kyaung Nge are the sub wards of Ah Lel Kyun ward.
- Mee That is the split up ward of Dawei Su. It is also known as little Dawei Su ward.

=== Myeik Taung ===
Myeik Taung is located at the south-east of the city. The Myeik Taung ward shares border with Kan Hpyar ward, Ah Lel Kyun ward and Nauk Lae ward. It is considered the biggest major ward in the entire city. The population is also bigger than other wards.

== Markets and Shopping Centres ==
=== Markets ===
Seik Nge Market is also known and Sibinthaya Market (municipal market). There are 4 major markets in Myeik downtown. They are Seik Nge Market, Thiha Zeyar Market, Nauk Lae Market and Tapyin Market. They open from 5 AM to 6PM everyday except Sundays and holidays. Markets like Palauk Su market, Myit Nge market, Phayar Koe Hsu market are street markets. They are open from 5 AM to 12 PM.

- Seik Nge Market
- Nauk Lae Market
- Thiha Zeyar Market (Myo Thit Market)
- Tapyin Market
- Myit Nge Market
- Yae Pone Market
- Palauk Su Market
- Phayar Koe Hsu Market

=== List of shopping centres ===
Myeik Shopping Centre and Market Garden are located at strand road, Yae Pone Ward.

- Myeik Shopping Centre
- Market Garden Myeik

== Climate ==
Myeik has a tropical monsoon climate (Köppen climate classification Am) that is hot throughout the year. After a short dry season centred on December and January, there is a long wet season from mid-March to mid-November. Heavy rainfall usually occurs from May to September.

Climate data for Myeik (1991–2020, extremes 1934-present)
Month	Jan	Feb	Mar	Apr	May	Jun	Jul	Aug	Sep	Oct	Nov	Dec	Year
Record high °C (°F)	35.0 (95.0)	36.1 (97.0)	37.2 (99.0)	39.2 (102.6)	36.7 (98.1)	36.7 (98.1)	33.9 (93.0)	35.2 (95.4)	32.8 (91.0)	35.6 (96.1)	34.4 (93.9)	36.1 (97.0)	39.2 (102.6)
Mean daily maximum °C (°F)	32.2 (90.0)	33.0 (91.4)	33.7 (92.7)	34.3 (93.7)	32.4 (90.3)	30.6 (87.1)	29.8 (85.6)	29.4 (84.9)	29.9 (85.8)	31.5 (88.7)	32.5 (90.5)	32.1 (89.8)	31.8 (89.2)
Daily mean °C (°F)	27.1 (80.8)	27.9 (82.2)	28.9 (84.0)	29.6 (85.3)	28.6 (83.5)	27.4 (81.3)	26.8 (80.2)	26.6 (79.9)	26.8 (80.2)	27.7 (81.9)	27.9 (82.2)	27.1 (80.8)	27.7 (81.9)
Mean daily minimum °C (°F)	22.0 (71.6)	22.8 (73.0)	24.0 (75.2)	25.0 (77.0)	24.9 (76.8)	24.3 (75.7)	23.9 (75.0)	23.8 (74.8)	23.7 (74.7)	23.8 (74.8)	23.3 (73.9)	22.1 (71.8)	23.6 (74.5)
Record low °C (°F)	11.7 (53.1)	15.6 (60.1)	16.1 (61.0)	18.9 (66.0)	19.4 (66.9)	19.4 (66.9)	18.9 (66.0)	18.9 (66.0)	18.9 (66.0)	17.2 (63.0)	15.0 (59.0)	12.8 (55.0)	11.7 (53.1)
Average precipitation mm (inches)	37.5 (1.48)	43.7 (1.72)	64.7 (2.55)	123.9 (4.88)	448.0 (17.64)	706.9 (27.83)	836.0 (32.91)	876.4 (34.50)	635.2 (25.01)	333.0 (13.11)	59.8 (2.35)	23.0 (0.91)	4,188.1 (164.89)
Average precipitation days (≥ 1.0 mm)	2.4	3.3	5.7	8.4	20.7	25.6	27.4	27.3	25.1	20.1	5.9	1.9	173.9
Average relative humidity (%)	72	72	72	72	82	88	90	90	89	83	76	72	80
Source 1: World Meteorological Organization, Meteomanz (record)
Source 2: Sistema de Clasificación Bioclimática Mundial (records), Danish Meteorological Institute (humidity 1931–1960)

== Demographics ==
The inhabitants of the city are descended from many ethnic groups, including Burman, Burmese Indian, Burmese Chinese, Karen, Mon, and Moken. They speak a dialect of the Burmese language known as the Myeik dialect. According to the 2014 census, Myeik has a total population of 284,498.

== Attractions ==
Myeik is home to notable several Burmese pagodas, the largest of which is the Theindawgyi Pagoda, Paw Taw Mu Pagoda, and Mahatheindizaya Pagoda is famous too. Although it is not in Myeik's area, Myeik Archipelago can be accessed from Myeik Port, and is known for its 800 unspoiled islands. Lately, Myeik has got many new attractions such as newly built Kabarlone Pagoda.

== Economy ==
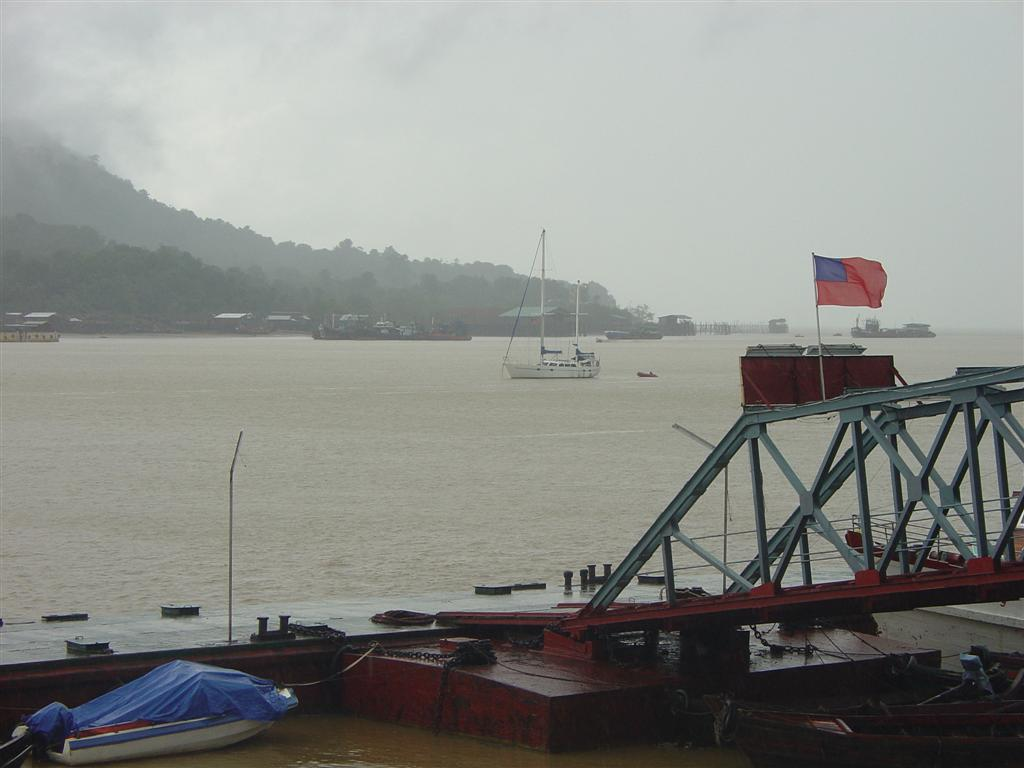
Port of Myeik

The population is primarily engaged in resource extraction industries like fishing, the production of natural rubber and coconuts, the collection of edible bird's nests, and pearl farming. Seafood products like dried fish, dried prawn and ngapi (shrimp paste) are other industries. Myeik is a gateway to the 800 offshore islands of the Mergui Archipelago, which are developing a tourist trade. Tourism in the area is currently restricted to cruises, as land based accommodations are currently non-existent on the islands.

== Education ==
=== Universities ===
- Myeik University
- Polytechnic University, Myeik

=== Basic Education ===
==== High Schools ====
Myeik has 9 Government High Schools (BEHS). Notable schools include:

- No. 1 Basic Education High School (12.445042, 98.602304)
- No. 2 Basic Education High School (12.436227, 98.602957)
- No. 3 Basic Education High School (12.440027, 98.598910)

There are 11 BEMS schools, three of which are BEHS branches, and only one BEPS school.

==== Private Schools ====
- Myint Mo Private High School, Myeik (12.459688, 98.608594)
- Kan Zun Ahin Private High School, Myeik (12.443771, 98.612354)
- Tun Tauk Kyal Private High School, Myeik

=== International Schools ===
- ILBC IGCSE & Preschool (Myeik)

== Health care ==
=== Government Hospitals ===
- Myeik Public Hospital (12.462990, 98.611030)
- Myeik Traditional Medicine Hospital (12.453778, 98.602115)

=== Private Hospitals ===
- Myint Mo Hospital
- Datkhina Dipar Hospital
- Shwe Tara Phu Hospital
- Royal Hospital

== Security ==
- Myeik Police Station (12.437512, 98.598449)

== Notable residents ==
- Htay Myint
- Lwin Moe
- Ngwe Gaing
- Paing Takhon

== See also ==
- Myeik Airport

== Bibliography ==
- Anderson, John (1890). English Intercourse with Siam in the Seventeenth Century. Routledge. ISBN 978-0-415-24548-7.
- Pardieu, Vincent (December 2007) "South Sea Cultured Pearls From Mergui, Burma (Myanmar)"
- Smithies, Michael, ed. (2002). Three Military Accounts of the 1688 "Revolution" in Siam. Translated by Michael Smithies. Bangkok: Orchid Press. ISBN 978-974-524-005-6.
