= 1688 =

1688 in various calendars
- Gregorian calendar: 1688; MDCLXXXVIII
- Ab urbe condita: 2441
- Armenian calendar: 1137; ԹՎ ՌՃԼԷ
- Assyrian calendar: 6438
- Balinese saka calendar: 1609–1610
- Bengali calendar: 1094–1095
- Berber calendar: 2638
- English Regnal year: 3 Ja. 2 – 1 Will. & Mar.
- Buddhist calendar: 2232
- Burmese calendar: 1050
- Byzantine calendar: 7196–7197
- Chinese calendar: 丁卯年 (Fire Rabbit); 4385 or 4178 — to — 戊辰年 (Earth Dragon); 4386 or 4179
- Coptic calendar: 1404–1405
- Discordian calendar: 2854
- Ethiopian calendar: 1680–1681
- Hebrew calendar: 5448–5449
- Hindu calendars
- Vikram Samvat: 1744–1745
- Shaka Samvat: 1609–1610
- Kali Yuga: 4788–4789
- Holocene calendar: 11688
- Igbo calendar: 688–689
- Iranian calendar: 1066–1067
- Islamic calendar: 1099–1100
- Japanese calendar: Jōkyō 5 / Genroku 1 (元禄元年)
- Javanese calendar: 1611–1612
- Julian calendar: Gregorian minus 10 days
- Korean calendar: 4021
- Minguo calendar: 224 before ROC 民前224年
- Nanakshahi calendar: 220
- Thai solar calendar: 2230–2231
- Tibetan calendar: མེ་མོ་ཡོས་ལོ་ (female Fire-Hare); 1814 or 1433 or 661 — to — ས་ཕོ་འབྲུག་ལོ་ (male Earth-Dragon); 1815 or 1434 or 662

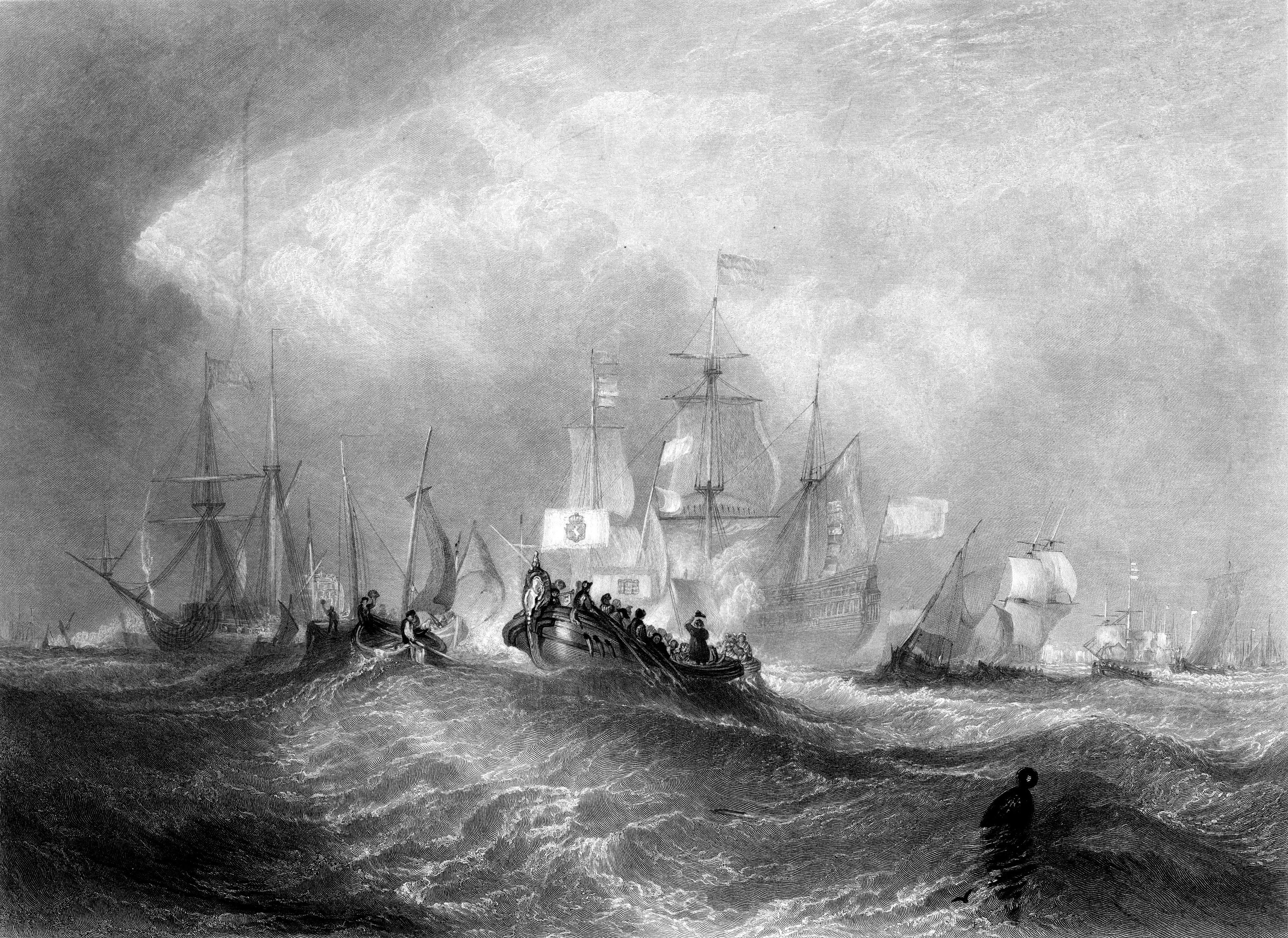
November 15: The Glorious Revolution begins as William of Orange, primary Stadtholder of the Dutch Republic, leads an invasion of England with 20,000 soldiers and marches towards London.

1688 (MDCLXXXVIII) was a leap year starting on Thursday of the Gregorian calendar and a leap year starting on Sunday of the Julian calendar, the 1688th year of the Common Era (CE) and Anno Domini (AD) designations, the 688th year of the 2nd millennium, the 88th year of the 17th century, and the 9th year of the 1680s decade. As of the start of 1688, the Gregorian calendar was 10 days ahead of the Julian calendar, which remained in localized use until 1923.

== Events ==
=== January–March ===
- January 2 – Fleeing from the Spanish Navy, French pirate Raveneau de Lussan and his 70 men arrive on the west coast of Nicaragua, sink their boats, and make a difficult 10 day march to the city of Ocotal.
- January 5 – Pirates Charles Swan and William Dampier and the crew of the privateer Cygnet become the first Englishmen to set foot on the continent of Australia.
- January 11 – The Patta Fort and the Avandha Fort, located in what is now India's Maharashtra state near Ahmednagar, are captured from the Maratha clan by Mughul Army commander Matabar Khan. The Mughal Empire rules the area 73 years.
- January 17 – Ilona Zrínyi, who has defended the Palanok Castle in Hungary from Austrian Imperial forces since 1685, is forced to surrender to General Antonio Caraffa.
- January 29 – Madame Jeanne Guyon, French mystic, is arrested in France and imprisoned for seven months.
- January 30 (January 20, 1687 old style) – King James II of England and Scotland issues a proclamation offering amnesty to pirates in the West Indies who surrender to Sir Robert Holmes.
- February 7 – Six French Jesuit scientists, Joachim Bouvet, Jean-François Gerbillon, Louis-Daniel Lecomte, Guy Tachard, Claude de Visdelou and the leader, Jean de Fontaney, arrive in Beijing and are welcomed by the Emperor of China, Kangxi.
- February 17 – James Renwick, the last of the Covenanters in Scotland to be martyred for opposing the authority of King Charles II, is publicly hanged at Grassmarket square in Edinburgh.
- February 23 – Abaza Siyavuş Pasha, the Grand Vizier of the Ottoman Empire, is assassinated by the Janissaries, the Turkish troops who had placed him in power in September, after the new Sultan fails to make payment of an expected bonus.
- February 28 – The French opera David et Jonathas, composed by Marc-Antoine Charpentier, is performed for the first time.
- March 1 – A great fire devastates Bungay, England.
- March – William Dampier makes the first recorded visit to Christmas Island, now a territory of Australia, located south of the island of Java (now part of Indonesia).

=== April–June ===
- April 3 – Francesco Morosini becomes Doge of Venice.
- April 9 – Morean War: The Venetian forces under Francesco Morosini evacuate Athens and Piraeus.
- April 18 (Julian calendar) – The Germantown Quaker Protest Against Slavery is drafted by four Germantown Quakers.
- May 4 – King James II of England orders his Declaration of Indulgence, suspending penal laws against Catholics, to be read from every Anglican pulpit in England. The Church of England and its staunchest supporters, the peers and gentry, are outraged; on June 8 the Archbishop of Canterbury, William Sancroft, is imprisoned in the Tower of London for refusing to proclaim it.
- May 9 (April 29 OS) – Friedrich Wilhelm, the Great Elector of Brandenburg-Prussia, dies. Friedrich III becomes Elector of Brandenburg-Prussia until 1701, when he becomes the first King of Prussia, as Friedrich I.
- May 10 – King Narai of Ayutthaya nominates Princess Sudawadi as his successor, with Constantine Phaulkon, Mom Pi and Phetracha acting as joint regents.
- May 17 – The arrest of King Narai of Ayutthaya launches a coup d'état.
- June 5
  - A 7.0 magnitude earthquake strikes southern Italy at 6:30 in the evening and kills at least 10,000 people in the Kingdom of Naples in what is now the province of Benevento.
  - Constantine Phaulkon is beheaded after having been arrested in May.
- June 10 – The birth of James Francis Edward Stuart (later known as the Old Pretender), son and heir to James II of England and his Catholic wife Mary of Modena, at St James's Palace in London, increases public disquiet about a Catholic dynasty, particularly when the baby is baptised into the Catholic faith. Rumours about his true maternity swiftly begin to circulate.
- June 24 – French forces under Chevalier de Beauregard abandon their garrison at Mergui, following repeated Siamese attacks; this ultimately leads to their withdrawal from the country.
- June 30 – A high-powered conspiracy of notables (the Immortal Seven) invite Dutch stadtholder William III of Orange and Princess Mary to "defend the liberties of England", and depose King James VII and II.

=== July–September ===
- July 13 – The siege of Negroponte by the Venetians begins.
- August 1 – Phetracha becomes king of Ayutthaya, after a coup d'état.
- August 27 – The funding of the armed invasion of William III in England causes a financial crisis in the Dutch Republic.
- September 6 – Great Turkish War: The Habsburg army captures Belgrade.
- September 24 – Louis XIV publishes his manifesto Memoire de raisons, which lists his grievances and demands. He cites three major things as grievances: Wilhelm Egon von Fürstenberg, who had been earlier elected to be the coadjutor-archbishop of Cologne with support of Louis being vetoed by the pope, the continued aggressions and forming of alliances against France and providing an alternative to Fürstenberg in the Cologne election by the Holy Roman Empire, and Philip William becoming Elector Palatine and seizing the territory, which he believed belonged to Elizabeth Charlotte.
- September 27 – The Nine Years' War begins in Europe and America after Louis XIV attacks Philippsburg in the Holy Roman Empire.

=== October–December ===
- October 21 – The Venetians raise the siege of Negroponte.
- October 26 – King James II of England dismisses his minister Robert Spencer, 2nd Earl of Sunderland.
- November 11 (November 1 OS) – Glorious Revolution: William III of Orange sets sail a second time from Hellevoetsluis, the Netherlands, to take over England, Scotland and Ireland from King James II of England.
- November 15 (November 5 OS) – The Glorious Revolution begins: William of Orange lands at Torbay, England with a multinational force of 20,000 soldiers. He makes no claim to the British Crown, saying only that he has come to save Protestantism and to maintain English liberty, and begins a march on London.
- November 19 (November 9 OS) – William of Orange captures Exeter, after the magistrates flee the city.
- November 20 (November 10 OS) – The Wincanton Skirmish between forces loyal to James II led by Patrick Sarsfield and a party of Dutch troops is one of the few armed clashes in England during the Glorious Revolution.
- November 23 – A group of 1,500 Old Believers immolate themselves to avoid capture, when troops of the tsar lay siege to their monastery on Lake Onega.
- November 26 – Hearing that William of Orange has landed in England, Louis XIV declares war on the Netherlands.
- December 7 –
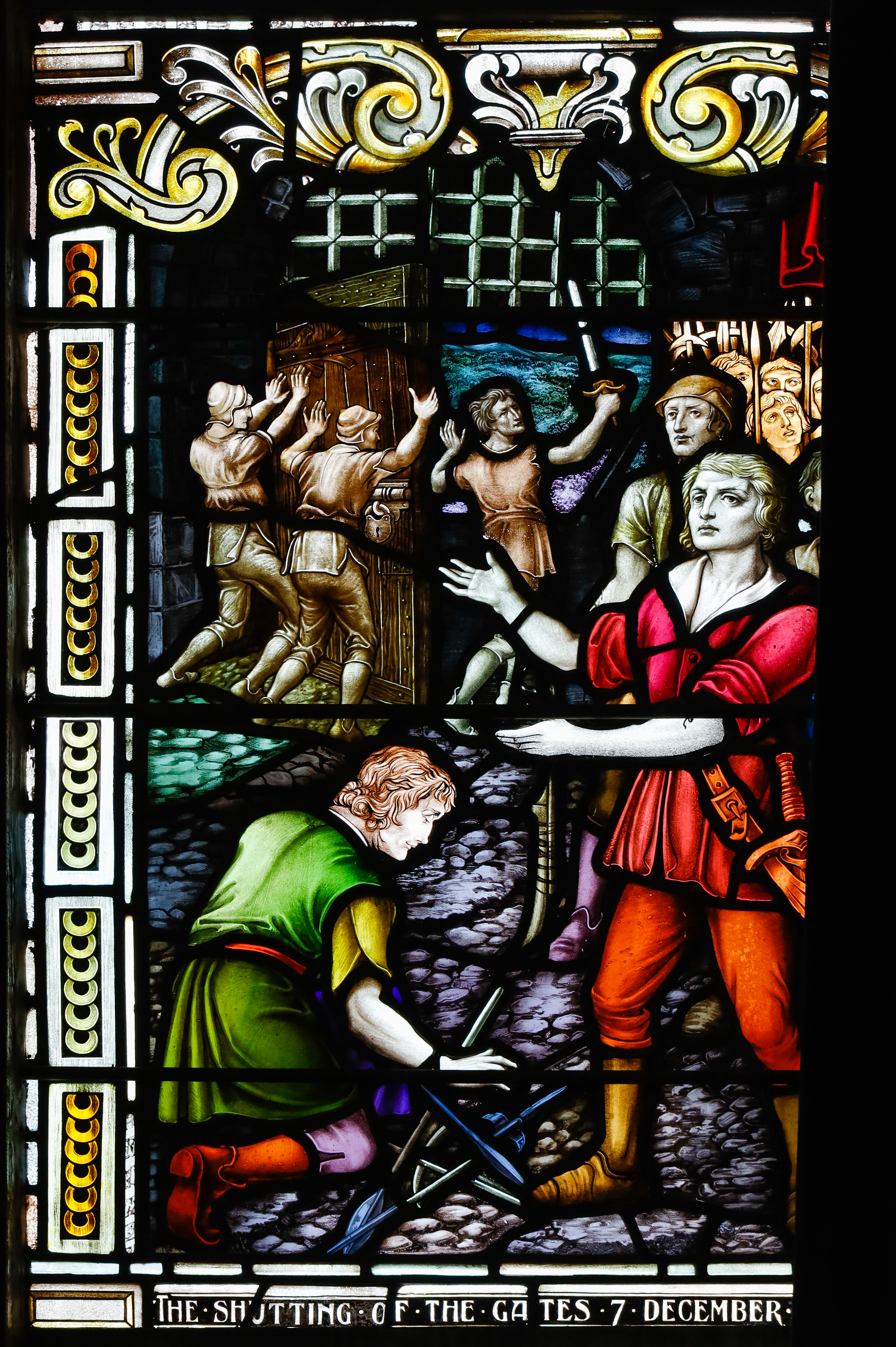
  December 7: The shutting of the gates in Derry in a stained glass window of the Guildhall
  The gates of Derry are shut by the "Brave Thirteen" Apprentice Boys in front of the Jacobite Earl of Antrim and his "redshanks". This initiates the siege of Derry, which is the first major event in the Williamite War in Ireland.
- December 9 – The Battle of Reading takes place in Reading, Berkshire. It is the only substantial military action in England during the Glorious Revolution and ends in a decisive victory for forces loyal to William of Orange.
- December 11 – Having led his army to Salisbury and been deserted by his troops, James VII and II attempts to flee to France.
- December 18 – William of Orange, Stadtholder of the Dutch Republic and the future King William III of the United Kingdom, enters London.

=== Date unknown ===
- The Austrians incite the Chiprovtsi Uprising against the Ottomans in Bulgaria after the siege of Belgrade.
- Neuruppin becomes a Prussian garrison town.
- The earliest known mention of the balalaika is made.
- Oroonoko, one of the first English novels and the first by a professional female author (Aphra Behn) is published.

== Births ==
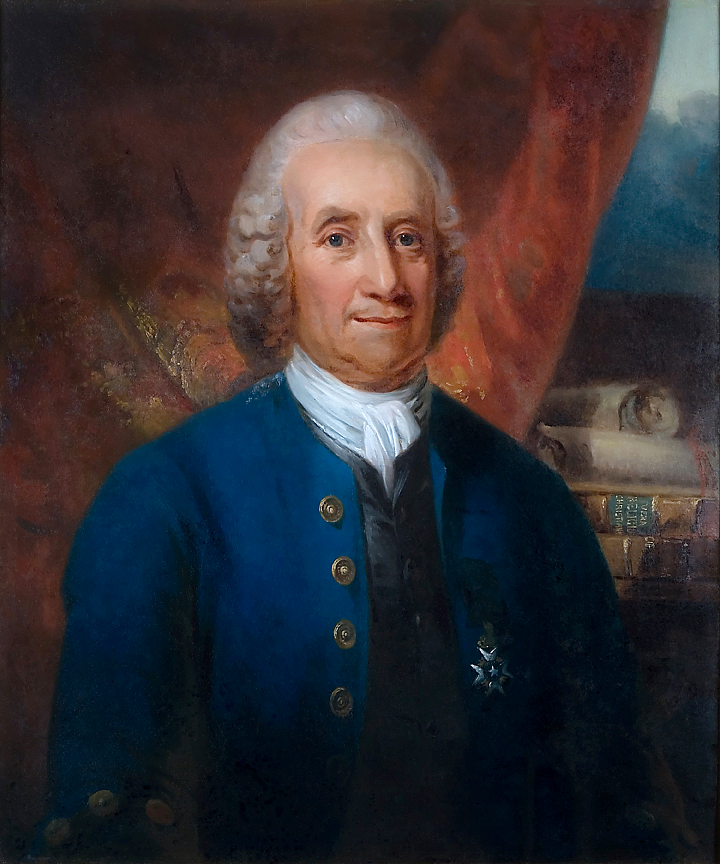
Emanuel Swedenborg

- January 15 – Maria van Lommen, Dutch gold- and silversmith (d. 1742)
- January 18 – Lionel Cranfield Sackville, 1st Duke of Dorset, Lord Lieutenant of Ireland (d. 1765)
- January 23 – Queen Ulrika Eleonora of Sweden (d. 1741)
- January 29 – Emanuel Swedenborg, Swedish scientist, philosopher and theologian (d. 1772)
- February 4 – Pierre de Marivaux, French playwright (d. 1763)
- March – William Burnet, British colonial administrator (d. 1729)
- March 14 – Anna Maria Garthwaite, British designer (d. 1763)
- April 4 – Joseph-Nicolas Delisle, French astronomer (d. 1768)
- April 15 – Johann Friedrich Fasch, German composer (d. 1758)
- May 21 – Alexander Pope, English poet (d. 1744)
- June 10 – James Francis Edward Stuart, The Old Pretender, claimant to the English and Scottish throne (d. 1766)
- July 19 – Giuseppe Castiglione, Italian missionary to China (d. 1766)
- June 30 – Abu l-Hasan Ali I, ruler of Tunisia (d. 1756)
- August 14 – King Frederick William I of Prussia (d. 1740)
- September 12 – Ferdinand Brokoff, Czech sculptor (d. 1731)
- October 17 – Domenico Zipoli, Italian-born composer (d. 1726)
- October 22 – Nader Shah of Persia (d. 1747)
- November 15 (bapt.) – Charles Rivington, English publisher (d. 1742)

== Deaths ==
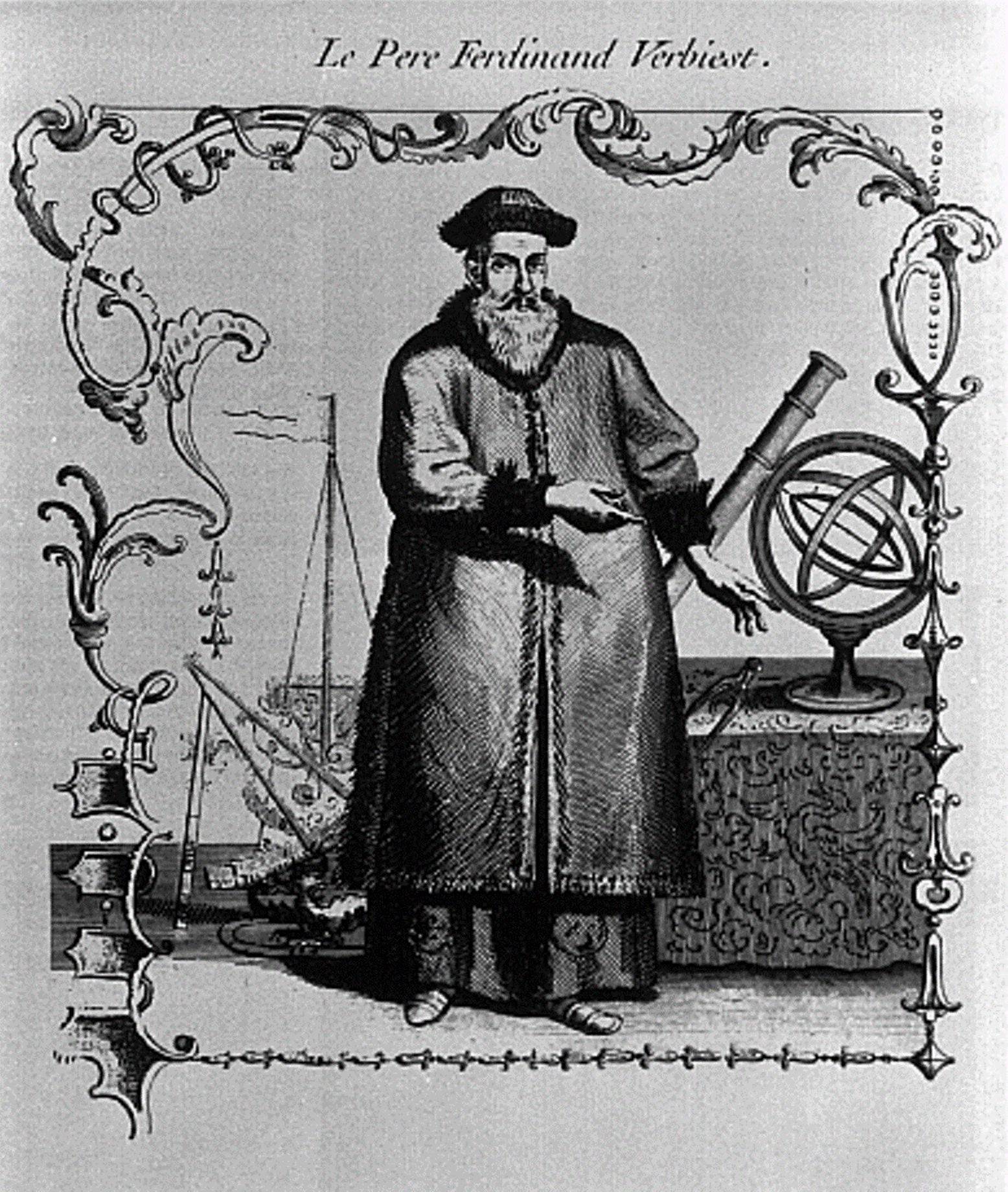
Ferdinand Verbiest

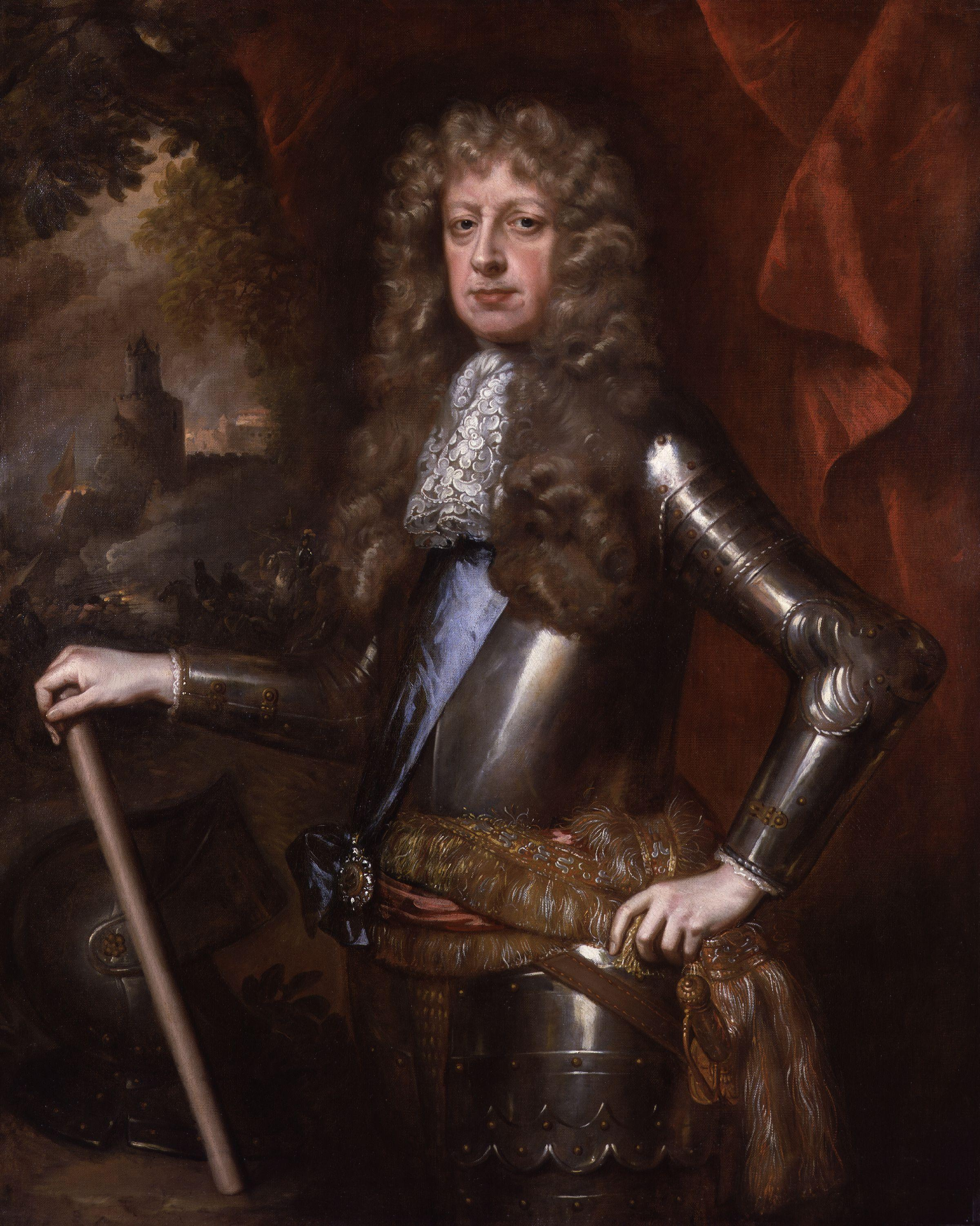
James Butler, 1st Duke of Ormond

- January 7 – James Howard, 3rd Earl of Suffolk
- January 27 – Empress Dowager Xiaozhuang, concubine of Qing Dynasty ruler Hong Taiji (b. 1613)
- January 28 – Ferdinand Verbiest, Flemish Jesuit missionary in China (b. 1623)
- February 2 – Abraham Duquesne, French naval officer (b. 1610)
- February 13 – David Christiani, German mathematician and philosopher (b. 1610)
- February 17 – James Renwick, Scottish minister and Covenanter martyr (b. 1662)
- February 28 – Johann Sigismund Elsholtz, German naturalist and physician (b. 1623)
- March 1 – Sir Thomas Slingsby, 2nd Baronet of England (b. 1636)
- March 3 – Marie de Lorraine, Duchess of Guise (b. 1615)
- March 8 – Honoré Fabri, French mathematician (b. 1608)
- March 20 – Maria of Orange-Nassau, Dutch princess (b. 1642)
- March 23 – Marcantonio Giustinian, 107th Doge of Venice (b. 1619)
- March 26 – Winston Churchill, English noble, soldier (b. 1620)
- March 27 – Frederick, Burgrave of Dohna, Dutch officer, and governor of Orange (b. 1621)
- April 28 – Frederick, Duke of Mecklenburg-Grabow, German nobleman, titular Duke of Mecklenburg (b. 1638)
- April 29 – Friedrich Wilhelm, Elector of Brandenburg (b. 1620)
- May 14 – Antoine Furetière, French writer (b. 1619)
- May 22 – Johannes Andreas Quenstedt, German theologian (b. 1617)
- June 1 – Peder Hansen Resen, Danish historian (b. 1625)
- June 3 – Maximilian Henry of Bavaria, Roman Catholic bishop (b. 1621)
- June 5 – Constantine Phaulkon, Greek adventurer (b. 1647)
- June 26
  - John Claypole, English politician (b. 1625)
  - Ralph Cudworth, English philosopher (b. 1617)
- June 28 – Richard Winwood, English politician (b. 1609)
- June 29 – Ippolito Lante Montefeltro della Rovere, Italian nobleman and Duke of Bomarzo (b. 1618)
- July 11 – King Narai of Thailand (b. 1639)
- July 21 – James Butler, 1st Duke of Ormonde, Irish statesman (b. 1610)
- August 25 – Henry Morgan, Welsh privateer and Governor of Jamaica (b. c. 1635)
- August 31 – John Bunyan, English writer (b. 1628)
- September 2 – Robert Viner, Lord Mayor of London (b. 1631)
- September 6 – Robert Tufton Mason, Lord Proprietor of the Province of New Hampshire ( b. c. 1635)
- September 9 – Claude Mellan, French painter and engraver (b. 1598)
- September 13 – Sir John Bright, 1st Baronet, English politician (b. 1619)
- September 15 – Otto Wilhelm Königsmarck, German-Swedish Nobleman (b. 1639)
- September 20 – Queen Jangnyeol, Korean royal consort (b. 1624)
- November 26 – Jacques Goulet, early pioneer in New France (now Québec) (b. 1615)
- October 4
  - Philips Koninck, Dutch painter (b. 1619)
  - Roger Pepys, English lawyer and politician (b. 1617)
- October 6 – Christopher Monck, 2nd Duke of Albemarle, English statesman (b. 1653)
- October 9 – Claude Perrault, French architect (b. 1613)
- October 14 – Joachim von Sandrart, German Baroque art-historian and painter (b. 1606)
- October 23 – Charles du Fresne, sieur du Cange, French philologist (b. 1610)
- November 26 – Philippe Quinault, French dramatist (b. 1635)
- November 29 – Bohuslav Balbín, Czech writer and Jesuit (b. 1621)
- December 4 – Sir Edward Seymour, 3rd Baronet, Member of Parliament (b. 1610)
- December 8 – Thomas Flatman, British artist (b. 1635)
- December 15 – Gaspar Fagel, Dutch statesman (b. 1634)
- December 15 – Louis Victor de Rochechouart de Mortemart, French military man, brother of Madame de Montespan (b. 1636)
