= François d'Alesso d'Éragny =

French soldier

François d'Alesso, Marquis d'Éragny

Governor general of the Windward Islands
- In office 1 May 1690 – 18 August 1691
- Preceded by: Charles de Courbon de Blénac
- Succeeded by: Charles de Pechpeyrou-Comminges de Guitaut (interim); Charles de Courbon de Blénac

Personal details
- Born: 21 November 1643
- Died: 18 August 1691 (aged 47)
- Occupation: Soldier

François d'Alesso, Marquis d'Éragny (21 November 1643 – 18 August 1691) was a French soldier who was briefly governor general of the French Antilles.

== Early years ==
François d'Alesso d'Éragny was born on 21 November 1643. He was descended from Jean d'Alesso (1513–72), first known seigneur of Éragny, Val-d'Oise, treasurer of the constable Anne de Montmorency (1492–1567) and adviser of King Charles IX of France (1550–74). His parents were François d'Alesso d'Éragny (died 1645) and Denise Berruyer (c. 1624–1699). On 20 April 1681 he married Bénédicte Durand de Villeblain (c. 1656–1742). They had a son, Alexandre Claude François d'Alesso d'Éragny (1688–1721).

François d'Alesso d'Éragny became a captain of the guards regiment. An embassy from Siam led by Ok-khun Chamnan was dispatched to Louis XIV and Pope Innocent XI by the Siamese King Narai in 1688. The Siamese mission was accompanied by the Jesuit Father Guy Tachard and the French envoy extraordinary to Siam, Simon de la Loubère. In February 1689, the embassy was granted an audience with Louis XIV, and the treaty of commerce Claude Céberet du Boullay had obtained in 1687 was ratified. Two weeks later a military treaty was signed that designated d'Eragny as captain of the palace guard in Ayutthaya and inspector of French troops in Siam.

== Martinique ==
During the Nine Years' War (1688–97) the governor general of the Windward Islands Charles de Courbon de Blénac resigned on 29 January 1690 after criticism of his lack of response to the English attacks on Saint Barthelemy, Marie-Galante and Saint Martin, and returned to France to defend himself at court. D'Éragny was appointed his successor in May 1690, but the marquis de Seignelay did not treat his departure as a matter of urgency. He told d'Eragny that Antilles-bound merchantmen would not receive escorts until the European campaign was over. He assigned one 36-gun frigate to d'Eragny, with one en flûte transport and 300 soldiers. The first attempt to sail was driven back to France, and he finally left in mid-December 1690 escorting eight merchant vessels.

In January 1691 a Spanish fleet landed 2,600 men at Cap‑Français on Saint-Domingue (now Haiti), joined by 700 men who had made their way from the Spanish part of the island on foot. They met the French defenders at Limonade, east of Le Cap, killed the governor Pierre-Paul Tarin de Cussy^{(fr)} and 400–500 men, burned the town, massacred the men and took the women, children and slaves. Louis Phélypeaux, comte de Pontchartrain had just taken charge of the ministry of marine when the news reached France. He at once appointed Jean-Baptiste du Casse to replace du Cussy, and dispatched him with the 48-gun Solide, 40-gun Cheval Marin and 36-gun Émerillon. D'Eragny was ordered to give du Casse whatever help he needed.

D'Eragny arrived in Martinique on 5 February 1691 with 14 ships and began to strengthen the defenses. The French in Guadeloupe had been driven into Fort Saint-Charles^{(fr)} and were besieged there by the English. When du Casse reached Martinique in May 1691 his ships forced the English to pull out of Guadeloupe. He stayed in the Windward Islands to consult with d'Eragny until an outbreak of yellow fever led him to depart.

== Death and legacy ==
D'Eragny was among the victims of the yellow fever. He died on 18 August 1691 in Fort Royal, Martinique, at the age of 47. He is buried in the choir of the Fort-de-France Cathedral. His widow remained on the island with their only son Alexandre François. In 1711 Alexandre François d'Alesso d'Éragny married Catherine Pocquet, daughter of an important settler of Basse-Pointe, captain of militia and member of the sovereign council of Martinique. The family became major landowners in Martinique. His descendant Claire de Duras (1777–1828) was the heiress to an immense fortune in Martinique, where she took refuge with her mother (née d’Alesso d’Éragny) during the French Revolution. Her mother owned sugar and cotton plantations, and slaves to work them. Claire was married to Amédée de Durfort, Duke of Duras, and became a successful novelist during the Bourbon Restoration, with work that explores questions of racial and sexual equality.

== Sources ==
- Archéologie & histoire d'Éragny-sur-Oise (in French), Conseil départemental du Val d'Oise, archived from the original on 2018-09-03
- Comba, François (3 November 2013), "Une Duras avant l'autre : la duchesse", profondeurdechamps.com
- Garric, Alain, "François D'ALESSO D'ERAGNY III", Geneanet (in French)
- Marley, David (2005), Historic Cities of the Americas: An Illustrated Encyclopedia, ABC-CLIO, ISBN 978-1-57607-027-7
- Marry, Brigitte; Suvelor, Roland (1 November 1998), "Habitation La Frégate", Maisons des îles MARTINIQUE, archived from the original on 2019-12-16
- Miller, Christopher L. (2008-01-11), The French Atlantic Triangle: Literature and Culture of the Slave Trade, Duke University Press, ISBN 978-0-8223-4151-2
- Plasse, Florent (September 1996), "La famille d'ALESSO et l'habitation "Frégate"", G.H.C. Bulletin (in French) (85)
- Pritchard, Pritchard, James S. (2004-01-22), In Search of Empire: The French in the Americas, 1670-1730, Cambridge University Press, ISBN 978-0-521-82742-3
- Tachard, Guy (1999), A Siamese Embassy Lost in Africa, 1686: The Odyssey of Ok-khun Chamnan, Silkworm Books, ISBN 978-974-7100-95-2
