= Ok-khun Chamnan =

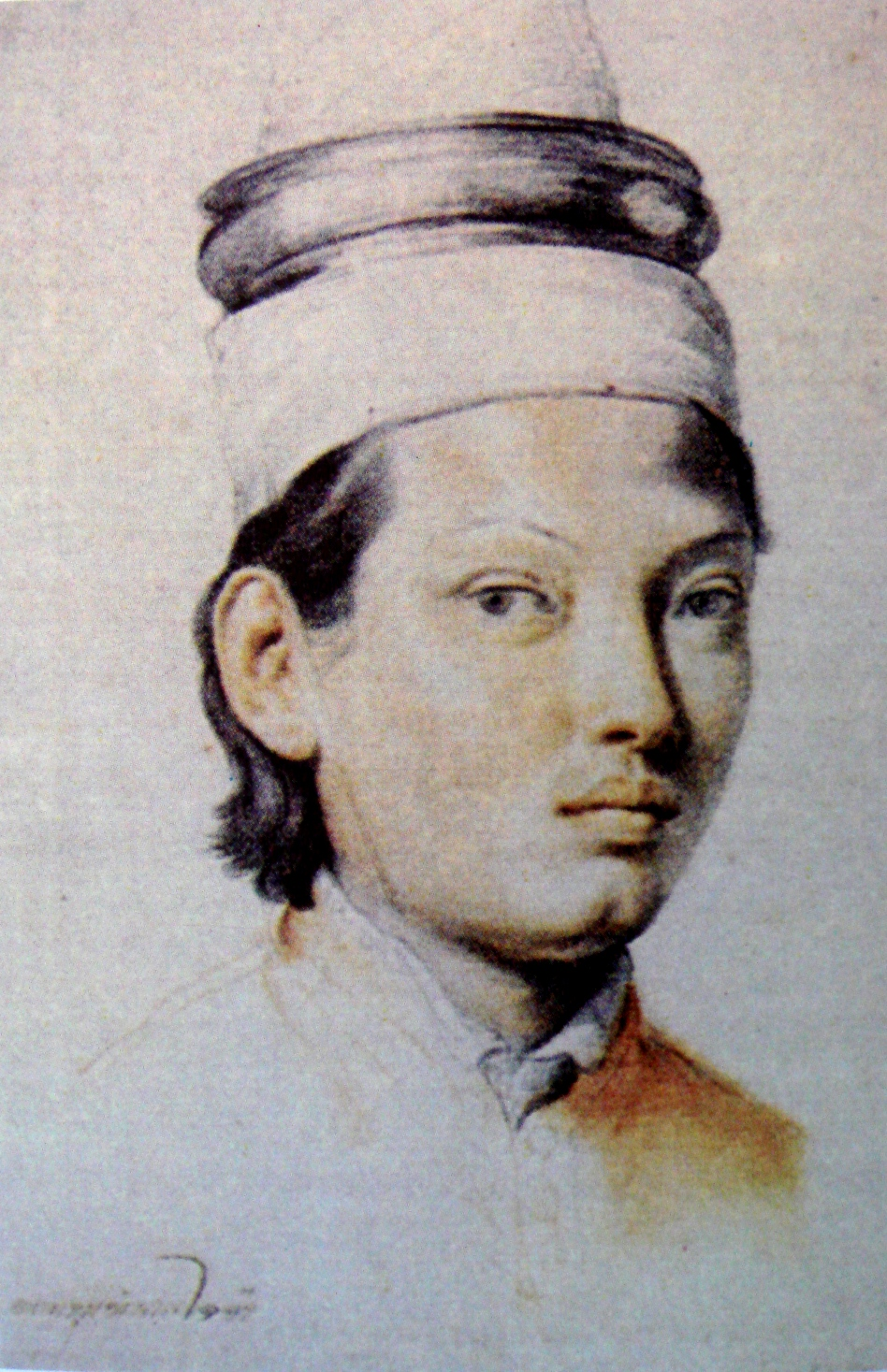
Ok-khun Chamnan in 1689, drawn by Carlo Maratta.

Ok-khun Chamnan Chaichong (Thai: ออกขุนชำนาญใจจง) was a Siamese diplomat who visited France and Rome on an embassy in 1688. He was preceded by the embassy of Kosa Pan in 1686.

== Failed embassy to Portugal (1684) ==
Ok-khun Chamnan was a member of a first embassy to Portugal, which left Siam in March 1684. The Siamese embassy was accompanying a returning Portuguese embassy, which had been sent to Siam by king Pedro II. The embassy was also bearing presents for the King of France, Louis XIV, and was planning to send three ambassadors to visit him.

The first leg of the trip was made on a Siamese ship, commanded by a Portuguese captain. In Goa, after waiting more than a year, the embassy sailed on a Portuguese ship, which was wrecked off Cape Agulhas on 27 April 1686. After a series of adventures, Chamnan made his way across the tip of Africa to join the Dutch colony at the Cape of Good Hope. After several months, the embassy returned east through Batavia and returned to Siam in September 1687.

During his travels, Chamnan had learnt Portuguese, which predisposed him to further contacts with Western countries. Chamnan was present in Bangkok in October during the reception of the 1687 French embassy composed of five warships, led by Simon de la Loubère and Claude Céberet du Boullay, director of the French East India Company.

== Embassy to France and Rome (1688) ==
Ok-khun Chamnan was then a member of a mission of three Siamese mandarins dispatched to Louis XIV in France and Pope Innocent XI in Rome, by the Siamese King Narai in 1688. The two other envoys were Ok-khun Wiset Puban and Ok-muen Pipith Raja. They were followed three days later by three catechists from Tonkin, and five Siamese students sent to study at the Collège Louis-le-Grand in Paris.

The Siamese mission was accompanied by the Jesuit Father Guy Tachard and the French envoy extraordinary to Siam, Simon de la Loubère. They left Siam aboard the Gaillard on 3 January 1688.

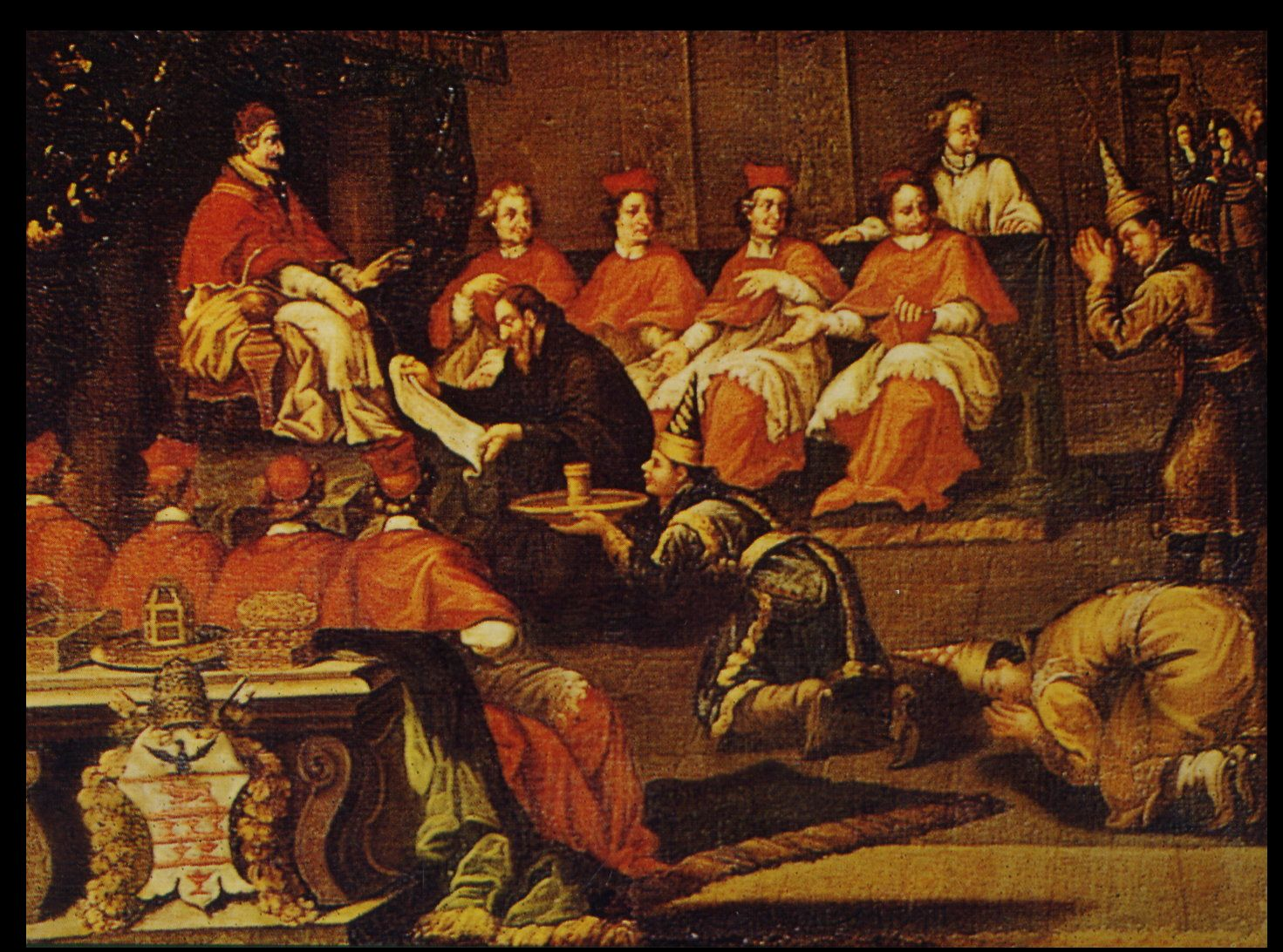
The Siamese embassy, with Father Guy Tachard meeting with Pope Innocent XI, 23 December 1688

After a first visit to Paris, during which they could not meet Louis XIV, they went to Rome. They met with the Pope on 23 December 1688, and again on 5 January 1689, for a farewell audience. Drawings of the Siamese envoys were made by the famous painter Carlo Maratta.

In February 1689, the embassy was granted an audience with Louis XIV, and the treaty of commerce Céberet had obtained in 1687 was ratified. Two weeks later a military treaty was signed, designating François d'Alesso, Marquis d'Eragny, as captain of the palace guard in Ayutthaya and inspector of French troops in Siam. During Chamnan’s time in Europe, he had also converted to Catholicism.

The embassy was returned to Siam by the six warship fleet of Abraham Duquesne-Guiton (nephew of the famous Abraham Duquesne) in 1690, but because of unfavourable winds the fleet was only able to go as far as Balassor, at the mouth of the Ganges, where they dropped the embassy. The embassy finally returned to Ayutthaya overland.

== See also ==
- France-Thailand relations
