= Éragny =

Éragny may refer to:

== Places ==
- Éragny-sur-Epte, a commune in the Oise département
- Éragny-sur-Oise, a commune in the Val-d'Oise département

== People ==
- François d'Alesso d'Éragny (1643–1691), French soldier, governor general of the French Antilles
