= Tachard =

Tachard is a French surname. Notable people with the surname include:

- Guy Tachard (1651–1712), French Catholic missionary and mathematician
- Emma Mackey (Emma Tachard-Mackey, born 1997), French-British actress
