= Kosa Pan =

Siamese noble and diplomat (1633–1699)

Chao Phraya Kosathibodi (Pan)
- เจ้าพระยาโกษาธิบดี (ปาน)
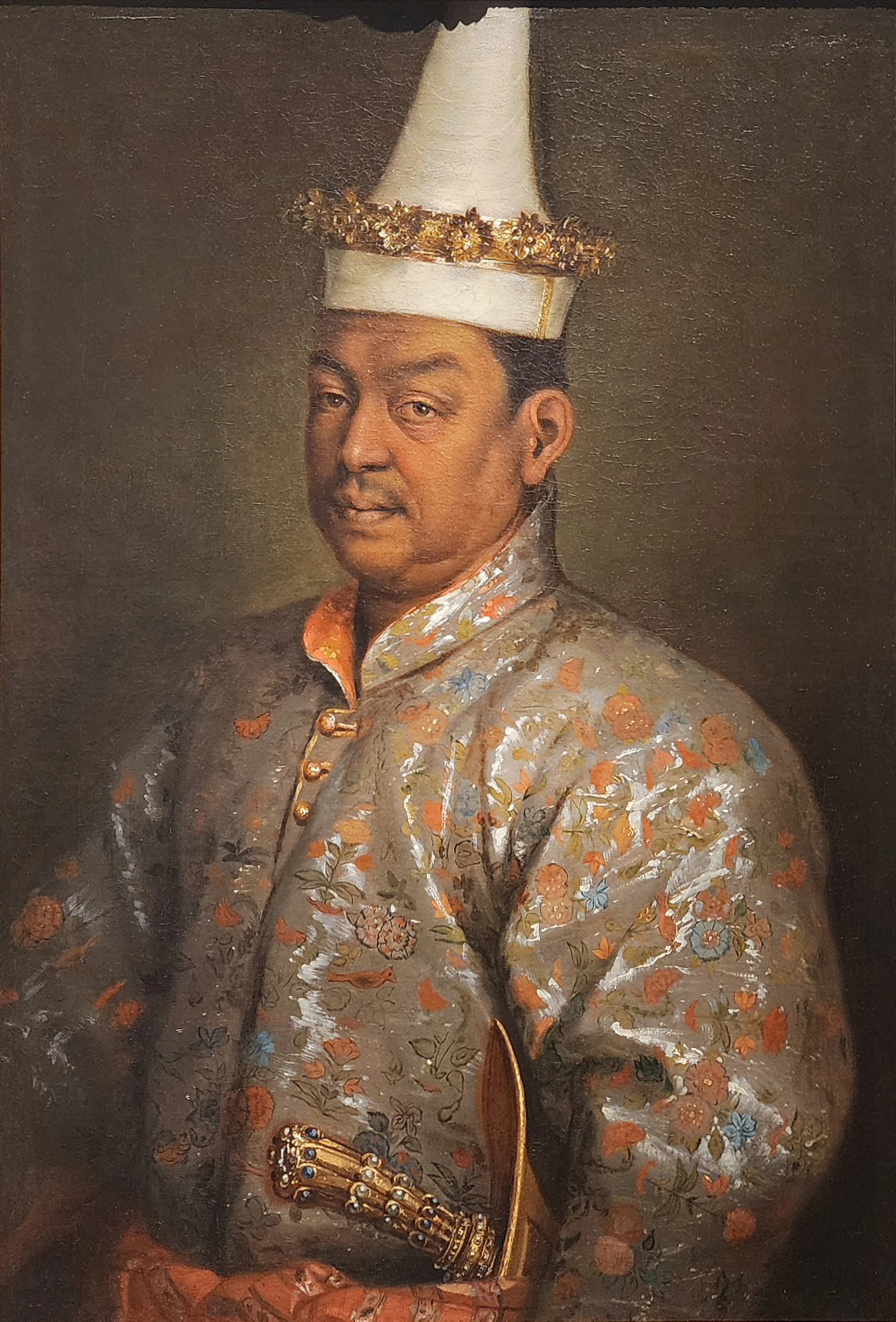
- French painting of Kosa Pan by Antoine Benoist, in 1686

Head of the Ayutthaya embassy to the French Court
- In office June 1686 – March 1687 Serving with Ok-luang Kanlaya Ratchamaitri; Ok-khun Si Wisan Wacha
- Appointed by: Narai
- Preceded by: Khun Phichai Walit; Khun Phichit Maitri
- Succeeded by: Ok-khun Chamnan Chai Chong; Ok-khun Wiset Phuban; Ok-muen Phiphit Racha

Minister of Foreign Affairs and Trade of Ayutthaya
- In office 1688–1699
- Monarch: Petracha
- Preceded by: Ok-ya Wang
- Succeeded by: Ok-ya Maha Amat

Personal details
- Born: 1633 Ayutthaya
- Died: November 15, 1699 (aged 65–66) Ayutthaya
- Parents: Phraya Kiat (father); Chao Mae Wat Dusit (mother)
- Relatives: Kosa Lek (brother); Thao Si Chulalak (sister); Rama I (great-great-grandson)
- Occupation: Diplomat, politician
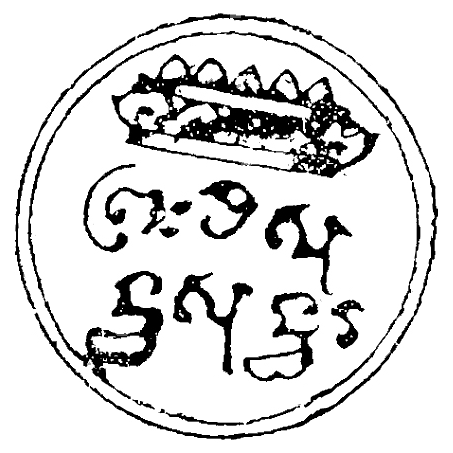
- Personal seal

Chao Phraya Kosathibodi (Thai: เจ้าพระยาโกษาธิบดี; 1633 – 15 November 1699), born Pan (Thai: ปาน), commonly known as Kosa Pan (Thai: โกษาปาน), was a prominent Siamese nobleman during the reign of King Narai of the Ayutthaya Kingdom. He is best remembered for leading the second Siamese embassy to France in 1686 He was preceded to France by the first Siamese embassy to France, which had been composed of two Siamese ambassadors and Father Bénigne Vachet, who had left Siam for France on January 5, 1684.

== Family ==
According to historian Edward van Roy, Pan was the son of Phraya Kiat, a Mon noble who sided with Naresuan during the fourth Burmese-Siamese War, and Chao Mae Wat Dusit, daughter of King Ekathotsarot and wet nurse for Phetracha and Prince Narai, both future kings of Siam. Through his son Khunthong, Pan was a great-great-grandfather of King Rama I, the founder of the Chakri dynasty. His older brother, Lek (เหล็ก), held the post of foreign minister before him.

== Early life ==
Pan was born in the Ayutthaya Kingdom around 1633. As his mother was a wet nurse for the young prince Narai, Pan was considered a foster brother to the future king. Chao's connection, if any, with the then-reigning Sukhothai dynasty of the Ayutthaya Kingdom is unclear, with some speculating her to be a daughter of King Ekathotsarot.

== Names ==
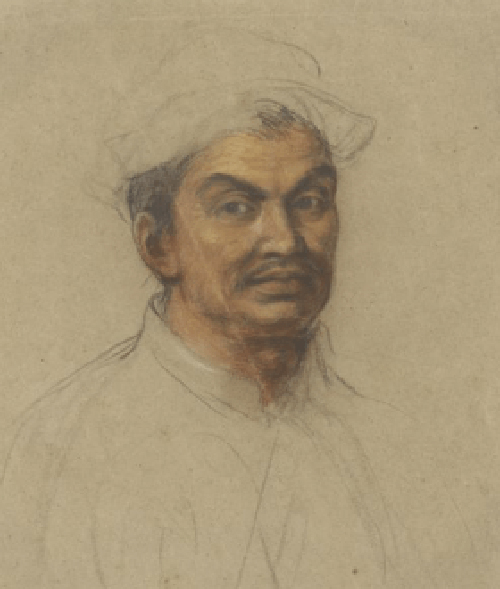
A portrait of Kosa Pan by Charles Le Brun, 1686

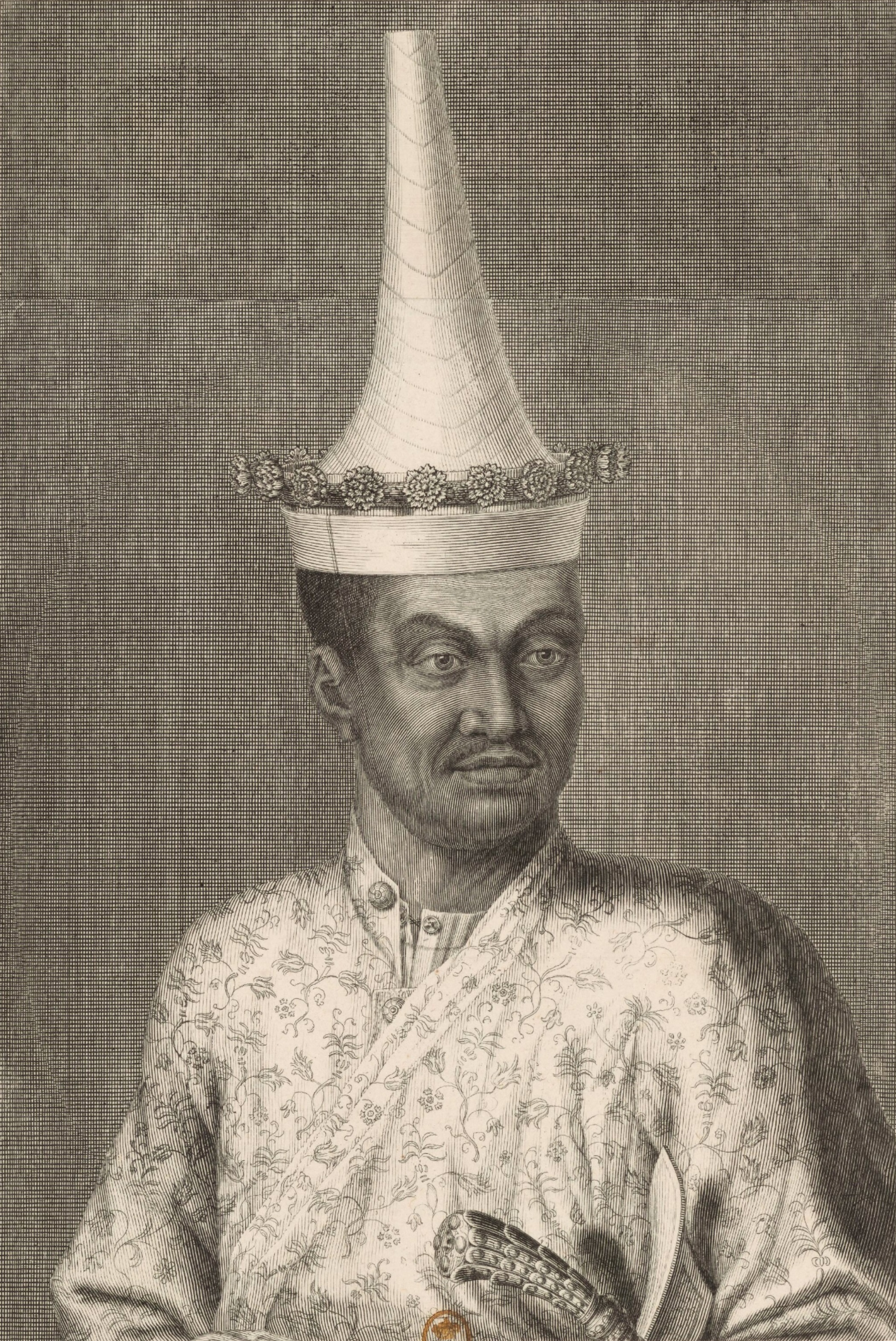
Kosa Pan Ambassador of Siam Portrait 1686

Pan (Thai: ปาน; IPA: [paːn]) was his given name. As foreign minister, he was styled Chaophraya Kosathibodi (Thai: เจ้าพระยาโกษาธิบดี; IPA: [t͡ɕâːw.pʰrá.jaː koː.sǎː.tʰí.bɔː.diː]). He is colloquially called Kosa Pan (Thai: โกษาปาน; IPA: [koː.sǎː.paːn]).

He is also known by his former style as a first-class diplomat: Ok-phra Wisut Sunthon (Thai: ออกพระวิสุทธสุนทร; IPA: [ʔɔ̀ːk.pʰrá wí.sùt sǔn.tʰɔːn]). Contemporary French documents recorded his name as Ooc, Pravisoutsonthoon Raatchathoud (ออกพระวิสุทธสุนทร ราชทูต).

His success in diplomatic negotiations earned him the epithet golden-tongued diplomat (Thai: ราชทูตลิ้นทอง or นักการทูตลิ้นทอง).

== Embassy to France (1686) ==
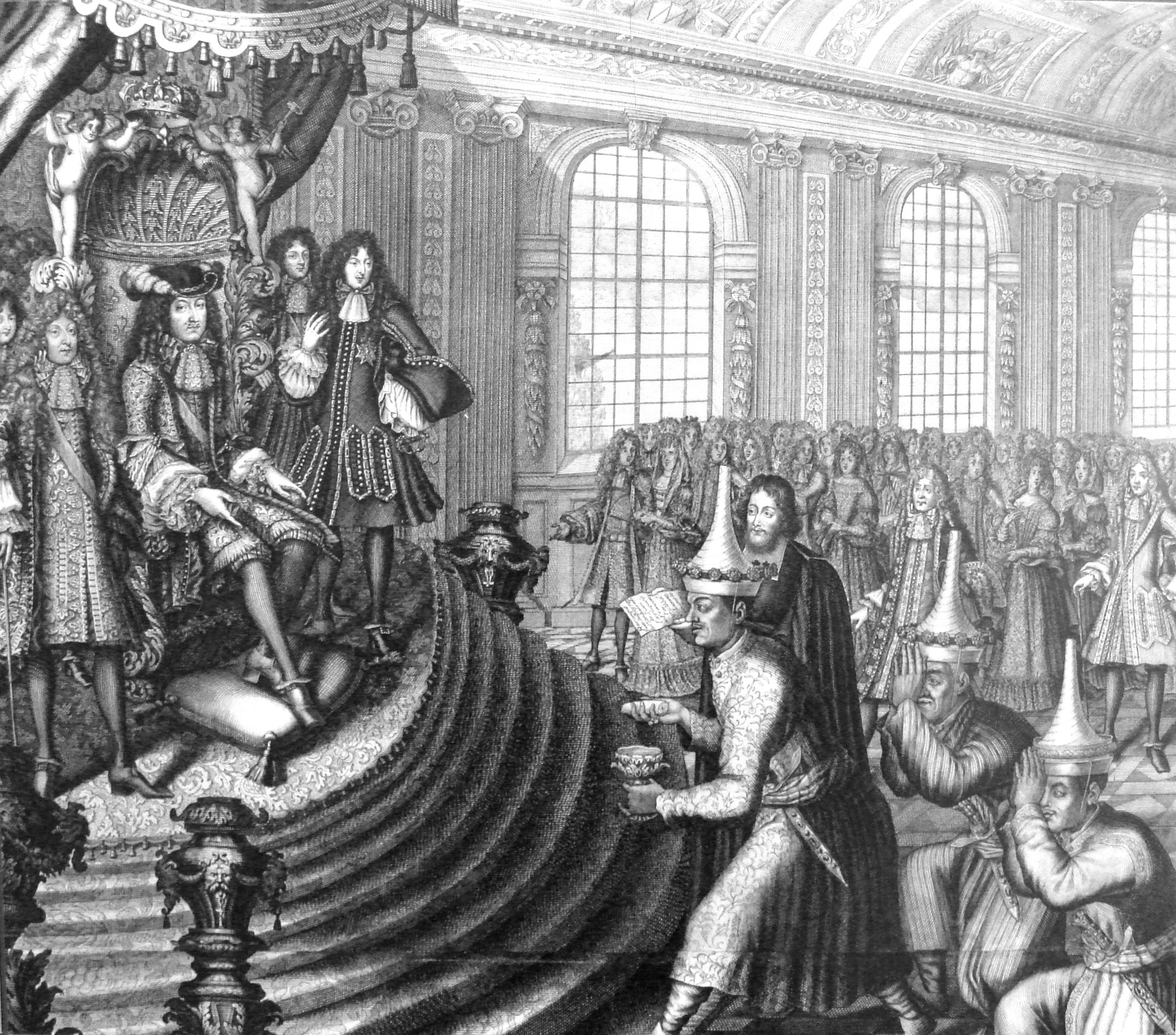
Siamese embassy to Louis XIV led by Pan in 1686, by Nicolas Larmessin

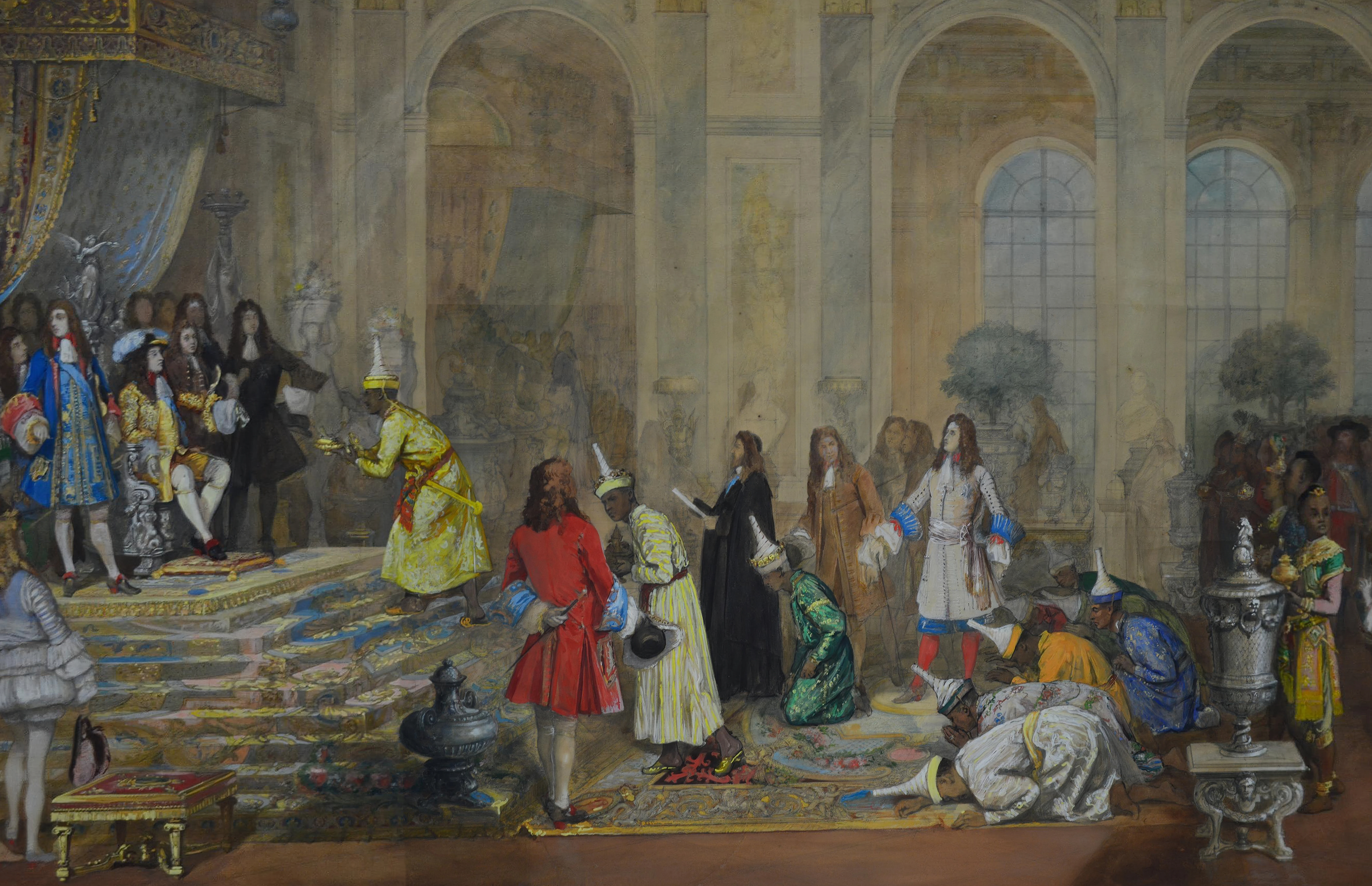
Ambassador Pan and Siamese envoys pay their respect to Louis XIV at his court in Versailles.

To accompany the return of the 1685 French embassy to Siam of Chevalier de Chaumont and François-Timoléon de Choisy, Pan was selected by Constantine Phaulkon, the Prime Counsellor to King Narai, to lead an embassy to France. Pan set out for France in 1686 on two French ships with two other Siamese ambassadors, Ok-luang Kanlaya Ratchamaitri and Ok-khun Si Wisan Wacha, and by the Jesuit Father Guy Tachard.

The embassy was bringing a proposal for an eternal alliance between France and Siam. Pan's embassy was met with a rapturous reception and caused a sensation in the courts and society of Europe. The mission landed at Brest, France and journeyed to Versailles, constantly surrounded by crowds of curious onlookers. The embassy stayed in France from June 1686 to March 1687.

King Louis XIV spoke of Pan in a royal letter to King Narai:

Your ambassador is a person of great prudence, who has fulfilled his duties most thoroughly. It would be unjust if we did not seize this opportunity to commend his merits; he has conducted himself entirely to our satisfaction, and every word he spoke was delightful and highly credible.

— Letter from King Louis XIV to King Narai, c. 1687.

== 1688 Siamese revolution ==
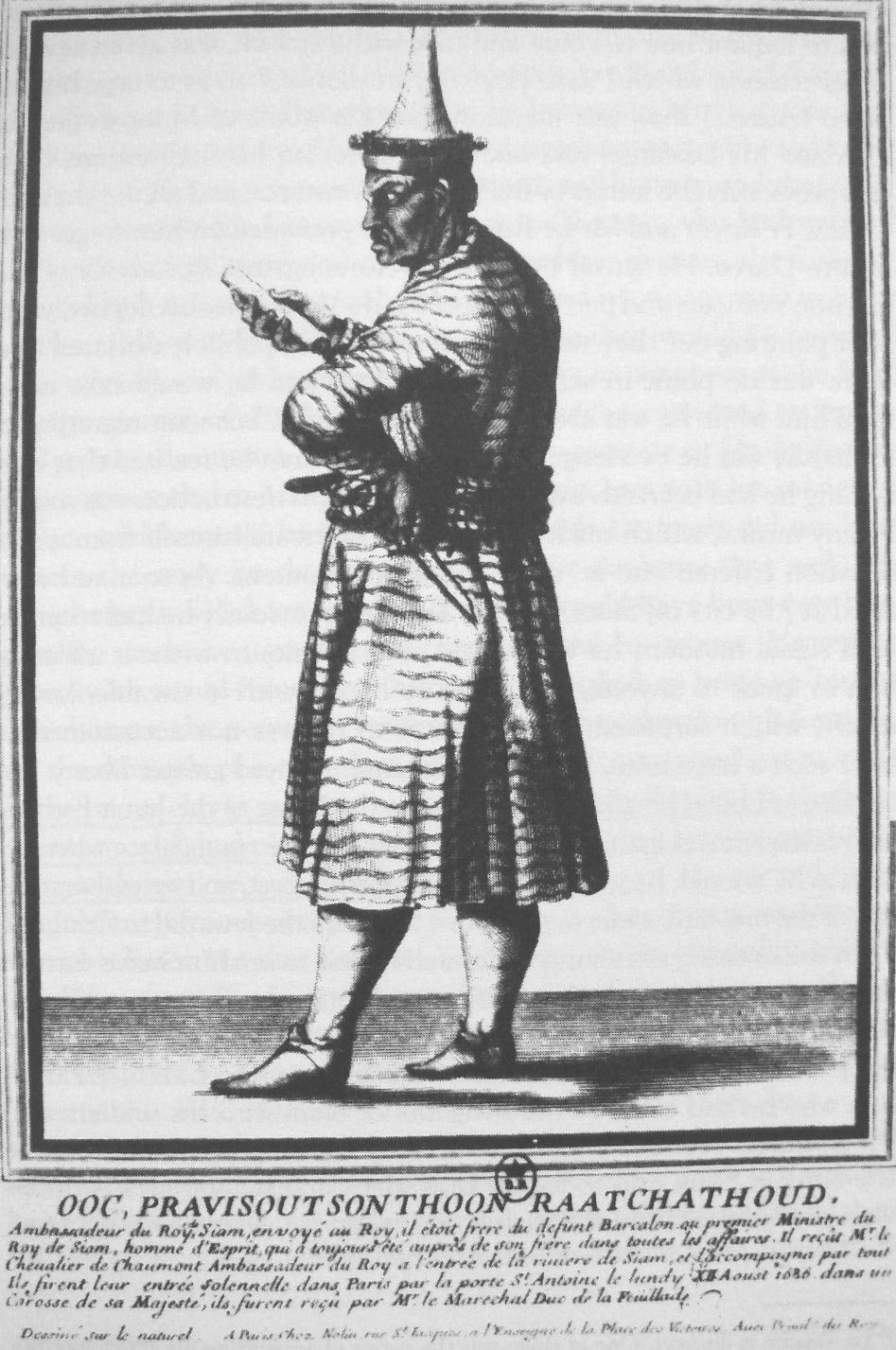
Pan, sketched in France (1686)

Upon his return to Siam, Pan was pressured to become a supporter of Phetracha's anti-French faction of dissatisfied nobles, who resented the power that the French held in Siam. The following revolution toppled Narai and ousted the French forces. Pan was sent to negotiate with their officials. He was appointed by Phetracha as his Minister of Foreign Affairs and Trade.

Pan was met in Siam in 1690 by the German naturalist Engelbert Kaempfer. The naturalist noted "pictures of the Royal family of France and European maps" hanging "in the hall of his [Pan's] house":

"He is a more comely Person, and of better aspect, than I ever met amongst this black race of mankind... He is also quick of understanding and lively action, for which reasons he was a few years ago sent Ambassador to France, of which Country, its Government, Fortresses and the like, he would often entertain us in his discourses; and the hall of his House, where we had a private audience of him, was hung with the pictures of the Royal Family of France, and European Maps, the rest of his furniture being nothing but Dust and Cobwebs.

— Engelbert Kaempfer (1727/1987:38).

In 1699, Pan and Phetracha received a visit from the Jesuit Father Guy Tachard. The meeting was formal and did not produce any closer relations.

== Death ==
Pan was later accused of having affinity to the French and loyalty to his former King, Narai. He was disgraced, and King Phetracha ordered his nose cut off. He reportedly committed suicide on 15 November 1699, according to the Dutch. His duties were taken over by Okya Maha Amath, one of the King's favorites. Pan is said to be the direct ancestor of King Rama I, founder of the present ruling dynasty of Thailand.

== Legacy ==
The legacy of Kosa Pan is documented through his diplomatic contributions, his genealogical links to the Thai monarchy, and several physical memorials in both France and Thailand.

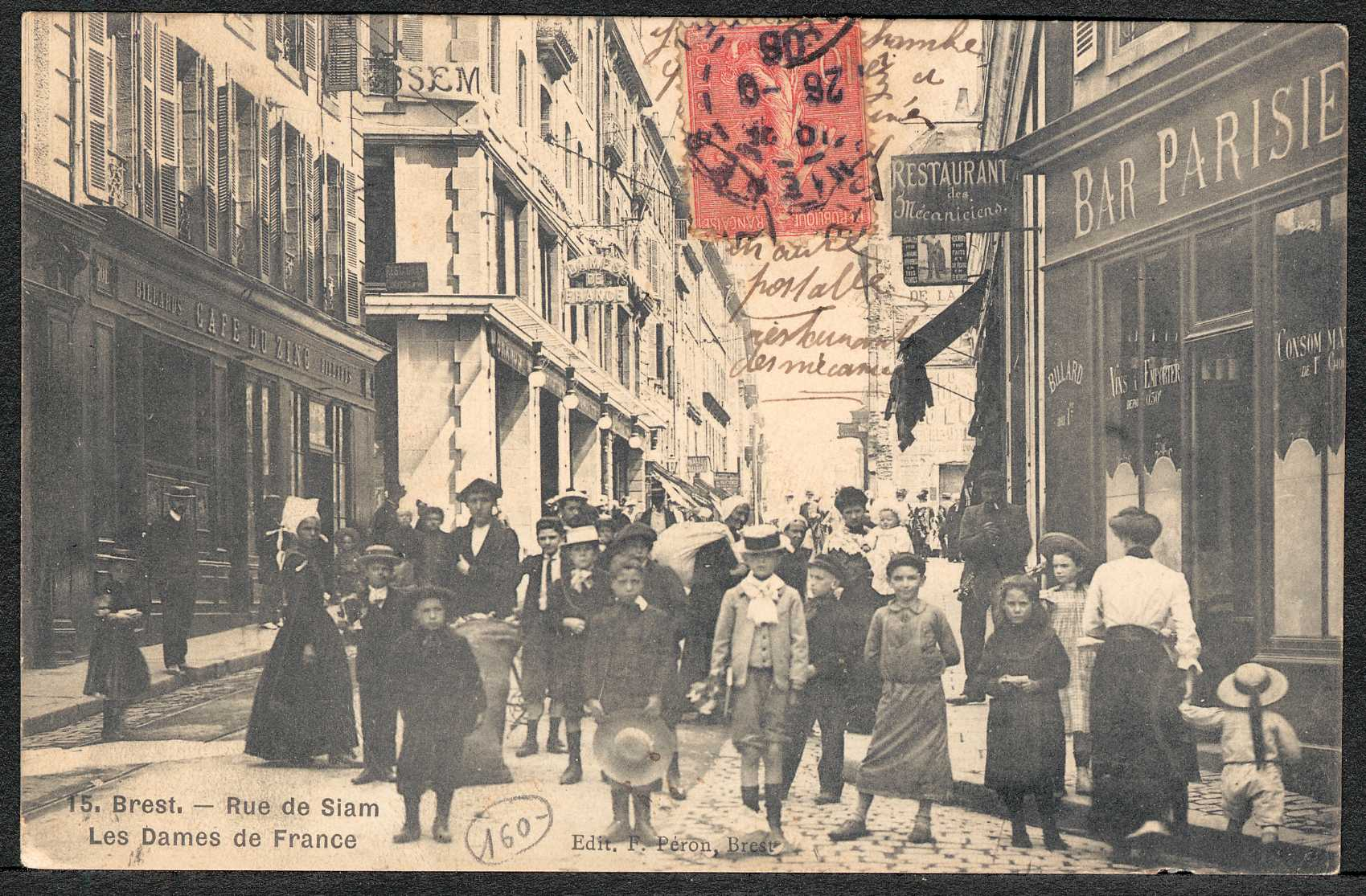
Rue de Siam in Brest, France (early 20th-century postcard). The street was named in honor of the Siamese embassy led by Kosa Pan, which arrived in 1686.

One of the most enduring legacies of the 1686 Siamese embassy is the naming of Rue de Siam (Street of Siam) in the French port city of Brest. Memorials to Kosa Pan include a bronze bust inaugurated in February 2020 at the intersection of Rue de Siam and Rue Louis Pasteur in Brest. This monument replaced an earlier commemorative plaque installed in 1986 for the 300th anniversary of the embassy. The journals and memoirs attributed to Kosa Pan, particularly those documenting his observations of the Court of Versailles, serve as significant primary sources for historians. These records provide a rare contemporary Southeast Asian perspective on early modern Europe.

== See also ==
- France-Thailand relations
