= Claude de Visdelou =

French Jesuit missionary (1656–1737)

Claude de Visdelou (12 August 1656 – 11 November 1737) was a French Jesuit missionary.

== Life ==
De Visdelou was born at the Château de Bienassis, Erquy, Brittany. He entered the Society of Jesus on 5 September 1673, and was one of the missionaries sent to China by Louis XIV in 1687. He travelled with a group of Jesuit mathematicians and scientists including Jean de Fontaney, Joachim Bouvet, Louis Le Comte, Guy Tachard and Jean-François Gerbillon.

He acquired a wide knowledge of the Chinese language and literature. Other learned Jesuits considered that he gave too much credit to contemporary Chinese commentators, who had their own interpretations on the works of the ancient Chinese sages.

When the papal legate Charles-Thomas Maillard De Tournon came to China in 1705, chiefly to regulate the question of the Chinese Rites, Visdelou was the only Jesuit favourable to their prohibition. Tournon appointed him Vicar Apostolic of Guizhou with the title of bishop of Claudiopolis in Isauria, but his superiors opposed the nomination, since Visdelou had not received papal dispensation from his vow not to accept ecclesiastical dignity.

With the missionaries who had submitted to the decree against the rites, Visdelou followed the legate to Macau, where he was secretly consecrated bishop on 2 February 1709. He then set out for Pondicherry where he arrived, 25 June 1709; he remained there in great retirement in the house of the French Capuchins until his death at Pondicherry.

== Works ==
Visdelou took with him over 500 volumes in Chinese and almost his sole occupation consisted in working on these. He sent to Rome several writings on the questions of the rites. The sinologist James Legge, says he "was in the habit of writing extravagantly about the Chinese and caricaturing their sentiments" ("Notions of the Chinese concerning God and the spirit", Hong Kong, 1852, 10). Some of his cited work deal with the history of the Tartars. He collected from Chinese historians documents on the peoples of Central Asia and Eastern Asia: Huns, Tatars, Mongols, and Turks.

His researches on this subject were first published as supplement to Herbelot's Bibliothèque orientale (1779). Geographer Jean Baptiste Bourguignon d'Anville writes that Visdelou had sent his manuscripts on the Tatars to academic Jean-Roland Malet, who died in 1736 (Memoire de M. d'Anville sur la Chine, 1776, 33).

=== Publications ===
His books include;

- Bibliotheque Orientale, ou Dictionnaire Universel contenant tout ce qui fait connoître les peuples de l'Orient (with Antoine Galand). Published by J. Neaulme; Nicolas van Daalen, A la Haye [The Hague].
- Les Livres Sacrés de l'Orient, Comprenant Le Chou-King Ou Le Livre, published by Hachette Livre Bnf.
- Les Livres Sacrés de Toutes Les Religions Sauf La Bible, Published by Hachette Livre Bnf.

== Notes ==
- Norbert, Oraison funebre de N. de Visdelou, Jesuite, evêque de Claudiopolis, Vicaire Apostolique en Chine et aux Indes, etc. in Memoires historiques ... sur les missiones orientales, III (Lucca, 1745), pp. 343–460
- Augustin de Backer - Carlos Sommervogel, Bibliothèque, VIII, pp. 838-843.
