= Jean-François Gerbillon =

French missionary who worked in China

Jean-François Gerbillon (4 June 1654, Verdun, France – 27 March 1707, Peking, China) was a French Catholic missionary who worked in China.

== Biography ==
Gerbillon entered the Society of Jesus in 1670. After completing the usual course of study, he taught grammar and humanities for seven years. In 1685, he was among the Jesuits chosen to found the French mission in China. For the first leg of the trip, he was attached to the embassy of the Chevalier de Chaumont to Siam, and was accompanied by a group of Jesuit mathematicians (Jean de Fontaney (1643–1710), Joachim Bouvet (1656–1730), Louis Le Comte (1655–1728), Guy Tachard (1648–1712) and Claude de Visdelou (1656–1737)). Tachard remained in Siam beside King Narai, but the others reached China in 1687.

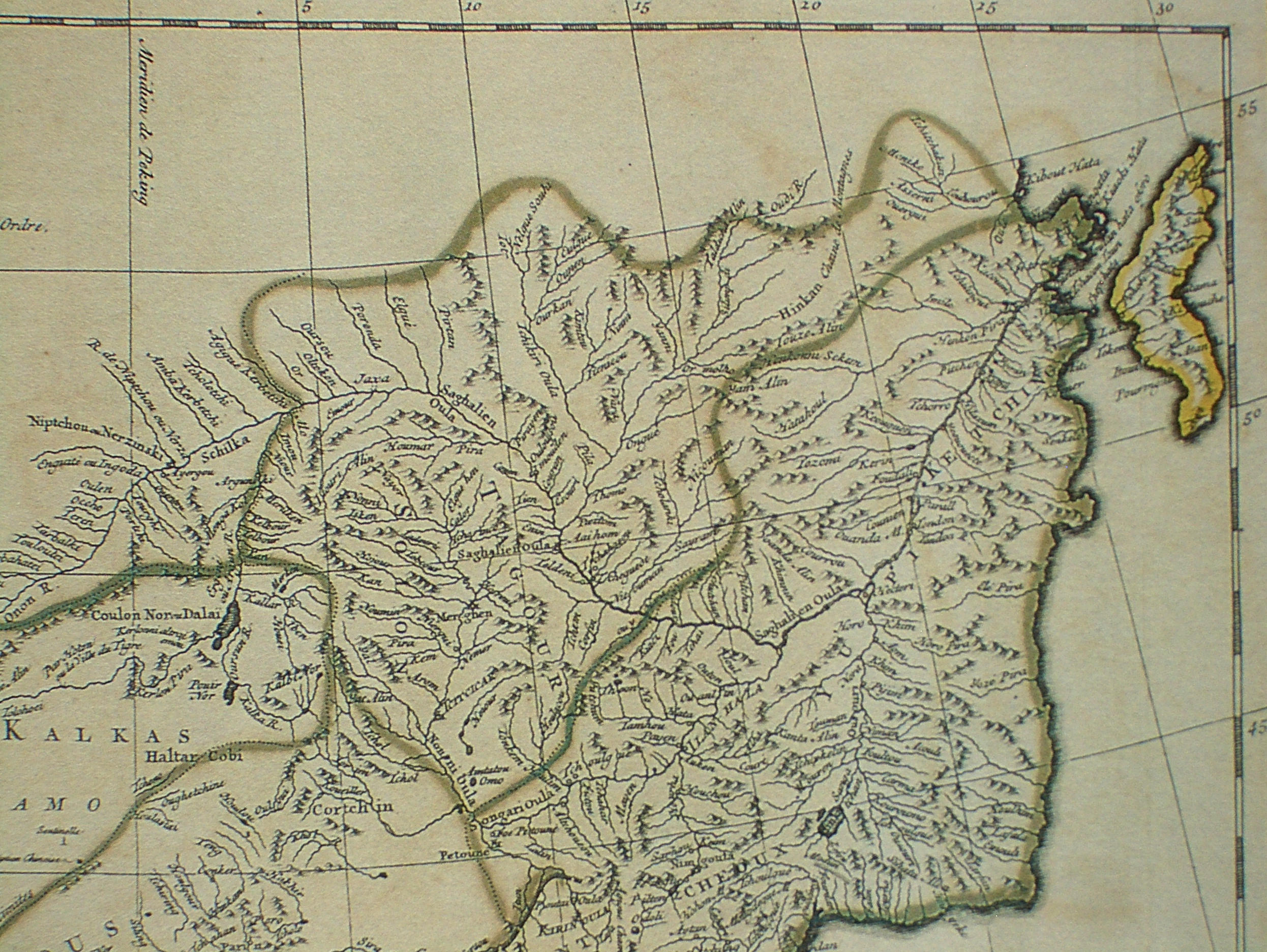
The location of Nerchinsk on this 17th-century d'Anville's map may be due to Gerbillon's observation

Upon their arrival in Beijing, they were received by the Kangxi Emperor, who was interested in their scientific knowledge and retained Gerbillion and Joachim Bouvet at the court. As soon as they had learned the language of the country, Gerbillion with Thomas Pereira, one of his companions, was sent as interpreter to Nerchinsk in Russia. They travelled with the ambassadors commissioned to negotiate with the Russians regarding the boundaries of the two empires, which were determined in the Treaty of Nerchinsk (1689).

The emperor was impressed by Gerbillon's abilities as a scientist and diplomat, and thereafter Gerbillon frequently travelled in his suite. Gerbillon made eight different journeys into "Tartary" (i.e., Manchuria and Mongolia). On one of these he was an eyewitness to the campaign in which Kangxi defeated the Oirats. On his last journey he accompanied the three commissioners who regulated public affairs and established new laws among the Khalkha Mongols, who had yielded allegiance to the emperor. He availed himself of this opportunity to determine the latitude and longitude of a number of places in what is today the Northeastern China and adjacent areas of Russia and Mongolia.

Gerbillion was for a time, in charge of the French college in Beijing; he later became superior-general of the mission. In 1692, he obtained an edict granting the free exercise of the Christian religion. After the emperor's recovery from a fever, during which he was attended by Gerbillion and Bouvet, he showed his gratitude by bestowing on them a site for a chapel and residence.

Gerbillon later discussed the Chinese Rites controversy with Charles-Thomas Maillard de Tournon, the first papal legate sent to Peking; the fall-out from this issue led to the Emperor withdrawing his support for Christianity.

== Works ==
Gerbillon's account of his travels in Tatary details the topography, local customs, and his life at court. His writings also document foreign fauna, and have since been used as a reference for natural history and even veterinary medicine. He additionally wrote several works on mathematics.

Writings by Gerbillon include:

- Eléments de Géométrie (1689)
- Géométrie pratique et théoretique (1690)
- Eléments de philosophie
- Relations du huit Voyages dans la Grande Tartarie (1688–98)
- Observations historiques sur la grande Tartarie
- Elementa Linguæ Tartaricæ
