= Jean-Roland Malet =

French economic historian (c. 1675–1736)

Jean-Roland Malet or Mallet (c. 1675 – 12 April 1736, Paris) was a French economic historian, author of the Comptes rendus de l'administration des finances du royaume (Accounts of the financial administration of the kingdom), which constitute the most important source of economic and financial data for Ancien Régime France.

== Biography ==
Son of a master carpenter, he was commissaire-général des vivres de la marine in the département of Caen, Province of Normandy. He was also secretary of Louis XIV and trésorier général of the military pensions in 1707. He was elected a member of the Académie Française in 1714 for having written an Ode sur les glorieux succès des armes du Roy (Ode on the glorious successes of the King's armies), which won the poetry prize "in the judgement of the Messieurs of the Académie". At some point in his career, he became chief clerk to Nicolas Desmarets, Controller-General of Finances and nephew of Colbert, for whom he edited the Comptes rendus de l'administration des finances du royaume.

The full title of this work, completed around 1720 but only published in 1789 under the name Jean-Roland Mallet, was Comptes rendus de l'administration des finances du royaume de France pendant les onze dernières années du règne de Henri IV, le régne de Louis XIII et soixante cinq années de celui de Louis XIV avec des recherches sur l'origine des impôts sur les revenus et dépenses de nos rois depuis Philippe le Bel jusqu'à Louis XIV et différents mémoires sur le numéraire et sa valeur sous les trois règnes ci-dessus (Report on the administration of the finances of the kingdom of France during the last eleven years of the reign of Henri IV, the reign of Louis XIII and the sixty five years of the reign of Louis XIV with research on the origin of taxes in the revenues and dispensations of our kings from Philip IV to Louis XIV and different mémoires on the currency and its value under the three reigns listed above).

== Bibliography ==
- (in French) Jean-Roland Malet, premier historien des finances de la monarchie française, Margaret et Richard BONNEY, Comité pour l'histoire économique et financière de la France, 1993, 353 p (ISBN 2-11-087167-9).
