= Claude Céberet du Boullay =

17th-century French diplomat

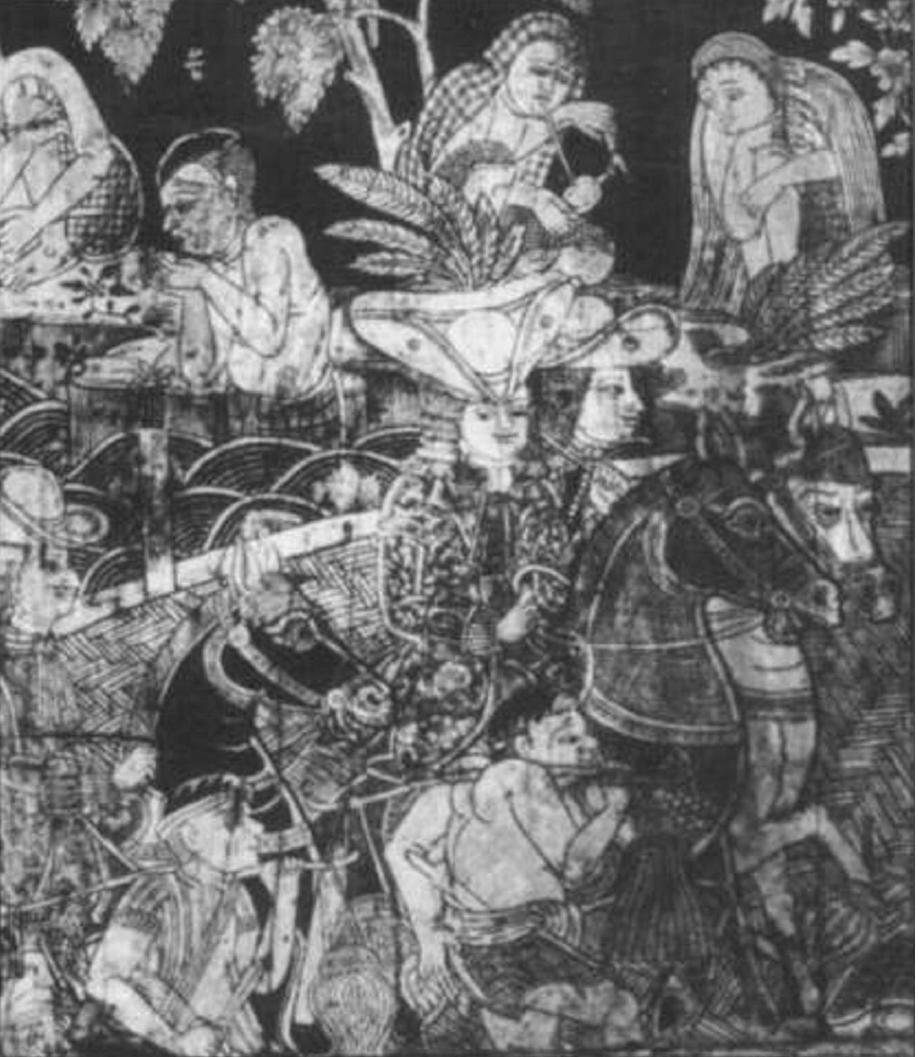
French soldiers in Siam, 17th century Siamese painting.

Claude Céberet du Boullay (1647–1702) was a 17th-century French diplomat who participated in the La Loubère-Céberet embassy as "envoy extraordinary" to the kingdom of Siam (modern Thailand) in 1687. He was co-representative of the mission with the diplomat Simon de la Loubère.

== Mission to Siam ==
In 1685, Céberet became one of the 12 Directors of the French East India Company. During the 1687 embassy to Siam, Céberet was put in charge of the commercial interests of France, and particularly those of the French East India Company. Céberet left from Brest with the embassy for Siam on 1 March 1687. The embassy sailed on board the warships L'oiseau (46 guns), Le Gaillard (52 guns), La Loire (24 guns), La Normande and Le Dromadaire.

The embassy arrived in Thailand in September and October 1687. An interview with the Siamese king Narai occurred on 2 November 1687. The mission achieved little more than the confirmation of the 1685 commercial treaty obtained by the Chevalier de Chaumont. It also seems that Père Tachard considerably interfered with the mission so as to render it useless. There were some important results on the military plane however, as the troops which had arrived with the mission occupied the cities of Bangkok and Mergui.

== Return to France ==
In December 1687, Céberet left again for France first by going overland from Ayutthaya to the harbour of Mergui. He left on 4 January 1688 on the ship President for Pondicherry, which he reached on 25 January.

While in Pondicherry, Céberet ordered the Governor of Pondicherry François Martin to send his son-in-law André Deslandes to found Company trade counters in the Bengal region. Deslandes left Pondicherry on 30 August 1688 and would found the counters of Balassor and Cassimbazar in 1689.

Back in France, after being intendant in Lorient, Céberet became intendant of Dunkirk. Claude Céberet died on 18 September 1702 and was buried in Dunkirk.

== See also ==
- France-Thailand relations

== Works ==
- Céberet, Claude Journal du Voyage de Siam
