= Louis Le Comte =

French Jesuit and mathematician

Louis le Comte (1655–1728), also Louis-Daniel Lecomte, was a French Jesuit and mathematician who participated in the 1687 French Jesuit mission to China under Jean de Fontaney. He arrived in China on 7 February 1688. He had travelled with a group of Jesuit mathematicians and scientists including Joachim Bouvet, Claude de Visdelou, Guy Tachard and Jean-François Gerbillon.

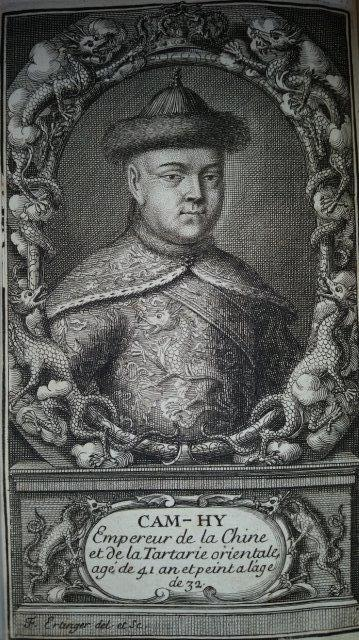
Engraving of Kangxi Emperor from le Comte's Nouveaux Memoires

He returned to France in 1691 as Procurator of the Jesuits. His Nouveau mémoire sur l'état présent de la Chine, which was published in Paris in 1696, caused great debate within the Chinese Rites Controversy.

By 1696, he had been appointed Mathematician to the King of France.

== Publications ==
His publications include;

- Nouveaux mémoires sur l'état présent de la Chine (Volumes 1 and 2)
- Memoirs and Remarks Geographical, Historical, Topographical, Physical, Natural, Astronimocal, Mechanical, Military, Mercantile, Political, and Ecclesiastical, Made in above Ten Years Travels through The Empoire of China
- Un Jésuite à Pékin: Nouveaux Mémoires De L'état Présent De La Chine, 1687-1692
- A compleat history of the empire of China
- Lettre a Monseigneur Le Duc Du Mayne Sur Les Ceremonies de la Chine
- Eclaircissement sur la denonciation faite a N.S.P. le Pape, des nouveaux memoires de la Chine (s.n.], 1700) (with Charles Le Gobien)
- A Collection of voyages and travels

== See also ==
- Jesuit China missions
