= Simon de la Loubère =

French diplomat, writer and mathematician (1642–1729)

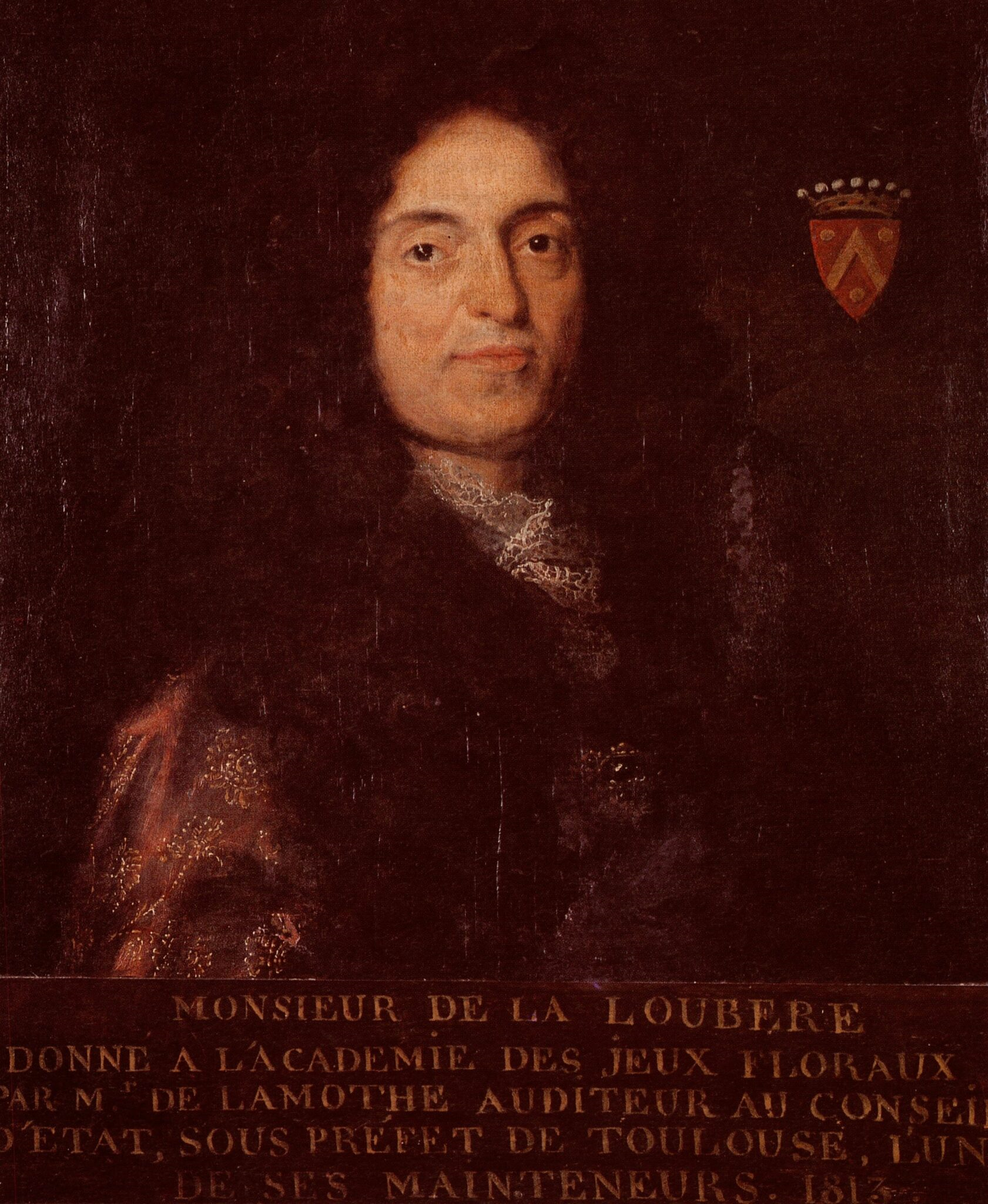
Simon de La Loubere portrait

Simon de la Loubère (French: [simɔ̃ də la lubɛʁ]; 21 April 1642 – 26 March 1729) was a French diplomat to Siam (Thailand), writer, mathematician and poet. He is credited with bringing back a document which introduced Europe to Indian astronomy, the "Siamese method" of making magic squares, and one of the earliest descriptions of parachutes.

== Mission to Siam ==
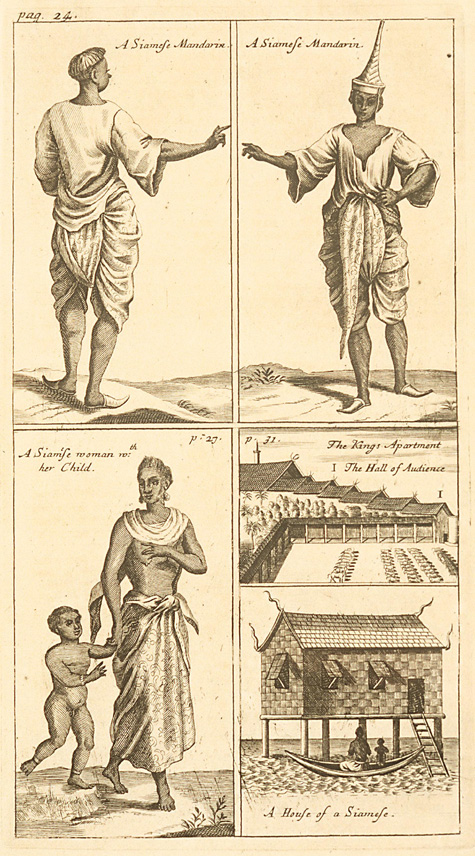
A page from Simon de La Loubère : Du Royaume de Siam. Illustration from the English edition (1693).

Simon de la Loubère led an embassy to Siam (modern Thailand) in 1687 (the "La Loubère-Céberet mission"). The embassy, composed of five warships, arrived in Bangkok in October 1687 and was received by Ok-khun Chamnan. La Loubère returned to France on board the Gaillard on 3 January 1688, accompanied by the Jesuit Guy Tachard, and a Siamese embassy led by Ok-khun Chamnan.

Upon his return, La Loubère wrote a description of his travels, as had been requested by Louis XIV, published under the title Du Royaume de Siam: "It was by the orders, which I had the honours to receive from the King upon leaving for my voyage to Siam, that I observed in that country, as exactly as possible, all that appeared to be the most singular.

Loubère also brought back with him an obscure manuscript relating to the astronomical traditions of Siam, which he passed on to the famous French-Italian astronomer Jean Dominique Cassini. The Siamese Manuscript, as it is now called, intrigued Cassini enough so that he spent a couple years deciphering its cryptic contents, determining on the way that the document originated in India. His explication of the manuscript appeared in La Loubere's book on the Kingdom of Siam in 1691, which laid the first foundation of European scholarship on Indian astronomy.

== French career ==
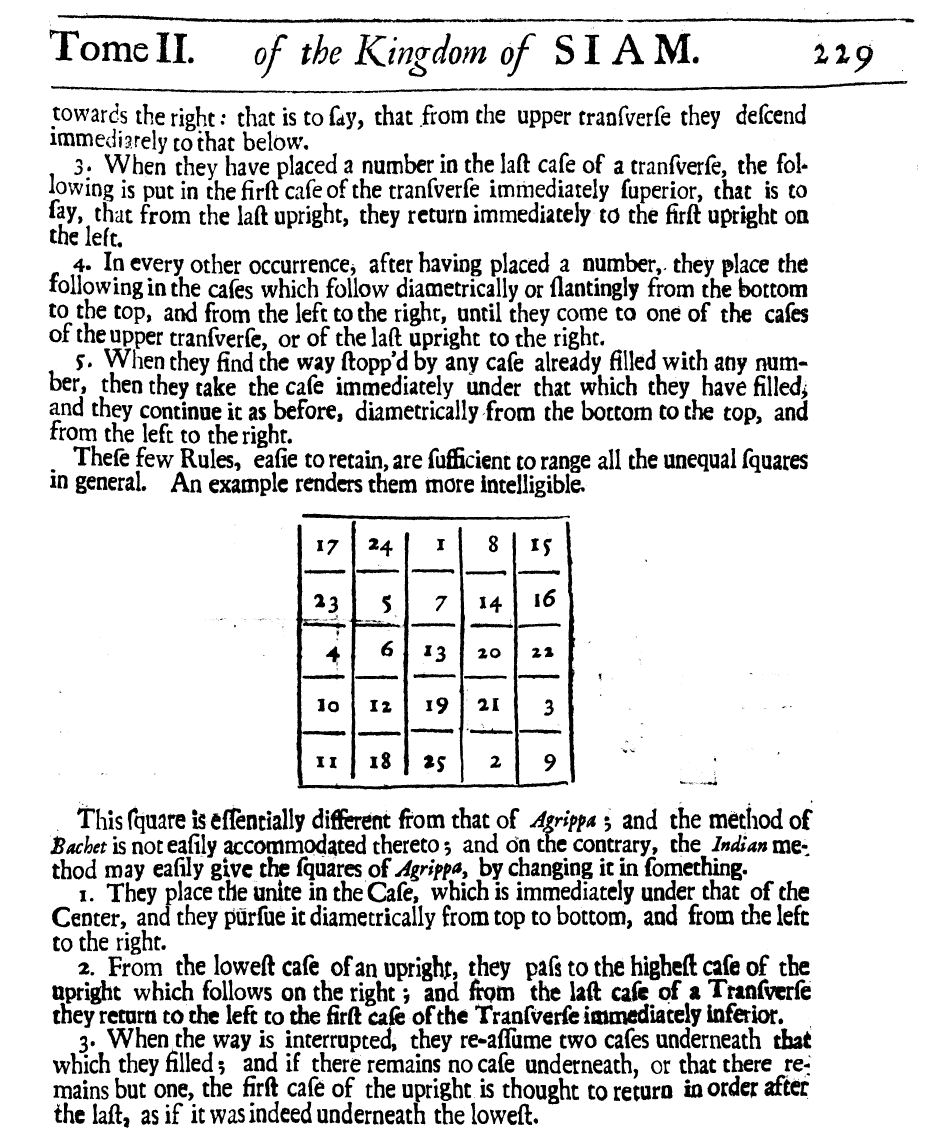
A description of the Siamese method for creating magic squares, in the English translation of Simon de la Loubère's book

La Loubère was elected member of the Académie française (1693–1729), where he received Seat 16, following the 1691 publication of his book Du Royaume de Siam.

La Loubère was a friend of the German scientist Gottfried Leibniz, and once wrote that he had "no greater joy than (to discuss) philosophy and mathematics" with him (22 January 1681 correspondence).

=== Magic square ===
La Loubère brought to France from his Siamese travels a very simple method for creating n-odd magic squares, known as the "Siamese method" or the "La Loubère method", which apparently was initially brought from Surat, India, by another Frenchman by the surname of Vincent, who was sailing on the return ship with La Loubère.

=== Siamese parachute ===
La Loubère is also famous for making one of the earliest account of a parachute following his embassy to Siam. He reported in his 1691 book that a man would jump from a high place with two large umbrellas to entertain the king of Siam, landing into trees, rooftops, and sometimes rivers.

== Works ==
- Du Royaume de Siam, 1691: Full text in French ( volume 1, volume 2) or English translation
- Traité de l'origine des jeux floraux de Toulouse (1715)
- De la Résolution des équations, ou de l'Extraction de leurs racines, 1732 Full text

== See also ==
- France-Thailand relations
