= Jean de Fontaney =

French Jesuit (1643–1710)

Jean de Fontaney (1643–1710) was a French Jesuit who led a mission to China in 1687.

== Biography ==
Jean de Fontaney was born in 1643 in Saint Pol de Léon. He was a teacher of mathematics and astronomy at the Collège de Clermont (later known as Collège Louis le Grand). He was asked by king Louis XIV to set up a mission to China, following a request by Ferdinand Verbiest, in order to spread French and Catholic influence at the Chinese court with the pretext of transmitting scientific knowledge. Jean de Fontaney assembled a group of five other Jesuits to accompany him, all highly skilled in sciences, namely Joachim Bouvet, Jean-François Gerbillon, Louis-Daniel Lecomte, Guy Tachard, and Claude de Visdelou.

Guy Tachard remained in Ayutthaya where he was to have a major role, while Jean de Fontaney led the four remaining Fathers to China, where they arrived in February 1688. Upon their arrival in Beijing they were received by the Kangxi Emperor who was favorably impressed by them and retained Jean-François Gerbillion and Joachim Bouvet at the court.

Jean de Fontaney returned to France in 1703. He became Rector of the Collège royal Henri le Grand in La Flèche until his death there in 1710.

== Publications ==
His publications include;

- Relation de ce qui s'est passe a la Chine en 1697 - 99 a l'occasion d'un etablissement que M. l'Abbe de Lyonne a fait a Nien-Tscheou, Ville de la Province de Tche-Kiang 1700
- Observations sur la comete de l'annee 1680 et 1681 faites au College de Clermont 1681
- Lettre du Père de Fontaney, supérieur des six Jésuites envoyez par le Roy à la Chine, écrite de Siam. à un autre Jésuite de ses amis, le 26 février 1686-1687

== See also ==
- Jesuit China missions
