= Alexandre, Chevalier de Chaumont =

French diplomat (1640–1710)

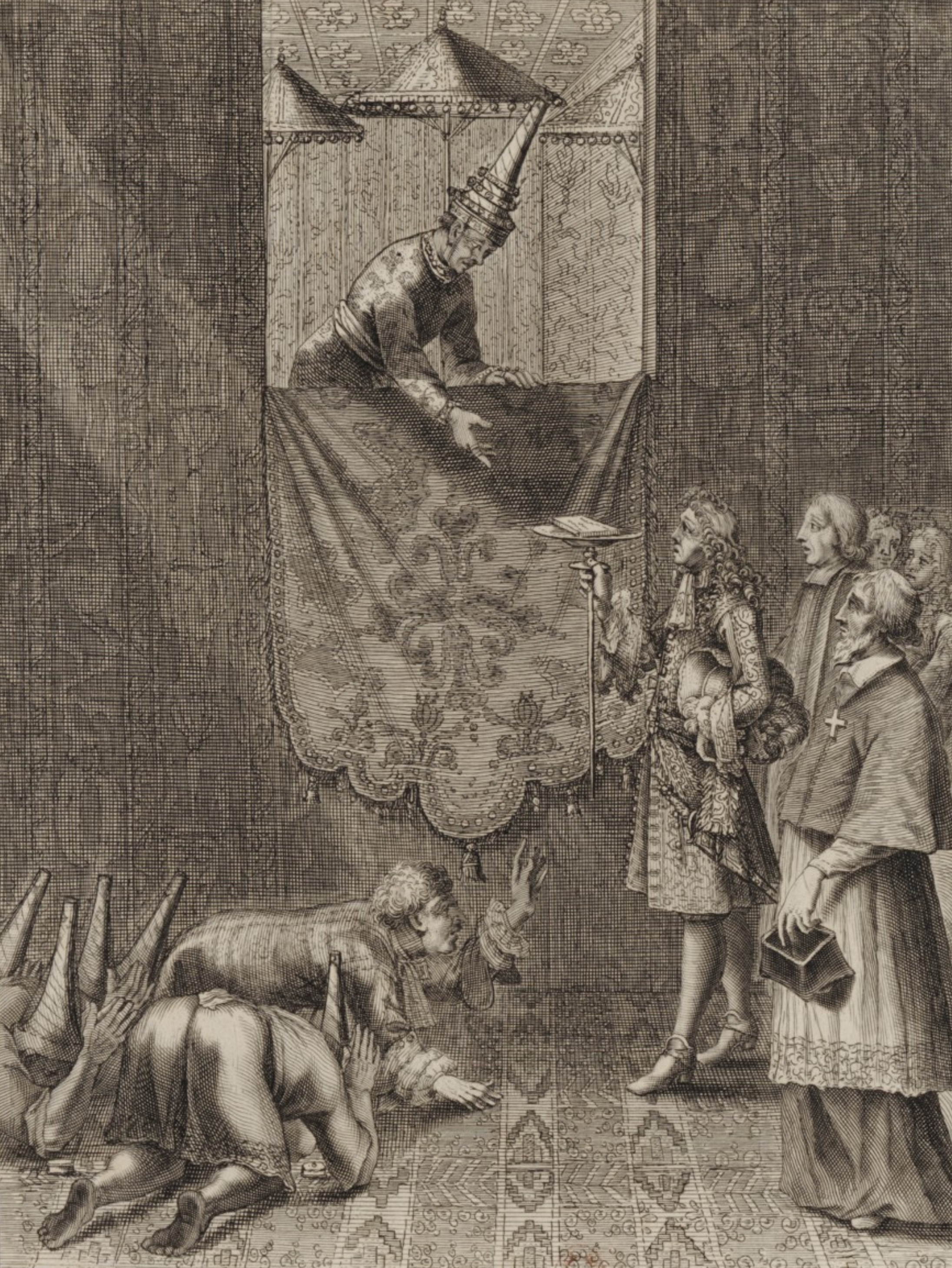
Chevalier de Chaumont presents a letter from Louis XIV to King Narai at the Hall of Sanphet, Ayutthaya, on 18 October 1685 – a drawing by Jean-Baptiste Nolin.

Alexandre, Chevalier de Chaumont (1640 – 28 January 1710 in Paris) was the first French ambassador for King Louis XIV in Siam in 1685. He was accompanied on his mission by Abbé de Choisy, the Jesuit Guy Tachard, and Father Bénigne Vachet of the Société des Missions Étrangères de Paris. He was also bringing back to Siam the two ambassadors of the 1684 First Siamese Embassy to France.

He tried without success to convert King Narai the Great to Catholicism and to conclude significant commercial treaties.

He is best remembered for his memoirs describing life in 17th century Siam.

A "Chevalier de Chaumont" is also mentioned several times in the Jesuit Relations.

== See also ==
- France–Thailand relations
