= Guy Tachard =

French mathematician

Father Guy Tachard
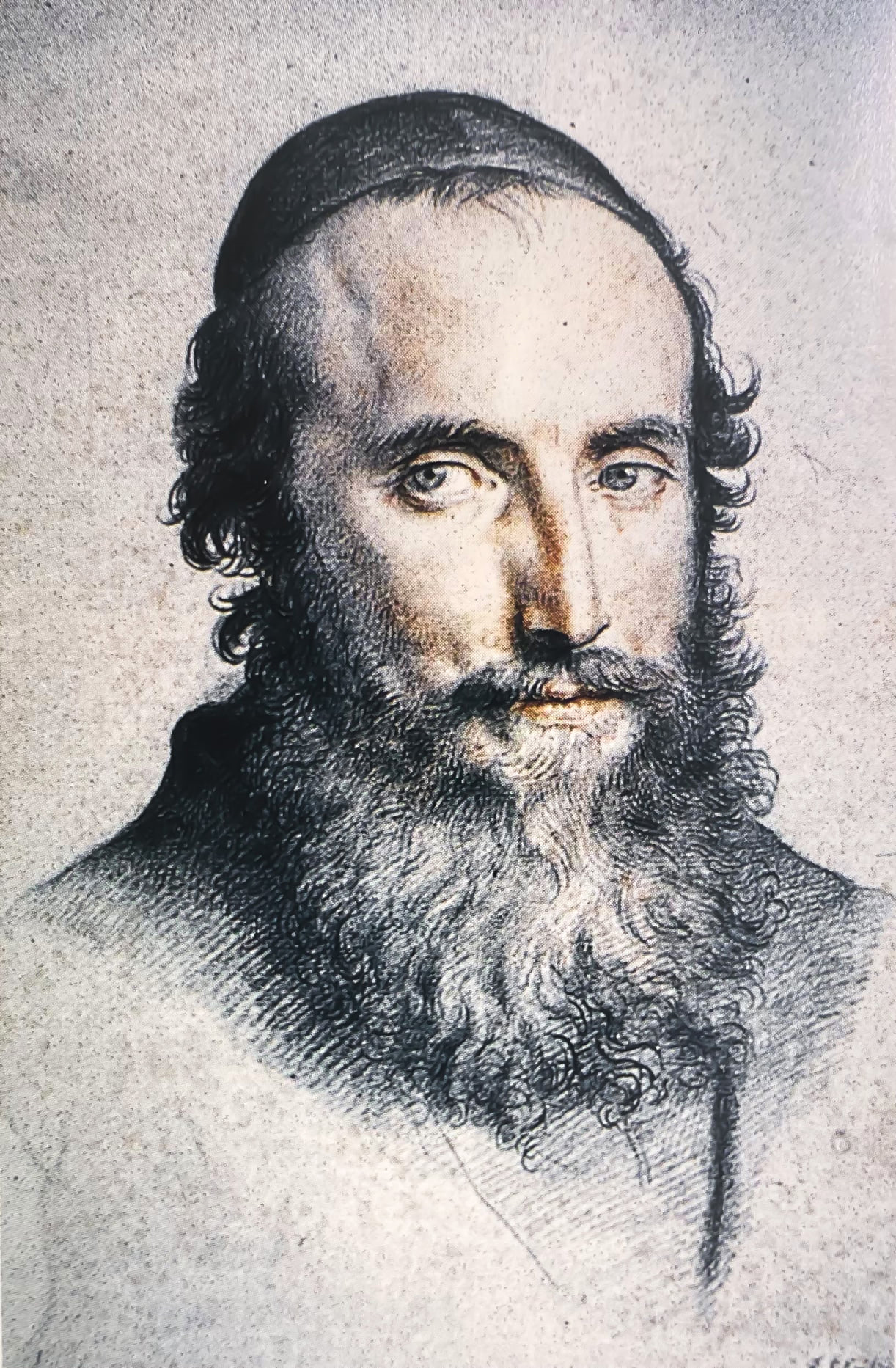
- Father Guy Tachard (1651–1712), drawn by Carlo Maratta.
- Title: Jesuit missionary

Personal life
- Born: 1651 Marthon, France
- Died: 1712 (aged 60–61) Chandernagor, India
- Other name: Père Tachard

Religious life
- Religion: Roman Catholic

Senior posting
- Based in: Kingdom of Siam

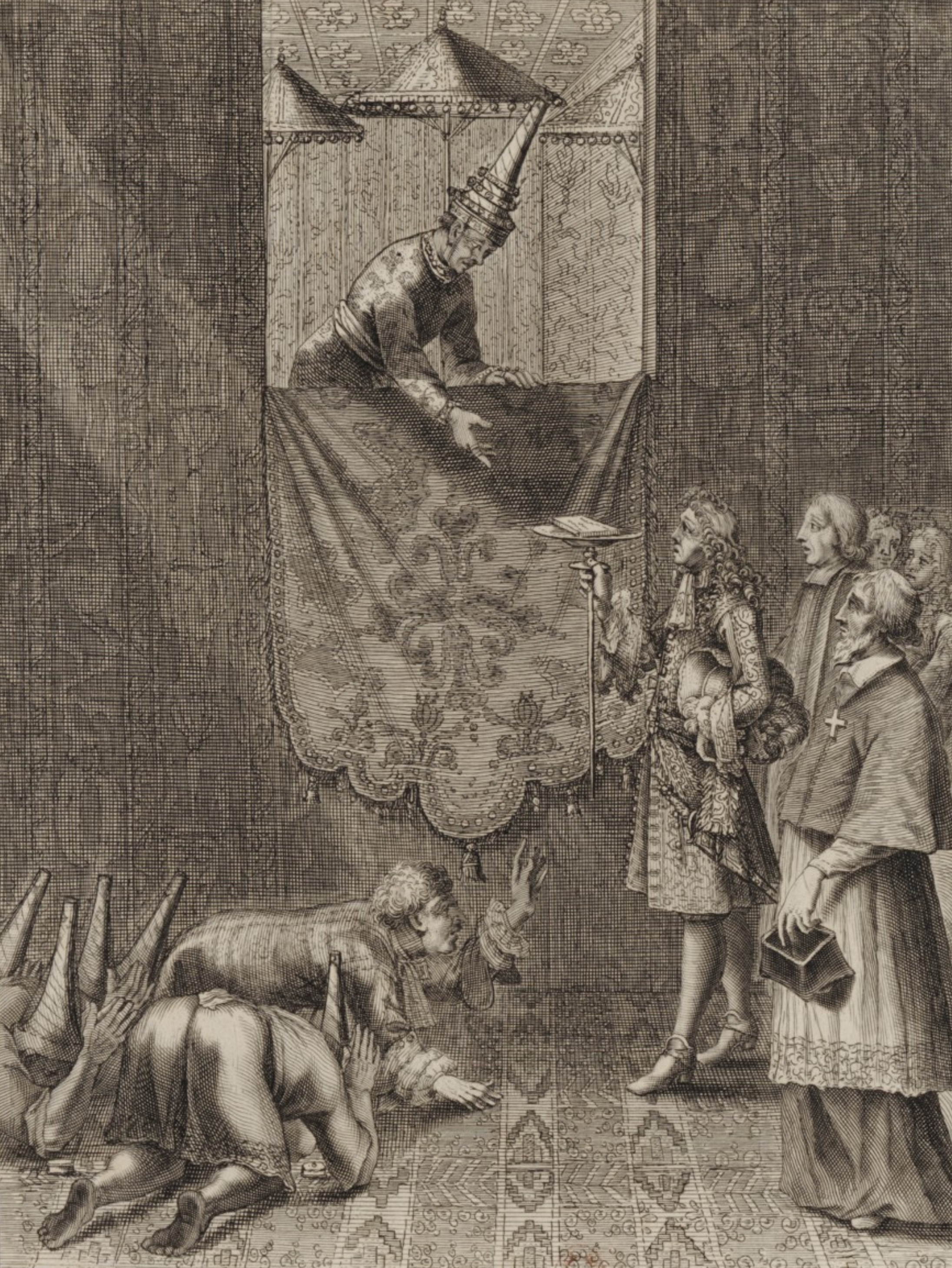
Chevalier de Chaumont with the Jesuits presents a letter from Louis XIV to King Narai, in 1685.

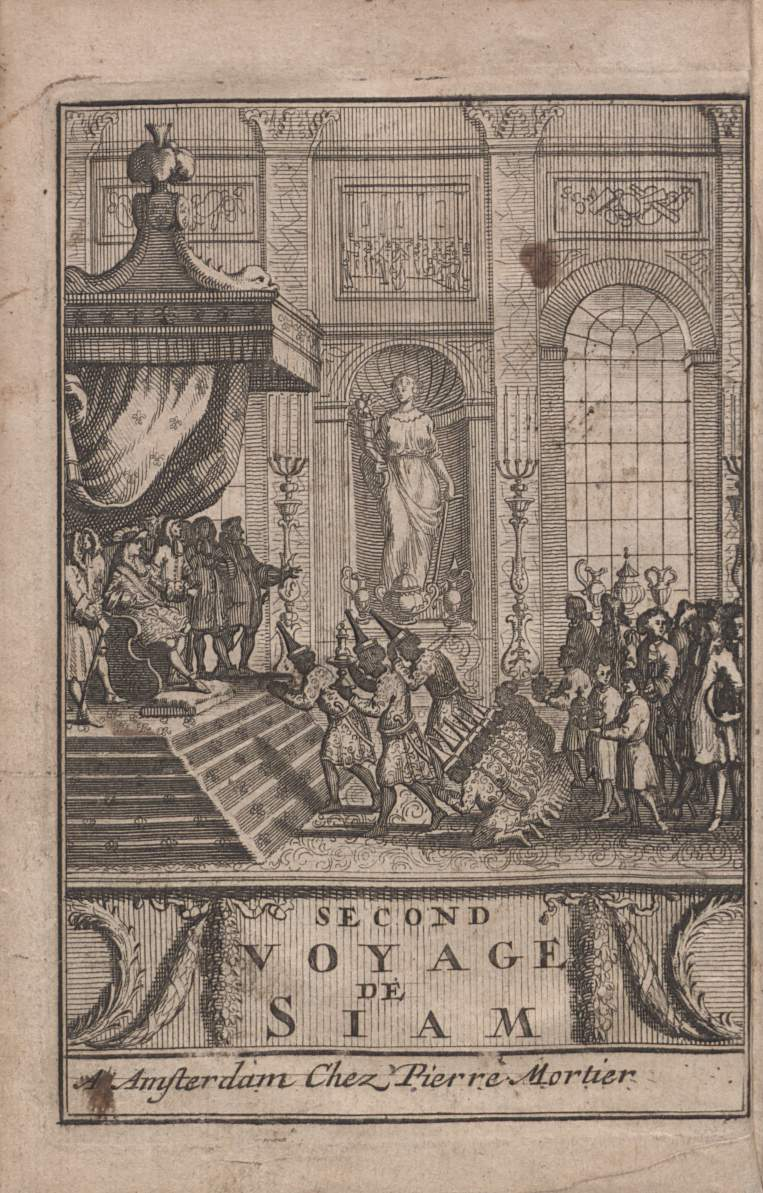
Second voyage du pere Tachard et des Jesuites envoyes par le roy (1689)

Guy Tachard (French: [gi taʃaʁ]; 1651 – 1712), also known as Père Tachard, was a French Jesuit missionary and mathematician of the 17th century, who was sent on two occasions to the Kingdom of Siam by Louis XIV. He was born in Marthon, near Angoulême.

In 1680, Tachard went to the Caribbean (Antilles) with Jean II d'Estrées.

Tachard was involved in embassies to Siam, which came as responses to embassies sent by the Siamese King Narai to France in order to obtain an alliance against the Dutch.

== First embassy to Siam (1685) ==
Tachard was sent in 1685 with five other Jesuits under Superior Jean de Fontaney, on a first French embassy to Siam led by Chevalier de Chaumont and François-Timoléon de Choisy, and accompanied by Claude de Forbin. The objective of the Jesuits was to complete a scientific expedition to the Indies and China. Enticed by the Greek Constantine Phaulkon, he returned to France to suggest an alliance with the king of Siam Narai to Louis XIV.

The five other Jesuits Fathers continued to China where they arrived in February 1688: Jean de Fontaney (1643–1710), Joachim Bouvet (1656–1730), Jean-François Gerbillon (1654–1707), Louis Le Comte (1655–1728) and Claude de Visdelou (1656–1737).

The two ships of the embassy returned to France with a Siamese embassy on board, led by the Siamese ambassador Kosa Pan, who was bringing a proposal for an eternal alliance between France and Siam. The embassy stayed in France from June 1686 to March 1687.

== Second embassy to Siam (1687) ==
A second embassy to Siam was sent in March 1687. organized by Colbert, of which Tachard was part again. The embassy consisted in five warships, led by General Desfarges, and was bringing the Siamese embassy home.

The mission was led by Simon de la Loubère and Claude Céberet du Boullay, director of the French East India Company. A young Jesuit had been brought by Tachard: the future composer André Cardinal Destouches. However, apart from the reaffirmation of the 1685 commercial treaty, the mission achieved little else.

== Embassy to France and Rome (1688) ==
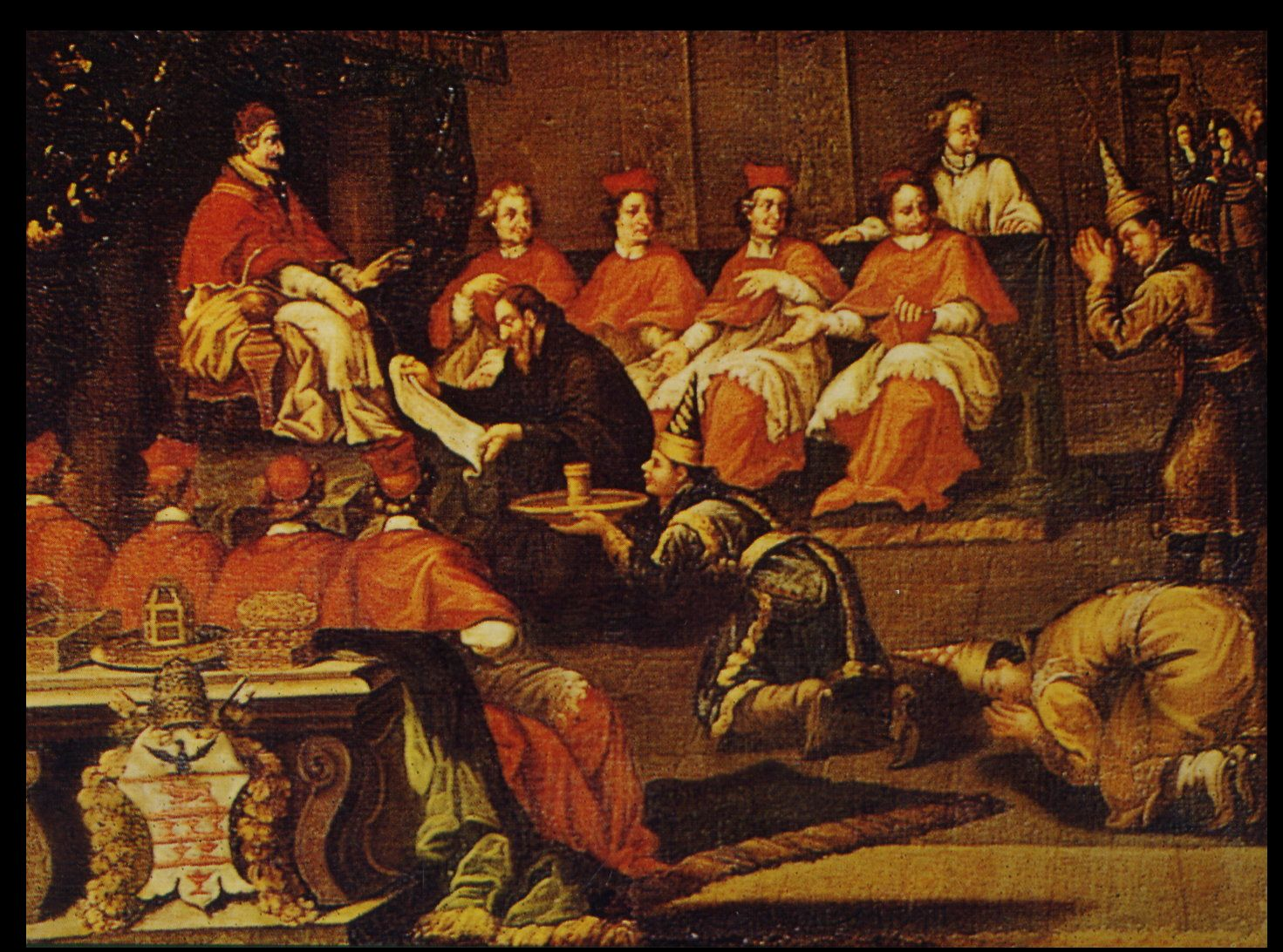
Tachard, with Siamese envoys, translating the letter of king Narai to Pope Innocent XI, December 1688

King Narai dispatched the third Siamese mission to France and Rome in January 1688. Tachard accompanied 3 Siamese envoys Ok-khun Chamnan, Ok-khun Wiset Puban, Ok-muen Pipith Raja. Ok-khun Chamnan led the mission. Tachard had the title of "Ambassador Extraordinary for the King of Siam (ambassadeur extraordinaire pour le roi de Siam)". The French Envoy Extraordinary to Siam, Simon de la Loubère traveled with them back to France. They left Siam aboard the ship Gaillard on 3 January 1688. They were followed three days later by 3 catechists from Tonkin (Dionisio Li-njain, Antonio Van Kiet, Michel Foghanlin), and five Siamese students were sent to study at the Collège Louis-le-Grand in Paris.

During their first visit to Paris they could not meet Louis XIV, because King Narai was a devout Buddhist and resisted French pressure to convert to Catholicism. Thus the Siamese Ambassadors and Vietnamese Catechists, with Father Tachard met with Pope Innocent XI in the Vatican on 23 December 1688. Tachard acted as translator for the Siamese embassy and he translated King Narai's letter to the Pope. The Italian painter Carlo Maratta made portraits of the Siamese ambassadors and Tonkin catechists in Rome during December 1688/January 1689 (Vati can Library BA V.Vat. Lat.). They met the pope again for a farewell audience on 5 January 1689.

The dis-embarkment of French troops in Bangkok and Mergui led to strong nationalistic movements in Siam directed by Phra Petratcha. This ultimately resulted in the Siamese revolution of 1688 in which king Narai died on 10/11 July 1688, Phaulkon was executed, and Phra Petratcha became king. Desfarges negotiated to return with his men to Pondicherry. In the later part of 1689, Desfarges captured the island of Phuket in an attempt to restore French control.

== Other travels ==
In 1690, when Tachard tried to return to Siam, a revolution had happened, King Narai was already dead and the new King Petratcha was on the throne. Tachard had to stop at Pondicherry and return to France without obtaining a permission to enter the country.

In 1699, Tachard again went to Siam, and managed to enter the country this time. He met with Kosa Pan, now Minister of Foreign Affairs and Trade, and the new king Petracha, but the meeting remained purely formal and led to nothing.

Tachard travelled a fifth time to Asia and died in the Indian city Chandernagor in 1712.

== Works ==
- Tachard, Guy (1688) A relation of the voyage to Siam : performed by six Jesuits sent by the French king, to the Indies and China in the year 1685 (Google Books: original, English translation)
- Tachard, Guy (1689) Second Voyage (Google Books)
- Guy Tachard, Michael Smithies, Choisy, Simon de la Loubère (2000) A Siamese Embassy Lost in Africa 1686: The Odyssey of Ok-khun Chamnan, Silkworm Books, Cape of Good Hope (South Africa), ISBN 974-7100-95-9

== See also ==
- France-Thailand relations
