= History of Bangkok =

Timeline
c 14th century	Settlement of Bangkok
c 1538	Construction of river bypass canal
1688	Siege of Bangkok expels French garrison
1767	Fall of Ayutthaya; Taksin establishes Thonburi as capital
1782	Phutthayotfa Chulalok moves capital to eastern bank
1820	Cholera pandemic kills 30,000
1849	Cholera again devastates population
1864	First paved road constructed
1893	Paknam railway opens, Paknam Incident and French blockade
1894	Electric trams begin service
1914	Beginning of city water supply
1924	Don Mueang Airport opens
1925	First recorded flood
1932	Memorial Bridge opens and coup ends absolute monarchy
1941–45	Bombing of Bangkok in World War II
1942	City-wide flooding lasts 2 months
1966	Bangkok hosts the 5th Asian Games
1968	First high-rise building constructed and Bangkok tram service ends
1972	Merger of Phra Nakhon and Thonburi Provinces
1975	Establishment of Bangkok Metropolitan Administration and first governor election
1981	First expressway opens to service
1986	Rama IX Bridge opens
1990	Gas truck explodes on New Petchburi Road
1995	Prannok Pier capsizes
1998	Bangkok hosts Asian Games for the fourth time
1999	First mass-rapid transit line in Bangkok opens (BTS Sukumvit and Silom Lines)
2004	Metropolitan Rapid Transit (Bangkok) Blue Line opens
2006	Suvarnabhumi Airport opens
2011	Severe floods inundate parts of city
2015	August 2015 Bangkok bombing kills 23 in Thailand's deadliest-ever single terrorist attack
2016	King Power Mahanakhon is complete. It was the tallest skyscraper in Thailand.
2021	Krung Thep Aphiwat Central Terminal opens
2024	Major reform of the bus system
2025	An earthquake in Bangkok and a sinkhole on Samsen Road
2026	Flooding in Bangkok

The history of Bangkok, the capital of Thailand, dates at least to the early 15th century, when it was under the rule of Ayutthaya. Due to its strategic location near the mouth of the Chao Phraya River, the town gradually increased in importance, and after the fall of Ayutthaya King Taksin established his new capital of Thonburi there, on the river's west bank. King Phutthayotfa Chulalok, who succeeded Taksin, moved the capital to the eastern bank in 1782, to which the city dates its foundation under its current Thai name, "Krung Thep Maha Nakhon". Bangkok has since undergone tremendous changes, growing rapidly, especially in the second half of the 20th century, to become the primate city of Thailand. It was the centre of Siam's modernization in the late 19th century, subjected to Allied bombing during the Second World War, and has long been the modern nation's central political stage, with numerous uprisings and coups d'état having taken place on its streets throughout the years.

== Under Ayutthaya ==
It is not known exactly when the area which is now Bangkok was first settled. It probably originated as a small farming and trading community, situated in a meander of the Chao Phraya River within the mandala of Ayutthaya's influence. The town had become an important customs outpost by as early as the 15th century; the title of its customs official is given as Nai Phra Khanon Thonburi (Thai: นายพระขนอนทณบุรี) (Note: Note that the Thai spelling of Thonburi here is different from the modern name, which is spelled ธนบุรี.) in a document from the reign of Ayutthayan king Chao Sam Phraya (1424–1448). The name also appears in the 1805 revised code of laws known as the Law of Three Seals.

At the time, the Chao Phraya flowed through what are now the Bangkok Noi and Bangkok Yai canals, forming a large loop in which lay the town. In the reign of King Chairacha (either in 1538 or 1542), a waterway was excavated, bypassing the loop and shortening the route for ships sailing up to Ayutthaya. The flow of the river has since changed to follow the new waterway, dividing the town and making the western part an island. This geographical feature may have given the town the name Bang Ko (บางเกาะ), meaning 'island village', which later became Bangkok (บางกอก, pronounced in Thai as [bāːŋ kɔ̀ːk]). Another theory regarding the origin of the name speculates that it is shortened from Bang Makok (บางมะกอก), makok being the name of Spondias pinnata, a plant bearing olive-like fruit. This is supported by the fact that Wat Arun, a historic temple in the area, used to be named Wat Makok. Specific mention of the town was first made in the royal chronicles from the reign of King Maha Chakkraphat (1548–1568), giving its name as Thonburi Si Mahasamut (ธนบุรีศรีมหาสมุทร). Bangkok was probably a colloquial name, albeit one widely adopted by foreign visitors.

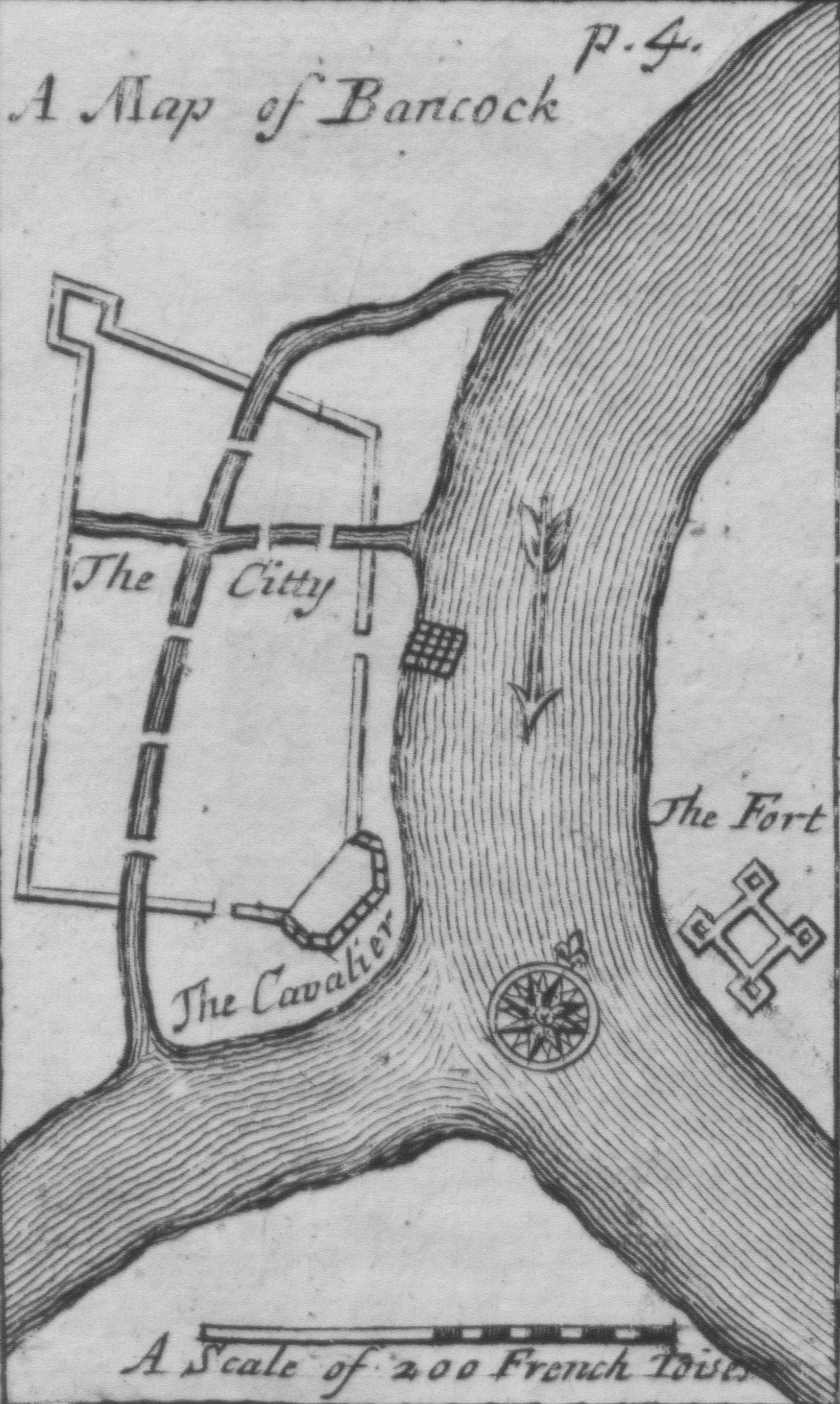
Map of 17th-century Bangkok from Simon de la Loubère's Du Royaume de Siam

The importance of Bangkok increased with the amount of Ayutthaya's maritime trade. Dutch records noted that ships passing through Bangkok were required to declare their goods and number of passengers, as well as pay customs duties. Ships' cannons would be confiscated and held there before they were allowed to proceed upriver to Ayutthaya. An early English language account is that of Adam Denton, who arrived aboard the Globe, an East India Company merchantman bearing a letter from King James I, which arrived in "the Road of Syam" (Pak Nam) on 15 August 1612, where the port officer of Bangkok attended to the ship. Denton's account mentions that he and his companions journeyed "up the river some twenty miles to a town called Bancope, where we were well received, and further 100 miles to the city...."

Ayutthaya's maritime trade was at its height during the reign of King Narai (1656–1688). Recognition of the city's strategic location guarding the water passage to Ayutthaya lead to expansion of the military presence there. A fort of Western design was constructed on the east side of the river around 1685–1687 under the supervision of French engineer de la Mare, probably replacing an earlier structure, while plans to rebuild the fort on the west bank were also made. De la Mare had arrived with the French embassy of Chevalier de Chaumont, and remained in Siam along with Chevalier de Forbin, who had been appointed governor of Bangkok. The Bangkok garrison under Forbin consisted of Siamese, Portuguese, and French reportedly totalling about one thousand men.

French control over the city was further consolidated when the French General Desfarges, who had arrived with the second French embassy in 1687, secured the king's permission to board troops there. This, however, lead to resentment among Siamese nobles, led by Phetracha, ultimately resulting in the Siamese revolution of 1688, in which King Narai was overthrown and 40,000 Siamese troops besieged Bangkok's eastern fort for four months before an agreement was reached and the French were allowed to withdraw. The revolution resulted in Siam's ties with the West being virtually severed, steering its trade towards China and Japan. The eastern fort was subsequently demolished on Phetracha's orders.

== Thonburi ==
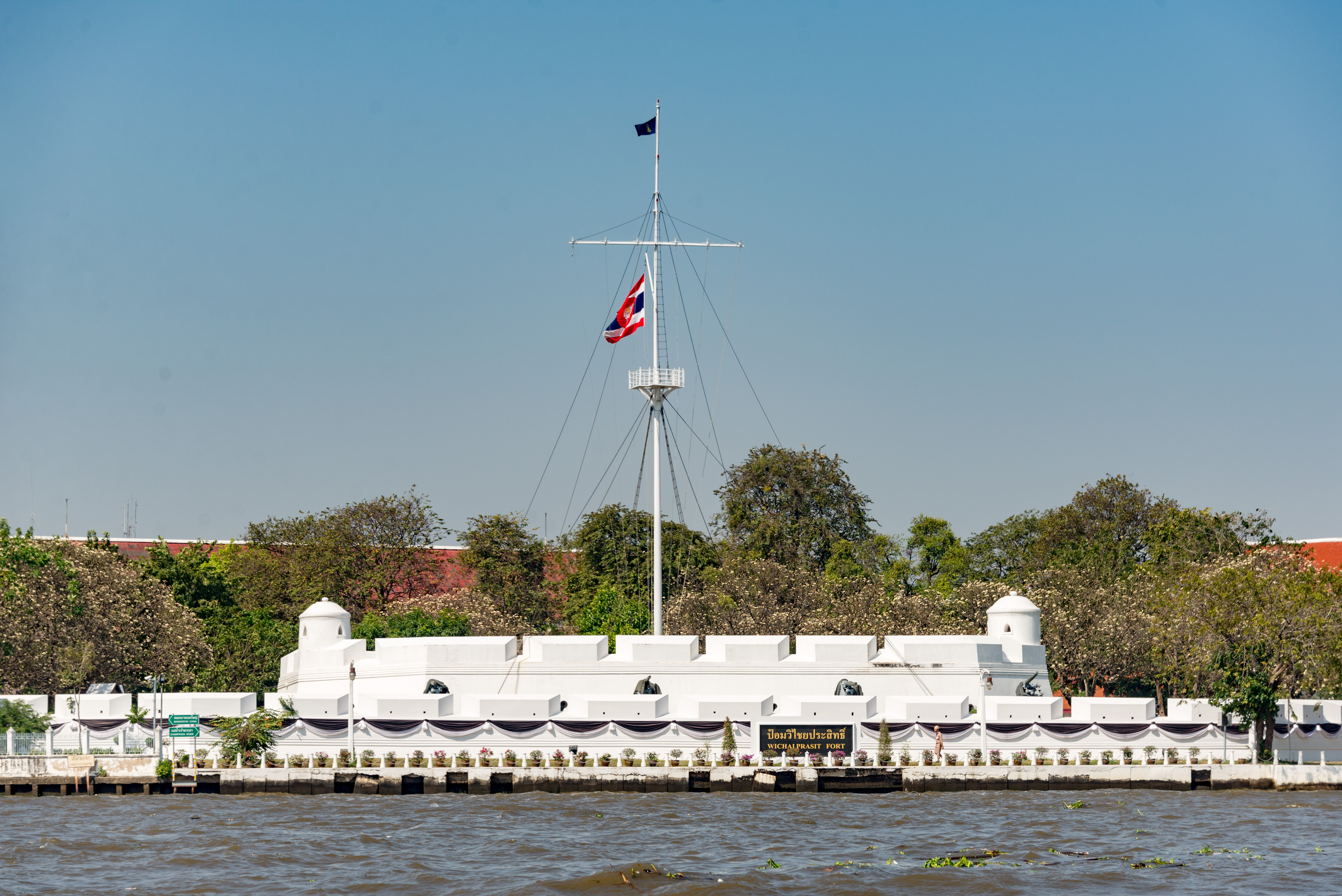
Wichai Prasit Fort on the west bank of the river is now within the grounds of the Royal Thai Navy Headquarters.

Ayutthaya was razed by the Burmese in 1767. In the following months, multiple factions competed for control of the kingdom's lands. Of these, Phraya Tak, governor of Tak and a general fighting in Ayutthaya's defence prior to its fall, emerged as the strongest. After succeeding in reclaiming the cities of Ayutthaya and Bangkok, Phraya Tak declared himself king (popularly known as King Taksin) on 28 December 1767 and established Thonburi as his capital. Reasons given for this change include the totality of Ayutthaya's destruction and Thonburi's strategic location. Being a fortified town with a sizeable population meant that not much would need to be reconstructed. The existence of an old Chinese trading settlement on the eastern bank allowed Taksin to use his Chinese connections to import rice and revive trade.

King Taksin had the city area extended northwards to border the Bangkok Noi Canal. A moat was dug to protect the city's western border, on which new city walls and fortifications were built. Moats and walls were also constructed on the eastern bank, encircling the city together with the canals on the western side. The king's palace (Thonburi Palace) was built within the old city walls, including the temples of Wat Chaeng (Wat Arun) and Wat Thai Talat (Wat Molilokkayaram) within the palace grounds. Outlying orchards were re-landscaped for rice farming.

Much of Taksin's reign was spent in military campaigns to consolidate the Thonburi Kingdom's hold over Siamese lands. His kingdom, however, would last only until 1782 when a coup was mounted against him, and the general Chao Phraya Chakri established himself as king, later to be known as Phutthayotfa Chulalok or Rama I.

== Rattanakosin ==
Map showing the extent of the capital during the Thonburi and early Rattanakosin periods

Rama I re-established the capital on the more strategic east bank of the river, relocating the Chinese already settled there to the area between Wat Sam Pluem and Wat Sampheng (which developed into Bangkok's Chinatown). Fortifications were rebuilt, and another series of moats was created, encircling the city in an area known as Rattanakosin Island.

The erection of the city pillar on 21 April 1782 is regarded as the formal date of the city's establishment. (The year would later mark the start of the Rattanakosin Era after calendar reforms by King Rama V in 1888.) Rama I named the new city Krung Rattanakosin In Ayothaya (กรุงรัตนโกสินทร์อินท์อโยธยา). This was later modified by King Nangklao to be: Krungthepmahanakhon Bowonrattanakosin Mahintha-ayutthaya. While settlements on both banks were commonly called Bangkok, both the Burney Treaty of 1826 and the Roberts Treaty of 1833 refer to the capital as the City of Sia-Yut'hia. King Mongkut (Rama IV) would later give the city its full ceremonial name:

Krungthepmahanakhon Amonrattanakosin Mahintharayutthaya Mahadilokphop Noppharatratchathaniburirom Udomratchaniwetmahasathan Amonphiman-Awatansathit Sakkathattiyawitsanukamprasit
กรุงเทพมหานคร อมรรัตนโกสินทร์ มหินทรายุทธยา มหาดิลกภพ นพรัตนราชธานีบุรีรมย์ อุดมราชนิเวศน์มหาสถาน อมรพิมานอวตารสถิต สักกะทัตติยะวิษณุกรรมประสิทธิ์

Rama I modelled his city after the former capital of Ayutthaya, with the Grand Palace, Front Palace and royal temples by the river, next to the royal field (now Sanam Luang). Continuing outwards were the royal court of justice, royal stables and military prison. Government offices were located within the Grand Palace, while residences of nobles were concentrated south of the palace walls. Settlements spread outwards from the city centre.

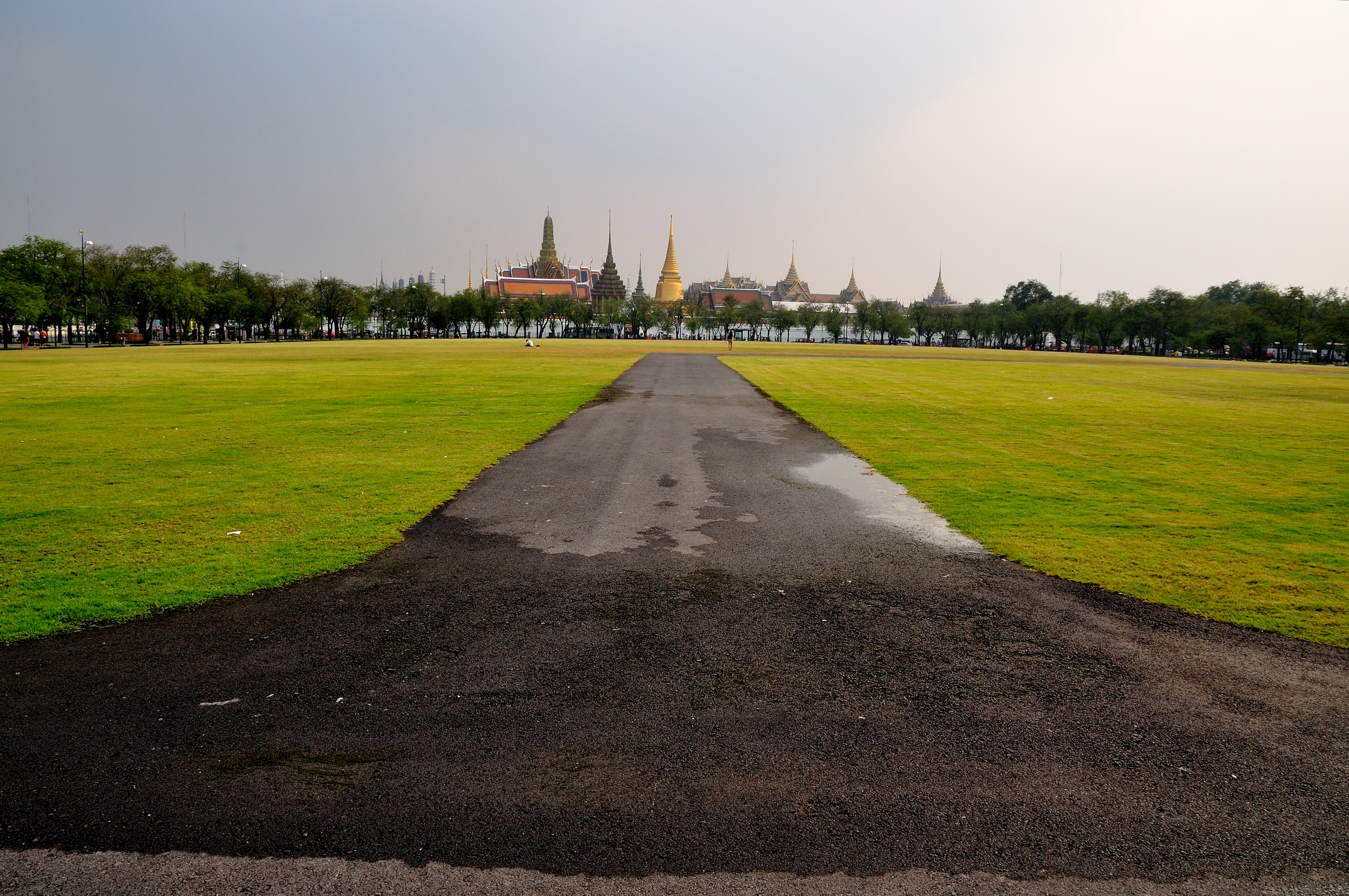
Sanam Luang in front of the Grand Palace complex. Since the city's foundation, the field has been used for various royal functions.

The new capital is referred to in Thai sources as Rattanakosin, a name shared by the Siamese kingdom of this historical period. (Note: The 1833 Treaty of Amity and Commerce between Siam and the United States, however, refers to the city as "the Royal City of Sia-Yut'hia (commonly called Bangkok)". Treaty author Edmund Roberts writes: The spot on which the present capital stands, and the country in its vicinity, on both banks of the river for a considerable distance, were formerly, before the removal of the court to its present situation, called Bang-kok; but since that time, and for nearly sixty years past, it has been named Sia yuthia, (pronounced see-ah you-tè-ah, and by the natives, Krung, that is, the capital ;) it is called by both names here, but never Bang-kok; and they always correct foreigners when the latter make this mistake. The villages which occupy the right hand of the river, opposite to the capital, pass under the general name of Bang-kok.) The name Krung Thep and Krung Thep Maha Nakhon, both shortened forms of the full ceremonial name, began to be used near the end of the 19th century. Foreigners, however, continued to refer to the city by the name Bangkok, which has seen continued use until this day.

Most of Rama I's reign was also marked by continued military campaigns, though the Burmese threat gradually declined afterwards. His successors consistently saw to the renovation of old temples, palaces, and monuments in the city. New canals were also built, gradually expanding the fledgling city as areas available for agriculture increased and new transport networks were created.

At the time of the city's foundation, most of the population lived by the river or the canals, often in floating houses on the water. Waterways served as the main method of transportation, and farming communities depended on them for irrigation. Outside the city walls, settlements sprawled along both river banks. Forced settlers, mostly captives of war, also formed several ethnic communities outside the city walls.

Large numbers of Chinese immigrants continued to settle in Bangkok, especially during the early 19th century. Such was their prominence that Europeans visiting in the 1820s estimated that they formed over half of the city population. The Chinese excelled in trade, and led the development of a market economy. The Chinese settlement at Sampheng had become a bustling market by 1835.

== Modernization ==
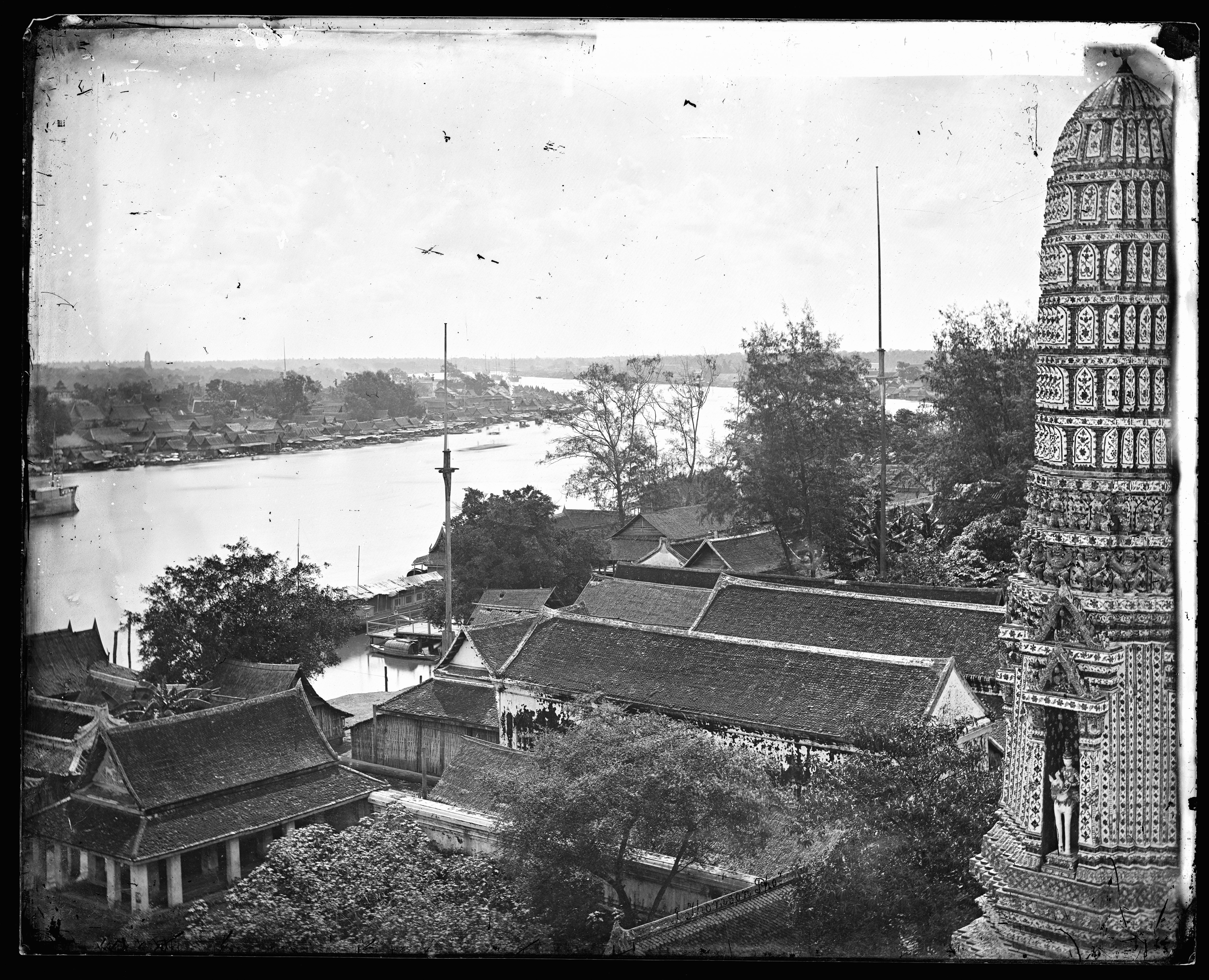
Photograph by John Thomson of the Chao Phraya River from Wat Arun, 1865

By the mid-19th century, the West had become an increasingly powerful presence. Missionaries, envoys and merchants began re-visiting Bangkok and Siam, bringing with them both modern innovations and the threat of colonialism. King Mongkut (Rama IV, reigned 1851–1868) was open to Western ideas and knowledge, but was also forced to acknowledge their powers, with the signing of the Bowring Treaty in 1855. During his reign, industrialization began taking place in Bangkok, which saw the introduction of the steam engine, modern shipbuilding and the printing press. Influenced by the Western community, Charoen Krung Road, the city's first paved street, was constructed in 1862–1864. This was followed by Bamrung Mueang, Fueang Nakhon, Trong (now Rama IV) and Si Lom Roads. Land transport would later surpass the canals in importance, shifting people's homes from floating dwellings toward permanent buildings. The limits of the city proper were also expanded during his reign, extending to the Phadung Krung Kasem Canal, dug in 1851.

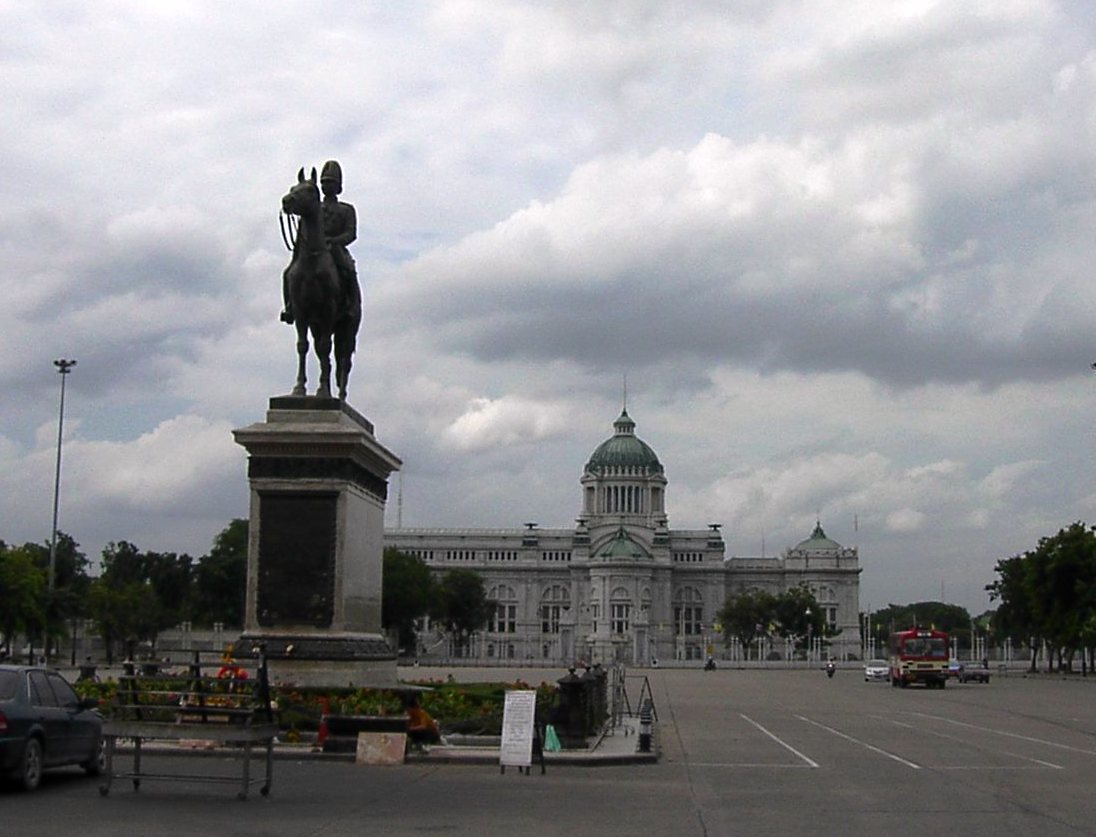
King Chulalongkorn's equestrian statue in the Royal Plaza reflects the adoption of Western ideas and designs

King Mongkut's son Chulalongkorn (r. 1868–1910) was set upon modernizing the country. He engaged in wide-ranging reforms, abolishing slavery, corvée (unfree labour) and the feudal system, and creating a centralized bureaucracy and a professional army. The Western concept of nationhood was adopted, and national borders demarcated against British and French territories. Disputes with the French resulted in the Paknam Incident in 1893, when the French sent gunboats up the Chao Phraya to blockade Bangkok, resulting in Siam's concession of territory to France.

With Chulalongkorn's reforms, governance of the capital and the surrounding areas, established as Monthon Krung Thep Phra Mahanakhon (มณฑลกรุงเทพพระมหานคร), came under the Ministry of Urban Affairs (Nakhonban). During his reign many more canals and roads were built, expanding the urban reaches of the capital. Infrastructure was developed, with the introduction of railway and telegraph services between Bangkok and Samut Prakan and then expanding countrywide. Electricity was introduced, first to palaces and government offices, then to serve electric trams in the capital and later the general public. The King's fascination with the West was reflected in the royal adoption of Western dress and fashions, but most noticeably in architecture. He commissioned the construction of the neoclassical Ananta Samakhom Throne Hall at the new Dusit Palace, which was linked to the historic city centre by the grand Ratchadamnoen Avenue, inspired by the Champs-Élysées in Paris. Examples of Western influence in architecture became visible throughout the city.

== 20th century ==
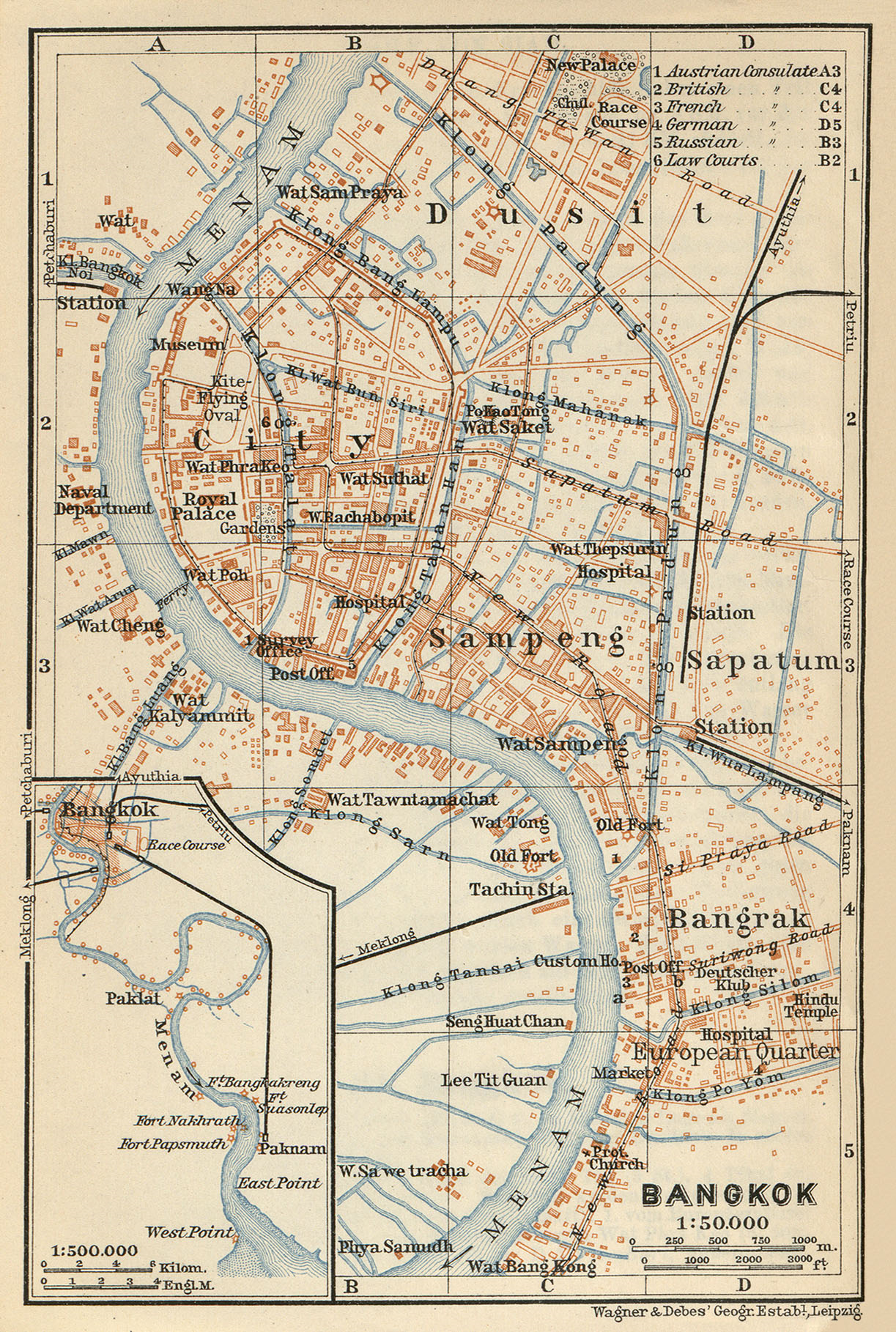
Baedeker map of the city, c. 1914

By 1900, rural market zones in Bangkok began developing into residential districts. Rama VI (1910–1925) continued his predecessor's program of the development of public works by establishing Chulalongkorn University in 1916, and commissioned a system of locks to control waterway levels surrounding the developing city, he also provided the city's first and largest recreational area, Lumphini Park. The Memorial Bridge was constructed in 1932 to connect Thonburi to Bangkok, which was believed to promote economic growth and modernization in a period when infrastructure was developing considerably. Bangkok became the centre stage for power struggles between the military and political elite as the country abolished absolute monarchy in 1932. It was subject to Japanese occupation and Allied bombing during World War II. With the war over in 1945, British and Indian troops landed in September, and during their brief occupation of the city disarmed the Japanese troops. A significant event following the return of the young king, Ananda Mahidol, to Thailand, intended to defuse post-war tensions lingering between Bangkok's ethnic Chinese and Thai people, was his visit to Bangkok's Chinatown Sam Peng Lane (ซอยสำเพ็ง), on 3 June 1946.

As a result of pro-Western bloc treaties Bangkok rapidly grew in the post-war period as a result of United States developmental aid and government-sponsored investment. Infrastructure, including the Don Mueang International Airport and highways, was built and expanded. Bangkok's role as an American military R&R destination launched its tourism industry as well as sex trade. Disproportionate urban development led to increasing income inequalities and unprecedented migration from rural areas into Bangkok; its population surged from 1.8 to 3 million in the 1960s. Following the United States' withdrawal from Vietnam, Japanese businesses took over as leaders in investment, and the expansion of export-oriented manufacturing led to growth of the financial market in Bangkok. Rapid growth of the city continued through the 1980s and early 1990s, until it was stalled by the 1997 Asian financial crisis. By then, many public and social issues had emerged, among them the strain on infrastructure reflected in the city's notorious traffic jams. Bangkok's role as the nation's political stage continues to be seen in strings of popular protests, from the student uprisings in 1973 and 1976, anti-military demonstrations in 1992, and successive anti-government protests by the "Yellow Shirt" and "Red Shirt" movements from 2008 on.

Administratively, eastern Bangkok and Thonburi had been established as separate provinces in 1915. (The province east of the river was named Phra Nakhon (พระนคร.) A series of decrees in 1971–1972 resulted in the merger of these provinces and its local administrations, forming the current city of Bangkok which is officially known in Thai as Krung Thep Maha Nakhon. The Bangkok Metropolitan Administration (BMA) was created in 1975 to govern the city, and its governor has been elected since 1985.

== Gallery ==
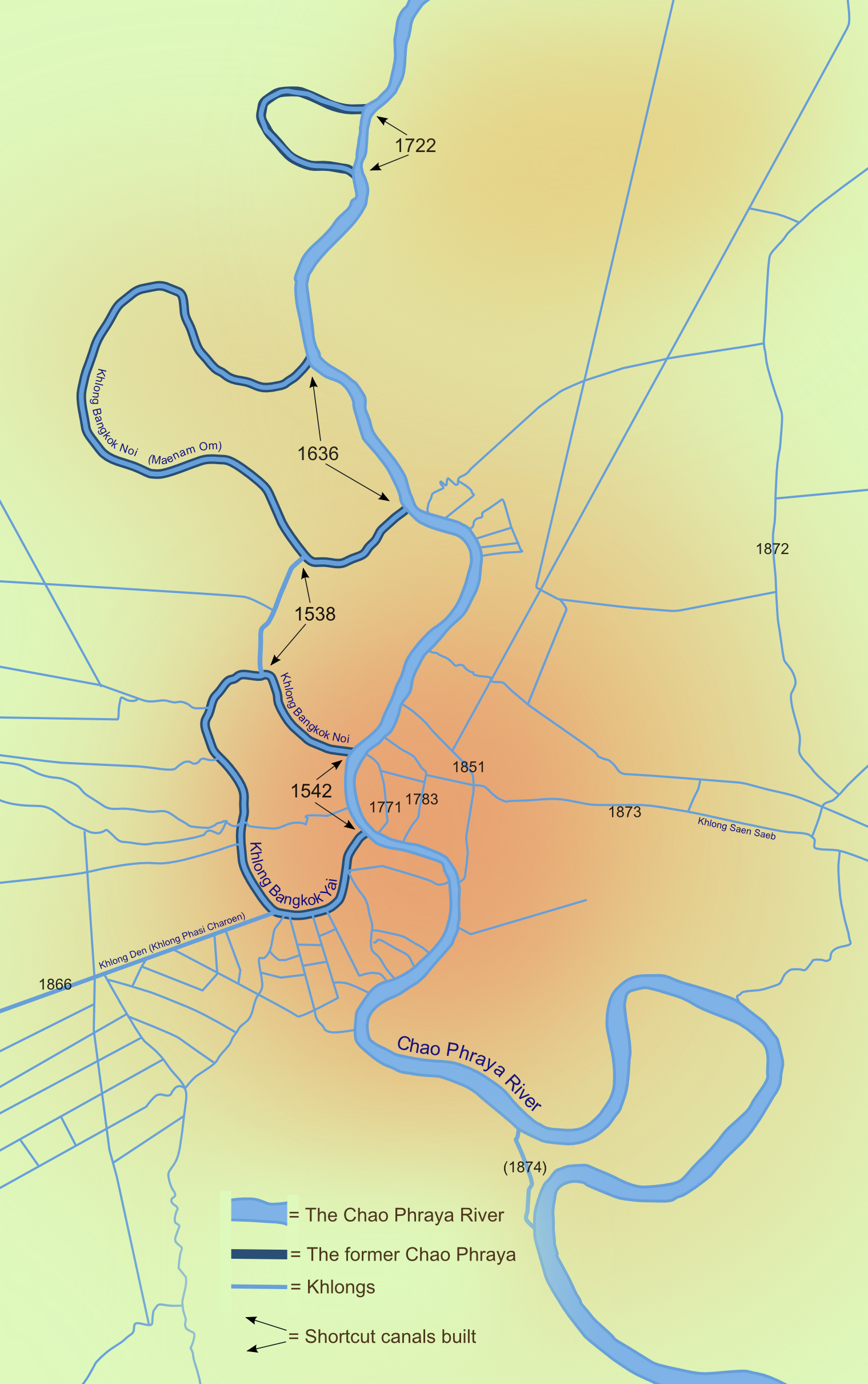
Construction of Bangkok's major canals over time, the earliest dating to the reign of King Chairacha (r. 1534–1546)

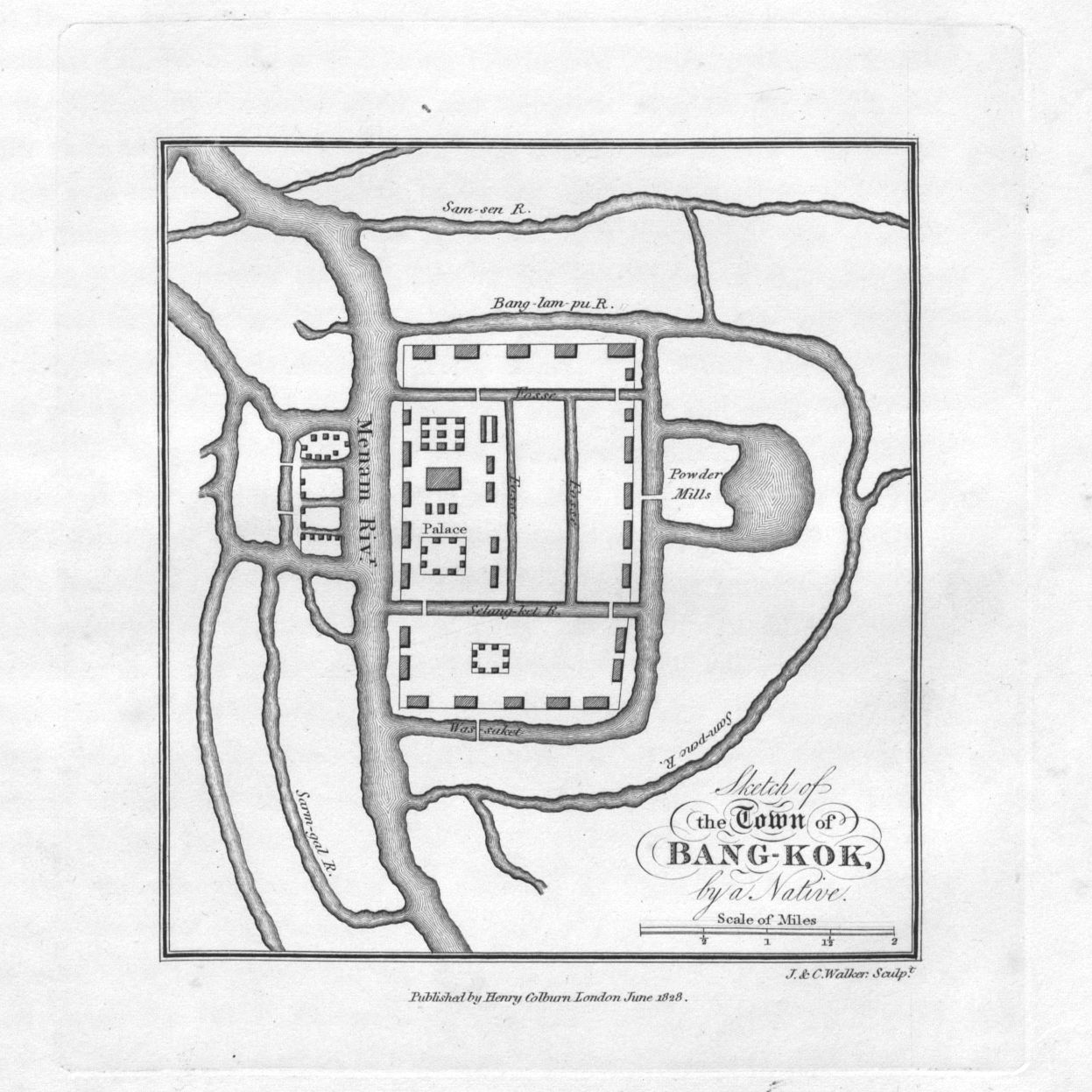
A map of Bangkok in the 1820s; from the journal of the diplomatic mission to Siam and Cochin-China by John Crawfurd

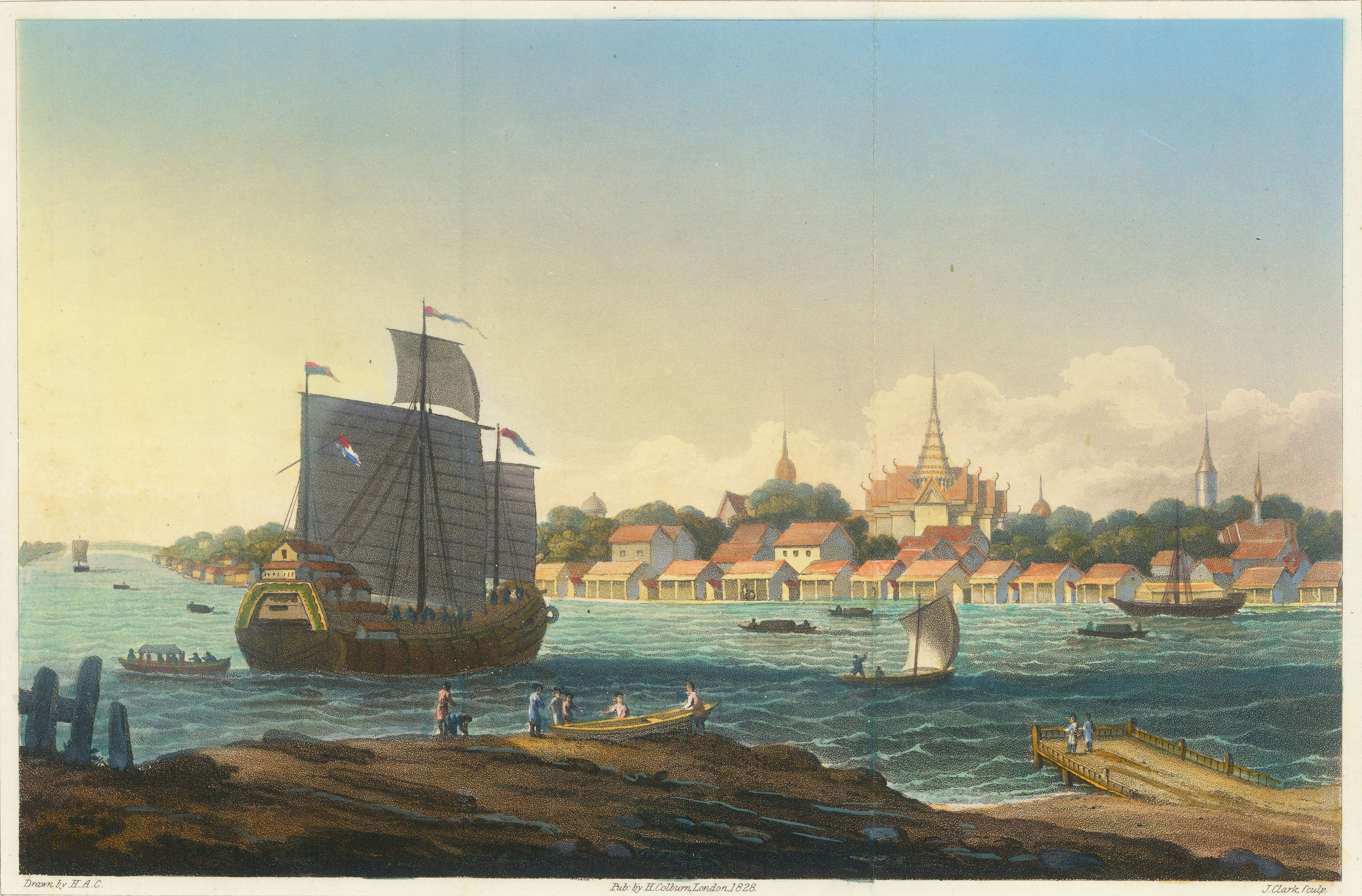
View of the city of Bangkok, 1828

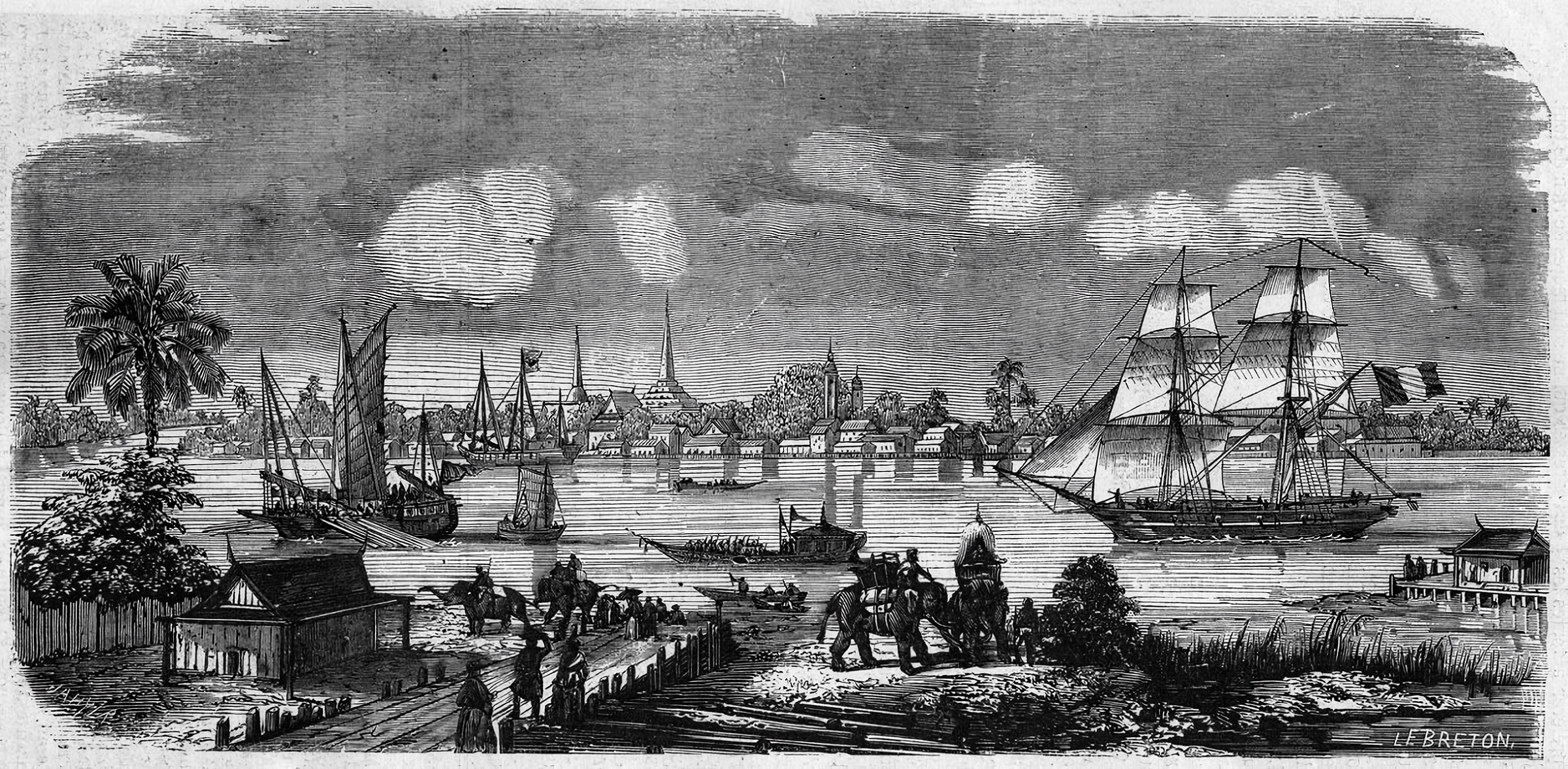
View of Bangkok City and Port in Siam 1858, Le Breton

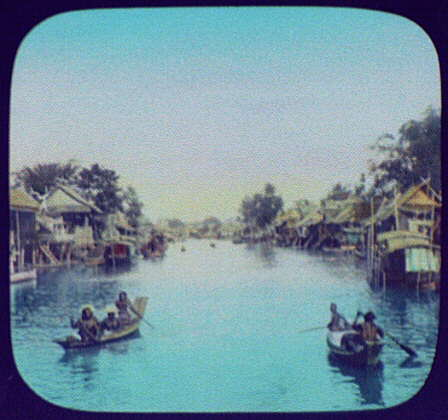
Bangkok - looking up river or canal, 1895

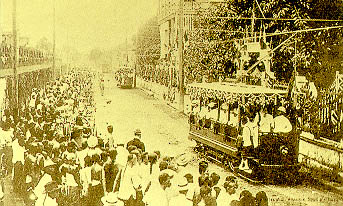
Tram in Bangkok, 1905

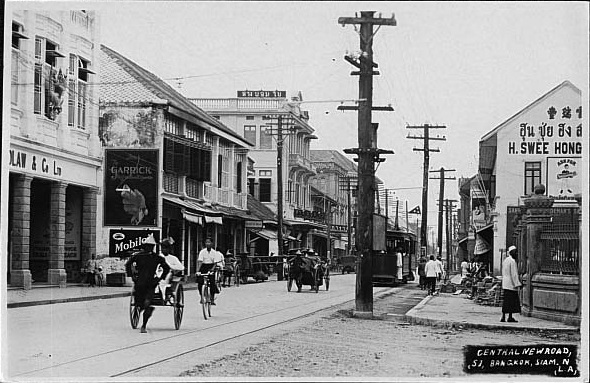
Postcard of Charoen Krung Road, c. 1910s–1920s

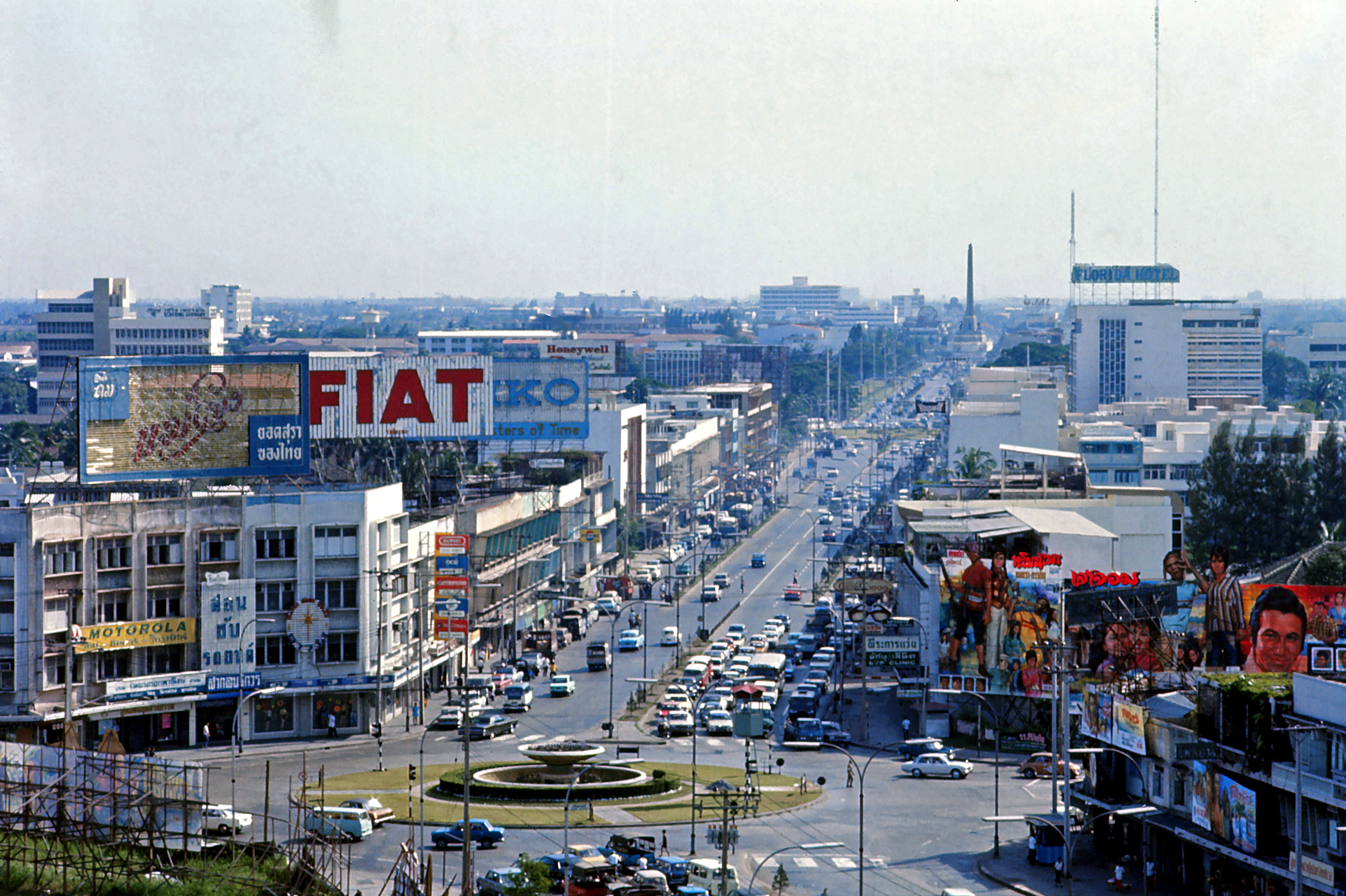
Bangkok in 1971

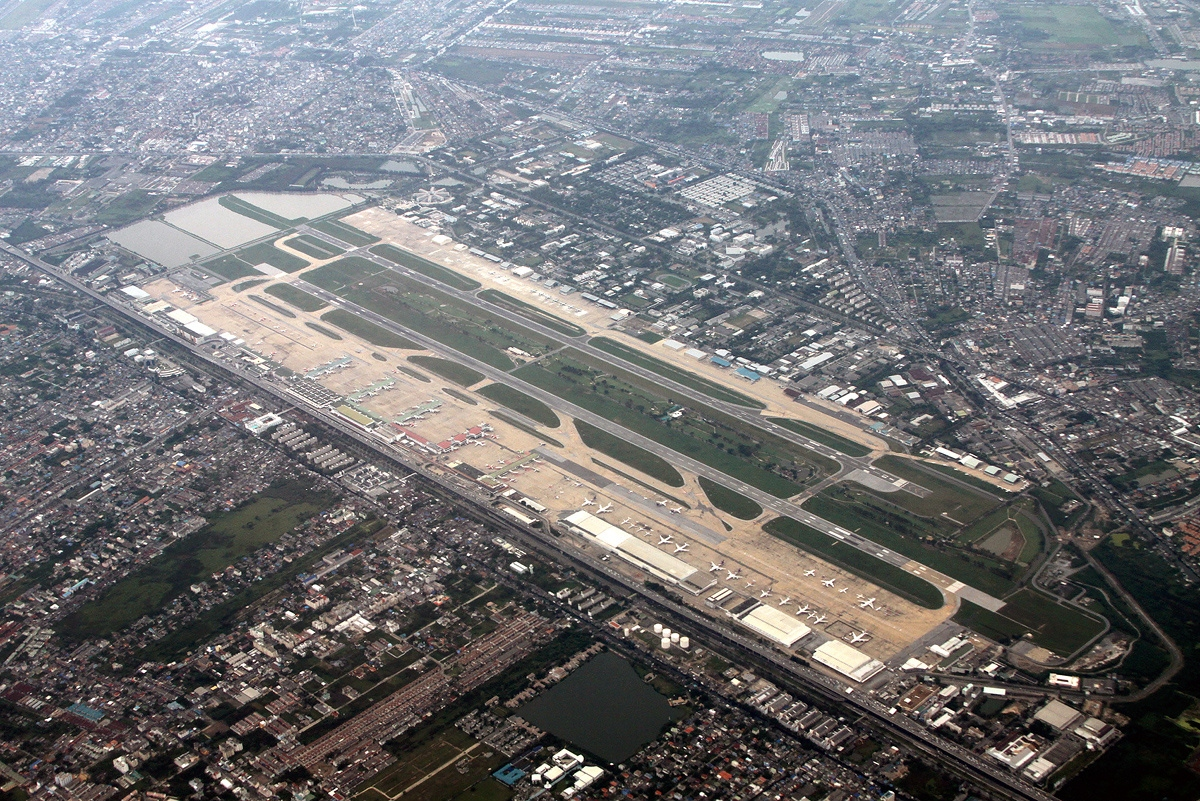
Don Mueang International Airport, the first airport in Bangkok and Thailand, opened in 1914

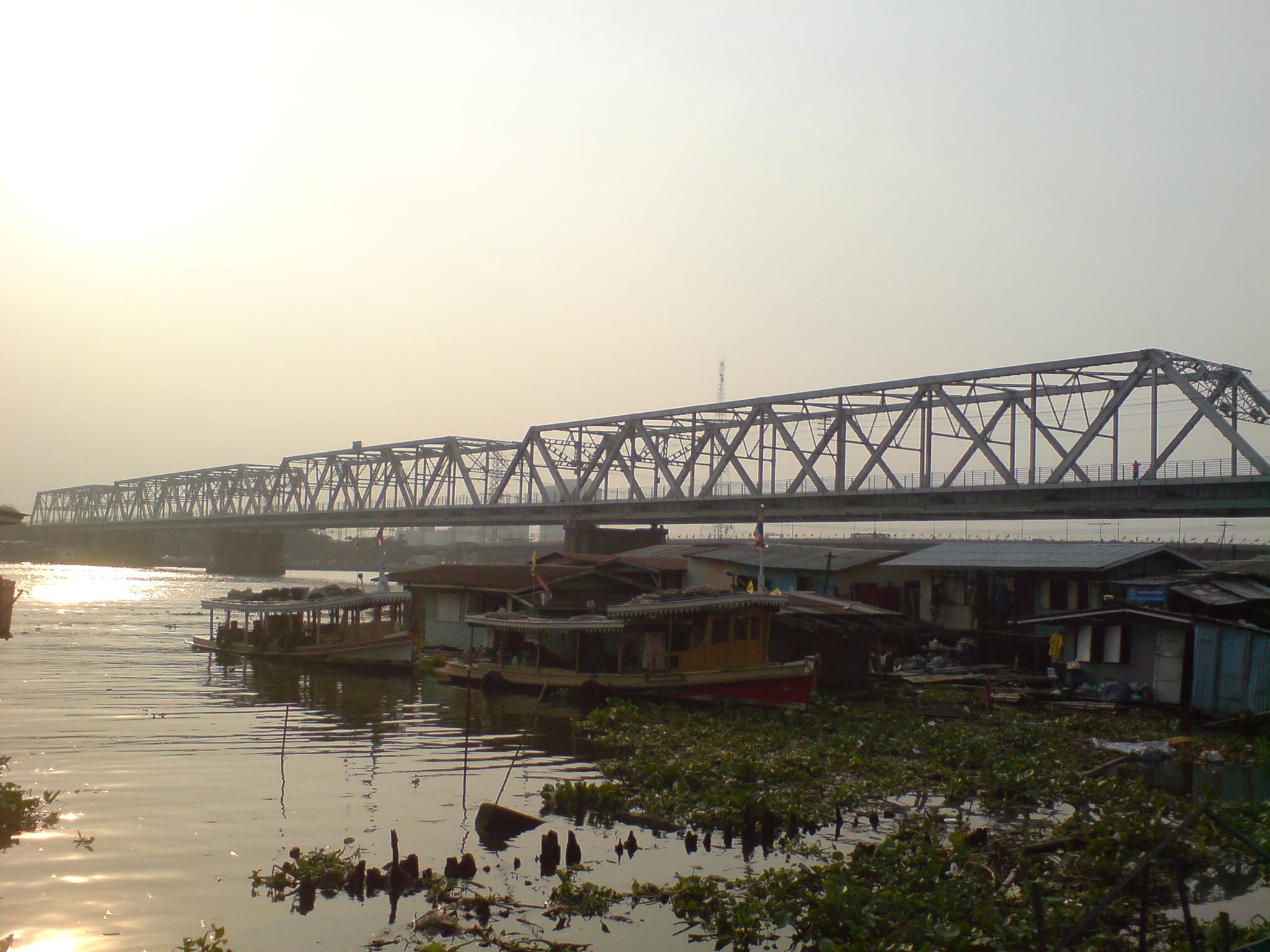
The Rama VI Bridge, the first bridge to cross the Chao Phraya River, opened in 1927

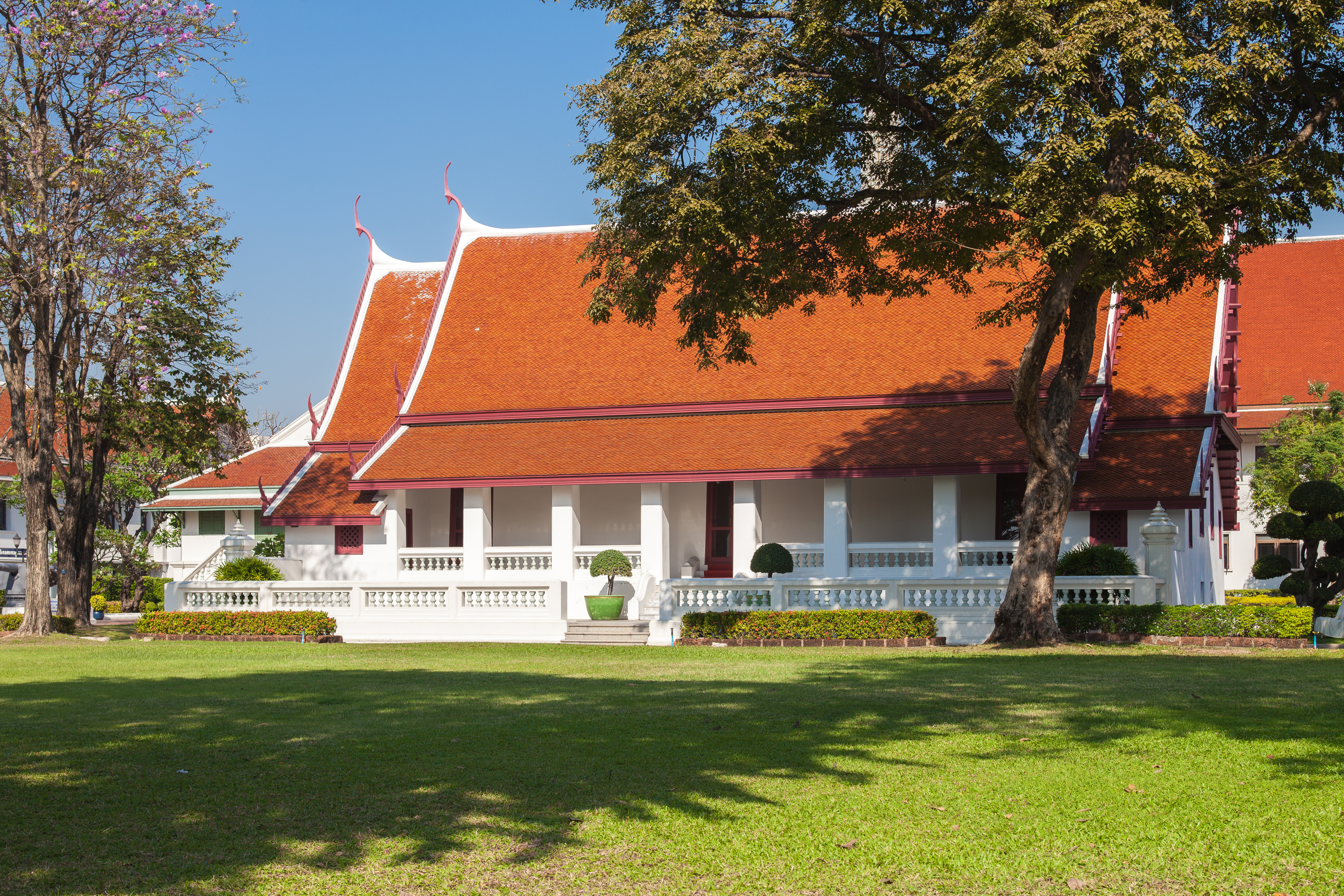
Thonburi Palace, the main royal residence of King Taksin, now used as the Royal Thai Navy's HQ

== See also ==
- History of Thailand
- Siege of Bangkok
- Fortifications of Bangkok
- Bombing of Bangkok in World War II
