= Phra Nakhon (disambiguation) =

Phra Nakhon district is a present-day district of Bangkok, Thailand.

Phra Nakhon may also refer to:

- Phra Nakhon province or Changwat Phra Nakhon, the administrative division covering the eastern side of Bangkok until its merger with Thonburi Province to form the present-day Bangkok special administrative area in 1971; see History of Bangkok
- Phra Nakhon, a term referring to the entire eastern side of Bangkok
- Phra Nakhon, the Thai name of Angkor, the ancient Khmer capital
