= Battle of Bangkok =

Battle of Bangkok may refer to:

- Siege of Bangkok, the 1688 siege of the French fortress in Bangkok by Siamese forces
- Military encounter at Samut Prakan in 1941, see Japanese invasion of Thailand
- 1933 Battle of Bangkok, see Boworadet Rebellion
- 1893 French Siege of Bangkok, see Paknam incident
- 2010 Thai military crackdown, the military crackdown on the anti-government Red Shirt protesters in Bangkok
