= Du royaume de Siam =

Du royaume de Siam, translated into English as A New Historical Relation of the Kingdom of Siam, is a travel record of a French diplomatic mission to Siam written by Simon de la Loubère and published in 1691. It extensively describes the Ayutthaya Kingdom at the end of reign of King Narai in 1687, and is among the most important Western sources in the historiography of Ayutthaya.

Although La Loubère only stayed in Ayutthaya for 3 months and 6 days, the record is based on the compilation and research of books written by westerners who had come to Ayutthaya before such as Jeremias van Vliet who came to Ayutthaya in the early reign of King Prasat Thong, however, the observations of modern historians see that, some of the content in this document some of the stories are inaccurate some are recorded from inquiries from without knowledge people some are heard from statements that are true and some are not true some are speculated by the author or misrepresented.

== Content ==
Simon de la Loubère set sail from the port of Brest on 1 March 1687, arrived in Ayutthaya on 30 September 1687, arrived back in France on 3 January. 1688, landed at the harbor of Brest on 27 July 1688 or at the early reign of King Phetracha.

The purpose of writing in an encyclopedic manner which consists of many sub-headings by describing abundance soil quality for agriculture climate first subsequently, it is a tradition in general including vocabulary or pronouns to refer to various people that people in Siam used at that time. The subject is divided into different categories, and specific topics on government and religion are discussed at the end, and has compiled the memoirs about Ayutthaya that to him has brought to be appended at the end, and for readers to get to know the people of Siam clearly he therefore brought together knowledge about India and China in many respects.
