= Marshal Desfarges =

French general active in Siam (d. 1690)

Marshal Desfarges, also spelled Des Farges (died 1690), was a French general of the 17th century who took an important role in French efforts at establishing a presence in Siam (modern Thailand).

Desfarges led two battalions (636 soldiers) on board five warships, in the second French embassy to Siam. The embassy to King Narai, under the special envoys Simon de la Loubère and Claude Céberet du Boullay, left France for Siam in March 1687. Desfarges had instructions to establish French troops in Mergui and Bangkok, if necessary by force.

The disembarkment of Desfarges troops in Bangkok and the troops of his officer du Bruant in Mergui led to strong nationalistic movements in Siam directed by Phra Petratcha and ultimately resulted in the 1688 Siamese revolution in which King Narai died, Constantine Phaulkon was executed, and Phra Petratcha became king.

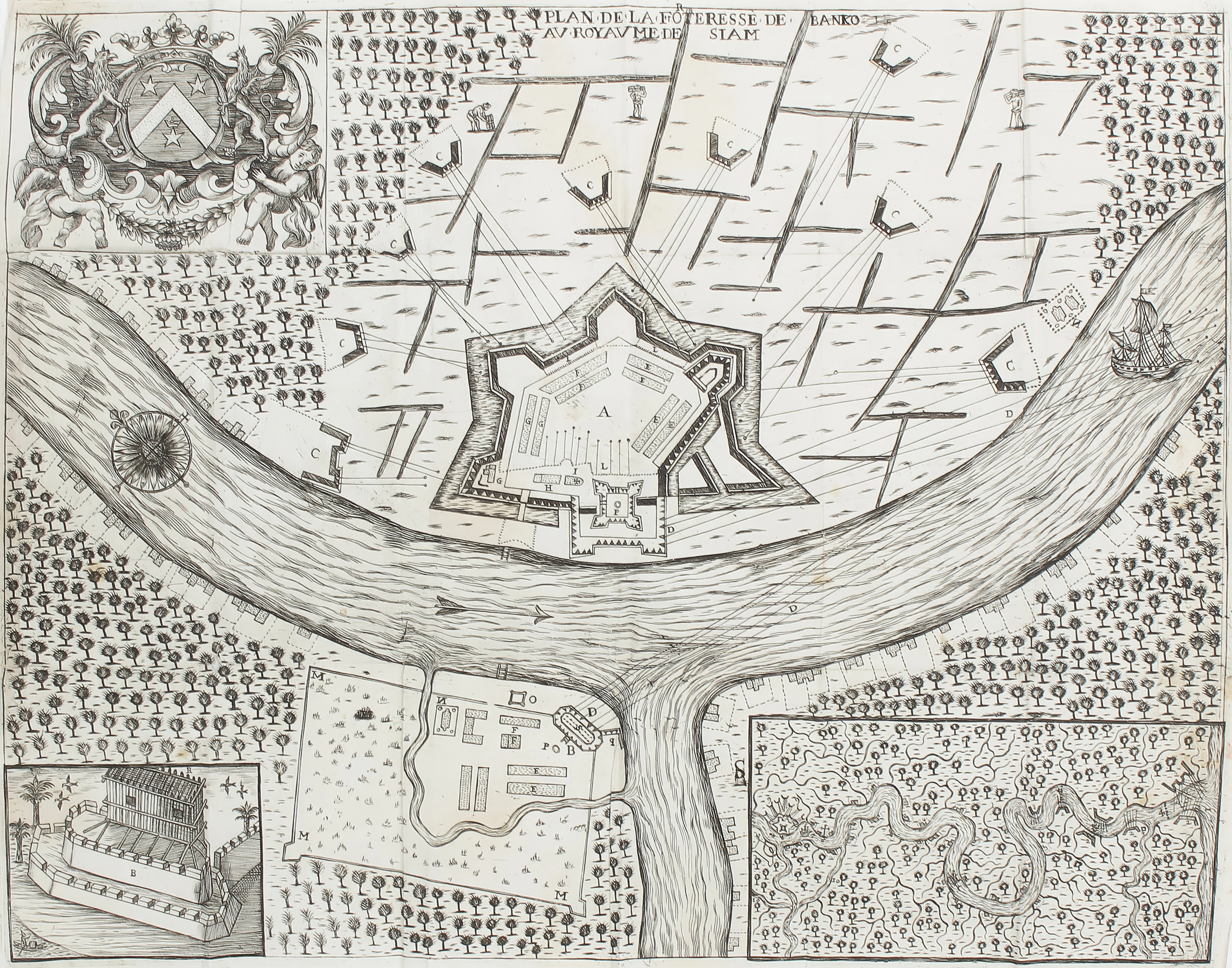
Desfarges survived a four-month siege by the Siamese (C) in the French fortress (A) in Bangkok, in 1688.

Desfarges, when he learned of the crisis, started to move his troops to the capital Lopburi at the request of Phaulkon, but then retreated back to Bangkok when he learned of the king's death on 11 July 1688. Phaulkon was arrested, tortured and executed by the insurgents. In June, the French troops in Mergui had to be evacuated, and in September, Desfarges, besieged in Bangkok, negotiated for his troops to be evacuated to Pondicherry after the four month Siege of Bangkok. He had, however, to leave his two sons and the Roman Catholic Bishops of the country as hostages.

In the latter part of 1689, Desfarges captured the island of Phuket in an attempt to restore French control.

Desfarges finally returned to Pondicherry with his men in February 1690. Part of his troops remained in Pondicherry to strengthen the French presence there.

Desfarges left in March 1690, but died of illness on his way back to France on board the Oriflamme. He was widely attacked for his role in the Siamese debacle. His own version of the events was published anonymously in 1691.

The French commander Abraham Duquesne-Guiton would be involved with Siam in 1691.

== See also ==
- France-Thailand relations
