= Phetracha =

Ruler of the Ayutthaya Kingdom from 1688 to 1703

Phetracha เพทราชา
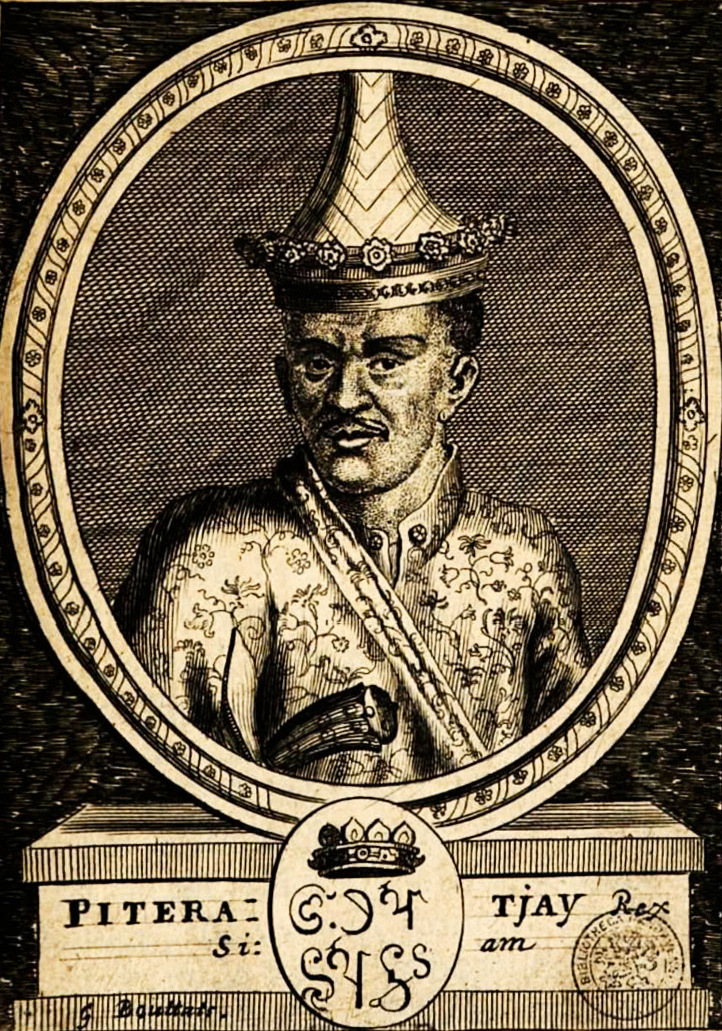
- Engraving of King Phetracha by Gaspar Bouttats, 1690

King of Ayutthaya
- Reign: 1 August 1688 – 5 February 1703
- Predecessor: Narai
- Successor: Suriyenthrathibodi
- Viceroy: Sorasak
- Born: 1632
- Died: 5 February 1703 (aged 70–71); Ayutthaya Kingdom
- Consorts: Kan, Princess Thephamat; Sudawadi, Princess Yothathep; Si Suphan, Princess Yothathip; Kusawadi of Chiang Mai
- Issue: Trat Noi; Phra Khwan; Suriyenthrathibodi; Chim; Chin; Dam; Kaeo; Bunnak
- Dynasty: Ban Phlu Luang
- Religion: Buddhism

Phetracha (alternative spellings: Bedraja, P'etraja, Petraja, Petratcha; also called Phra Phetracha; Thai: เพทราชา, pronounced [pʰêːt.rāː.t͡ɕʰāː]; 1632– 5 February 1703) or King Mahaburut Wisutdetchaudom (สมเด็จพระมหาบุรุษวิสุทธิเดชอุดม, RTGS: Somdet Phra Mahaburut Wisutdetchaudom) or Phra Song Tham (พระทรงธรรม์) (Note: The name "Phra Trong Than" appears in a letter by Aernout Cleur, an officer of the Dutch East India Company (VOC), stating: "Relaas van ’t voorgevallene by de ziekte en overlyden van den Siamse koning Phra Trong Than genaamt" and "...Sickness and Death of the Siamese King Named Phra Trong Than [Phetracha] is based on a story told by an unnamed courtier.") or King Thadathibet (สมเด็จพระธาดาธิเบศร์) born Thongkham (ทองคำ), was the king of the Ayutthaya Kingdom from 1688 to 1703 and the founder of the Ban Phlu Luang dynasty, the final ruling house of Ayutthaya. Originally a high-ranking official and Director-General of the Royal Department of Elephants under King Narai, he rose to power by orchestrating the Siamese revolution of 1688. Upon Narai's death, Phetracha seized the throne, executed the late king's heirs, and consolidated his legitimacy by marrying Narai's only daughter. His reign marked a decisive shift in Siamese foreign policy; he moved to expel French influence from the kingdom, leading to the Siege of Bangkok and the withdrawal of French troops. Consequently, diplomatic ties with the West were significantly reduced for decades. Phetracha's rule, however, was frequently destabilized by internal rebellions and political unrest from factions remains loyal to the previous dynasty.

== Background ==
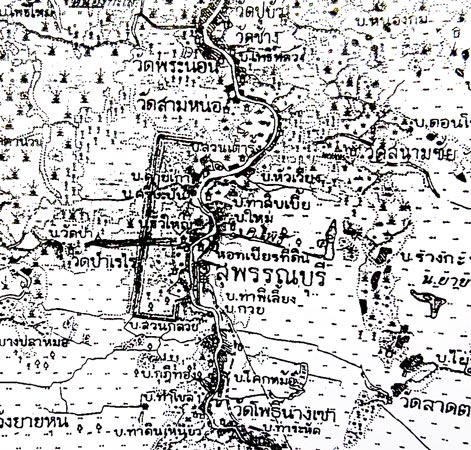
Ban Pho Luang (later known as Ban Phlu Luang), located north of the city of Suphan Buri, on a map produced during the reign of King Rama V.

Phetracha was originally an elephant trainer from Ban Phlu Luang in Suphan Buri, his rise to prominence was tied to his family's close relationship with the monarchy. His mother, Phra Nom Prem, served as the wet nurse to King Narai; consequently, Phetracha was raised alongside Narai from childhood. His younger sister, Si Chulalak (Chaem), was also a primary consort of King Narai the Great.

Phetracha began his royal service in the Royal Department of Elephants, eventually becoming its Director-General (Jangwang). Due to his distinguished military service and merit, he earned the deep trust of King Narai and rose to high-ranking positions within the court. He ultimately served as the Samuha Phra Kotchaban (Director-General of the Royal Department of Elephants, Right Division), a position of considerable power and influence in King Narai's administration at the time. Hence, he was sometimes referred to as "the Elephant Prince".

Although Thai historians recorded that Phetracha was not interested in being King, Jesuit missionaries stated otherwise, that he was an ambitious man. While this matter is ambiguous, it is generally agreed that he was a very influential figure in that period, harboring respect from many officers. It is also said that he strongly believed in Buddhism, thus gaining support from many monks, who feared Ayutthaya kingdom was being converted to Christianity. Moreover, Phetracha seemed to gain King Narai's trust as well, as he was one of King Narai's close aides and confidants. When the royal palace at Lopburi was finished, King Narai would stay there for many months in a year, leaving Phetracha as regent to take care of matters in Ayutthaya.

Phetracha's rivalry with counsellor Constantine Phaulkon is understandable. While Phaulkon's ideology was to open Ayutthaya kingdom to the international community (and benefit from the expansion of foreign trading), Phetracha was a traditionalist who was allegedly disgusted by international influence in Ayutthaya kingdom. King Narai himself favored the opening of his country and created many diplomatic ties with European countries, notably France.

== Personality ==
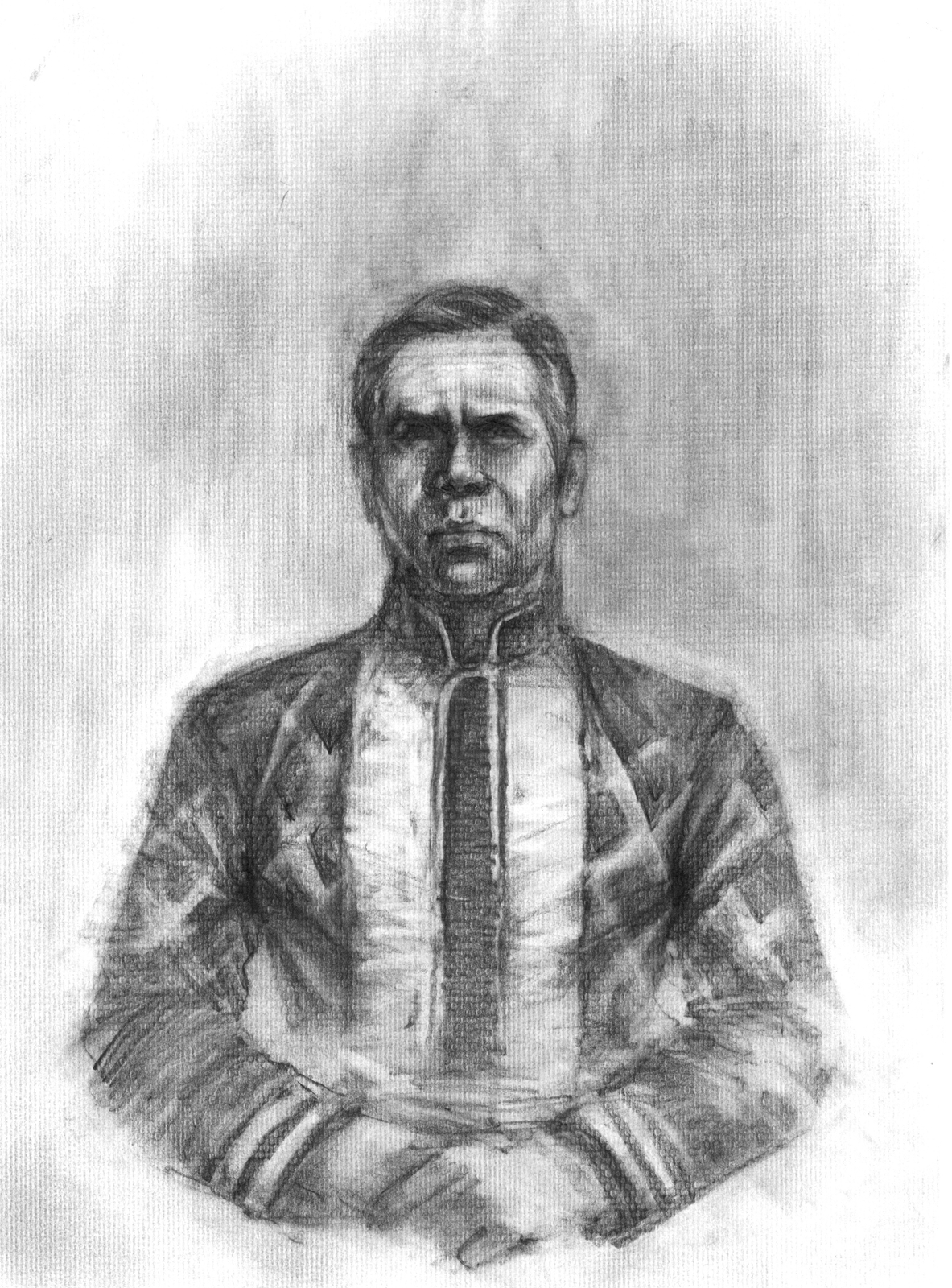
Phetracha (aged 56), an artist's impression by M. Worapinit based on a mural painting at Wat Yom, Ayutthaya.

Simon de La Loubère, the special envoy of the French embassy to the Ayutthaya Kingdom in 1687 during the late reign of King Narai the Great, recorded the characteristics of Ok-Phra Phetracha as follows:

"...Oc-Pra Pipitcharatcha : who though he has only the Title of Oc-Pra, is yet a very great Lord. The people love him becauſe he appears modetate ; and think him invulnerable, becauſe he expreſſed a great deal of Courage in ſome Fight againſt the Pegains : his Courage has likewiſe procur'd him the Favour of the King his Maſter. His Family has continued a long time in the higheſt Offices: is ſtequently allied to the Crown; and is it publickly repotted that he or his Son Oc-Louang Souracac may pretend to it, if either of them ſurvive the King that now Reigns."

— Simon de La Loubère, Du Royaume de Siam (1691)

Prince Narathip Praphanphong later translated this account into Thai, stating:

"Ok-Phra Pipitcharatcha, who, although only holding the title of Ok-Phra, possesses immense power and prestige. The common people deeply love and respect him because he is kind and humble. They consider him to be knowledgeable, exceptionally clever, and highly respectable because he knows how to win the hearts of the troops and is courageous. His martial prowess was evident during the Mon campaign (Note: The Royal Chronicles mention that Phetracha only engaged in the Chiang Mai campaign. Regarding the Mon campaign, it is suggested that he might have fought alongside Chao Phraya Kosathibodi (Lek) against the Burmese-Mon forces, and when the Burmese advanced, they submitted.) This bravery in battle earned him the utmost mercy and profound trust of the King. Ok-Phra Phetracha's family has served in high-ranking state positions for many generations, maintaining various connections to the throne to the point where it is widely rumored, almost openly, that either he or his son, Ok-Luang Sorasak, might claim the throne should either survive the reigning King."

— Narathip Praphanphong (Translator), La Loubère's Chronicles, Vol. 2 (1962)

In the Prachum Phongsawadan (Collected Historical Documents), the episode concerning Kosa Pan's embassy to France aligns with La Loubère's records:

"Ok-Phra Phetracha is a senior nobleman highly favored by the people due to his calm demeanor. He is rumored to possess invulnerability to weapons. (Note: Known in Thai culture as Khongkrapan (or Khongkrapan Chatri), this refers to a traditional occult belief in magical invulnerability. It is believed that individuals possessing this protection are impervious to physical injuries caused by blades, sharp objects, and projectile weapons.) Even King Narai heavily favors him, as he once fought victoriously against the King of Taungoo. [...] According to market rumors widely discussed today, it is believed that whenever King Narai passes away, Ok-Phra Phetracha and his son, Ok-Luang Sorasak, have the highest prospect of succeeding the throne over anyone else. [...] Ok-Phra Phetracha's mother was formerly a wet nurse to the current King, similar to the mother of the Chief Ambassador, who also nursed His Majesty."

— Prachum Phongsawadan Volume 33 (1969)

The memoirs of Claude de Forbin, a French naval officer who served during the reign of King Narai the Great, describe Ok-Phra Phetracha as follows:

"I knew this man well; although he was middle-aged, he possessed the strength and agility of his youth. He was prudent and conducted himself appropriately for all occasions. He had gained the Buddhist monks as his allies and persuaded other nobles by flattering their ambitions, promising them roles in governing the country. He did not merely win over the nobles; he also won the hearts of the common people. The populace, always fond of novelties and strange things, hoped that under a new master, the rule would not be so strict."

— Claude de Forbin, Mémoires du comte de Forbin (Translated by Prince Damras Damrong Devakula, 1966)

The accounts of Bishop Pierre Brigot state:

Although Phetracha was small in stature, he had a lofty spirit and an engaging appearance. Even at the age of 56, he was widely known and beloved by his subordinates. However, with his enemies, he always maintained a guarded posture. He was raised in a manner akin to a monarch. The King's happiness was inspired by the well-being of the people. His loyalty was laced with a cunning intellect; through this cunning, he might express dissatisfaction with the King over His Majesty's faults or those of his ministers, whom he would severely retaliate against with the actions of power-hungry individuals, all while attempting to conceal his malicious intentions.

— Pierre Brigot, Bishop of Tabarka, and Apostolic Vicar. Compiled by François-Henri Turpin in 1770, History of the Kingdom of Siam by Turpin, Translated by Somsri Iamtham (1979)

== Reign ==
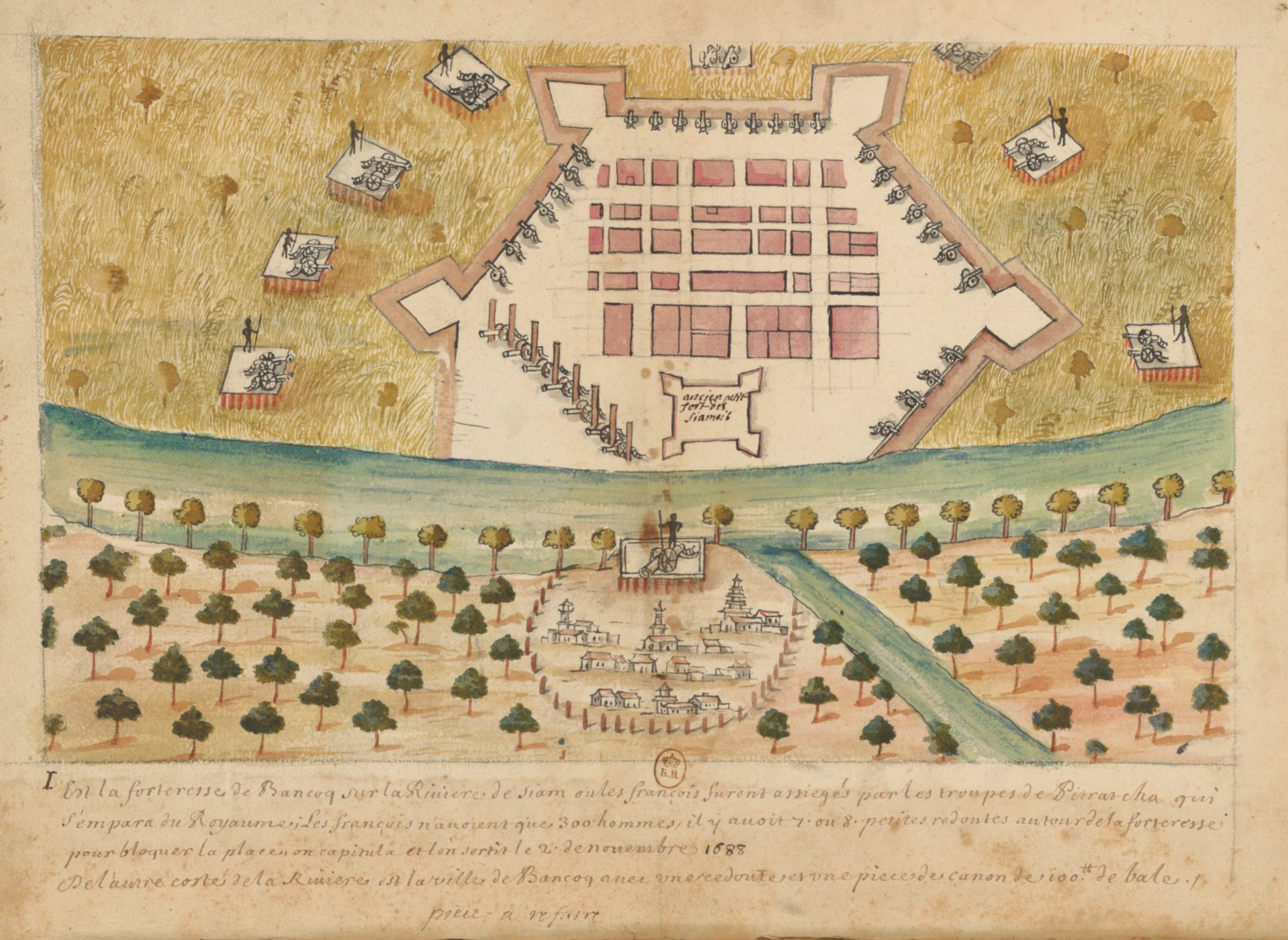
Siamese troops besieging the Wichayen Fort, which was held by French forces during the revolution led by Phetracha in 1688.

When Narai was seriously ill with no hope of recovery, on 18 May 1688 Phetracha had a successful coup and arrested Narai himself, his half-brothers Prince Aphaithot and Prince Noi, and his adopted son Phra Pi. Phaulkon was summoned to the palace, there he and the French officers were surrounded and disarmed. Phaulkon was thrown to the palace dungeon and brutally tortured.

After questioning Phra Pi, he discovered Phra Pi had conspired with Phaulkon to assume the throne, and Phra Pi was executed on 20 May. Further questioning of Phaulkon revealed a plot to raise a rebellion, and he too was executed by Phetracha's son Luang Sorasak on 5 June. Narai, on his deathbed, was unable to do anything, except curse Phetracha and his son. Luang Sorasak then had Prince Aphaithot and Prince Noi executed.

Phetracha soon ordered his troops to attack the French troops led by General Desfarges at the start of Siege of Bangkok. On the death of Narai on 11 July, Phetracha proclaimed himself king, he appointed Luang Sorasak, his son as the Prince Viceroy and Nai Chopkhotchaprasit, the officer under his department and who helped contending the throne as the Prince Deputy Viceroy, and gave regalia as Prince Deputy Viceroy rank with Khun Ongkharaksa and promoted to Chaophraya Surasongkhram, because of the credit to helped contending the throne too.

After withholding the siege for four months and later a negotiated settlement, the French soldiers were allowed to return to France. Only Dutchmen were allowed to trade in the capital before the French and English finally ended their dispute with Siam.

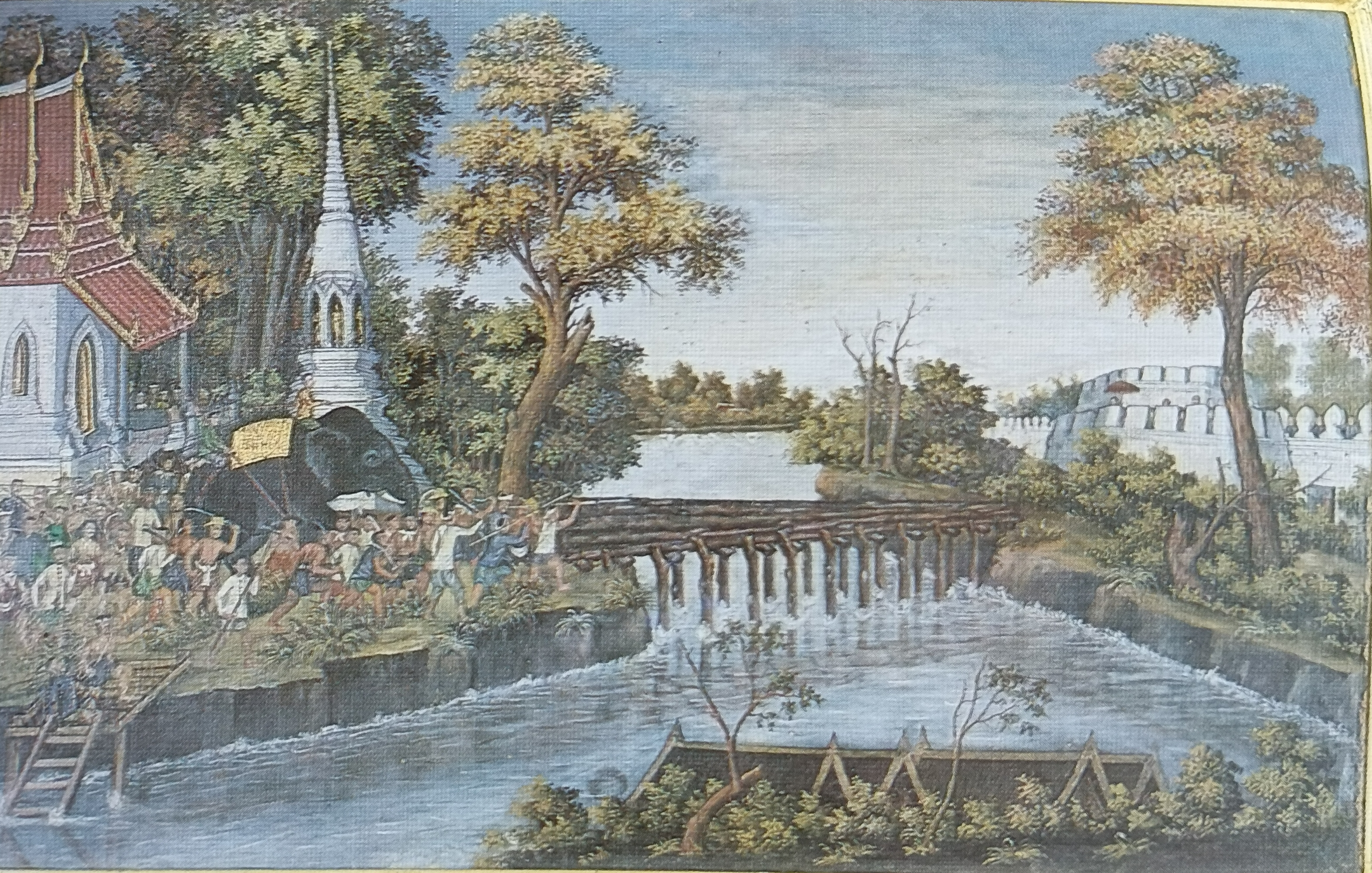
Thammathien Rebellion in 1690.

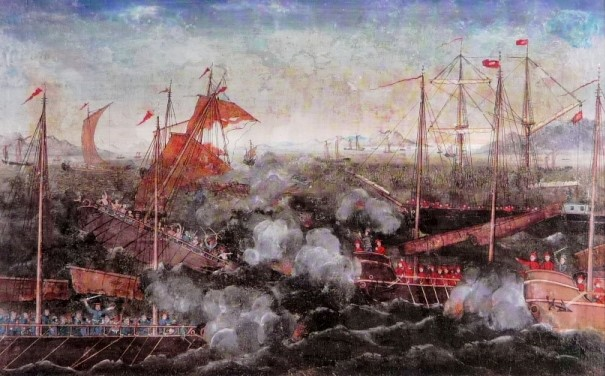
Naval battle of Petracha's army against defiant governor in Nakhon Si Thammarat in 1691.

Although Phetracha's overthrow of King Narai was driven by the desire to expel the French and establish more equitable foreign relations, he did not pursue total isolationism; instead, he maintained cordial ties with the Dutch, reaffirming their trade monopolies on deerskin and tin through envoys to Batavia. His fifteen-year reign was plagued by chronic instability and rebellions due to his status as a usurper, including the Thammathien uprising and significant two-year military campaigns against defiant governors in Nakhon Ratchasima and Nakhon Si Thammarat.

To address these internal threats, he restructured the administration by dividing the northern and southern provinces under the Samuhanayok and Samuhaphrakalahom—granting both ministers civil and military authority—and bolstered the troops of the Front Palace to improve royal security. Despite this domestic unrest, Ayutthaya remained a regional power, receiving white elephant tributes from Cambodia and successfully mediating a peace between Vientiane and Luang Prabang after the former sought Siamese military assistance.

Upon his death on 5 February 1703, Phetracha was succeeded by his eldest son Sorasak, who took the title of Suriyenthrathibodi.

== Death ==
King Phetracha died on 5 February 1703. He assumed the name of "pra throng than" which means God of Wisdom. The king was cremated nearly 22 months later on 26 December 1704. The drawing of this scroll was done by an expert Siamese artist.

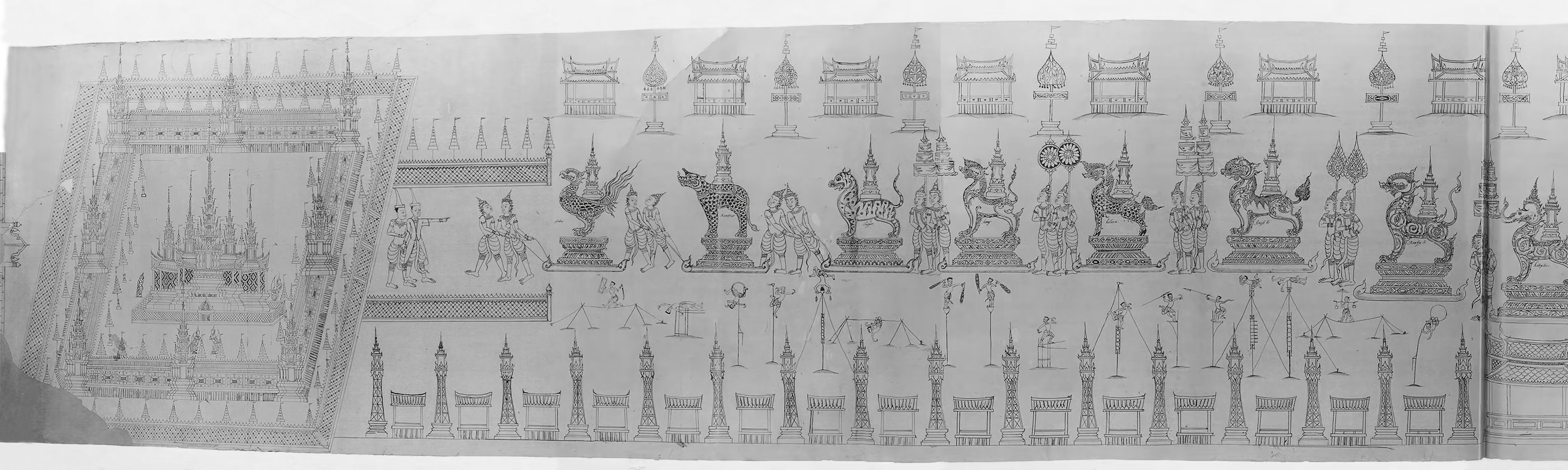
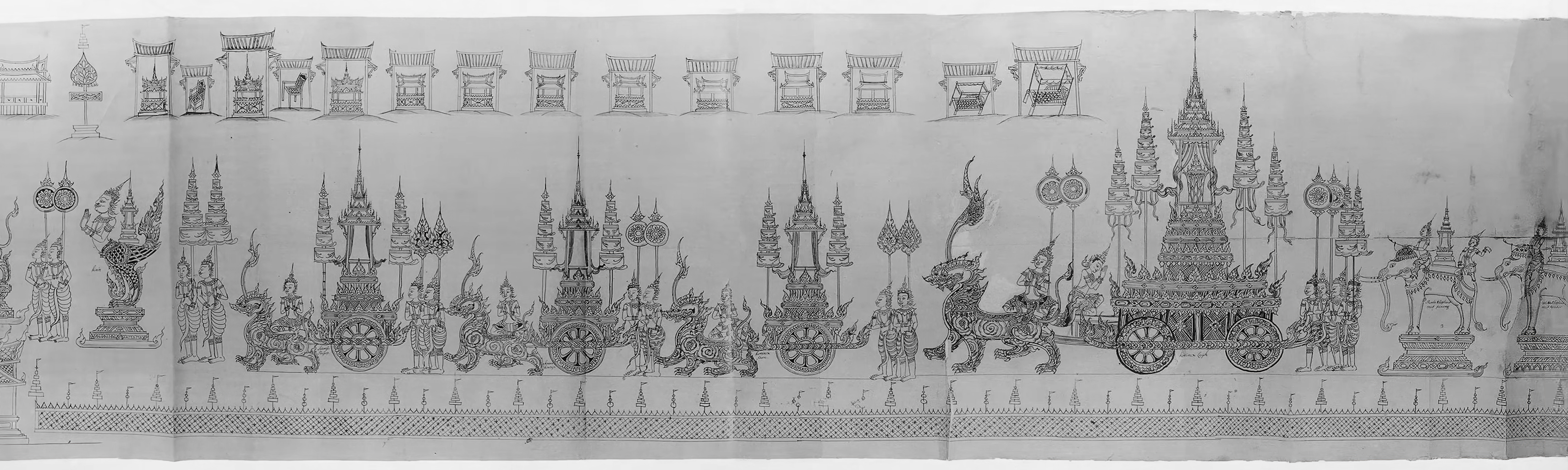
Royal funeral of King Phetracha in 1704 scroll

== Issue ==
#	Consort and Concubines	Children
1.	Kan, Princess Thephamat	None
2.	Sudawadi, Princess Yothathep	Prince Trat Noi
3.	Si Suphan, Princess Yothathip	Prince Phra Khwan
4.	Princess Kusawadi of Chiang Mai	Prince Ma Duea (Suriyenthrathibodi)
5.	Others	Princess Chim; Princess Chin; Prince Dam; Prince Kaeo; Prince Bunnak

== Honors ==
=== Title ===
==== Titles and ranks appointed by King of Siam ====
- Oc Phra Phetracha or Oc-Prá Pipitcharatcha (Thai: ออกพระเพทราชา or ออกพระพิพิธราชา) Chancellor of department Elephants Affairs in the reign of King Narai with sakdina 5000.
- Chaophraya Surasi Acting Chancellor of the Ministry of Defence in the reign of King Narai.

==== Enthronement ====
- Somdet Phra Phetracha (Thai: สมเด็จพระมหาบุรุษ วิสุทธิเดชอุดม บรมจักรพรรดิศร บรมนาถบพิตร สมเด็จพระพุทธเจ้าอยู่หัว) King of Siam of the Ban Phlu Luang Dynasty.

=== Namesakes ===
- Phetracha Road. Lopburi province.
- Phra Phetracha auditorium. Thepsatri Rajabhat University Lopburi province.

== In popular culture ==
King Phetracha's corporeal presence was mentioned in:

=== Thai literature ===
- Chronicle of Phan Chanthanumat records the history of Phetracha's reign

=== International literature ===
- Louis XIV et le Siam the French-Siamese historical fiction composed by Dirk Van der Cruysse. Phetracha was mentioned of troublemaker in the French embassy parade.
- Pour la plus grande gloire de Dieu composed by Morgan Sportès. Phetracha was crowned king of Siam in the reign of King Narai.
- Phaulkon the adventurer (1862) composed by William Dalton. The fiction mentioned Phetracha who was crowned king of Siam and executed Constantine Phaulkon.
- Le Ministre des moussons the French-Siamese historical fiction composed by Claire Keefe-Fox mentioned Phetracha during the ousting of French forces in 1688.

=== Film and television ===
- Love Destiny (TV series) Phra Phetracha was King Narai's regent cast by Sarut Vijittranon.
- OM! Crush on me (2021) Thai historical movie mentioned Phra Phetracha who was general director of department of Elephants Affairs.
- Sri Ayodhaya 2 King Phetracha cast by M.R. Mongkolchai Yugala.
- Love Destiny 2 (TV series) King Phetracha cast by Sarut Vijittranon.

== See also ==
- Ayutthaya Kingdom

== Notes ==
Phetracha Ban Phlu Luang dynasty Born: 1632 Died: 5 February 1703
Regnal titles
Preceded by Narai	King of Ayutthaya; 1688–1703	Succeeded by Suriyenthrathibodi
