= Pange lingua =

Pange lingua may refer to either of two Mediaeval Latin hymns:

- "Pange lingua gloriosi proelium certaminis" by Venantius Fortunatus, a.D. 570, extolling the triumph of the Cross (the Passion of Jesus Christ) and thus used during Holy Week. Fortunatus wrote it for a procession that brought a part of the true Cross to Queen Radegunda that year. The last stanza was not written by Fortunatus but was added later. When the hymn is used in the Liturgy of the Hours during Holy Week, it may be broken into smaller units: Lustra sex qui iam peregit; En acetum, fel, arundo; Crux fidelis inter omnes. This hymn is also sometimes found as Pange lingua gloriosi lauream certaminis
- "Pange lingua gloriosi corporis mysterium" by Thomas Aquinas, inspired by the above and written c. 1260, celebrating the Eucharist and used during Corpus Christi. This hymn has often been set to music

There is a charming legend that is hinted at in both hymns: the wood of the Cross upon which Jesus was crucified was taken from that tree which was the source of the fruit of the fall in the Garden of Eden, and when Adam died, according to the legend, Seth obtained from the Cherubim guarding the Garden a branch of the tree from which Eve ate the forbidden fruit, and then planted it at Golgotha, being so named because Adam was buried there. As time went on, the Ark of the Covenant, the pole upon which the bronze serpent was lifted, and other items were made from this tree.

== Musical settings ==
There are dozens of musical settings of the Aquinas, including a Josquin Mass (1514), a Bruckner motet (1868) and a Kodály hymn (1929). Charpentier alone wrote five settings:

- Pange lingua, motet for 3 voices, 2 treble instruments and bc H.58 (? mid-1670s)
- Pange lingua, motet for 3 voices, 2 treble instruments and bc H.61 (1680–81)
- Pange lingua, motet for soloists, chorus, flutes, strings and bc H.64 (? late 1680s)
- Pange lingua, motet for 4 voices and bc H.68 (? late 1680s)
- Pange lingua, motet pour des religieuses / Pour le Port-Royal, for soloists, union chorus and bc H.62 (1681)

== See also ==
- Adoro te devote
- Veni Creator Spiritus
- Lauda Sion
- Sacris solemniis
- Verbum supernum prodiens
