= Didacticism =

Philosophy

Didacticism is a philosophy that emphasises instructional and informative qualities in literature, art, and design. In art, design, architecture, and landscape, didacticism is a conceptual approach that is driven by the urgent need to explain.

== Overview ==
The term has its origin in the Ancient Greek word διδακτικός (didaktikos), "pertaining to instruction", and signified learning in a fascinating and intriguing manner.

Didactic art was meant both to entertain and to instruct. Didactic plays, for instance, were intended to convey a moral theme or other rich truth to the audience. During the Middle Age, the Roman Catholic chants like the Veni Creator Spiritus, as well as the Eucharistic hymns like the Adoro te devote and Pange lingua are used for fixing within prayers the truths of the Roman Catholic faith to preserve them and pass down from a generation to another. In the Renaissance, the church began a syncretism between pagan and the Christian didactic art, a syncretism that reflected its dominating temporal power and recalled the controversy among the pagan and Christian aristocracy in the fourth century. An example of didactic writing is Alexander Pope's An Essay on Criticism (1711), which offers a range of advice about critics and criticism. An example of didacticism in music is the chant Ut queant laxis, which was used by Guido of Arezzo to teach solfege syllables.

Around the 19th century the term didactic came to also be used as a criticism for work that appears to be overburdened with instructive, factual, or otherwise educational information, to the detriment of the enjoyment of the reader (a meaning that was quite foreign to Greek thought). Edgar Allan Poe called didacticism the worst of "heresies" in his essay The Poetic Principle.

== See also ==
- Art for art's sake
- Autodidacticism
- John Cassell, 19th century publisher of educational magazines and books
- Children's literature
- Sebayt
- Wisdom literature
