= Adoro te devote =

Latin hymn by St. Thomas Aquinas

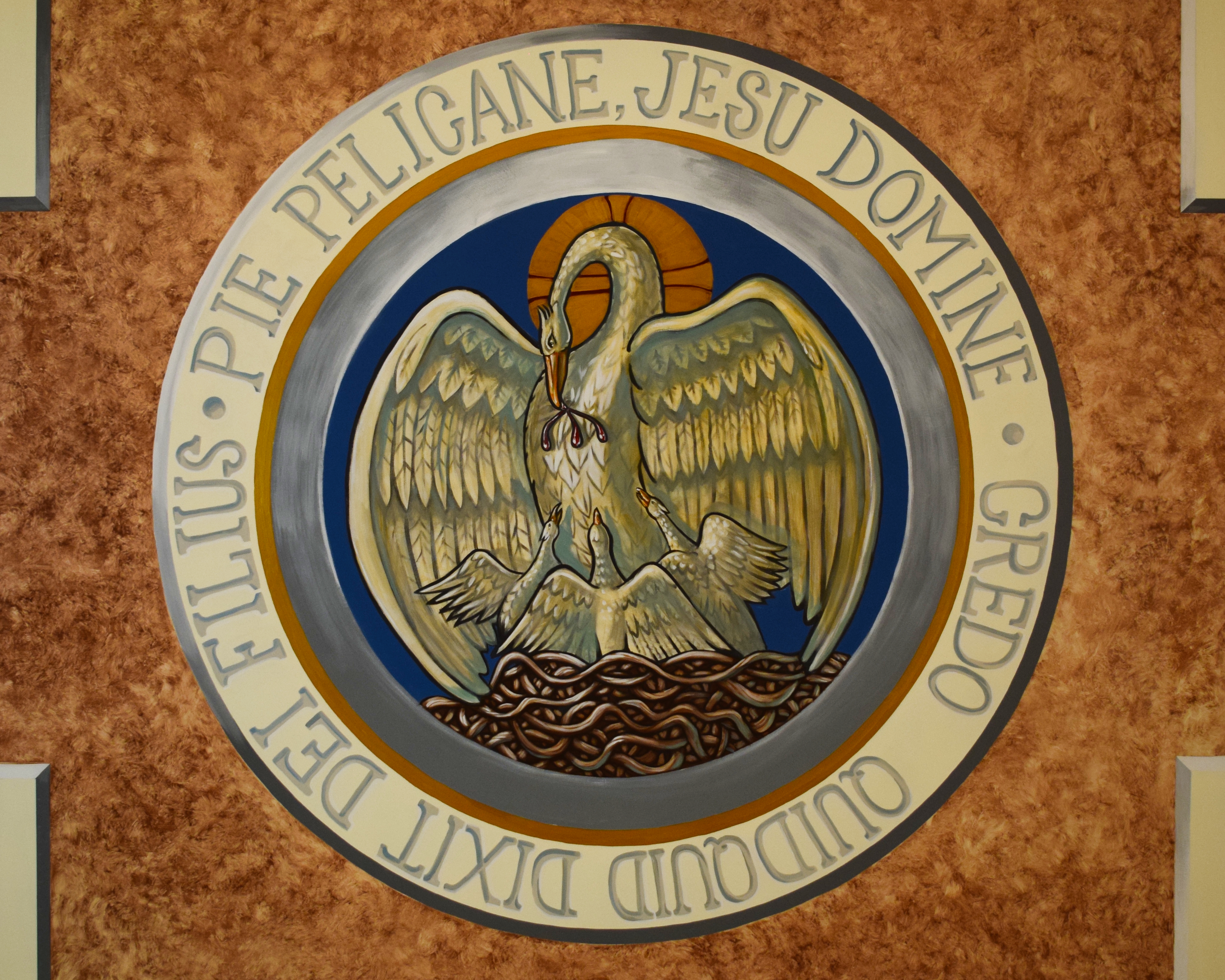
Text from "Adoro te devote" surrounding a medallion depicting the Pelican in her piety motif alluded to in the verse, in an Indiana church building.

"Adoro te devote" is a prayer written by Thomas Aquinas (c. 1225 – 7 March 1274). It was not written for a liturgical function and appears in no liturgical texts of the period; some scholars believe that it was written by the friar for private use at Mass. The text has since been incorporated into public worship as a hymn.

The authorship of the hymn by Thomas Aquinas was previously doubted by some scholars. More recent scholarship has put such doubts to rest. Thomas seems to have used it also as a private prayer, in daily adoration of the Blessed Sacrament.

Adoro te devote is one of the medieval poetic compositions, being used as spoken prayers and also as chanted hymns, which were preserved in the Roman Missal published in 1570 following the Council of Trent (1545–1563).

The hymn is still sung today, though its use is optional in the post-Vatican II ordinary form.

== Text and literal translation ==
Latin text	Literal English translation
Adoro te devote, latens deitas, Quæ sub his figuris vere latitas; Tibi se cor meum totum subjicit, Quia te contemplans totum deficit. Visus, tactus, gustus in te fallitur, Sed auditu solo tuto creditur. Credo quidquid dixit Dei Filius; Nil hoc verbo Veritátis verius. In Cruce latebat sola Deitas, At hic latet simul et Humanitas, Ambo tamen credens atque confitens, Peto quod petivit latro pœnitens. Plagas, sicut Thomas, non intueor: Deum tamen meum te confiteor. Fac me tibi semper magis credere, In te spem habere, te diligere. O memoriale mortis Domini, Panis vivus, vitam præstans homini, Præsta meæ menti de te vívere, Et te illi semper dulce sapere. Pie Pelicane, Jesu Domine, Me immundum munda tuo Sanguine: Cujus una stilla salvum facere Totum mundum quit ab omni scelere. Jesu, quem velatum nunc aspicio, Oro, fiat illud quod tam sitio: Ut te revelata cernens facie, Visu sim beátus tuæ gloriæ. Amen.	I devoutly adore you, hidden deity, Who are truly hidden beneath these appearances. My whole heart submits to You, because in contemplating You, it is fully deficient. Sight, touch, taste all fail in their judgment of you, But hearing suffices firmly to believe. I believe all that the Son of God has spoken; There is nothing truer than this word of Truth. On the cross only the divinity was hidden, But here the humanity is also hidden. Yet believing and confessing both, I ask for what the penitent thief asked. I do not see wounds as Thomas did, But I confess that You are my God. Make me believe much more in You, Hope in you, and love You. O memorial of our Lord's death, Living Bread that gives life to man, Grant my soul to live on You, And always to savor your sweetness. Lord Jesus, Good Pelican, clean me, the unclean, with Your Blood, One drop of which can heal the entire world of all its sins. Jesus, whom now I see hidden, I ask You to fulfill what I so desire: That the sight of Your Face being unveiled I may have the happiness of seeing Your glory. Amen.

There are two variant readings of the Latin text, with slightly different nuances to some of the words: "most of the variations occur in the first two verses. The substitution of the words "posset omni scélere" in place of "quit ab omni scélere" in the second-to-last verse and "cupio" for "sitio" in the closing one are practically the only other changes". This does not affect the overall meaning of the lines or stanzas so that "either variant may be legitimately used according to local custom".

== Poetic English translations ==
There have been at least 16 significant English translations of Adoro te devote, reflecting its popularity as a prayer and hymn, including versions by Edward Bouverie Pusey, Edward Caswall, and Gerard Manley Hopkins. There are also several popular hymns such as "Humbly We Adore Thee", which employ the 13th century Benedictine plainsong melody, but use modern texts not related to the Latin text.

== Liturgical use ==
The hymn is eucharistic in its content, but it was not written for a liturgical function and appears in no liturgical texts of the period, unlike some hymns which were composed and set to music for the Solemnity of Corpus Christi, instituted in 1264 by Pope Urban IV for the entire Latin Church, of the Catholic Church. It was added to the Roman Missal in 1570 by Pope Pius V, and also it has more quotations in the Catechism of the Catholic Church (n. 1381). The hymn was generally chanted with a genuflection in front of the Blessed Sacrament.

The hymn is typically used as an Eucharistic hymn and is sung either during the distribution of communion at Mass, or during the Benediction of the Blessed Sacrament.

There are modern musical settings and arrangements by Alexandre Guilmant (Offertoire sur Adoro te devote for organ, 1908), Cecilia McDowall (2016), Carlo Pedini (2021) and Healey Willan (chorale prelude, 1954).

== Final prayer ==
Until the first half of the nineteenth century, the (Eucharistic) chant Adoro te devote was often followed by this second thanksgiving prayer, addressing Jesus Christ God:

Latin text	An English translation
Obsecro Te, sancte Domine Jesu Christe, ut passio tua sit mihi virtus qua muniar atque defendar, vulnera tua sit mihi cibus potusque quibus pascar, inebrier atque delecter; aspersio sanguinis tui sit mihi ablutio omnium delictorum meorum; resurrectio tua sit mihi gloria sempiterna. In his sit mihi refectio, exultatio sanitas et dulcedo cordis mei. Qui vivis et regnas cum Patre in unitate Spiritus Sancti Deus per omnia sæcula sæculorum. Amen.	I beseech Thee, O holy Lord Jesus Christ, that Thy Passion may be unto me a strength wherewith I may be secured and defended; Thy wounds my food and drink wherein I may be nourished and delighted; the sprinkling of Thy Blood the ablution of all mine offenses; Thy Resurrection mine everlasting glory. Let there be in these gifts my renewal, exultation, health, and sweetness of my heart. Who livest and reignest with the Father in the unity of the Holy Ghost God, throughout all ages of ages. Amen.

On 13 December 1849, Pope Pius IX stated a period of 3 years of indulgence. Partial indulgence remains in force even after the suppression of the prayer from the 1969 missal.

== See also ==
- Trinitarian indwelling
- Veni Creator Spiritus
- Lauda Sion
- Pange Lingua
- Sacris solemniis
- Verbum supernum prodiens
