= Deinem Heiland, deinem Lehrer =

Catholic procession hymn

- Catholic procession hymn
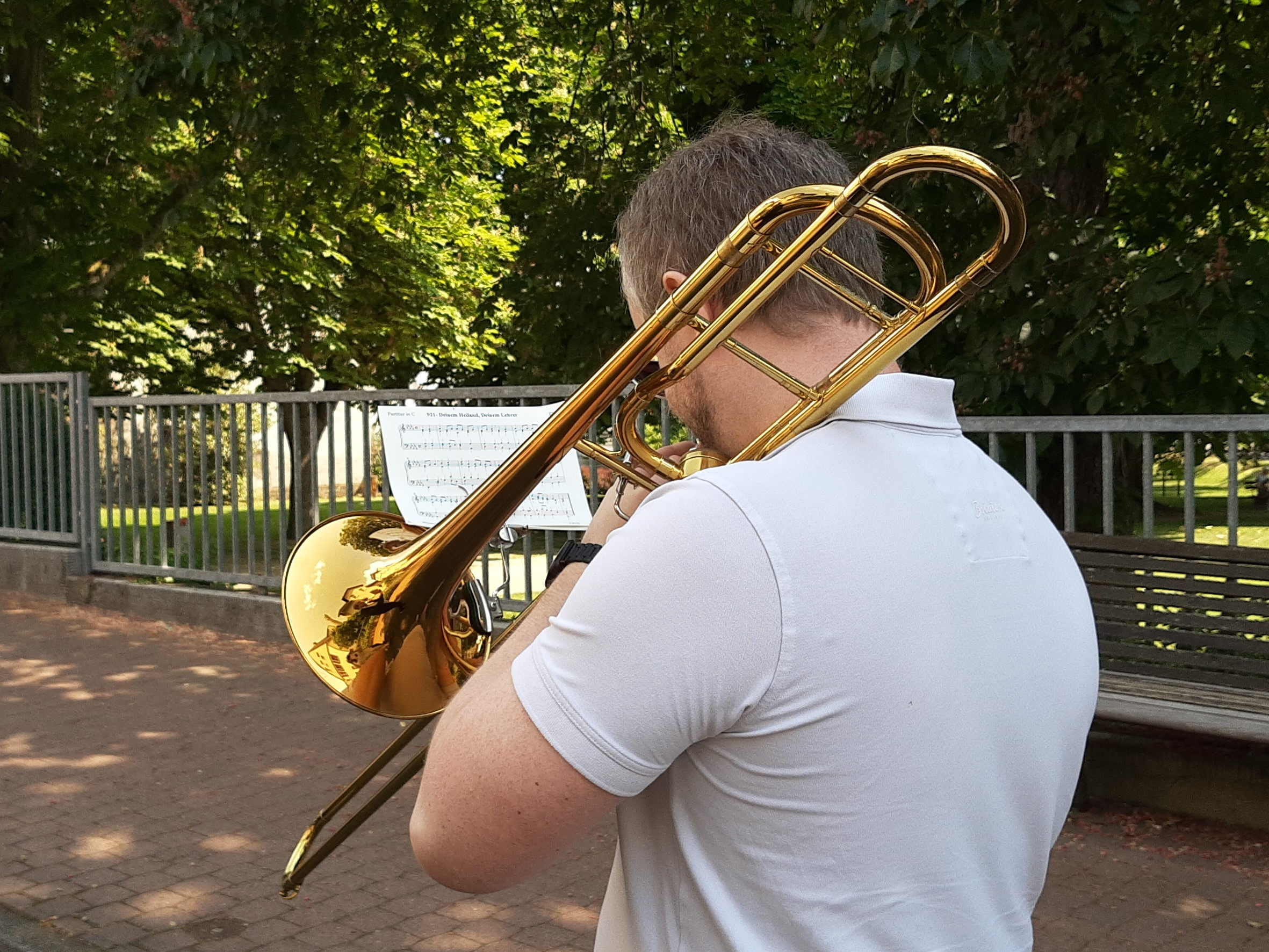
- Trombonist playing the hymn in a procession for Corpus Christi
- English: "To your Saviour, your teacher"
- Occasion: Corpus Christi
- Text: by Franz Xaver Riedel
- Language: German
- Based on: Lauda Sion
- Melody: attributed to Michael Haydn
- Composed: 1657
- Published: 1687

"Deinem Heiland, deinem Lehrer" ("To your Saviour, your teacher") is a Catholic hymn. The German text was written by Franz Xaver Riedel in 1773, a paraphrase of the Latin Lauda Sion. The 1781 melody has been attributed to Michael Haydn. The song has appeared in regional sections of the German hymnal Gotteslob, and is commonly used as a hymn sung during processions on the Feast of Corpus Christi.

== History ==
Franz Xaver Riedel, an Austrian Jesuit, wrote the text of "Deinem Heiland, deinem Lehrer" in 1773 as a paraphrase of the Latin Lauda Sion, a sequence for the Feast of Corpus Christi by Thomas Aquinas in 12 stanzas. The melody is from Salzburg, sometimes attributed to Michael Haydn. The song is still used as a processional hymn for the feast. It has appeared in regional sections of the German hymnal Gotteslob, such as in the Diocese of Cologne as GL 844, and in the Diocese of Limburg as GL 866, in four stanzas, with the third stanza edited by Maria Luise Thurmair It is also part of other collections.
