= Panis angelicus =

Penultimate stanza of Thomas Aquinas' Sacric solemniis

Panis angelicus (Latin for "Bread of Angels" or "Angelic Bread") is the penultimate stanza of the hymn "Sacris solemniis" written by Saint Thomas Aquinas for the feast of Corpus Christi as part of a complete liturgy of the feast, including prayers for the Mass and the Liturgy of the Hours.

The strophe of "Sacris solemniis" that begins with the words Panis angelicus ("bread of angels") has often been set to music separately from the rest of the hymn. Most famously, in 1872 César Franck set this strophe for tenor voice, harp, cello, and organ, and incorporated it into his Messe à trois voix.

Other hymns for Corpus Christi by Saint Thomas where sections have been separately set to music are "Verbum supernum prodiens" (the last two strophes begin with "O salutaris hostia") and "Pange lingua gloriosi" (the last two strophes begin with "Tantum ergo").

== Musical settings ==
The text was set as a motet by several Renaissance composers including João Lourenço Rebelo. In the seventeenth century, Marc-Antoine Charpentier set H.243 in 1670–75. Later romantic era settings include those by André Caplet, Saint-Saëns, and, best known of all, the setting by César Franck.

== Text ==
Panis angelicus
fit panis hominum;
Dat panis cœlicus
figuris terminum:
O res mirabilis!
Manducat Dominum
pauper, servus et humilis.

Te trina Deitas
unaque poscimus:
Sic nos tu visita,
sicut te colimus;
Per tuas semitas
duc nos quo tendimus,
Ad lucem quam inhabitas.
Amen.

Thus Angels' Bread is made
the Bread of man today:
the Living Bread from heaven
with figures dost away:
O wondrous gift indeed!
the poor and lowly may
upon their Lord and Master feed.

Thee, therefore, we implore,
O Godhead, One in Three,
so may Thou visit us
as we now worship Thee;
and lead us on Thy way,
That we at last may see
the light wherein Thou dwellest aye.
Amen.
