= Baby jumping =

Spanish festival

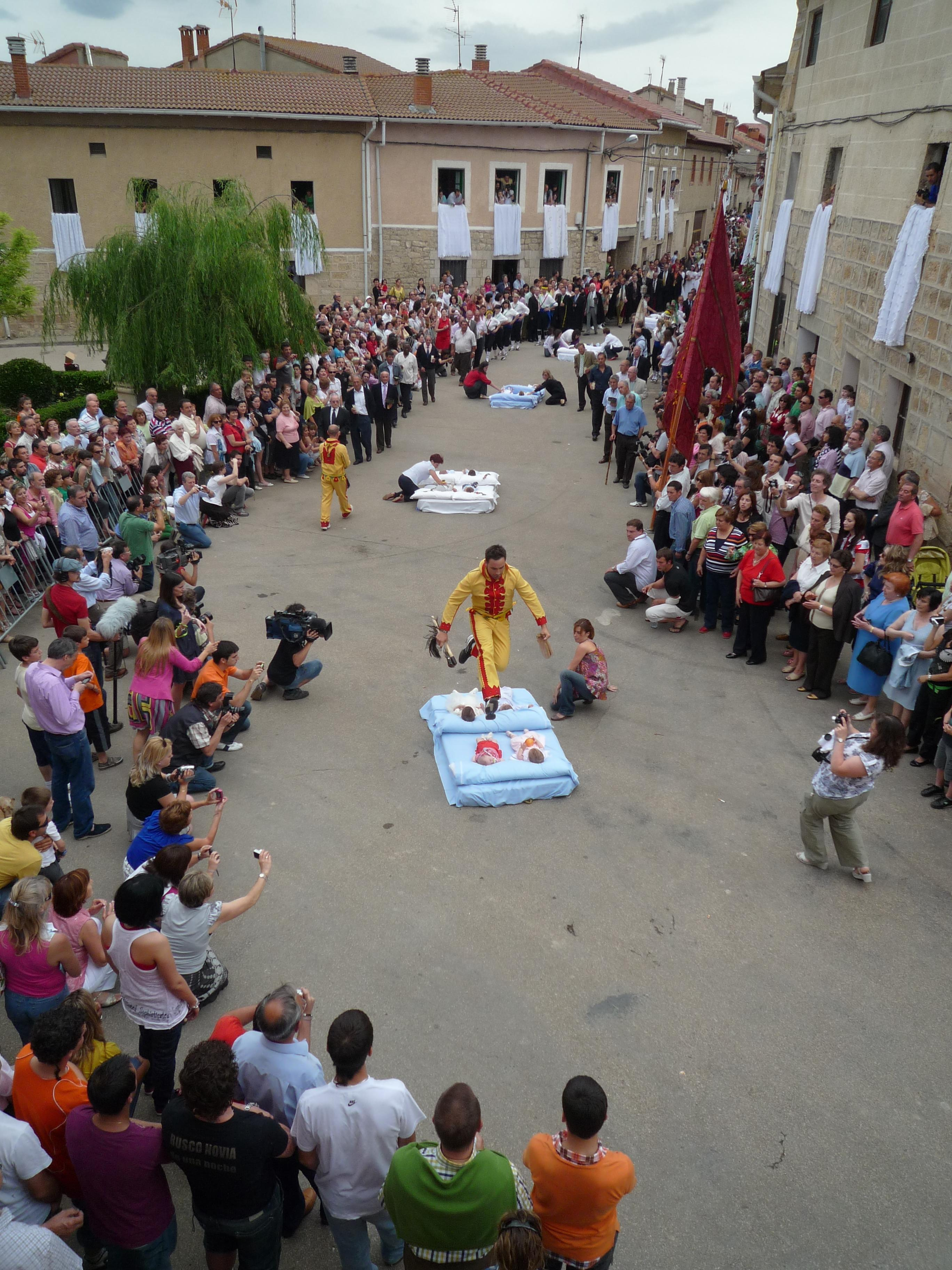

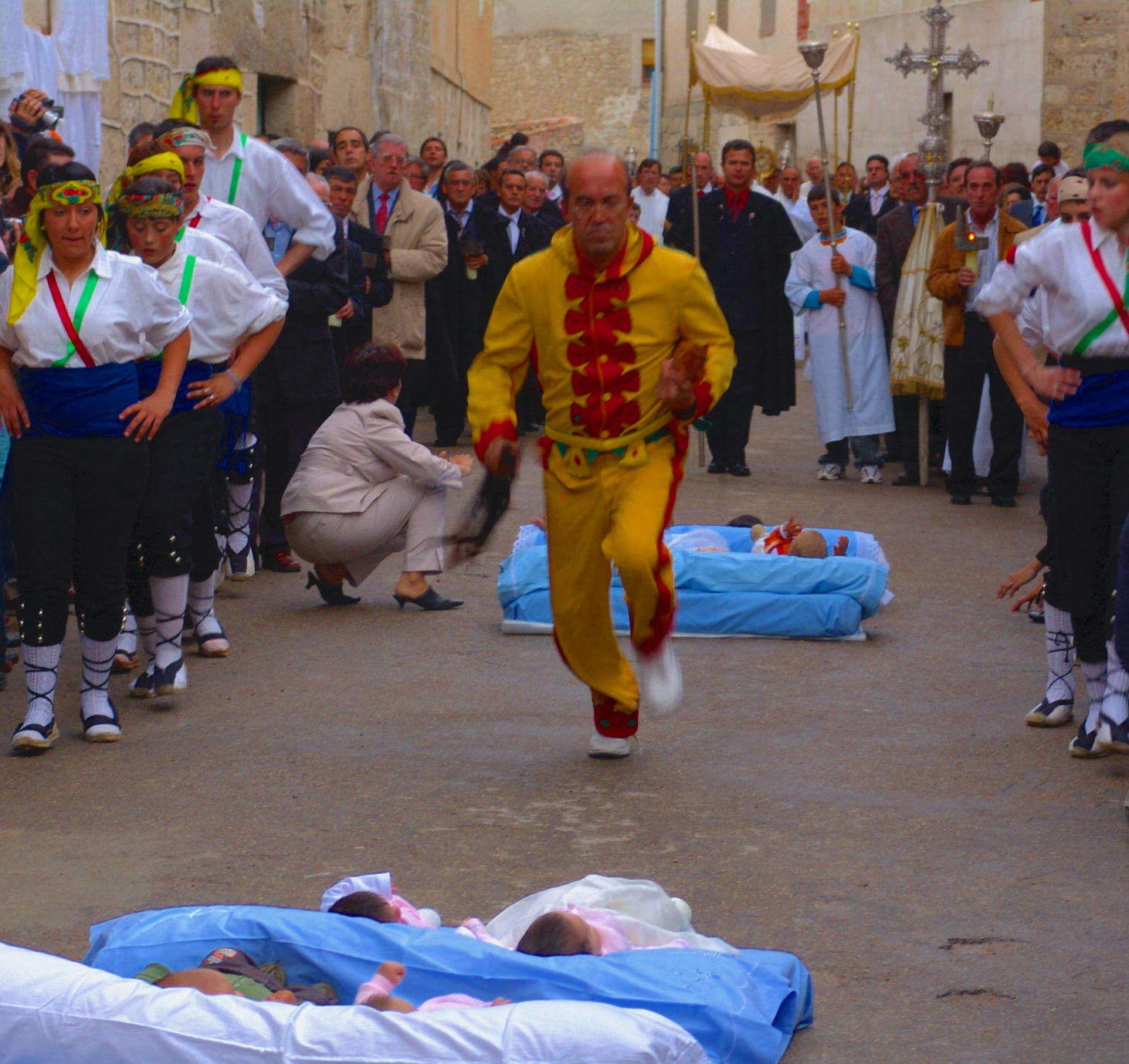

Baby jumping (Spanish: El Colacho) is a traditional Spanish festival dating back to 1620. It takes place annually to celebrate the Catholic feast of Corpus Christi in Castrillo de Murcia, a village in the municipality of Sasamón in the province of Burgos.

== Description ==
During the act, known as El Salto del Colacho (the devil jump) or simply El Colacho, men dressed as the Devil (known as the Colacho) in red and yellow suits jump over babies born during the previous twelve months who lie on mattresses in the street. The "devils" hold whips and oversized castanets as they jump over the infant children. Before the jump begins, the devils taunt onlookers until "atabalero" drummers arrive. These pious men signal the beginning of the jump, which represents the devils being driven out and on their way. They jump over the babies, absorbing their sins, taking such sins with them.

The Brotherhood of the Blessed Sacrament of Minerva organizes the week-long festivities, which culminate on Sunday when the Colacho jumps over the babies on the mattresses placed on the procession route traversing the town.

The tradition's origins are unknown, but it is said to eliminate the babies original sin, ensuring them safe passage through life and guarding against illness and evil spirits. Pope Benedict XVI asked Spanish priests to distance themselves from El Colacho, as the Church teaches that the original sin is cleansed by baptism.

== Colacho in Costa Rica ==
As an unrelated Christmas tradition, El Colacho (short for Nicolacho or Saint Nicholas) is Costa Rican's version of Santa Claus.

== See also ==
- Capirote
- Running of the Bulls
- La Tomatina
