= Robert of Thourotte =

Roman Catholic bishop (died 1246)

Robert of Thourotte (died 1246) was Bishop of Langres 1232–1240, and Bishop of Liège 1240–1246.

He instituted the feast of Corpus Christi, which he ordered to be celebrated first in 1246. This was at the suggestion conveyed through his archdeacon Jacques Pantaléon of Juliana of Liège, whom he had supported in her conflict with the convent authorities.
