= Franz Xaver Riedel =

German hymn writer (1738–1773)

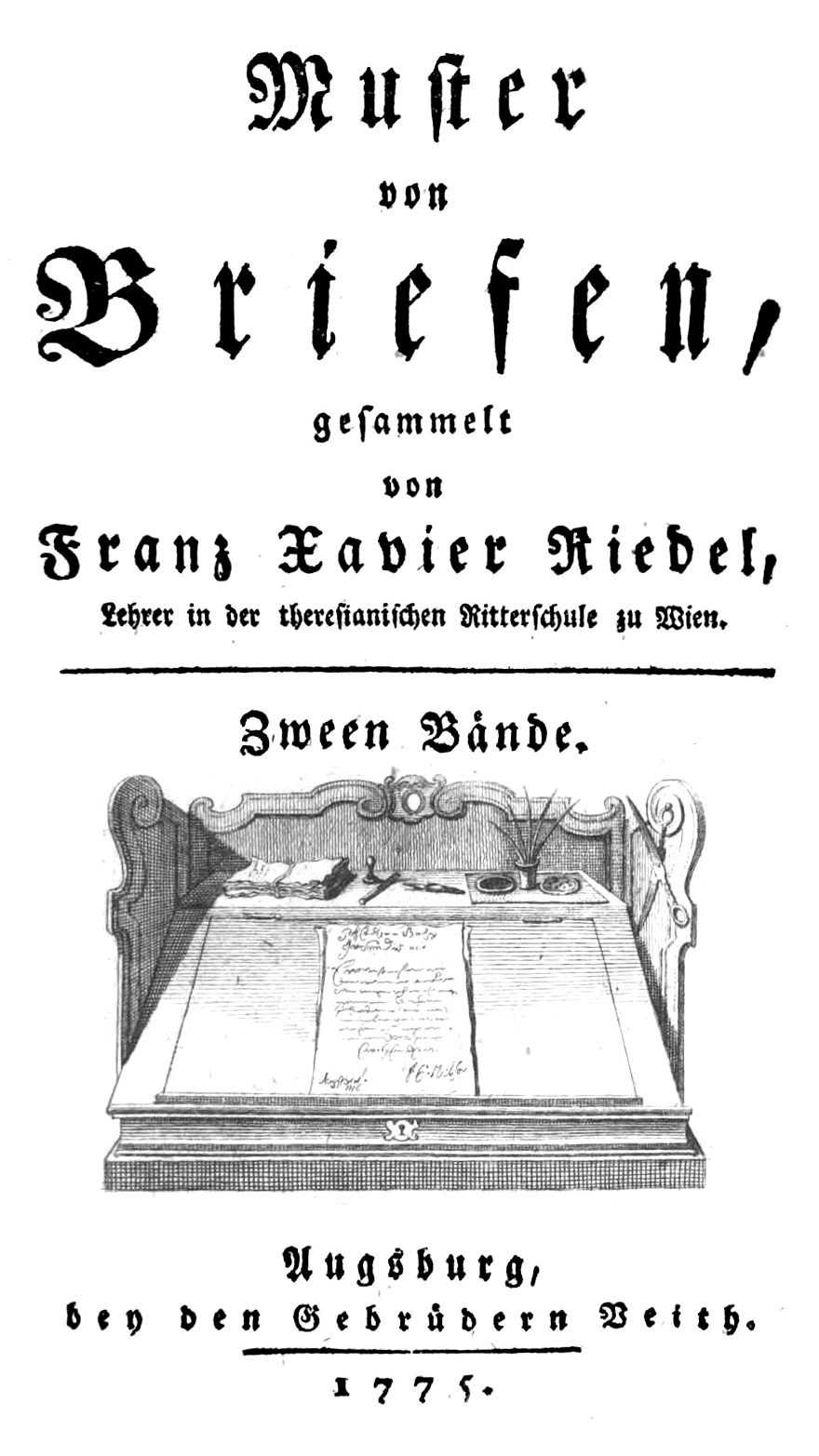
- Riedel: Muster von Briefen, title page
- Born: 15 October 1738; Mautern an der Donau, Lower Austria, Austria-Hungary
- Died: 30 October 1773 (aged 35); Güns, Austria-Hungary
- Occupations: Priest; Pedagogue; Author; Hymn writer

Franz Xaver Riedel SJ (15 October 1738 – 30 October 1773) was an Austrian Jesuit Priest, pedagogue, author and hymn writer.

== Life ==
Riedel was born in Mautern an der Donau on 15 October 1738. He joined the Jesuits as a novice at age 16 and received a broad humanistic education. After his profession, he worked as a teacher of ancient languages and literature, poetry and architecture at Jesuit Gymnasien, first in Graz and Linz and ultimately at the Theresianum in Vienna. With abolition of the Jesuits in 1773, he moved to Güns (now in Hungary).

He died in Güns on 30 October 1773.

== Work ==
Riedel was a friend of the Jesuit scholar Michael Denis. His poetry is influenced by Friedrich Gottlieb Klopstock. Riedel authored poetic paraphrases of Latin hymns from Roman tradition, published as Lieder der Kirche aus den römischen Tagzeiten und dem Meßbuche übersetzt in 1773. Among them is the hymn "Deinem Heiland, deinem Lehrer", a paraphrase of "Lauda Sion", which is contained in many regional sections of the 2013 Catholic hymnal Gotteslob. It is frequently sung for Corpus Christi processions.

=== Publications ===
Most of Riedel's works were published after his death, including.

- Die Klagelieder Jeremiä verteutscht (Lamentations in German, Vienna 1761
- Metrische Uebersetzung aller biblischen Lieder (Metric translation of all Biblical canticles), Vienna 1771
- Lieder der Kirche aus den römischen Tagzeiten und dem Meßbuche übersetzt (Hymns of the Church from the Roman books of hours and missals), Vienna and Augsburg 1773
- Deutsche Sammlung von Briefmustern für die Jugend (German collection of letter examples for the youth), Vienna 1775, later editions in Augsburg under Muster von Briefen (Examples of letters)
- Das Buch Job in zwölf Gesängen (The Book of Job in twelve songs), Pressburg 1779
- Anfangsgründe der Kriegsbaukunst (Introduction to military architecture), Vienna 1777, and Anfangsgründe der bürgerlichen Baukunst (Introduction to civilian architecture), Vienna 1786, translations of Latin writings by Johann Baptist Izzo SJ
