= Regimen Animarum =

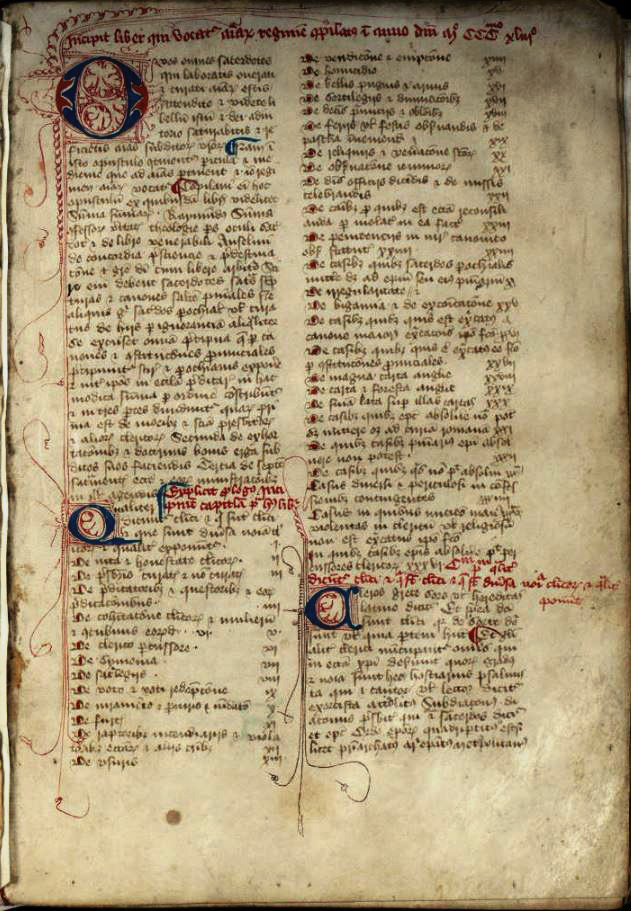
Page 11 Regimen Animarum

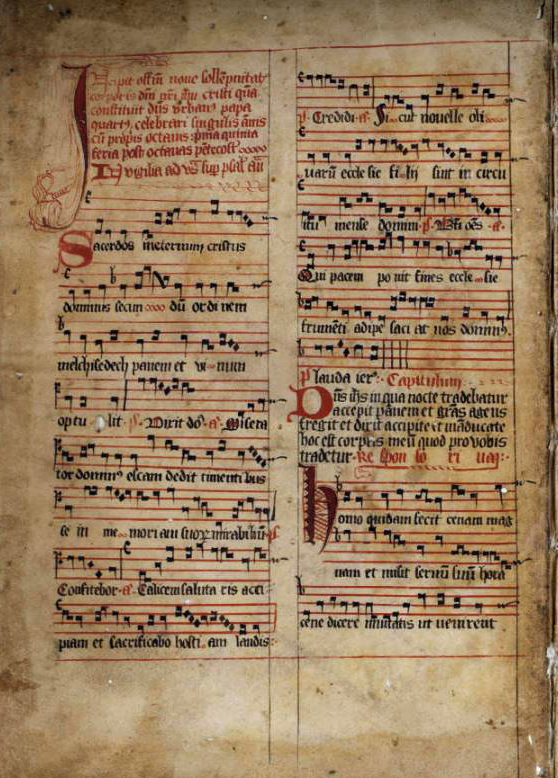
Regimen Animarum sheet music

Regimen Animarum is a Latin codex that was written in 1343 for the Archbishop of Canterbury. It contains the Office of the Feast of Corpus Christi.

== History ==
Regimen Animarum is a Latin book that was written in 1343 by a Frenchman called "Beche." It was written for the Archbishop of Canterbury. It contains the Office of the Feast of Corpus Christi and talks about its history. It also contains teachings and sacraments used in the Catholic Church. It was intended to be a summary of the Catholic beliefs and an English clerical manual.

The Regimen Animarum is not original content, but is the work of various Latin manuals combined. "Beche," therefore, is most likely the compiler of the books and not the scribe that wrote them. Of the three books that are found in the Regimen Animarum, his name appears in two of them.

The Regimen Animarum includes many of the offences and abuses that occurred in the church at this time. The book makes mention of rising resistance to the Pope. The book, therefore, anticipated the Protestant Reformation that would come later.

The book remained with private owners until recently. The Regimen Animarum is currently in the L. Tom Perry Special Collections at Brigham Young University.

== Format and composition ==
The original book has 211 leaves and has pages made of parchment. It has nineteen gatherings of pages. Before the text of Regimen Animarum begins, there are four leaves which contain the New Office of the Corpus Christi. Each page is written with two columns and between 48 and 50 lines each. It also contains various pages of sheet music. All headings in the book are red, and initials are in blue. The codex binding is made of goatskin.

The book is a compilation of three books. The first section of the book talks about the state of the soul. It discusses dangers to the soul as well as the importance of reverence and spiritual rituals. The second part of the book is about teaching and exhortations of the Catholic Church. The third part talks about the sacraments.
