= Juliana of Liège =

Mystic and saint

Saint Juliana of Liège O.Praem.
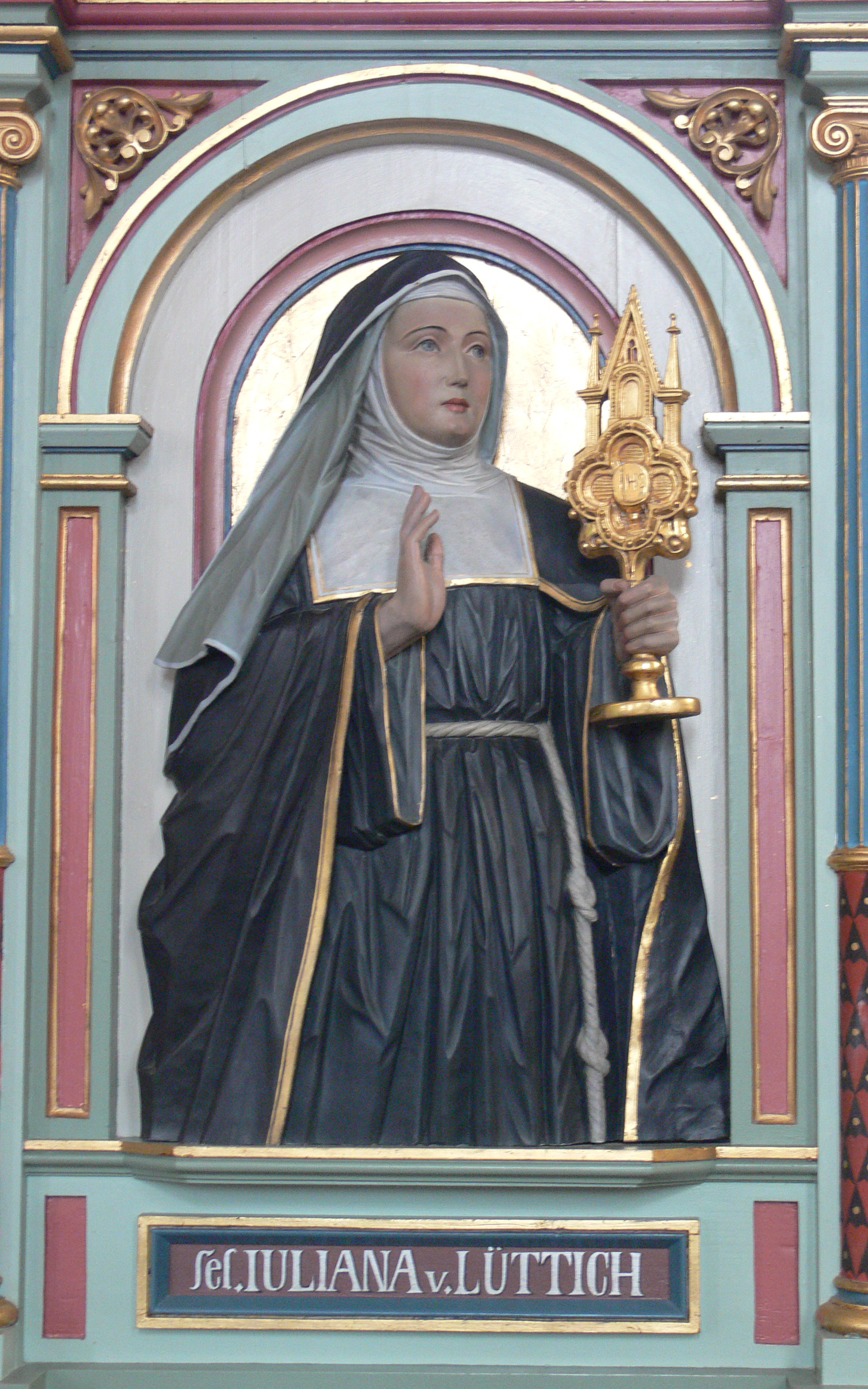

Apostle of the Blessed Sacrament
- Born: c. 1192–1193; Retinnes, Prince-Bishopric of Liège, Holy Roman Empire
- Died: 5 April 1258; Fosses-la-Ville, County of Namur, Holy Roman Empire
- Venerated in: Roman Catholic Church (Premonstratensian Order) (Roman Catholic Diocese of Liège)
- Canonized: 1869 by Pope Pius IX
- Major shrine: The former Villers Abbey; Villers-la-Ville, Walloon Brabant, Belgium
- Feast: 6 April
- Attributes: holding a monstrance
- Patronage: Devotion to the Blessed Sacrament

Juliana of Liège (also called Juliana of Mount-Cornillon), (c. 1192 or 1193 – 5 April 1258) was a medieval Norbertine canoness regular and mystic in what is now Belgium. Traditional scholarly sources have long recognized her as the promoter of the Feast of Corpus Christi, first celebrated in Liège in 1246, and later adopted for the Catholic Church in 1264. More recent scholarship includes manuscript analysis of the initial version of the Office, as found in The Hague, National Library of the Netherlands (KB 70.E.4) and a close reading of her Latin vita, a critical edition of which was published in French by the Belgian scholar and current (2023) bishop of Liège, Jean-Pierre Delville.

Newer scholarly work notes the many references to her musical and liturgical performances. Modern women scholars recognize Juliana as the "author" of the initial version of the Latin Office, Animarum cibus, which takes its title from the beginning of its first antiphon.

== Biography ==
Juliana and her twin sister Agnes were born in the village of Retinnes in the Prince-Bishopric of Liège. They were orphaned at age five and placed in a newly founded hospice at Mont-Cornillon, right outside of Liège. The canonry seems to have been established on the model of a double monastery, with both canons and canonesses, each living in their own wing of the monastery. The two girls were initially placed on a small farm next to the canonry. Juliana, after entering the Order at the age of 13, worked for many years in its leprosarium. Agnes seems to have died young, as there is no further mention of her in the archives.

From her early youth, Juliana had great veneration for the Eucharist (as did many of the women of Liège) and longed for a special feast day in its honor. When Juliana was 16 she had her first vision which recurred subsequently several times. Her vision presented the moon in its full splendour, crossed diametrically by a dark stripe. In time she came to understand that the moon symbolized the life of the church on earth, the opaque line, on the other hand, represented the absence of a liturgical feast in honor of Christ's Body and Blood. Not having any way to bring about such a feast, she kept her thoughts to herself, except for sharing them with an anchoress, Eve of Liège, who lived in a cell adjacent to the Basilica of St. Martin, and a few other trusted sisters in her monastery. Her vision is illustrated on the historiated initial letter of her vita as it appears in Paris, Bibliothèque de l'Arsenal (MS 945, fol. 2).

Around 1225, she was elected prioress of the double canonry and told her visions to her confessor, Canon John of Lausanne (a secular canon of the collegiate chapter at Saint Martin Basilica). Canon John had many contacts among the distinguished French theologians and Dominican professors who had gathered in Liège. These included Robert de Thorete, the Bishop of Liège, Hugh of Saint-Cher, the Dominican Prior Provincial for France, and Jacques Pantaleon of Troyes, Archdeacon of Liège, who later became bishop of the Diocese of Verdun, then Latin Patriarch of Jerusalem, and finally pope, ruling under the name Pope Urban IV. Canon John reportedly relayed Juliana's vision to these distinguished religious leaders. These theologians agreed unanimously that there was nothing in the devotion of the feast contrary to the Catholic faith and endorsed instituting it.

Upon receiving approbation from local religious authorities, Juliana set to work with Canon John, who was still a young man, and together they composed the initial version of the office, Animarum cibus. This early office can be found in the composite manuscript, The Hague, National Library of the Netherlands (KB 70.E.4). In 1246, Bishop Robert instituted the first feast of Christ's Body and Blood for his own diocese. He died later that same year, however, and never saw it completed, though the feast was celebrated by the canons of St. Martin.

Juliana's life was filled with tumult, largely as a consequence of the religious and political controversies rampant in Liège: an emerging urban middle class demanding new rights, political rivalries between the Guelphs and the Ghibellines, and internecine quarrels among the lower nobility in Flanders. These conflicts created a context ripe for this type of movement. When Juliana became prioress of the canonry, she re-instated strict Augustinian rules. In 1240, the canonry and adjacent leprosarium came under the supervision of a man named Roger. He immediately disliked both Juliana and her reproaches, and incited the citizenry against her, accusing her of diverting and stealing the hospital's funds. She fled to the anchorhold of her friend, Dame Eve, and was then received into Canon John's house, adjacent to the basilica. With the help of Robert of Thourotte, the Bishop of Liège, Juliana was vindicated and restored to her former position in the canonry. Roger was deposed. In 1247, however, upon the death of Bishop Robert, Roger once again regained control of Mont Cornillon under the new bishop, Henry de Gueldre, and Juliana was again driven out. These events in Juliana's biography, to a certain extent, point to the larger historical backdrop of rivalry over the vacated bishopric, amplified by the excommunication of Frederick II by Pope Innocent IV.

Thereafter Juliana found refuge in the Cistercian monasteries at Robermont, Val-Benoit, and Val-Notre-Dame, and then among the poor Beguines. Aided by Abbess Imene, who was the sister of Archbishop Conrad of Cologne, Juliana took up residence at the Cistercian Abbey of Salzinnes, and finally Fosses-la-Ville, in the County of Namur, where she lived in seclusion until her death. On her deathbed she asked for her confessor, John of Lausanne, supposedly to reveal to him long hidden secrets. But neither he nor any of her friends from Liege arrived. Upon her death, based on her wishes, her friend, the Cistercian monk Gobert d'Aspremont, moved her body to Villers Abbey. On the following Sunday her remains were moved to the section of the cemetery reserved for saints. Although her cult developed immediately, it did not receive official recognition until 1869 under Pope Pius IX.

== Veneration ==
In 1261, the Archdeacon Pantaleon was elected Pope, and took the name Pope Urban IV. In 1264, Urban IV instituted the Solemnity of Corpus Christi on the Thursday after Pentecost as a feast for the entire Latin Church, by the papal bull Transiturus de hoc mundo. He commissioned his chief theologian, Thomas Aquinas, to compose an office for the Feast of Corpus Christi. Thomas composed two versions, with considerable textual overlap: Sapiencia edificavit (no Latin misspelling here) and then Sacerdos in eternum. The inter-textual study of these Offices has been the topic of considerable research, with most scholars concluding that they represent "draft" and final versions of the work of Thomas. Pope Urban recorded the initial celebration in letters to the various clergy, but also sent a copy to Juliana's friend, Dame the recluse Eve of Saint Martin at St. Martin Basilica. She is thought by contemporary scholars to have composed the initial version of Juliana's vita in French and thus stands, alongside Juliana, as among the first women authors of medieval Europe.

The first formal theological statement of the doctrine of transubstantiation can be found in the homily by Thomas in the Sacerdos in eternum version as found in BNF 1143 (a musical manuscript devoted entirely to the office). Scholars have also noted the movement from doctrinal to biblical versions in the Office texts. And, stylistically, Juliana's version sets known texts to new music; the Aquinas version rearranges biblical quotations to known chants, thus creating contrafacta. In 1264 Pope Urban IV issued the papal bull Transiturus in which the Feast of Corpus Christi, i.e., the feast of the Body of Christ was declared a feast throughout the entire Latin Rite. This was the very first papally sanctioned universal feast in the history of the Latin Rite. The feast is traditionally celebrated on the Thursday after Trinity Sunday, but in the liturgical reforms of 1969, under Pope Paul VI, the bishops of every nation have the option to transfer it to the following Sunday.

Juliana was canonized in 1869 by Pope Pius IX and further celebrated by Pope John Paul II, who wrote a letter mentioning her on the 750th anniversary of the Feast of Corpus Christi. Her feast day is the 6 April.

== See also ==
- Christian mysticism
- Guelphs and Ghibellines
