= Infiorate di Spello =

Artistic manifestation related to the Christian solemnity of Corpus Christi

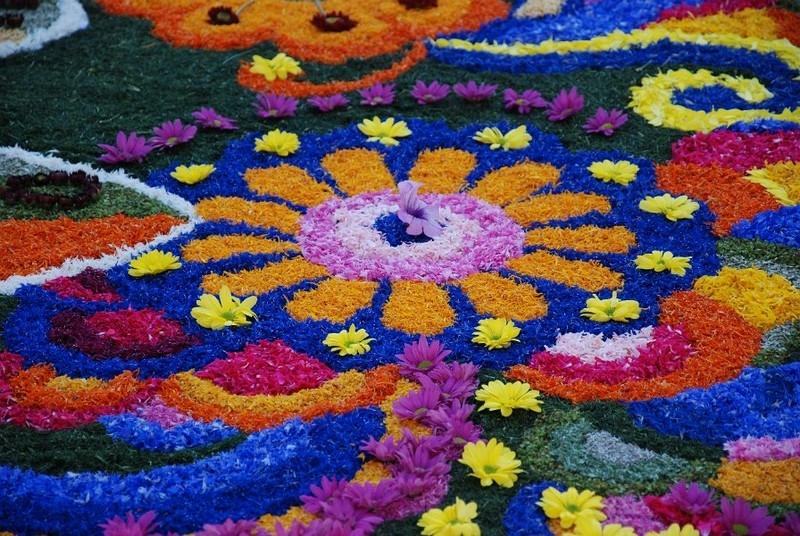
Spello's Infiorate (detail)

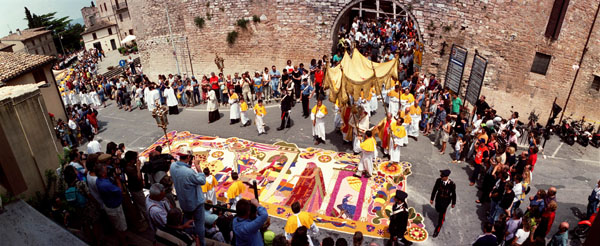
Procession of Corpus Christi on the flower carpets

Infiorate di Spello is a custom which is practiced every year in the Umbrian town of Spello (Italy) on the Feast of Corpus Christi. On that night, almost a thousand people work incessantly to create carpets and pictures made of flowers along the town's narrow streets. Floral creations cover streets throughout the historical centre in preparation for the passage of the Blessed Sacrament carried in procession by the bishop on Sunday morning. The result is a one-mile-long path of floral creations.

== History ==
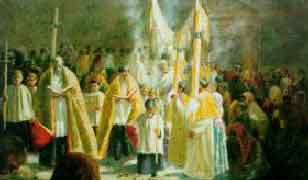
Benvenuto Crispoldi: Procession (c. 1915), oil painting

In Spello this tradition, which has gone from first throwing flowers, then to placing them in art forms on the pavement, is documented in the Municipal archives for the first time in 1831. On the occasion of the visit of bishop Ignazio Cadolini on October 19, 1831, the gonfaloniere Francesco Nicoletti asked all citizens with houses facing the main street to "keep clean and free from all rubbish their respective areas around each house and spread flowers and greenery" in occasion of the procession. The iconographic testimonials about the Infiorate in Spello date back to the beginning of the 19th century: Benvenuto Crispoldi (1886–1923), painter and mayor of Spello, depicted the procession of the Feast of Corpus Christi on the flower carpets in one of his paintings.

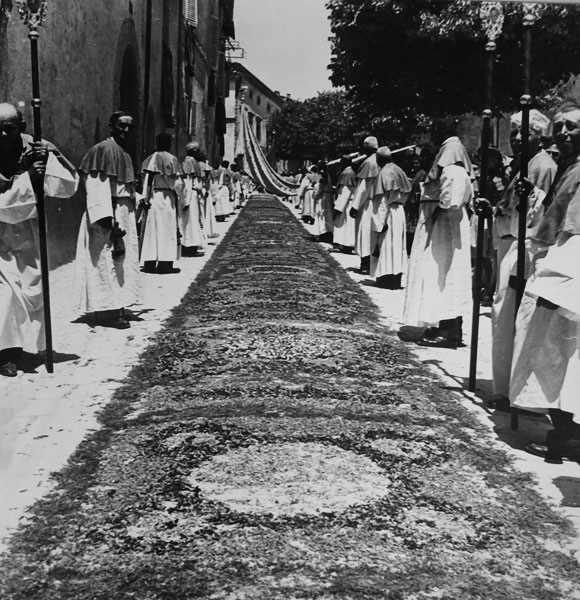
Infiorate (vintage photo)

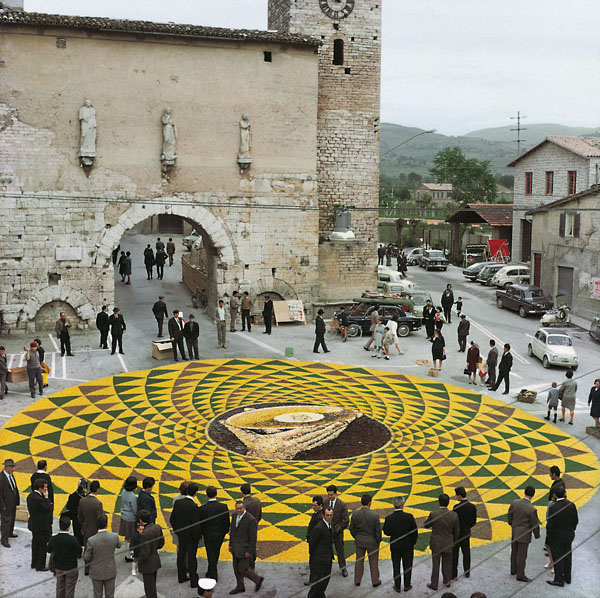
Infiorate in the '70s

As techniques evolved over time, what was once a long uninterrupted carpet of flowers, characterized by a relatively simple design, morphed into separate, more sophisticated sets of bigger compositions. Distinct groups of creators emerged, focusing on improving artistic execution and addressing more complex religious and social messages. Starting from the mid-60s, Infiorate's design, until then characterized by geometrical schemes and central figures with symbols almost exclusively connected to the Corpus Domini, evolved constantly, reaching by the end of the 80s a style dominated by the presence of a central composition.

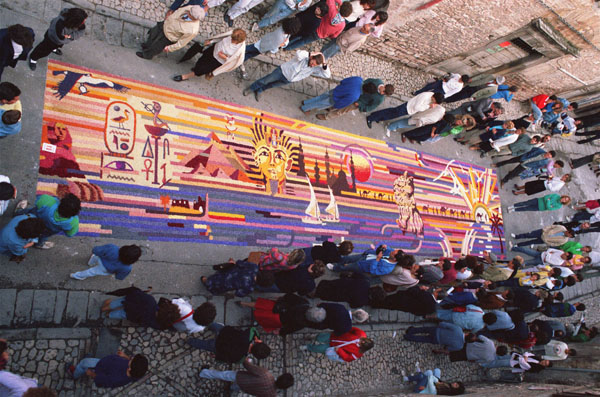
Infiorate: The escape from Egypt (1987)

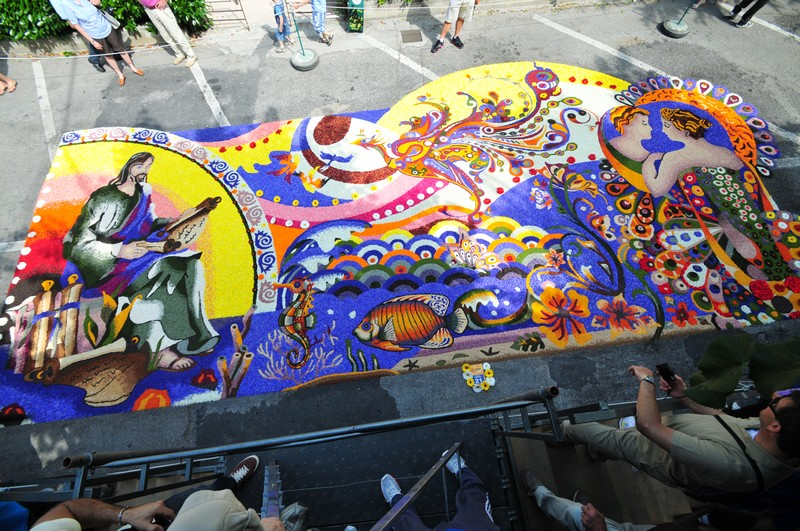
Infiorate (2012)

The flower carpets, in its own a form of true painting with flower petals, have reached over time high levels of technical sophistication which, coupled with the expression and interpretation of increasingly complex and often abstract socio-religious themes, forced the Infiorate's artists to dedicate more time to the concept and design stage as well as to the in depth study of philosophical and historical themes.

In the 60s the creation of a contest to recognize the best Infiorate has stimulated the competition among the groups of artists and has led to an accelerated development and improvement in the quality of the compositions. The first informal competitions were organized by the prelates of the two main Spello's parishes: S. Maria Maggiore and S. Lorenzo Martire. The prize consists in the right to hold for a year onto a bronze statue of Sesto Properzio (c. 47 – 14 B.C.), the Latin poet whose birthplace is contended between Spello and Assisi. In recent years, the fame of Spello's Infiorate has reached out of the regional and national borders. Their creators are called to compose flower carpets for special occasions or to honour institutional persons such as Pope John Paul II and Italian Republic Presidents Sandro Pertini and Oscar Luigi Scalfaro. They have also had the honour of taking their art to places such as Lourdes and Bethlehem.

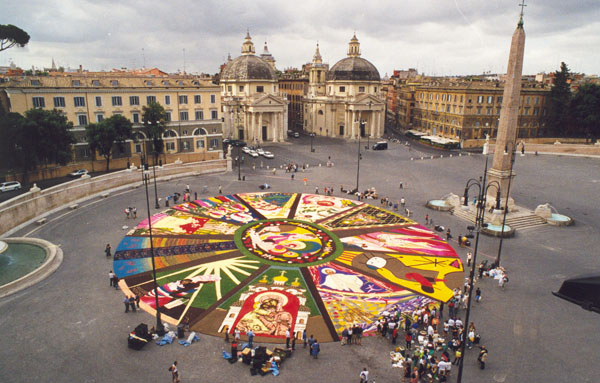
Infiorate at Piazza del Popolo, Rome for the Jubilee (2000)

Since 2002 infiorate's artists have been organized independently as the association Le Infiorate di Spello (https://www.infioratespello.it) with the purpose of promoting the manifestation, maintaining and enhancing the quality of the compositions and preserving the continuity of this tradition. Over the course of the last 10 years the association expanded to almost 1000 members, in representation of more than 40 groups of artists.

== Techniques ==
Differently from other similar manifestations, Spello's Infiorate creators compose their splendid carpets using flowers collected in the wild. While the use of other parts of the plants, like leaves and berries is allowed, the preference is given to the use of petals only, either fresh or dried. The use of wood and any kind of synthetic material is severely prohibited.

Exsiccation of the flowers must be carried out naturally in the sun. Dried petals are sometime gently chopped to improve their deployment in high resolution details and fine design elements. However, they cannot be turned into a powder as the floral nature and appearance of the material have to be always preserved. The gathering, meticulous collection and processing of these natural materials starts several months before their actual use, becoming often a year around effort in order to tap into the variety of seasonal floral species.

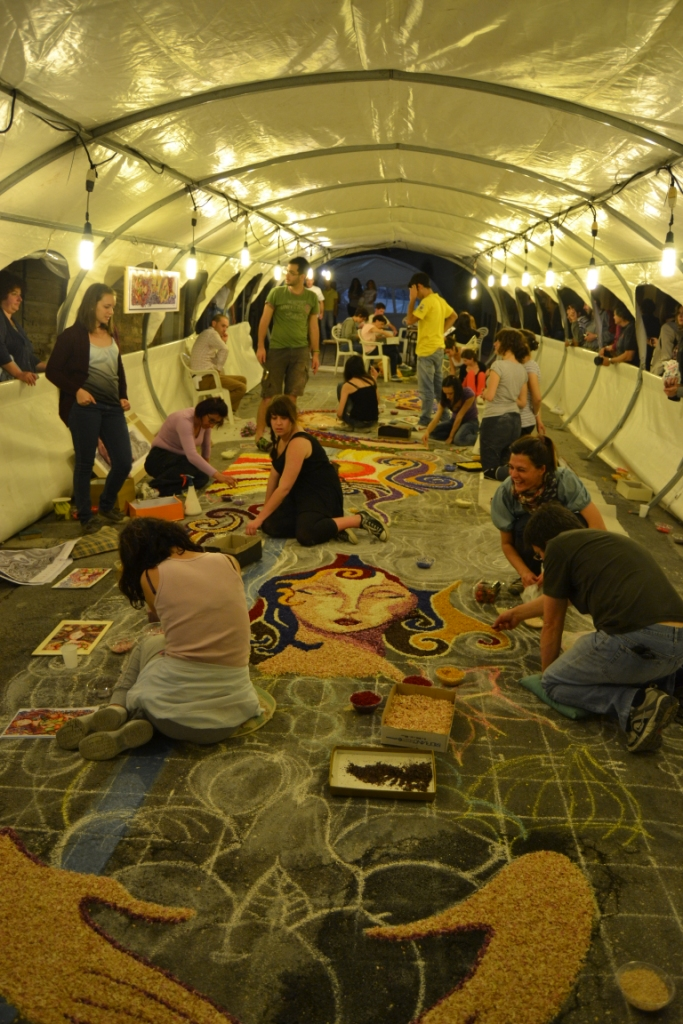
Spello's infioratori at work

Drawings are either traced on the streets using chalk and the technique of division into squares, or drawn onto paper and then stuck to the ground, thus allowing bigger and more complex designs. The representations, always inspired by religious themes, often contain intricate three-dimensional effects, usually obtained with the use of prospective, shading and layering of the flowers, without the use of any glue. Each Infiorate must have either a minimum length of 12 metres, or cover a surface of at least 24 square metres, depending on the nature of the composition: Quadro (single scene picture) vs Tappeto (floral carpet with repetitive geometrical patterns).

== Infiorate realized for special events in Spello and around the world ==
- 1985 - Spello (Italy): visit by the Italian Republic President, Sandro Pertini
- 1986 - Perugia (Italy): visit by Pope John Paul II
- 1993 - Foligno (Italy): visit by Pope John Paul II
- 1993 - Assisi (Italy): consignment of the oil for the votive lamp in occasion of Saint Francis feast
- 1994 - Spello (Italy): visit by the Italian Republic President, Oscar Luigi Scalfaro
- 2000 - Rome (Italy): petal flower carpet at Piazza del Popolo for the Jubilee
- 2000 - Bethlehem (Palestine): petal flower carpet in the square of the Crib for “Italia per Betlemme”
- 2002 - Clès (Italy): petal flower carpet
- 2002 - Fabriano (Italy): petal flower carpet competition for Italian flower carpet creators (Spello won the 1st prize)
- 2003 - Brussels (Belgium): petal flower carpet in occasion of the six month Italian presidency at the E.U.
- 2006 - Padua (Italy): National manifestation of C.I.A (confederation of Italian agriculture)
- 2008 - Lourdes (France): 334 square meter petal flower carpet, realized together with other Italian creators for the 150th anniversary of the apparition of the Madonna
- 2012 - Venice (Italy): III International Conference on Negative Growth
- 2013 - Spello (Italy): participation of Spello to the European competition "Entente Florale Europe" (June 24, 2013)
- 2013 - Assisi (Italy): visit of Pope Francis (October 4, 2013)
- 2014 - Rome (Italy): petal flower carpet in Pio XII Square on the occasion of the 5th International Congress of Ephemeral Arts (June 29, 2014)
- 2015 – Spello (Italy): petal flower carpet in Santa Maria Maggiore Church in the honour of the Archbishop of Spello, Piergiorgio Bertoldi (July 5, 2015)
- 2015 – Milan (Italy): petal flower carpet on Cardo Street at Expo2015, with support of "I Borghi più Belli d'Italia" and Regione Umbria (October 20, 2015)
- 2016 – Assisi (Italy): visit by Pope Francis to the Porziuncola of S. Maria degli Angeli (August 4, 2016)
- 2017 – Spello (Italy): visit by the Italian Republic President, Sergio Mattarella (May 19, 2017)
- 2018 – Spello (Italy): Grand opening of Spello's Villa of Mosaics (March 24, 2018)
- 2018 – Assisi (Italy): St. Francis (Protector of Italy) feast, in collaboration with the Associazione Nazionale Città dell’Infiorata (October 4, 2018)
