= Sacris solemniis =

Eucharistic hymn by Thomas Aquinas

"Sacris solemniis" is a hymn written by St. Thomas Aquinas (1225–1274) for the feast of Corpus Christi (also known as the Solemnity of the Holy Body and Blood of Christ). The strophe of Sacris solemniis that begins with the words "Panis angelicus" (bread of angels) has often been set to music separately from the rest of the hymn. It appears about 1768 in the iberian musical form Vilancete/Villancico at Francesc Morera's "Si el grano divino". Most famously, in 1872 César Franck set this strophe for voice (tenor), harp, cello, and organ, and incorporated it into his Messe à trois voix Opus 12. The hymn expresses the doctrine that the bread and wine are changed into the Body and Blood of Christ. In the Roman Catholic tradition the concept of transubstantiation is presented as an explanation of how this change happens.

The phenomenon whereby the strophe of Sacris solemniis that begins with the words "Panis angelicus" is often treated as a separate hymn has occurred also with other hymns that Thomas Aquinas wrote for Corpus Christi: Verbum supernum prodiens (the last two strophes beginning with "O salutaris hostia"), Adoro te devote (the strophe beginning with "Pie pelicane, Jesu Domine"), and Pange lingua gloriosi corporis mysterium (the last two strophes beginning with "Tantum ergo").

== Latin text and English version ==
The Latin text below is from the Liturgy of the Hours. The English translation is a cento based upon a translation by John David Chambers (1805–1893).

== In popular culture ==
In the 4th episode of the first season of the 2022 television show Night Sky, the character Jude sings the first verse of Sacris solemniis at a karaoke bar.

Michael and Lauren chant Sacris solemnis in the Small Prophets episode "The Birds of America" while burying the three homunculi's jars in manure.

== Text ==
Sacris solemniis fragment at Morera's villancico 'Si el grano divino'

Latin text	An English translation
Sacris solemniis iuncta sint gaudia, et ex præcordiis sonent præconia; recedant vetera, nova sint omnia, corda, voces et opera. Noctis recolitur cena novissima, qua Christus creditur agnum et azyma dedisse fratribus, iuxta legitima priscis indulta patribus. Post agnum typicum, expletis epulis, Corpus Dominicum datum discipulis, sic totum omnibus, quod totum singulis, eius fatemur manibus. Dedit fragilibus corporis ferculum, dedit et tristibus sanguinis poculum, dicens: Accipite quod trado vasculum; omnes ex eo bibite. Sic sacrificium istud instituit, cuius officium committi voluit solis presbyteris, quibus sic congruit, ut sumant, et dent ceteris. Panis angelicus fit panis hominum; dat panis cælicus figuris terminum; O res mirabilis ! Manducat Dominum pauper, servus et humilis. Te, trina Deitas unaque, poscimus, sic nos tu visita, sicut te colimus; per tuas semitas duc nos quo tendimus, ad lucem quam inhabitas.	At this our solemn feast let holy joys abound, and from the inmost breast let songs of praise resound; let ancient rites depart, and all be new around, in every act, and voice, and heart. Remember we that eve, when, the Last Supper spread, Christ, as we all believe, the Lamb, with leavenless bread, among His brethren shared, and thus the Law obeyed, of all unto their sire declared. The typic Lamb consumed, the legal Feast complete, the Lord unto the Twelve His Body gave to eat; the whole to all, no less the whole to each did mete with His own hands, as we confess. He gave them, weak and frail, His Flesh, their Food to be; on them, downcast and sad, His Blood bestowed He: and thus to them He spake: "Receive this Cup from Me, and all of you of this partake." So He this Sacrifice to institute did will, and charged His priests alone that office to fulfill: to them He did confide:to whom it pertains still to take, and the rest divide. Thus Angels' Bread is made the Bread of man today: the Living Bread from heaven with figures dost away: O miraculous gift indeed! the poor and lowly may upon their Lord and Master feed. Thee, therefore, we implore, O Godhead, One in Three, so may Thou visit us as we now worship Thee; and lead us on Thy way, That we at last may see the light wherein Thou dwellest aye.

== See also ==
- Gloria in excelsis Deo
- Adoro te devote
- Veni Sancte Spiritus
- Lauda Sion
- Pange lingua gloriosi corporis mysterium
- Verbum supernum prodiens
