= Lauda Sion =

Catholic hymn about the Eucharist for Corpus Christi

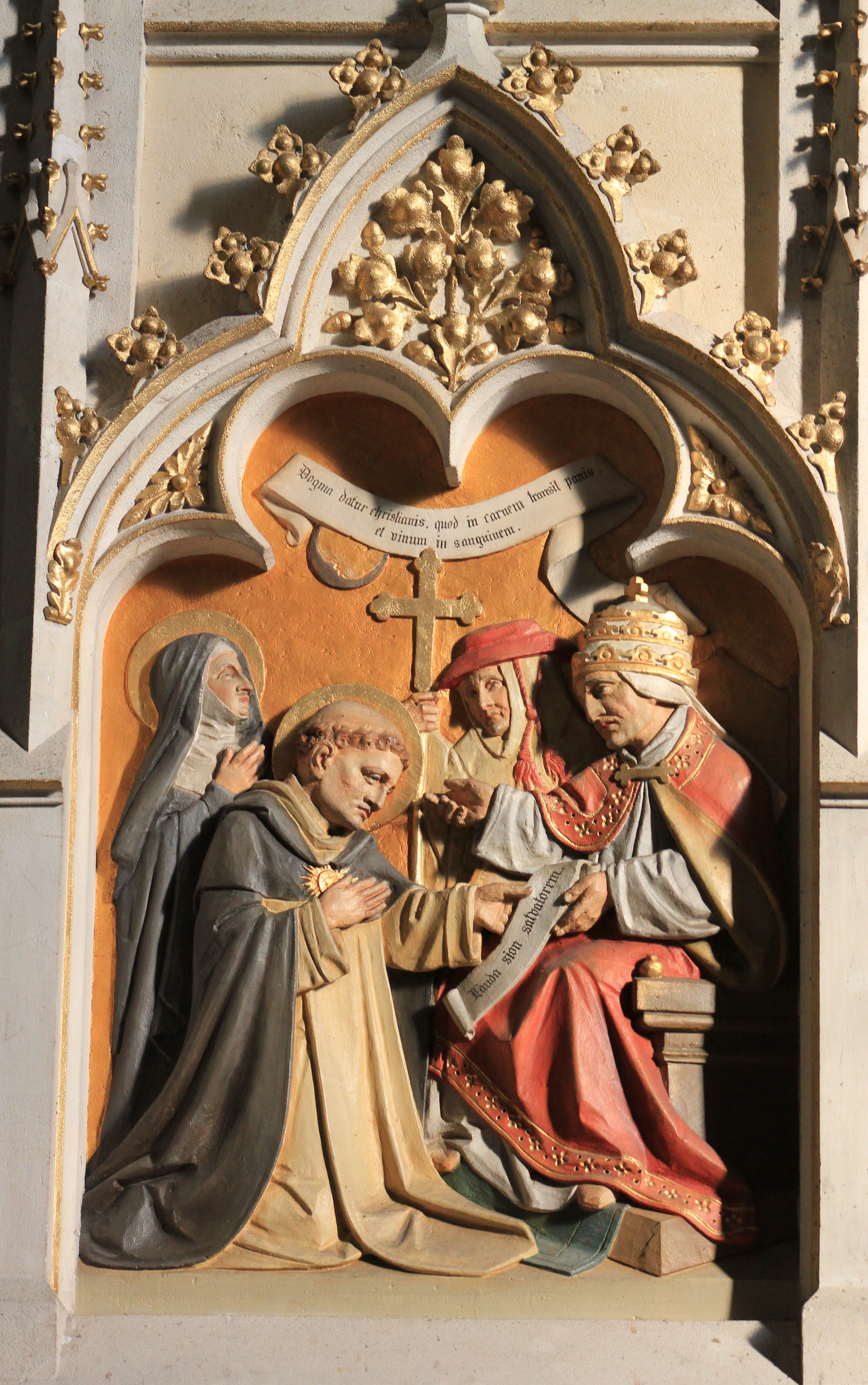
Aquinas presenting Lauda Sion to the Pope

"Lauda Sion" is a sequence for the Roman Rite Mass on the Feast of Corpus Christi. It was written by St. Thomas Aquinas around 1264, at the request of Pope Urban IV for the new Mass of this feast, along with Pange lingua, Sacris solemniis, and Verbum supernum prodiens, which are used in the Divine Office.

== Overview ==
The Gregorian melody of the Lauda Sion is borrowed from the eleventh-century sequence Laetabundi iubilemus attributed to Adam of Saint Victor.

The hymn tells of the institution of the Eucharist and clearly expresses the belief of the Roman Catholic Church in transubstantiation and in Real presence, that is, that the bread and wine truly become permanently and irreversibly the Body and Blood of Christ when consecrated by a validly-ordained priest or bishop during the Mass. The fact that the hymn had been composed for the Holy Mass is testified by the sixth stanza: Dies enim solemnis agitur / In qua mensæ prima recolitur / Hujus institutio - On this festival divine / Which records the origin / Of the glorious Eucharist.

Lauda Sion is one of only four medieval sequences which were preserved in the Roman Missal published in 1570 following the Council of Trent (1545–1563) by will of Saint Pius V—the others being Victimae paschali laudes (Easter), Veni Sancte Spiritus (Pentecost), and Dies irae (requiem masses). (A fifth, Stabat Mater, would later be added in 1727.) Before Trent, many feasts had their own sequences. The existing versions were unified in the Roman Missal promulgated in 1570. The Lauda Sion is still sung today as a solemn Eucharistic hymn, though its use as a sequence is optional in the Ordinary Form of the Roman Rite. Before the reform of 1970, it was sung on Corpus Christi as a sequence between the gradual Oculi omnium and the Gospel of the day, after the verse of the Alleluia.

The sequence's English title is Sing forth, O Zion, sweetly sing or, as below, Sion, lift up thy voice and sing.

As with Aquinas's other three Eucharistic hymns, the last few stanzas of the Lauda Sion are often used alone, in this case, to form the Ecce panis Angelorum.

== Text ==
| Latin text | English translation |
|---|---|
| Lauda Sion Salvatórem Lauda ducem et pastórem In hymnis et cánticis. Quantum potes, tantum aude: Quia major omni laude, Nec laudáre súfficis. Laudis thema speciális, Panis vivus et vitális, Hódie propónitur. Quem in sacræ mensa cœnæ, Turbæ fratrum duodénæ Datum non ambígitur. Sit laus plena, sit sonóra, Sit jucúnda, sit decóra Mentis jubilátio. Dies enim solémnis ágitur, In qua mensæ prima recólitur Hujus institútio. In hac mensa novi Regis, Novum Pascha novæ legis, Phase vetus términat. Vetustátem nóvitas, Umbram fugat véritas, Noctem lux elíminat. Quod in cœna Christus gessit, Faciéndum hoc expréssit In sui memóriam. Docti sacris institútis, Panem, vinum, in salútis Consecrámus hóstiam. Dogma datur Christiánis, Quod in carnem transit panis, Et vinum in sánguinem. Quod non capis, quod non vides, Animósa firmat fides, Præter rerum ordinem. Sub divérsis speciébus, Signis tantum, et non rebus, Latent res exímiæ. Caro cibus, sanguis potus: Manet tamen Christus totus, Sub utráque spécie. A suménte non concísus, Non confráctus, non divísus: Integer accípitur. Sumit unus, sumunt mille: Quantum isti, tantum ille: Nec sumptus consúmitur. Sumunt boni, sumunt mali: Sorte tamen inæquáli, Vitæ vel intéritus. Mors est malis, vita bonis: Vide paris sumptiónis Quam sit dispar éxitus. Fracto demum Sacraménto, Ne vacílles, sed memento, Tantum esse sub fragménto, Quantum toto tégitur. Nulla rei fit scissúra: Signi tantum fit fractúra: Qua nec status nec statúra Signáti minúitur. Ecce panis Angelórum, Factus cibus viatórum: Vere panis filiórum, Non mitténdus cánibus. In figúris præsignátur, Cum Isaac immolátur: Agnus paschæ deputátur Datur manna pátribus. Bone pastor, panis vere, Jesu, nostri miserére: Tu nos pasce, nos tuére: Tu nos bona fac vidére In terra vivéntium. Tu, qui cuncta scis et vales: Qui nos pascis hic mortáles: Tuos ibi commensáles, Cohærédes et sodáles, Fac sanctórum cívium. Amen. Allelúja. | Sion, lift up thy voice and sing: Praise thy Savior and thy King, Praise with hymns thy shepherd true. All thou canst, do thou endeavour: Yet thy praise can equal never Such as merits thy great King. See today before us laid The living and life-giving Bread, Theme for praise and joy profound. The same which at the sacred board Was, by our incarnate Lord, Giv'n to His Apostles round. Let the praise be loud and high: Sweet and tranquil be the joy Felt today in every breast. On this festival divine Which records the origin Of the glorious Eucharist. On this table of the King, Our new Paschal offering Brings to end the olden rite. Here, for empty shadows fled, Is reality instead, Here, instead of darkness, light. His own act, at supper seated Christ ordain'd to be repeated In His memory divine; Wherefore now, with adoration, We, the host of our salvation, Consecrate from bread and wine. Hear, what holy Church maintaineth, That the bread its substance changeth Into Flesh, the wine to Blood. Doth it pass thy comprehending? Faith, the law of sight transcending Leaps to things not understood. Here beneath these signs are hidden Priceless things, to sense forbidden, Signs, not things, are all we see. Flesh from bread, and Blood from wine, Yet is Christ in either sign, All entire, confessed to be. They, who of Him here partake, Sever not, nor rend, nor break: But, entire, their Lord receive. Whether one or thousands eat: All receive the self-same meat: Nor the less for others leave. Both the wicked and the good Eat of this celestial Food: But with ends how opposite! Here 't is life: and there 't is death: The same, yet issuing to each In a difference infinite. Nor a single doubt retain, When they break the Host in twain, But that in each part remains What was in the whole before. Since the simple sign alone Suffers change in state or form: The signified remaining one And the same for evermore. Behold the Bread of Angels, For us pilgrims food, and token Of the promise by Christ spoken, Children's meat, to dogs denied. Shewn in Isaac's dedication, In the manna's preparation: In the Paschal immolation, In old types pre-signified. Jesu, shepherd of the sheep: Thou thy flock in safety keep, Living bread, thy life supply: Strengthen us, or else we die, Fill us with celestial grace. Thou, who feedest us below: Source of all we have or know: Grant that with Thy Saints above, Sitting at the feast of love, We may see Thee face to face. Amen. Alleluia. |

Another translation is used in the 1981 Lectionary approved for Australia and New Zealand (Volume 1, pages 601-603). It is by James Ambrose Dominic Aylward OP (1813-1872) and was published in Annus Sanctus in 1884, pages 194-196.

A 1773 translation into German, "Deinem Heiland, deinem Lehrer", by Franz Xaver Riedel is a procession hymn for the Feast of Corpus Christi.

== Reception ==
According to Dom Guéranger, Lauda Sion:

it is here that the utmost power of a Scholasticism, not crude and truncated, like that of today, but juicy and complete, like that of the Middle Ages, was able to bend the rhythm of the Latin language to the clear exposition and demand a dogma, as abstract for the theologian as it is sweet and consoling for the heart of the faithful.

== See also ==
- Veni Creator Spiritus
- Pange lingua
- Transubstantiation
