= Verbum supernum prodiens =

Latin Christian hymn text by Thomas Aquinas

"Verbum supernum prodiens" (literally: The word [descending] from above) is a Catholic hymn in long metre by St. Thomas Aquinas (1225–1274). It was written for the Hour of Lauds in the Divine Office of Corpus Christi. It is about the institution of the Eucharist by Christ at the Last Supper, and His Passion and death.

The last two verses form a hymn on their own as well, O salutaris hostia, which is sung at the adoration of the Blessed Sacrament.

There is also an unrelated Latin Nativity hymn of the same name.

== Latin text and English translation ==
Latin text	An English translation	Verse Rendering
1. Verbum supernum prodiens, Nec Patris linquens dexteram, Ad opus suum exiens, Venit ad vitæ vesperam.: 2. In mortem a discipulo; Suis tradendus æmulis, Prius in vitæ ferculo Se tradidit discipulis.: 3. Quibus sub bina specie; Carnem dedit et sanguinem; Ut duplicis substantiæ Totum cibaret hominem.: 4. Se nascens dedit socium, Convescens in edulium, Se moriens in pretium, Se regnans dat in præmium.: 5. O salutaris hostia, Quæ cæli pandis ostium, Bella premunt hostilia; Da robur, fer auxilium.: 6. Uni trinoque Domino; Sit sempiterna gloria: Qui vitam sine termino Nobis donet in patria.	The Word descending from above, without leaving the right hand of his Father, and going forth to do his work, reached the evening of his life. When about to be given over to his enemies by one of his disciples, to suffer death, he first gave himself to his disciples as the bread of life. Under a twofold appearance he gave them his flesh and his blood; that he might thus wholly feed us made up of a twofold substance. By his birth he gave himself as our companion; at the Last Supper he gave himself as our food; dying on the cross he gave himself as our ransom; reigning in heaven he gives himself as our reward O saving Victim, Who expandest the door of Heaven, Hostile wars press. Give strength; bear aid. To the Lord One in Three, May there be sempiternal glory; May He grant us life without end In the native land.	The heavenly Word proceeding forth, Yet leaving not his Father's side, And going to His work on Earth, Has reached at length life's eventide. By false disciple to be given To foemen for His blood athirst, Himself, the living bread from heaven, He gave to his disciples first. In twofold form of sacrament, He gave His flesh, He gave His blood, That man, of soul and body blent, Might wholly feed on mystic food. In birth man's fellow-man was He, His meat while sitting at the board; He died, our ransomer to be, He reigns to be our great reward. O saving Victim, opening wide The gate of heaven to man below; Our foes press hard on every side, Thine aid supply, Thy strength bestow. All praise and thanks to thee ascend For evermore, blessed One in Three; O grant us life that shall not end, In our true native land with Thee.

== See also ==
- Adoro te devote
- Lauda Sion
- O salutaris hostia
- Pange lingua gloriosi corporis mysterium
- Sacris solemniis
- Veni creator spiritus
- Saint Mass
