= Feast of Corpus Christi =

Catholic feast day, public holiday in some countries

Solemnity of the Most Holy Body and Blood of Christ
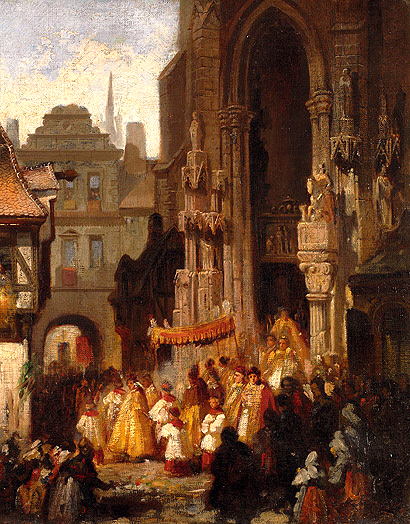
- Corpus Christi procession. Oil on canvas by Carl Emil Doepler.
- Official name: Solemnity of the Most Holy Body and Blood of Christ
- Also called: Corpus Domini
- Observed by: Catholic Church; Lutheran Churches; Anglican Communion; Old Catholic Church; Western Rite Orthodoxy; Public holiday in 25 countries (in 3 of them, only regionally): Austria; Brazil; Bolivia; Bosnia and Herzegovina; Colombia; Croatia; Dominican Republic; Haiti; East Timor; Equatorial Guinea; Parts of Germany; Grenada; Liechtenstein; Mexico; Monaco; Panama; Peru; Poland; Portugal; Saint Lucia; San Marino; Seychelles; Parts of Spain; Parts of Switzerland; Trinidad and Tobago
- Liturgical color: White
- Significance: Real Presence of Christ in the Eucharist
- Date: Thursday after Trinity Sunday; 60 days after Easter, or the Sunday immediately following this
- 2025 date: June 19
- 2026 date: June 4
- 2027 date: May 27
- 2028 date: June 15
- Frequency: Annual
- Related to: Maundy Thursday; Feast of the Sacred Heart; Feast of the Most Precious Blood

The Feast of Corpus Christi (Ecclesiastical Latin: Dies Sanctissimi Corporis et Sanguinis Domini Iesu Christi, lit. 'The Day of the Most Holy Body and Blood of Jesus Christ the Lord'), also known as the Solemnity of the Most Holy Body and Blood of Christ, is a liturgical solemnity celebrating the real presence of Christ in the Eucharist; the feast is observed by the Catholic Church, in addition to certain Western Orthodox, Lutheran, and Anglican churches. Nine weeks earlier, the institution of the Eucharist at the Last Supper is observed on Maundy Thursday in a sombre atmosphere leading to Good Friday. The liturgy on that day also commemorates Christ's washing of the disciples' feet, the institution of the priesthood, and the agony in the Garden of Gethsemane.

The feast of Corpus Christi was proposed by Thomas Aquinas, Doctor of the Church, to Pope Urban IV, in order to create a feast focused solely on the Holy Eucharist, emphasizing the joy of the Eucharist being the Body and Blood, Soul and Divinity of Jesus Christ. Having recognized in 1264 the authenticity of the Eucharistic Miracle of Bolsena, on input of Aquinas, the pontiff, then living in Orvieto, established the feast of Corpus Christi as a Solemnity and extended it to the whole Catholic Church.

The feast is liturgically celebrated on the Thursday after Trinity Sunday or, "where the Solemnity of The Most Holy Body and Blood of Christ is not a holy day of obligation, it is assigned to the Sunday after the Most Holy Trinity as its proper day".

At the end of Mass there is often a procession of the Blessed Sacrament, generally displayed in a monstrance. The procession is followed by the Benediction of the Blessed Sacrament. A notable Eucharistic procession is that presided over by the Pope each year in Rome, where it begins at the Archbasilica of St. John Lateran and passes to the Basilica of Saint Mary Major, where it concludes with the aforementioned Benediction. Corpus Christi wreaths, which are made of flowers, are hung on the doors and windows of the Christian faithful, in addition to being erected in gardens and fields.

The celebration of the feast was suppressed in many Protestant churches (especially those of a Calvinist persuasion) during the Reformation for theological reasons, because it celebrated the doctrine of the real presence. Though Lutheranism maintained the confession of the corporeal presence of Christ in the Eucharist via a sacramental union, in contrast, the Reformed affirmed a spiritual (pneumatic) presence. Today, most Protestant denominations do not recognize the feast day, with exception of certain Evangelical-Lutheran Churches and the Church of England, the latter of which abolished it in 1548 as the English Reformation progressed, but later reintroduced it. Some Anglican churches now observe Corpus Christi, sometimes under the name Thanksgiving for Holy Communion.

== History ==
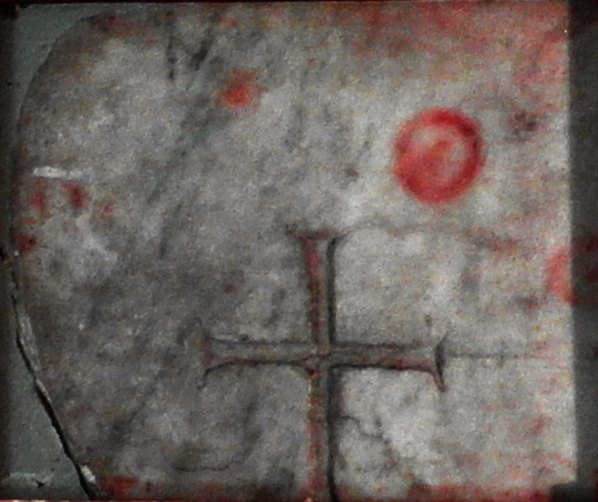
Rock of the Eucharistic Miracle in Bolsena (1263)

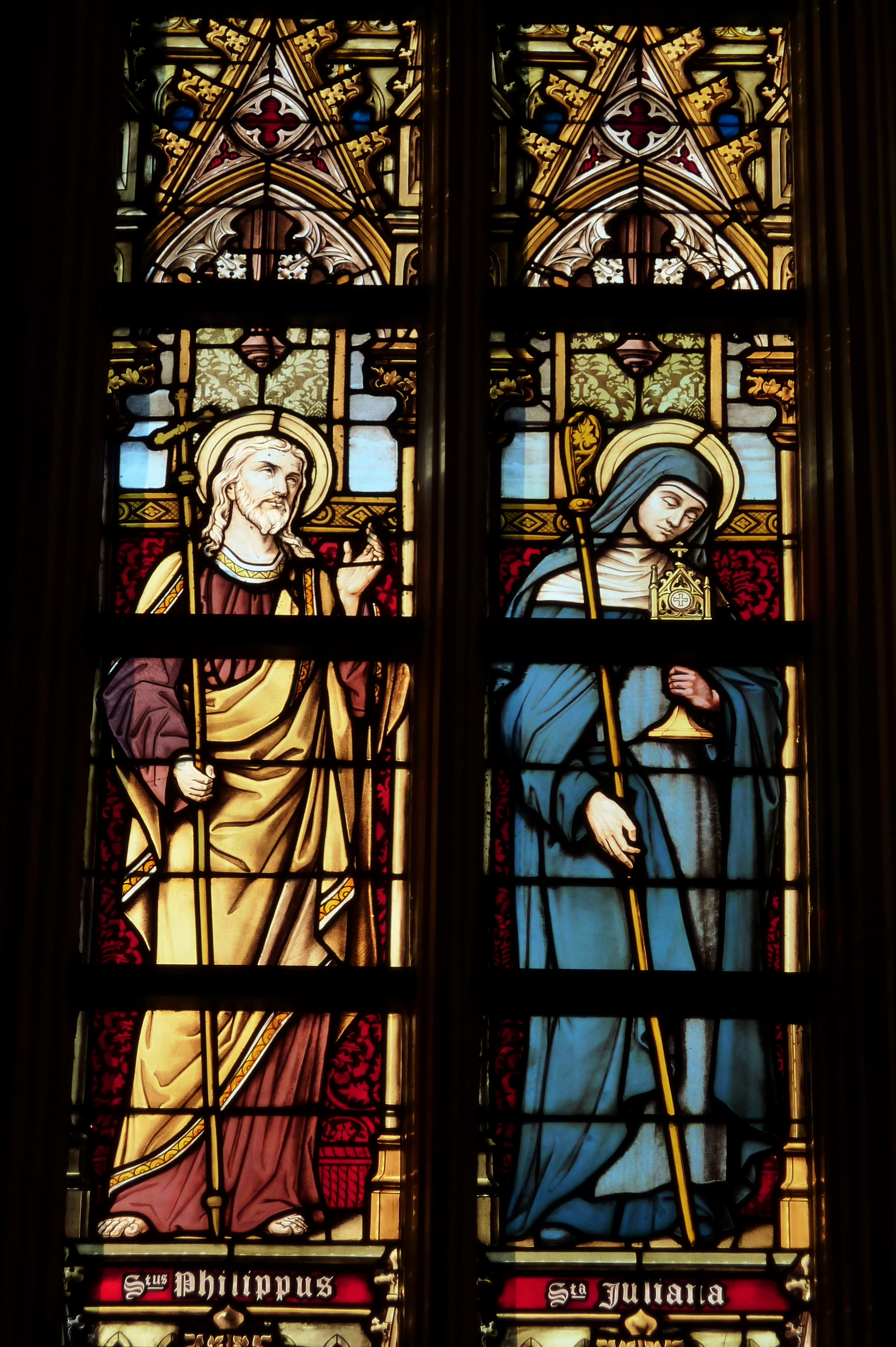
A stained glass window in the Saint Mary Basilica in Tongeren

The institution of Corpus Christi as a feast in the Christian calendar resulted from approximately forty years of work on the part of Juliana of Liège, a 13th-century Norbertine canoness, also known as Juliana de Cornillon, born in 1191 or 1192 in Liège, Belgium, a city where there were groups of women dedicated to Eucharistic worship. Guided by exemplary priests, they lived together, devoted to prayer and to charitable works. Orphaned at the age of five, she and her sister Agnes were entrusted to the care of the Augustinian nuns at the convent and leprosarium of Mont-Cornillon, where Juliana developed a special veneration for the Blessed Sacrament.

She always longed for a feast day outside of Lent in its honour. Her vita reports that this desire was enhanced by a vision of the church under the appearance of the full moon having one dark spot, which signified the absence of such a solemnity. In 1208, she reported her first vision of Christ in which she was instructed to plead for the institution of the feast of Corpus Christi. The vision was repeated for the next 20 years but she kept it a secret. When she eventually relayed it to her confessor, he relayed it to the bishop.

Juliana also petitioned the learned Dominican Hugh of St-Cher, and Robert de Thorete, Bishop of Liège. At that time bishops could order feasts in their dioceses, so Bishop Robert ordered in 1246 a celebration of Corpus Christi to be held in the diocese each year thereafter on the Thursday after Trinity Sunday. The first such celebration occurred at St Martin's Church in the city that same year.

Hugh of St-Cher travelled to Liège as Cardinal-Legate in 1251 and, finding that the feast was not being observed, reinstated it. In the following year, he established the feast for his whole jurisdiction (Germany, Dacia, Bohemia, and Moravia), to be celebrated on the Thursday after the Octave of Trinity (one week later than had been indicated for Liège), but with a certain elasticity, for he granted an indulgence for all who confessed their sins and attended church "on a date and in a place where [the feast] was celebrated".

Jacques Pantaléon of Troyes was also won over to the cause of the Feast of Corpus Christi during his ministry as Archdeacon in Liège under the diocesan bishop Robert of Thourotte. It was he who, having become Pope as Urban IV in 1264, instituted the Solemnity of Corpus Christi on the Thursday after the octave of Pentecost as a feast for the entire Latin Church, by the papal bull Transiturus de hoc mundo. The legend that this act was inspired by a procession to Orvieto in 1263, after a priest, Peter of Prague, and his congregation witnessed a Eucharistic miracle of a bleeding consecrated host at Bolsena, has been called into question by scholars who note problems in the dating of the miracle, whose tradition begins in the 14th century, and the interests of Urban IV, a former Archdeacon in Liège.

Though this was the first papally imposed universal feast for the Latin Church, it was not widely celebrated for half a century. It was adopted by a number of dioceses in Germany and by the Cistercians, and in 1295 was celebrated in Venice. It became a truly universal feast only after the bull of Urban IV was included in the collection of laws known as the Clementines, compiled under Pope Clement V, but promulgated only by his successor Pope John XXII in 1317.

While the institution of the Eucharist is celebrated on Holy (Maundy) Thursday, the liturgy on that day also commemorates Christ's washing of the disciples' feet, the institution of the priesthood and the agony in the Garden of Gethsemane. So many other functions took place on this day that the principal event was almost lost sight of. This is mentioned in the Bull Transiturus as the chief reason for the introduction of the new feast. Hence, the feast of Corpus Christi was established to create a feast focused solely on the Holy Eucharist.

Three versions of the office for the feast of Corpus Christi in extant manuscripts provide evidence for the Liège origins and voice of Juliana in an original office, which was followed by two later versions of the office. A highly sophisticated and polished version can be found in BNF 1143, a musical manuscript devoted entirely to the feast, upon which there is wide scholarly agreement: the version in BNF 1143 is a revision of an earlier version found in Prague, Abbey of Strahov MS D.E.I. 7, and represents the work of Thomas Aquinas following or during his residency at Orvieto from 1259 to 1265. The office can also be found in the 1343 codex Regimen Animarum. This liturgy may be used as a votive Mass of the Blessed Sacrament on weekdays in ordinary time. The hymn Aquinas composed for Vespers of Corpus Christi, Pange Lingua or another eucharistic hymn, is also used on Maundy Thursday during the procession of the Blessed Sacrament to the altar of repose.

The last two verses of Pange Lingua are also used as a separate hymn, Tantum Ergo, which is sung at Benediction of the Blessed Sacrament. O Salutaris Hostia, another hymn sung at Benediction of the Blessed Sacrament, comprises the last two verses of Verbum Supernum Prodiens, Aquinas' hymn for Lauds of Corpus Christi. Aquinas also composed the propers for the Mass of Corpus Christi, including the sequence Lauda Sion Salvatorem. The epistle reading for the Mass was taken from Paul's First Epistle to the Corinthians (1 Corinthians 11:23–29), and the Gospel reading was taken from the Gospel of John (John 6:56–59).

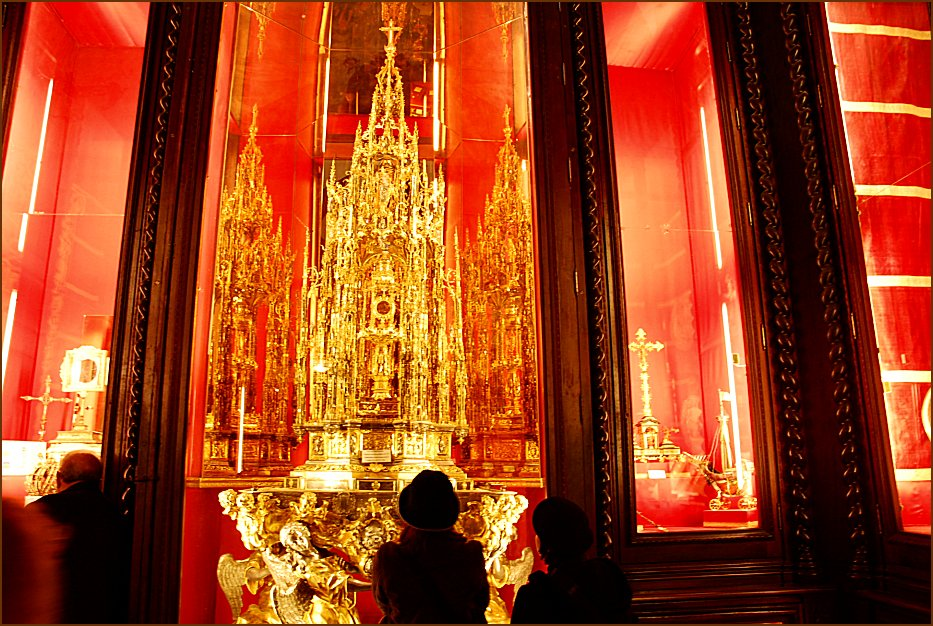
Silver-gilt Corpus Christi monstrance of Toledo, Spain

When Pope Pius V revised the General Roman Calendar (see Tridentine calendar), Corpus Christi was one of only two "feasts of devotion" that he kept, the other being Trinity Sunday. In that calendar, Corpus Christi was celebrated on the Thursday after Trinity Sunday. The feast had an octave until 1955, when Pope Pius XII suppressed all octaves, even in local calendars, except those of Christmas, Easter and Pentecost (see General Roman Calendar of Pope Pius XII).

From 1849 until 1969, a separate Feast of the Most Precious Blood of Our Lord Jesus Christ was assigned originally to the first Sunday in July, later to the first day of the month. This feast was removed from the General Roman Calendar in 1969, "because the Most Precious Blood of Christ the Redeemer is already venerated in the solemnities of the Passion, of Corpus Christi and of the Sacred Heart of Jesus and in the feast of the Exaltation of the Holy Cross. But the Mass of the Most Precious Blood of Our Lord Jesus Christ is placed among the votive Masses".

== Celebration ==
=== Western Christianity ===
==== Catholic Church ====
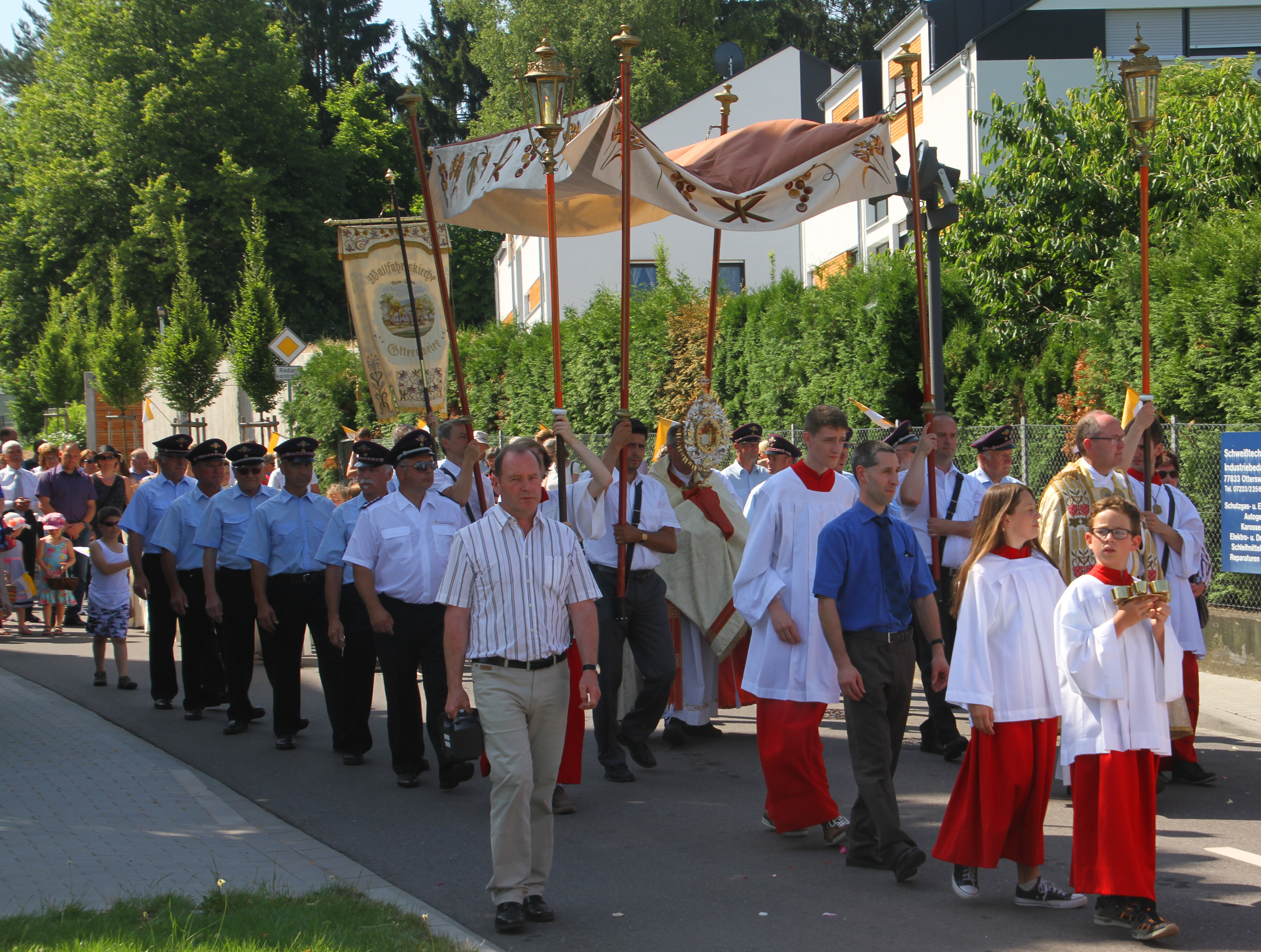
Procession in Ottersweier, Germany

In many countries, the day is a holy day of obligation to participate in the celebration of Mass and takes place on the Thursday after Trinity Sunday. On that day or on the following Sunday, which is the feast day where it is not a holy day of obligation, it is traditional to hold in the streets of a town or in an individual parish a procession with prayers and singing to honor the Blessed Sacrament. During the procession, the consecrated host is displayed in a monstrance held aloft by a member of the clergy. At the end of the procession, Benediction of the Blessed Sacrament is imparted. In England and Wales the Conference of Bishops decided in 2006 to celebrate the feast on the Sunday after Trinity Sunday, and they reaffirmed this decision in 2017 because Eucharistic Processions and other devotional practices could then more easily be conducted.

The feast of Corpus Christi is one of five occasions in the year on which a diocesan bishop is not to be away from his diocese unless for a grave and urgent reason.

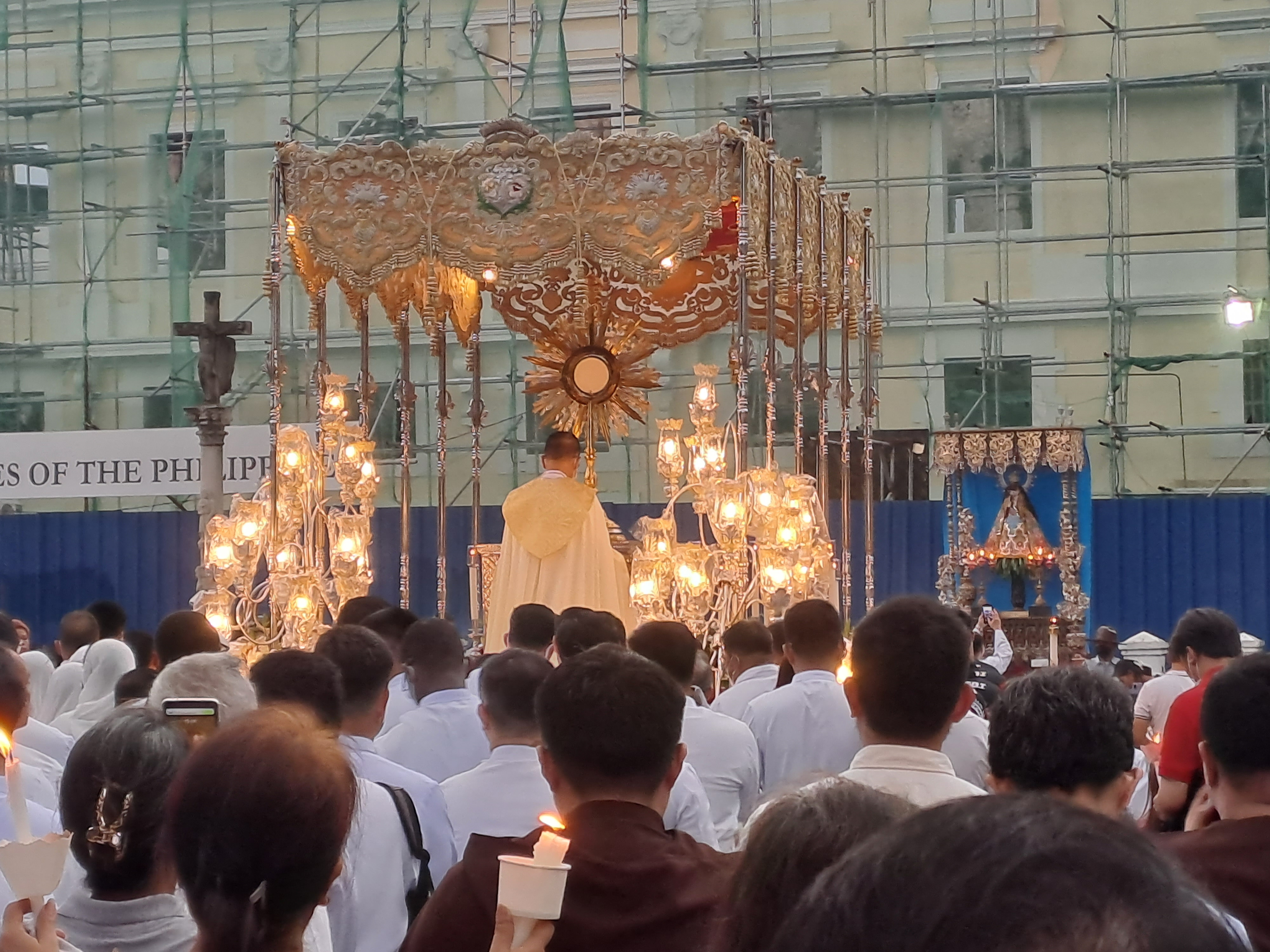
A procession in Manila, Philippines, where the monstrance is placed upon a canopied carroza (processional carriage), rather than being held by a walking cleric. The Archbishop of Manila, Cardinal Jose Advincula, kneels before the Blessed Sacrament during the entire procession.

A notable procession in the Philippines is that of the Archdiocese of Manila. The archbishop celebrates a mid-afternoon Mass at the Shrine of the Blessed Sacrament in Santa Cruz before presiding over a procession to his see at Manila Cathedral.

==== Lutheranism ====
Historically, the Evangelical-Lutheran countries of Sweden and Prussia have marked Corpus Christi as a public holiday.

Regarding certain observances held on Corpus Christi during his time, Martin Luther spoke out against processing with the consecrated elements, which he viewed as "only play-acting" and "just vain idolatry". In one of his postils (homilies), he wrote

I am to no festival more hostile … than this one. Because it is the most shameful festival. At no festival are God and his Christ more blasphemed, than on this day, and particularly by the procession. For then people are treating the Blessed Sacrament with such ignominy that it becomes only play-acting and is just vain idolatry. With its cosmetics and false holiness it conflicts with Christ's order and establishment. Because He never commanded us to carry on like this. Therefore, beware of such worship!

Many personal opinions of Martin Luther were not adopted by the Lutheran Churches, however, and because Lutheranism retained much of the pre-Reformation liturgical and devotional practices, the Lutheran Reformation is generally considered to be the most conservative among the Protestant traditions. The Feast of Corpus Christi was retained in the calendars of the Lutheran Church until about 1600. Lutherans were recorded to have prominent celebrations of the Feast of Corpus Christi in Dessau (1532), Brandenburg (1540), and Brandenburg-Ansbach-Kulmbach (1548). The Feast of Corpus Christi continues to be celebrated in certain Lutheran churches, particularly those of Evangelical Catholic churchmanship.

==== Anglicanism ====
The celebration of Corpus Christi was abolished in England in 1548. However, in the Church of England, since the 2000 edition of "Common Worship", "the Thursday after Trinity Sunday may be observed as the Day of Thanksgiving for the Institution of Holy Communion (Corpus Christi)" as one of the church's Festivals and with a special liturgy.

The feast is also celebrated by Anglican parishes of Anglo-Catholic churchmanship, even in provinces of the Anglican Communion that do not officially include it in their calendars. McCausland's Order of Divine Service, the most commonly used ordo in the Anglican Church of Canada, provides lections for the day.. In South Africa churches of the Anglo-catholic tradition celebrate Corpus Christi on the Sunday after the traditional Thursday.

==== Old Catholicism and Western-Rite Orthodoxy ====
Corpus Christi is also celebrated by the Old Catholic Church, the Liberal Catholic Church and by some Western Rite Orthodox Christians.

==== Reformed ====
Followers of the Reformed tradition (including the Continental Reformed, Presbyterian and Congregationalist denominations) do not observe the feast.

=== Eastern Christianity ===
==== Byzantine rite: Italo-Greek and Ukrainian traditions ====
Eucharistic devotion in Byzantine rite before introduction of the feast of Holy Eucharist was primarily expressed in the offices of preparation to Holy Communion, that borrow their structure from the liturgical hour of Orthros (appropriate psalms followed by a Canon and a sequence of prayers). In the most developed form, practiced in old believer communities, the preparation for Communion includes also three minor hours adapted for the occasion.

As both the devotion to the Eucharist and the texts that can be put to liturgical use existed by that time, the Byzantine rite Christians of South Italy who were in communion with the Pope at time of Transitus de hoc mundo, were quick to arrange them into a new feast that was set on the same date as in the Roman Rite. From the beginning of the 14th century, manuscripts of Grottaferrata liturgical books include the feast of "Holy and Immaculate Body and Blood of our Lord Jesus Christ", with liturgical texts taken from either preparation to Communion prayers, or the preexisting feasts, e.g. Holy Thursday. Over the following centuries, new texts were added to them.

After the Union of Brest, Ruthenian Greek Catholics gained access to educational institutions in Rome, and became familiar with Italo-Byzantine feast of the Holy and Immaculate Body and Blood of our Lord Jesus Christ. This liturgical tradition became the foundation of adopting this feast in Ukrainian Greek Catholic Church, having the Italo-Greek texts as its core, and adding some new proper compositions. In fact, before the standardization of the texts of the feast around the time of the Synod of Zamoisk, it existed in existed several versions, that shows its "bottom-to-top" origins, as opposed to the idea of it being introduced forcefully by a Latin-minded central authority. The only properly Latin elements of the celebration were the Synaxarion that is adapted from a homily of Thomas Aquinas. In the current use of UGCC, this element is excluded.

=== Folk traditions ===
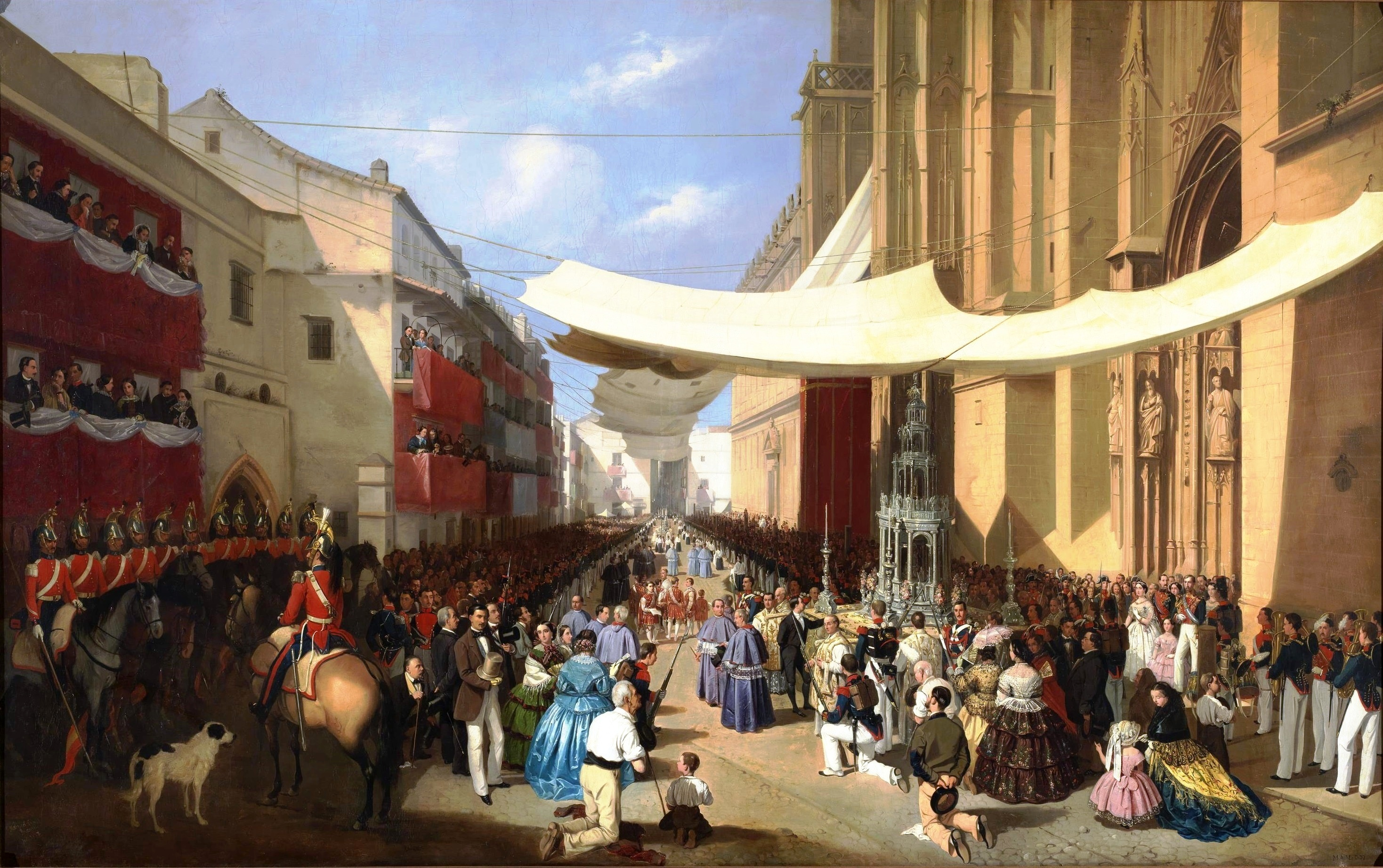
Corpus Christi procession in Seville in the 19th century

On the eve of the Feast of Corpus Christi, clergy bless Corpus Christi wreaths that are made of flowers. Corpus Christi wreaths and bouquets are often "attached to flags and banners, to houses, and to the arches of green boughs that span the streets." In Christian homes, these Corpus Christi wreaths are suspended on walls or displayed on doors and in windows. Corpus Christi wreaths are also "put up in gardens, fields, and pastures, with a prayer for protection and blessing upon the growing harvest."

Throughout Christendom, "the custom developed of carrying the Blessed Sacrament in a splendid procession through the town after the Mass on Corpus Christi Day." The monstrance which holds the host is surrounded by a Corpus Christi wreath of flowers. During the procession, church bells are rung and "the faithful kneel in front of their homes to adore the Eucharistic Lord." Along the route in which the procession occurs, Christian homes "are decorated with little birch trees and green boughs", with candles being lit in the windows. Oftentimes, stops are made at various points called "stations" during the procession and "the Blessed Sacrament is put on an altar table" while a Gospel passage is read and hymns are sung, along with prayer being made.

==== Austria ====
As Corpus Christi is a solemnity of the Catholic liturgical year, it is a public holiday in Austria.

==== Brazil and Portugal ====
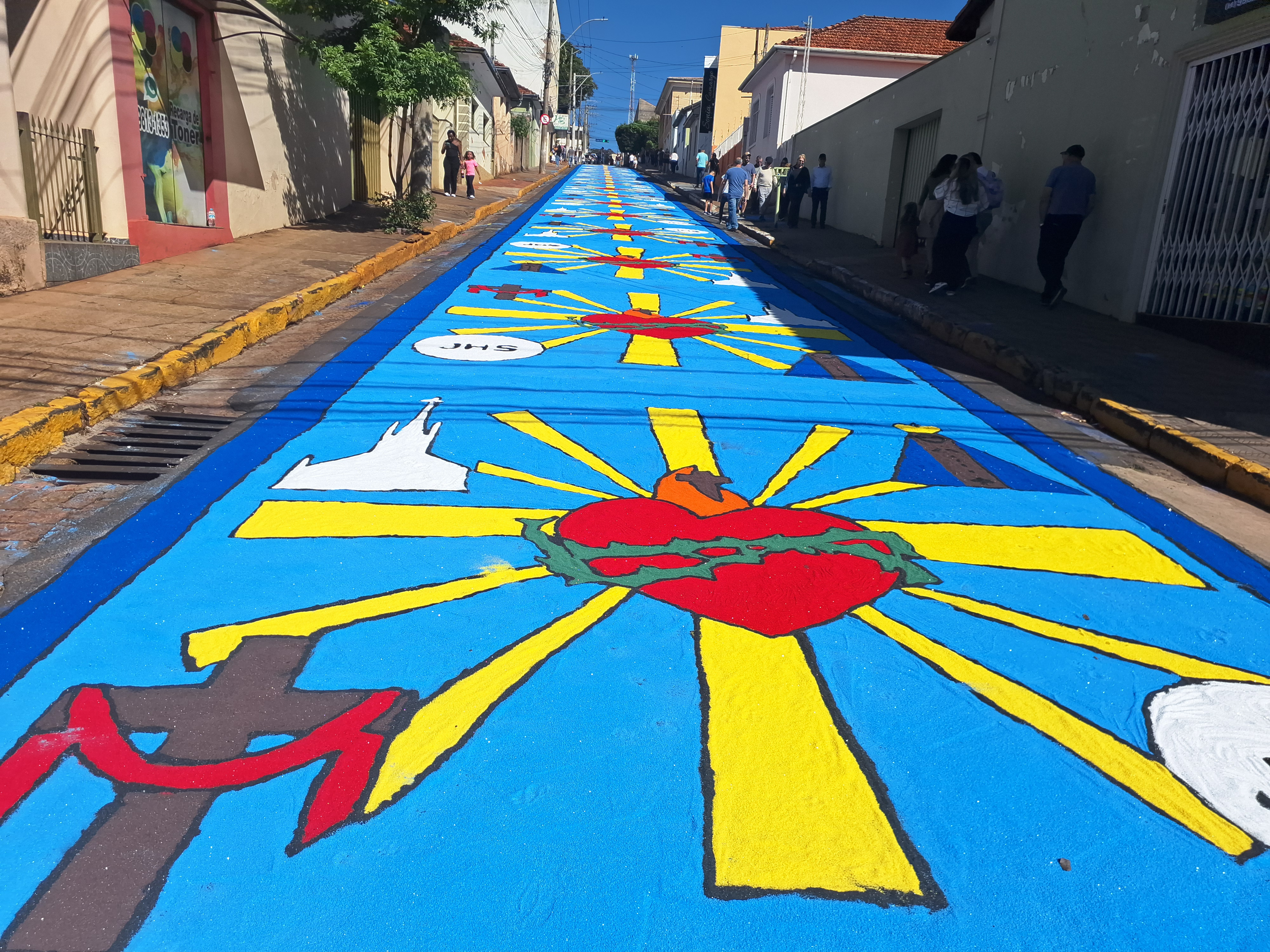
Corpus Christi carpet in São Manuel, São Paulo, Brazil.

Street carpets for the Feast of Corpus Christi (Tapetes de Corpus Christi) are made of different materials such as coffee grounds, flowers, sand, and salt.

==== Croatia ====
In Croatian language, there are various names for the Feast: Brašančevo (after hypocorism brašance of the noun brašno, meaning "flour"; dating from 18th century and used in Požega area, Otok, Varoš, Sikirevci and southern Baranja, Luč, as well among Croats of Vojvodina and Herzegovina) with variations (Brošančevo, Brešančevo), Korosante (from Latin Corpo Sancto; used in Dubrovnik area and Pelješac), Božji dan (Božji don; literally "Lord's Day") and Božji blagdan (lit. "Lord's/God's Feast").

Feast (officially known as Tijelovo) is a national holiday and non-working day in Croatia since 2001. Around churches and in the city centers processions are held, headed with priests carrying Blessed Altair Sacrament. They are usually followed by four men carrying a canopy above the Sacrament and children in white who throw flower petals (usually rose) along the way.

==== England ====
In medieval times in many parts of Europe, Corpus Christi was a time for the performance of mystery plays. The plays in York, England, were performed on Corpus Christi Day for some 200 years until their suppression in the sixteenth century during the Protestant Reformation.

The Guild of Corpus Christi was common in English towns and centered around the feast, and one of these guilds transformed into Corpus Christi College, Cambridge.

==== Peru ====
In the southern highlands of the Cusco Region of Peru, the festival of Quyllurit'i is held near Corpus Christi in the Sinaqara Valley. As many as 10,000 pilgrims come from neighboring areas. Culminating on Trinity Sunday, this festival marks the return in the sky of the Pleiades constellation, known in the Quechua language as Qullqa, or "storehouse", as it is associated with the upcoming harvest and New Year. The festival precedes the official feast of Corpus Christi, held the Thursday following Trinity Sunday, but it is closely associated with it.

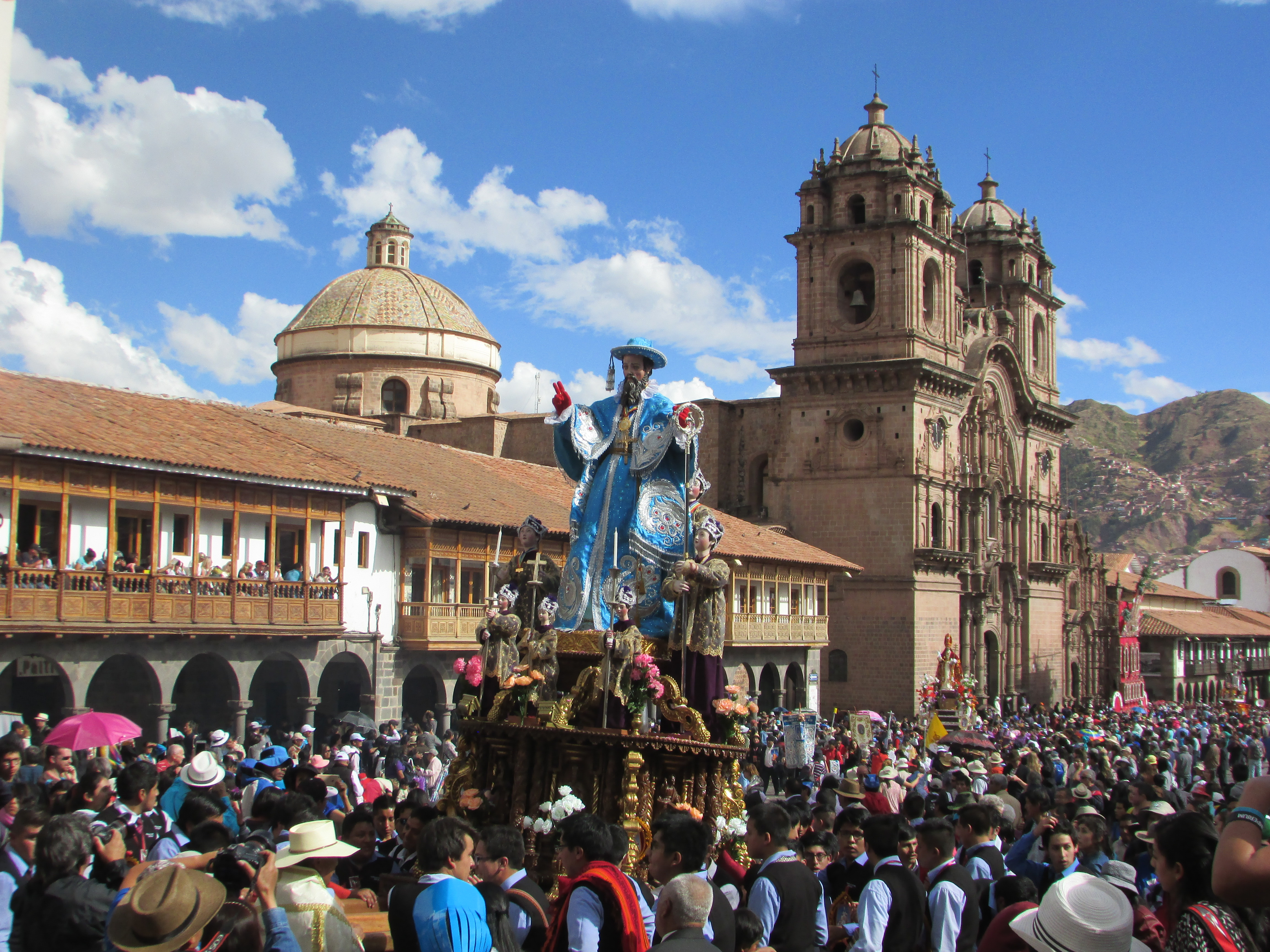
Saint Blaise procession in the Plaza de Armas

The official feast on Thursday is a baroque display of religious syncretism between Catholicism and Incan traditions. Ten days before the main event, the Virgin of Bethlehem and Saint Joseph are taken in procession to the Church of Santa Clara. On the main day, the Eucharist is celebrated with a special mass and a procession around the main square, followed by a procession of saint images, including Saint Jerome, Saint Sebastian, Saint Anne, Saint Barbara, Saint James, Saint Blaise, Saint Anthony the Abbot, Saint Christopher, the Virgin of Remedies, the Virgin of the Nativity, the Purified Virgin, the Virgin of Bethlehem, and the Virgin of the Immaculate Conception.

The saints remain in the Cusco Cathedral for eight days, where they are believed to "debate" the city's future and the behavior of the faithful. Afterward, they have a farewell procession around the Plaza de Armas and return to their respective temples over the following week. The festival also features the consumption of "chiriuchu," a traditional dish.

==== Poland ====
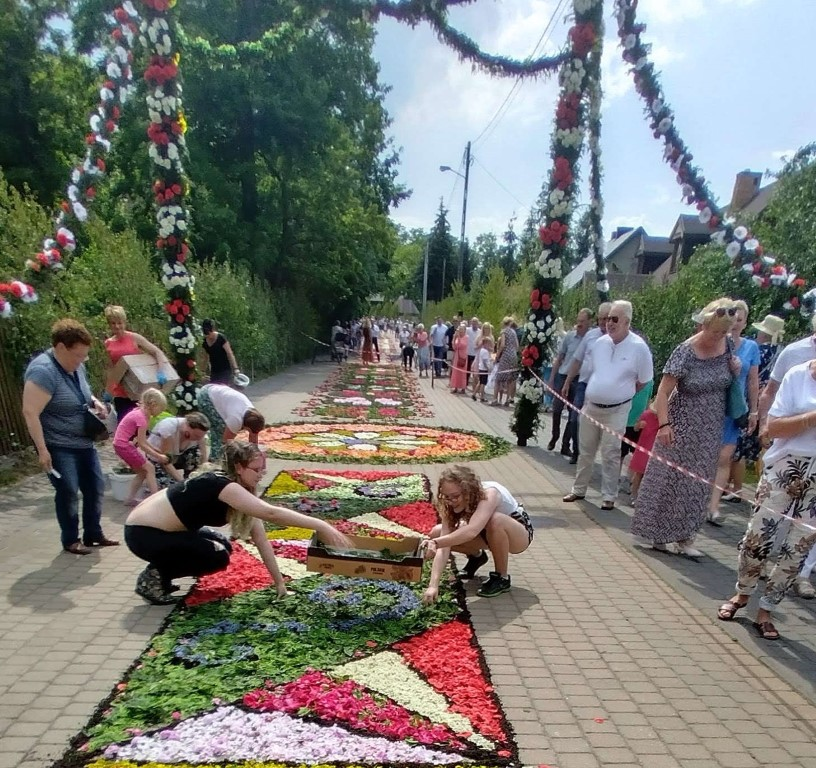
Spycimierz, Poland

In Spycimierz in central Poland (Gmina Uniejów), parishioners arrange a carpet of live flowers about one kilometre long. A solemn procession passes over it at 5 pm. Long carpets of flowers are also laid in four parishes in the Opole Voivodeship in southern Poland. Flower carpets tradition for Corpus Christi processions was inscribed on the UNESCO Representative List of the Intangible Cultural Heritage of Humanity in 2021.

==== Spain ====
In Spain, Corpus Christi is celebrated in all dioceses. It has special relevance in Castilla-La Mancha, a community that marks this date as a holiday.

===== Andalucia =====
The celebrations in Seville are depicted in a section of Iberia, the masterpiece of the composer Albéniz.

===== Castile-La Mancha =====
Corpus Christi is one of the main festivals in Toledo, Spain.

===== Castile and León =====
In the village of Castrillo de Murcia near Burgos, the celebration includes the practice of El Colacho (baby jumping).

===== Catalonia =====
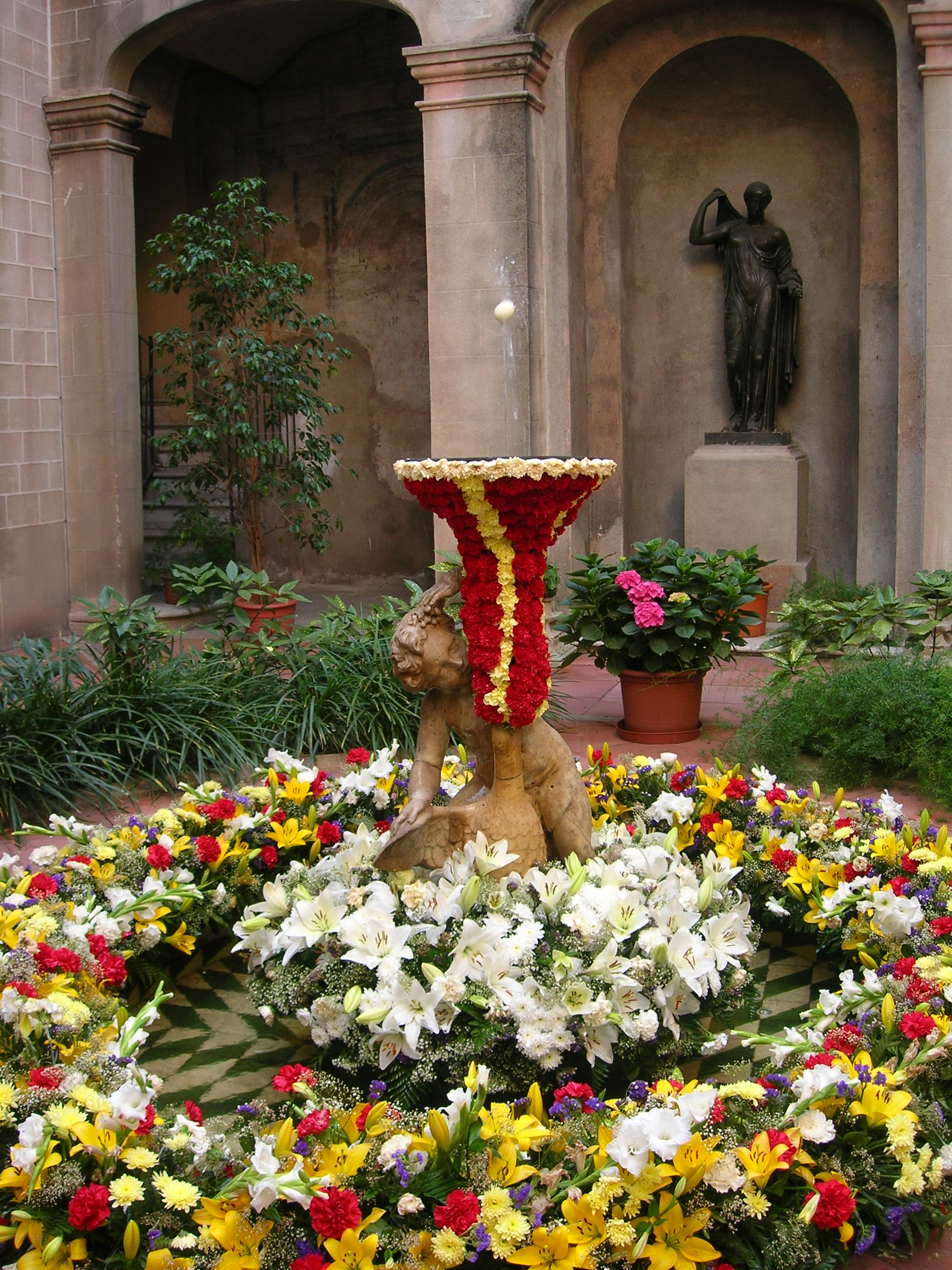
Dancing egg, Barcelona

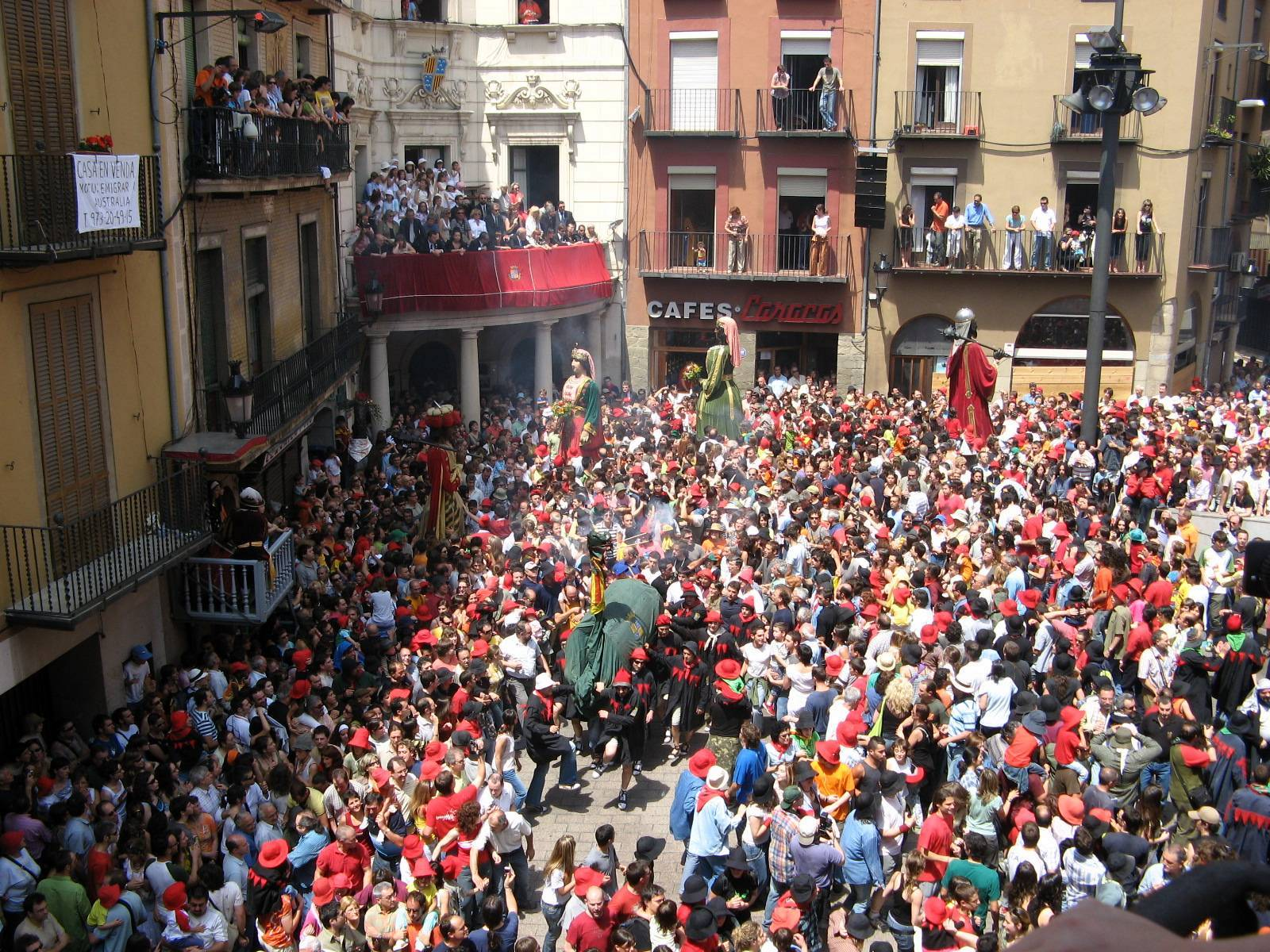
Patum de Berga

In Catalonia, Corpus Christi is celebrated with the tradition of the dancing egg. There is evidence this tradition dates from the 16th century.

The Patum de Berga is a popular and traditional festival that is celebrated each year in the Catalan city of Berga (Barcelona) during Corpus Christi. It consists of a series of "dances" (balls) by townspeople dressed as mystical and symbolical figures. The balls are marked by their solemnity and their ample use of fire and pyrotechnics. It was declared a Traditional Festival of National Interest by the Generalitat de Catalunya in 1983, and as a Masterpiece of the Oral and Intangible Heritage of Humanity by UNESCO in 2005.

===== Galicia =====
Like many other religious feasts in NW Spain, these celebrations are intermingled with pre-Catholic customs. As in Poland, there is some tradition of floral carpets in different towns, to the point that the Corpus Christi in Ponteareas (gl) is a Traditional Festival of International Interest since 2009, the carpet making being the reason for a town sisterhood with La Orotava (Tenerife). Other places of this time are the floral carpets of Ares or Festa da coca in Redondela or Betanzos (both named after the same mythological beast like in the Portuguese border town of Monção).

===== Valencia =====
The Corpus Christi procession in Valencia is one of the oldest on the Iberian Peninsula. The first procession was established on 4 June 1355 by the Bishop of Valencia, Hug de Fenollet, and by 1372 it had become an annual event. Known historically in Valencian as the Festa Grossa ("Great Festival"), it is considered the city's most important traditional celebration. The procession features the Rocas, eleven wooden triumphal floats dating from between 1373 and 1392, as well as traditional dances including the Dansa de la Moma. A miniature representation of the procession, comprising over 1,200 figures created by the Valencian craftsman Vicente Juliá ("Chauve"), is preserved at the L'Iber, Museum of Toy Soldiers in Valencia.

== Date ==
Dates for Corpus Christi 2021–2031 (Gregorian calendar)
Year	Thursday	Sunday
2021	June 3	June 6
2022	June 16	June 19
2023	June 8	June 11
2024	May 30	June 2
2025	June 19	June 22
2026	June 4	June 7
2027	May 27	May 30
2028	June 15	June 18
2029	May 31	June 3
2030	June 20	June 23
2031	June 12	June 15

Corpus Christi is a moveable feast, celebrated on the Thursday after Trinity Sunday, 60 days after Easter, or, in countries where it is not a holy day of obligation, on the following Sunday.

The earliest possible Thursday celebration falls on May 21 (as in 1818 and 2285), the latest on June 24 (as in 1943 and 2038). The Sunday celebration of the feast, introduced in the second half of the 20th century, occurs three days later, between May 24 at earliest (for the first time in 2285) and June 27 at latest (for the first time in 2038). For Western Rite Orthodox Christians, since they use the Julian calendar, at least for all Feast Days dependent on the date of Pascha, their date of the celebration of Corpus Christi, translates to, in the Gregorian calendar, from June 3 at the earliest, to July 7, at the latest.

Corpus Christi is a public holiday in some countries with a predominantly Catholic population including, among others, Argentina, Austria, Bolivia, parts of Bosnia and Herzegovina, Brazil, Colombia, Croatia, Dominican Republic, East Timor, Equatorial Guinea, parts of Germany, Grenada, Haiti, Jerusalem in Israel, Liechtenstein, Monaco, Paraguay, Peru, Poland, Portugal, Saint Lucia, San Marino, Spain, parts of Switzerland, Trinidad and Tobago, parts of the United States (including parts of Puerto Rico), and Venezuela.

== See also ==
- Adoro te devote
- Dancing devils of Corpus Christi
- Feast of the Most Pure Heart of Mary
- Feast of the Sacred Heart
- Lauda Sion
- List of festivals in Costa Rica
- Pange lingua gloriosi corporis mysterium
- Sacris solemniis
- Spello's Infiorate
- Transubstantiation
- Verbum supernum prodiens

== Literature ==
- Dragić, Marko (2019). "Tijelovo u hrvatskoj katoličkoj crkveno-pučkoj kulturnoj baštini" [The Feast of Corpus Christi in Croatian Catholic Church-Folk Cultural Heritage]. Crkva u Svijetu. 54 (1): 59–81. doi:10.34075/cs.54.1.4. S2CID 189152720.
