= Kāla =

Hindu deity and concept

Kala (Sanskrit: काल, romanized: Kālá/Kālam, IPA: [kɑːˈlə]) is a Sanskrit term that means 'time' or 'death'. As time personified, destroying all things, Kala is a god of death, and often used as one of the epithets of Yama. In Shaivism, Kala is known as the fiery avatar of Shiva, Kala Bhairava or Kalagni Rudra; and in Vaishnavism Kala is also associated with Narasimha and Pralaya. As applied to gods and goddesses, Kālá is not always distinguishable from kāla, meaning 'black'.

== Etymology ==
Monier-Williams's widely used Sanskrit-English dictionary lists two distinct words with the form kāla:

- kāla 1 means "black, of a dark colour, dark-blue ..." and has a feminine form ending in ī – kālī – as mentioned in Pāṇini 4–1, 42.
- kālá 2 means "a fixed or right point of time, a space of time, time ... destiny, fate ... death" and has a feminine form (found at the end of compounds) ending in ā, as mentioned in the ṛgveda Prātiśākhya. As a traditional Hindu unit of time, one kālá corresponds to 144 seconds.

According to Monier-Williams, kāla 2 is from the verbal root kal "to calculate", while the root of kāla 1 is uncertain, though possibly the same.

As applied to gods and goddesses in works such as the Devī Māhātmya and the Skanda Purāṇa, kāla 1 and kāla 2 are not readily distinguishable. Thus Wendy Doniger, translating a conversation between Śiva and Pārvatī from the Skanda Purāṇa, says Mahākāla may mean " 'the Great Death' ... or 'the Great Black One' ". And Swāmī Jagadīśvarānanda, a Hindu translator of the Devī Māhātmya, renders the feminine compound kāla-rātri (where rātri means "night") as "dark night of periodic dissolution".

== Deity ==
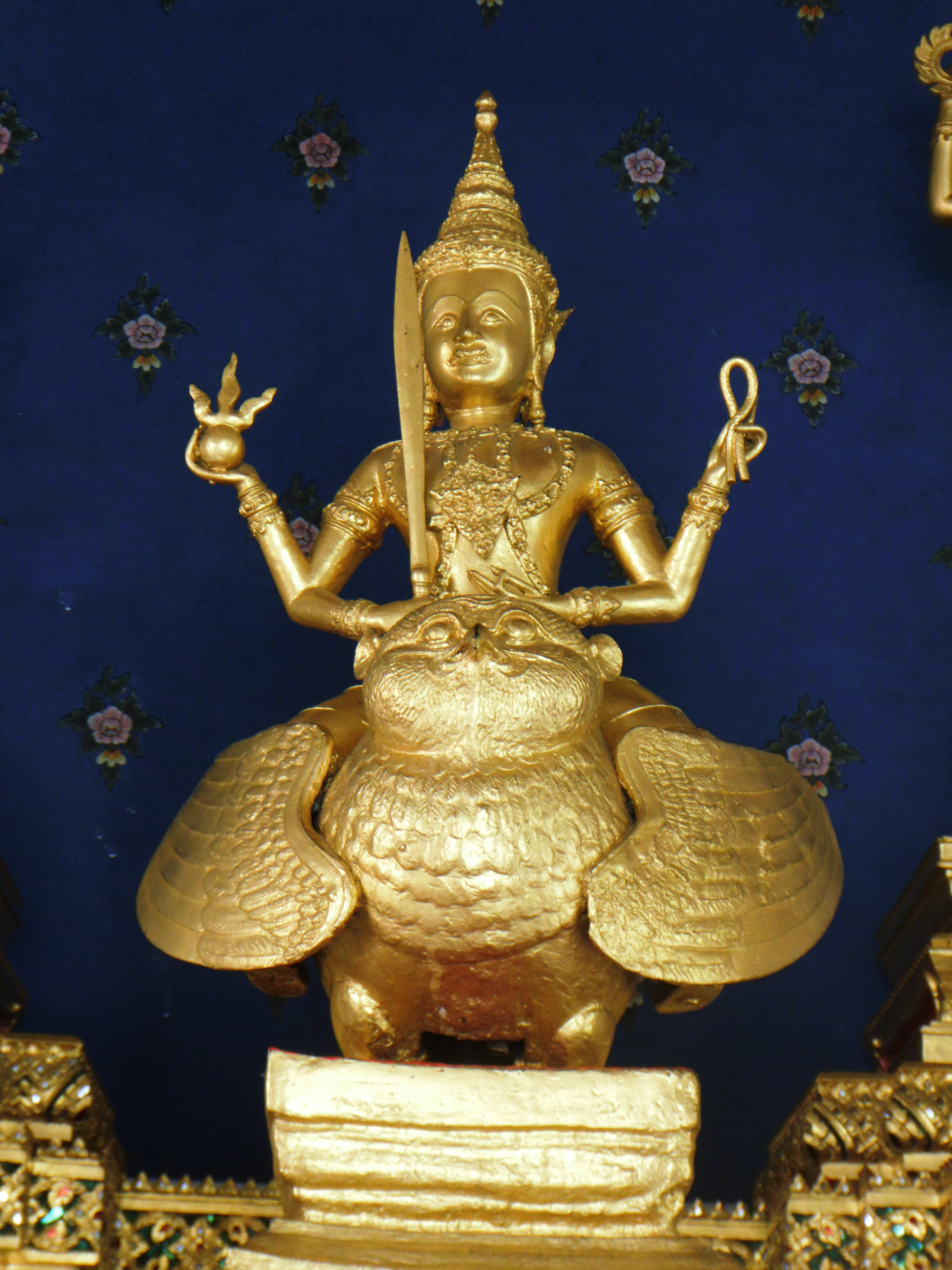
The Statue of Kala dev, Early Rattanakosin art (19 -21st century), Bangkok City Pillar Shrine.

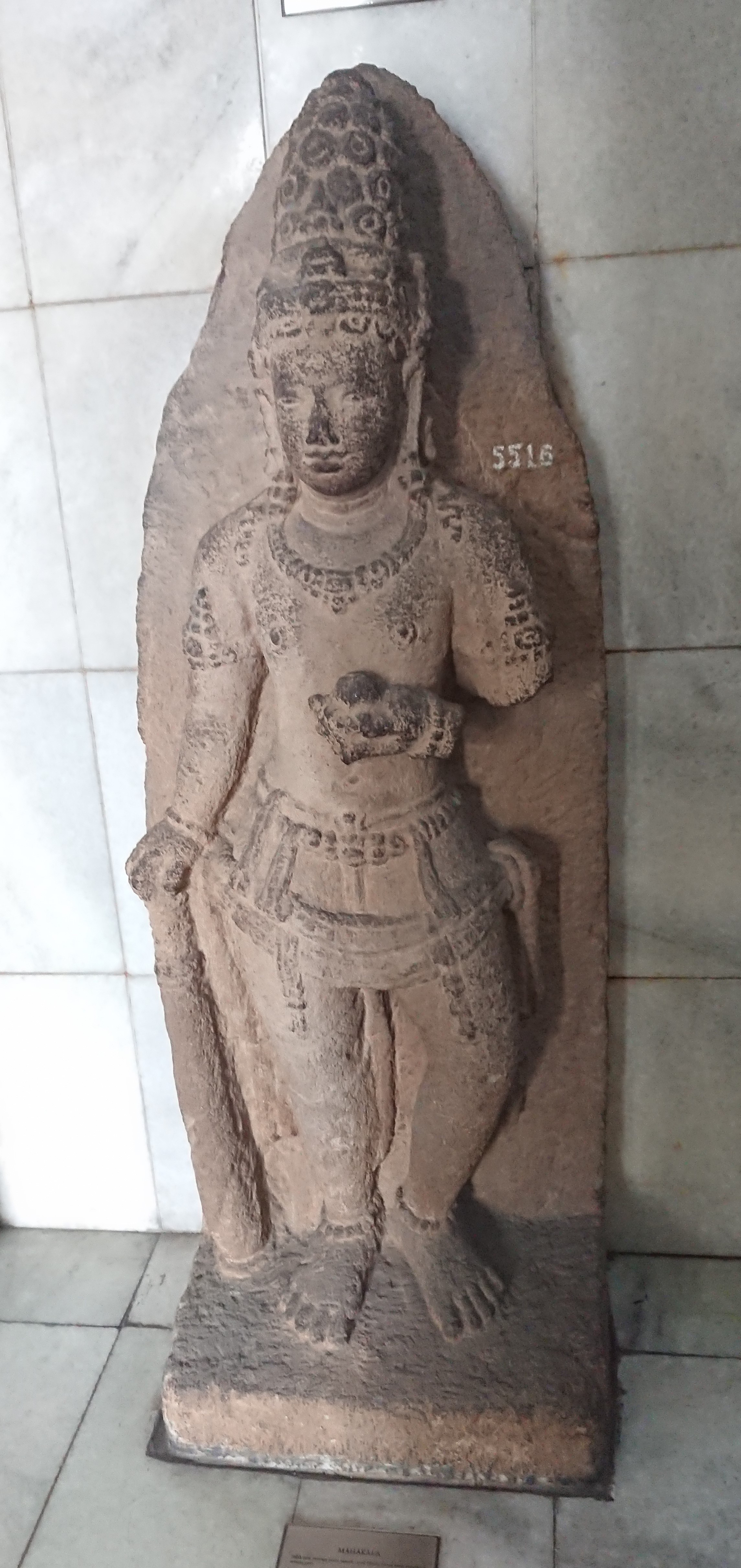
The Statue of Kala dev, National Museum of Indonesia.

=== Atharva Ved ===
Kala is described in 19th Kanda Sukta 53 and 54 in the Atharvaved as a deity in which the mind, breath and name of God pervades. In the Atharvaved, it is called the "first god" (prathama deva) and considered to be identical with Prajapati, the creator god. Kala is also understood as the cause of the birth and death of living things, and also all the activities that they do in the world. Kala is analogized to an ageless horse possessing thousand eyes.

=== Epics and the Puranas ===
Kala appears as an impersonal deity within the Mahabharata, the Ramayana, and the Bhagavata Purana. In the Bhagavad Gita (11.32), Krishna, one of the main characters, reveals his identity as Time personified. He states to Arjuna that both sides on the battlefield of the Kurukshetra War have already been annihilated. At the end of the epic, the entire Yadu dynasty (Krishna's dynasty) is similarly annihilated.

In the Mahabharata, kala is associated with the senses of death and destiny. Time is given agency and said to "assail" people. It often becomes visible through omens or indications of time (nimitta) that reveal the course of future events. To interpret omens, one has to be an "expert of time" (kālavādin), examples of which are Vyāsa and Krishna, who have astrological understanding. Destiny can, however, be challenged by agents who act to accomplish the result that they desire.

Kala appears in the Uttara Kanda of the Ramayana, as the messenger of Death (Yama). At the end of the story, Time, in the form of inevitability or necessity, informs Rama that his reign on Earth is now over. By a trick or dilemma, he forces the death of Lakshmana, and informs Rama that he must return to the realm of the gods. Lakshmana willingly passes away with Rama's blessing and Rama returns to Vaikuntha.

Time appears in the Bhagavata Purana as the force that is responsible for the imperceptible and inevitable change in the entire creation. According to the Purana, all created things are illusory, and thereby subject to creation and annihilation, this imperceptible and inconceivable impermanence is said to be due to the march of Time. Similarly, Time is considered to be the unmanifest aspect of God that remains after the destruction of the entire world at the end of a lifespan of Brahma. According to Soifer, Narasimha is explicitly linked with Pralaya or Yuganta itself in Bhagavata Purana, Linga Purana, and Kurma Purana versions; he is said to appear like Kala or the fire of destruction, both agents of Pralaya.

In the Chaitanya Bhagavata, a Gaudiya Vaishnava text and biography of Chaitanya Mahaprabhu, it is said that the fire that emerges from the mouth of Sankarshana at the End of Time is the Kālānala, or "fire of Time". One of the names of Sankarshana is kālāgni, also "fire of time".

The Vishnu Purana also states that Time (kala) is one of the four primary forms of Vishnu, the others being matter (Pradhana), visible substance (vyakta), and Spirit (Purusha). According to Pinchman, "It is said that at the time of primordial creation, three forms arise from Vishnu: time (kala), purusha, and prakrti".

=== Bhagavad Gita ===
At Bhagavad Gita 11.32, Krishna takes on the form of kāla, the destroyer, announcing to Arjuna that all the warriors on both sides will be killed, apart from the Pandavas:

कालो ऽस्मि लोकक्षयकृत् प्रवृद्धो लोकान् समाहर्तुम् इह प्रवृत्तः ।

Time (kāla) I am, the great destroyer of the worlds, and I have come here to destroy all people.

— Bhagavad Gita, Verse 11.32

In the context of the Bhagavad Gita, this verse indicates that the future of the war was already determined by Krishna, who is the embodiment of kala and discloses the future.

Globally, this phrase is famous in a somewhat erroneous form, in that it was misquoted as "I have/am become Death" by J. Robert Oppenheimer, as he reflected on the Manhattan Project's explosion of the first nuclear bomb in 1945.

=== In other cultures ===
In Javanese mythology, Batara Kala is the god of destruction. It is a very huge mighty and powerful god depicted as giant, born of the sperm of Shiva, the kings of gods.

In Borobudur, the gate to the stairs is adorned with a giant head, making the gate look like the open mouth of the giant. Many other gates in Javanese traditional buildings have this kind of ornament. Perhaps the most detailed Kala Face in Java is on the south side of Candi Kalasan.

In Thailand, he is popularly worshipped In the name Phra Kanchaisri together with Lak Mueang within Tai folk religion and Chitragupta in Hinduism. he is regarded as one of the first detiy four teachers of thai folk astrology and thai folk witchcraft., It is a rhyming word in Thai language that says: Phra In Phra Phrom Phra Yom Phra Kan (mean Indra brahma Yama kala) and is worshipped invite as a protector in various rituals of Hinduism in Thailand and Tai folk religion Including being mentioned as a witness to the merit-making ceremony and the water pouring ceremony is a traditional Thai Buddhist ritual style. Thais are also familiar with him by his name Patarakala (ปะตาระกาหลา) from in Thai literature name E - nao adapt from ancient Javanese-influenced literature., His name is also used for statue an ancient deity revered as the guardian deity of Lopburi Province in San Phra Kan and Wat Phra Phutthabat in Saraburi Province., both of which are renowned and well known throughout Thailand.

== Vedanta ==
Within Vedanta, several theories of time are proposed. In Vishishtadvaita Vedanta, for example, time is accepted as an independent substance, distinct from God and matter (prakṛti). Like matter, it is eternal and non-sentient. God is the inner controller of time and shares a body-self relationship with it, as God does with all other things. The manifestations of time that we experience as hours and days are believed to be modifications of one continuous, infinite time (akhanda-kala). According to Vishishtadvaita Vedanta, time is directly perceived with the object that it qualifies.

== Jainism ==
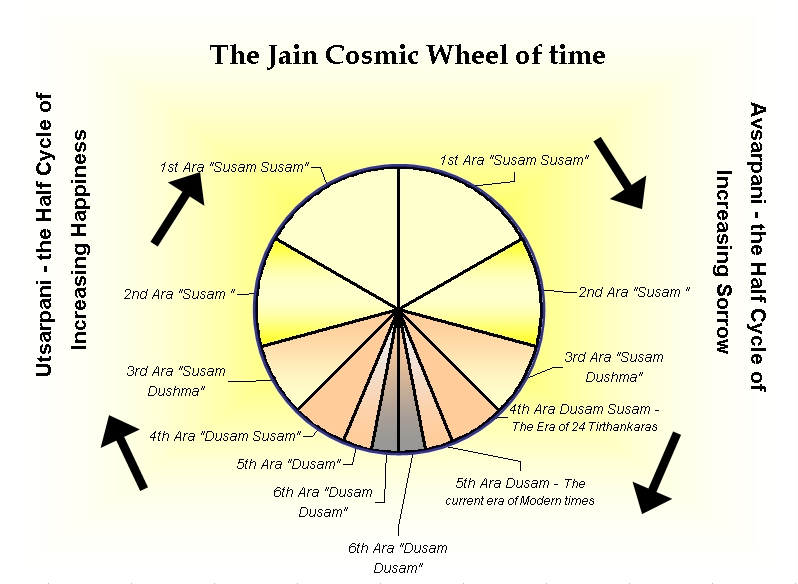
kalachakras in Jainism

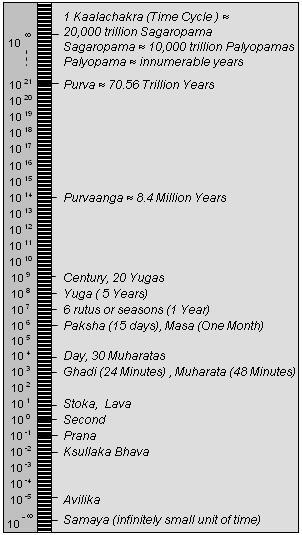
Logarithmic scale of time used in Jain texts.

In Jainism, Kāla (Time) is infinite and is explained in two different ways:

- The measure of duration, known in the form of hours, days, like that.
- The cause of the continuity of function of things.

However Jainism recognizes a very small measurement of time known as samayā which is an infinitely small part of a second. There are cycles (kalachakras) in it. Each cycle having two eras of equal duration described as the avasarpini and the utsarpini.

== See also ==
- Kalachakra
- Kālī
- Mahakala
- Father Time

== Sources ==
- Dalal, Roshen (5 October 2011). Hinduism: An Alphabetical Guide. Penguin Books India. ISBN 978-0-14-341421-6.
- Pintchman, Tracy, ed. (2001), Seeking Mahadevi: Constructing the Identities of the Hindu Great Goddess, SUNY Press
- Soifer, Deborah A. (1991). The Myths of Narasimha and Vamana: Two Avatars in Cosmological Perspective. SUNY Press. ISBN 9780791407998.
