= COVID-19 pandemic in Anhui =

- Disease: COVID-19
- Pathogen: SARS-CoV-2
- Location: Anhui, China
- First outbreak: Wuhan, Hubei
- Arrival date: 2020
- Confirmed cases: 1,021
- Active cases: 12
- Recovered: 1,003
- Deaths: 6

The COVID-19 pandemic reached the province of Anhui, China, in 2020.

== Statistics ==
Division	Active	Confirmed	Deceased	Recovered
Anhui	12	1,021	6	1,003
Hefei	0	176	1	175
Bengbu	0	160	5	155
Fuyang	0	156	0	156
Bozhou	0	108	0	108
Anqing	0	83	0	83
Lu'an	0	77	0	77
Suzhou, Anhui	0	42	0	42
Ma'anshan	2	40	0	38
Wuhu	0	34	0	34
Tongling	2	31	0	29
Huaibei	0	27	0	27
Huainan	0	27	0	27
Chizhou	0	17	0	17
Chuzhou	0	13	0	13
Huangshan	0	9	0	9
Xuancheng	0	6	0	6

== Timeline ==
=== 2020 ===
On January 21, 2020, the Hefei Municipal Health Commission reported that a suspected case of infection with the new coronavirus was found. The patient had been engaged in the operation and management of beef frozen products in Wuhan, and drove back to Anhui from Wuhan on January 17. He had been receiving isolation treatment in a designated hospital, his condition was stable, and close contacts were placed under medical observation. The patient's laboratory test results were reviewed as required.

At 16:00 on January 22, confirmed by the National Health and Health Commission, Anhui Province received the first case of pneumonia infected by a new type of coronavirus reported by Hefei City as a confirmed case. In addition, as of 16:00 on January 22, the Provincial Health and Health Commission received a total of 4 suspected cases of pneumonia caused by new coronavirus infection reported by 2 cities in the province (3 cases in Hefei City and 1 case in Lu'an City).

At 10 o'clock on January 23, Anhui Province reported 8 new confirmed cases of pneumonia caused by a new type of coronavirus infection. Among them, Lu'an City, Chuzhou City, Fuyang City, and Bozhou City reported the first confirmed cases, and Hefei City had 4 new confirmed cases.

On January 24, Anhui Province reported 6 new confirmed cases of pneumonia caused by a new type of coronavirus, including 1 case each in Anqing City, Chizhou City, and Bengbu City, which was the first confirmed case report. 1 newly reported confirmed case.

On January 25, Anhui Province reported 24 new confirmed cases of pneumonia caused by the new coronavirus, including 4 cases in Hefei City, 3 cases in Tongling City, 3 cases in Anqing City, 4 cases in Ma'anshan City, 5 cases in Fuyang City, and 3 cases in Bozhou City. 1 case in Wuhu City, 1 case in Chuzhou City, Tongling City, Maanshan City, and Wuhu City were the first case reports.

Since January 26, all buses in Zongyang County, Tongling City were suspended. On the same day, Anhui Province reported 21 new confirmed cases of pneumonia caused by the new coronavirus, including 3 in Hefei, 3 in Ma'anshan, 3 in Fuyang, 2 in Bozhou, 2 in Wuhu, 2 in Suzhou, 1 in Xuancheng, and 1 in Lu'an. 1 case, 1 case in Huaibei, 1 case in Huainan, 1 case in Anqing, and 1 case in Huangshan. Suzhou City, Xuancheng City, Huaibei City, Huainan City, and Huangshan City were the first case reports.
