= List of Prefectures in Anhui Province by GDP =

This is a list of prefectures, including prefecture-level cities and prefectures, of Anhui, China by gross domestic product (GDP).

== 2017 List ==
List of Prefectures in Anhui Province by GDP & GDP per capita in 2017 (GDP in million; US$1 = 6.7518 CNY)
Prefectues	GDP								GDP per capita			Population	GDP of Anhui Prefectures in 2017 GDP per capita of Anhui Prefectures in 2017
Prefectues	rank of GDP	GDP (USD)				GDP (CNY)	Percentage in the Provincial GDP (%)	Growth (GDP/%)	rank of GDP per capita	GDP per capita (USD)	GDP per capita (CNY)	Population	GDP of Anhui Prefectures in 2017 GDP per capita of Anhui Prefectures in 2017
Prefectues	rank of GDP	Gross	Primary Industry	Secondary Industry	Tertiary Industry	GDP (CNY)	Percentage in the Provincial GDP (%)	Growth (GDP/%)	rank of GDP per capita	GDP per capita (USD)	GDP per capita (CNY)	Population	GDP of Anhui Prefectures in 2017 GDP per capita of Anhui Prefectures in 2017
Anhui Province	13th among the provinces	407,576	38,682	199,748	169,146	2,751,870	100	8.5	24th among the provinces▲	6547	44206	62,548,000	GDP of Anhui Prefectures in 2017 GDP per capita of Anhui Prefectures in 2017
Hefei	1	106,837	4,040	53,957	48,840	721,345	25.7	8.5	1	13506	91113	7,965,000	GDP of Anhui Prefectures in 2017 GDP per capita of Anhui Prefectures in 2017
Wuhu	2	45,403	1,921	25,421	18,062	306,552	10.9	8.9	2	12328	83234	3,696,000	GDP of Anhui Prefectures in 2017 GDP per capita of Anhui Prefectures in 2017
Ma'anshan	3▲	25,742	1,262	14,654	9,827	173,808	6.2	8.7	3	11183	75503	2,302,000	GDP of Anhui Prefectures in 2017 GDP per capita of Anhui Prefectures in 2017
Anqing	4▼	25,305	2,869	12,271	10,166	170,855	6.1	8.2	11	5468	36922	4,643,000	GDP of Anhui Prefectures in 2017 GDP per capita of Anhui Prefectures in 2017
Chuzhou	5	23,812	3,359	12,133	8,319	160,771	5.7	9.0	10	5865	39599	4,076,000	GDP of Anhui Prefectures in 2017 GDP per capita of Anhui Prefectures in 2017
Fuyang	6	23,270	4,602	9,439	9,230	157,112	5.6	9.0	16	2893	19536	8,093,000	GDP of Anhui Prefectures in 2017 GDP per capita of Anhui Prefectures in 2017
Bengbu	7	22,967	3,041	10,091	9,834	155,066	5.5	9.1	6▼	6847	46233	3,377,000	GDP of Anhui Prefectures in 2017 GDP per capita of Anhui Prefectures in 2017
Suzhou	8	22,274	3,829	8,527	9,919	150,391	5.4	9.1	13	4222	26722	5,657,000	GDP of Anhui Prefectures in 2017 GDP per capita of Anhui Prefectures in 2017
Lu'an	9	18,051	2,823	8,054	7,174	121,875	4.3	7.9	14	3771	25465	4,800,000	GDP of Anhui Prefectures in 2017 GDP per capita of Anhui Prefectures in 2017
Xuancheng	10	17,605	1,940	8,464	7,200	118,866	4.2	8.5	7▲	6751	45582	2,614,000	GDP of Anhui Prefectures in 2017 GDP per capita of Anhui Prefectures in 2017
Bozhou	11	17,536	3,107	7,025	7,404	118,399	4.2	9.2	15	3414	23051	5,169,000	GDP of Anhui Prefectures in 2017 GDP per capita of Anhui Prefectures in 2017
Tongling	12▲	17,238	727	10,859	5,650	116,388	4.1	8.2	4	10744	72539	1,608,000	GDP of Anhui Prefectures in 2017 GDP per capita of Anhui Prefectures in 2017
Huainan	13▼	16,462	1,795	8,189	6,477	111,148	4.0	6.9	12	4742	32017	3,487,000	GDP of Anhui Prefectures in 2017 GDP per capita of Anhui Prefectures in 2017
Huaibei	14	13,759	948	8,106	4,705	92,901	3.3	7.6	9	6204	41885	2,228,000	GDP of Anhui Prefectures in 2017 GDP per capita of Anhui Prefectures in 2017
Chizhou	15	9,689	1,077	4,403	4,208	65,415	2.3	5.5	8▼	6700	45238	1,449,000	GDP of Anhui Prefectures in 2017 GDP per capita of Anhui Prefectures in 2017
Huangshan	16	9,564	849	3,795	4,920	64,575	2.3	7.8	5▲	6923	46742	1,384,000	GDP of Anhui Prefectures in 2017 GDP per capita of Anhui Prefectures in 2017

== Historical Data ==
=== 2016 List ===
2016 List

List of Prefectures in Anhui Province by GDP & GDP per capita in 2016 (GDP in million; US$1 = 6.6423 CNY)
Prefectues	GDP								GDP per capita			Population	GDP of Anhui Prefectures in 2016 GDP per capita of Anhui Prefectures in 2016
Prefectues	rank of GDP	GDP (USD)				GDP (CNY)	Percentage in the Provincial GDP (%)	Growth (GDP/%)	rank of GDP per capita	GDP per capita (USD)	GDP per capita (CNY)	Population	GDP of Anhui Prefectures in 2016 GDP per capita of Anhui Prefectures in 2016
Prefectues	rank of GDP	Gross	Primary Industry	Secondary Industry	Tertiary Industry	GDP (CNY)	Percentage in the Provincial GDP (%)	Growth (GDP/%)	rank of GDP per capita	GDP per capita (USD)	GDP per capita (CNY)	Population	GDP of Anhui Prefectures in 2016 GDP per capita of Anhui Prefectures in 2016
Anhui Province	13th among the provinces▲	350,398	38,657	174,492	149,947	2,411,790	100	8.68	25th among the provinces	5,680	39,092	61,955,000	GDP of Anhui Prefectures in 2016 GDP per capita of Anhui Prefectures in 2016
Hefei	1	91,157	4,067	47,894	42,500	627,430	26.01	9.8	1	11,702	80,543	7,790,000	GDP of Anhui Prefectures in 2016 GDP per capita of Anhui Prefectures in 2016
Wuhu	2	39,218	1,910	22,678	16,052	269,940	11.19	9.7	2	10,733	73,875	3,654,000	GDP of Anhui Prefectures in 2016 GDP per capita of Anhui Prefectures in 2016
Ma'anshan	3	22,246	2,893	10,948	9,211	153,120	6.35	8.0	11	4,582	33,396	4,586,000	GDP of Anhui Prefectures in 2016 GDP per capita of Anhui Prefectures in 2016
Anqing	4	21,703	1,261	12,458	8,769	149,380	6.19	9.0	3	9,595	66,039	2,262,000	GDP of Anhui Prefectures in 2016 GDP per capita of Anhui Prefectures in 2016
Chuzhou	5	20,671	3,395	10,647	7,378	142,280	5.93	9.2	10	5,146	35,419	4,017,000	GDP of Anhui Prefectures in 2016 GDP per capita of Anhui Prefectures in 2016
Fuyang	6	20,368	4,552	8,397	8,156	140,190	5.81	9.0	16	2,578	17,743	7,901,000	GDP of Anhui Prefectures in 2016 GDP per capita of Anhui Prefectures in 2016
Bengbu	7	20,134	3,011	9,170	8,682	138,580	5.75	9.4	5▲	6,118	42,109	3,291,000	GDP of Anhui Prefectures in 2016 GDP per capita of Anhui Prefectures in 2016
Suzhou	8	19,640	3,917	7,721	8,714	135,180	5.60	9.1	13	3,544	24,396	5,541,000	GDP of Anhui Prefectures in 2016 GDP per capita of Anhui Prefectures in 2016
Lu'an	9	16,099	2,851	7,386	6,446	110,810	4.59	7.2	14	3,396	23,373	4,741,000	GDP of Anhui Prefectures in 2016 GDP per capita of Anhui Prefectures in 2016
Xuancheng	10	15,368	1,921	7,560	6,445	105,780	4.39	8.7	8	5,929	40,810	2,592,000	GDP of Anhui Prefectures in 2016 GDP per capita of Anhui Prefectures in 2016
Bozhou	11	15,198	3,104	6,096	6,549	104,610	4.34	8.9	15	3,011	20,727	5,047,000	GDP of Anhui Prefectures in 2016 GDP per capita of Anhui Prefectures in 2016
Huainan	12▲	14,002	1,783	6,844	5,884	96,380	4.00	6.6	12	4,081	28,091	3,456,000	GDP of Anhui Prefectures in 2016 GDP per capita of Anhui Prefectures in 2016
Tongling	13▼	13,908	737	8,575	5,099	95,730	3.97	9.1	4	8,736	60,131	1,592,000	GDP of Anhui Prefectures in 2016 GDP per capita of Anhui Prefectures in 2016
Huaibei	14	11,608	927	6,778	4,325	79,900	3.31	5.0	9	5,327	36,668	2,179,000	GDP of Anhui Prefectures in 2016 GDP per capita of Anhui Prefectures in 2016
Chizhou	15	8,557	1,071	3,882	3,915	58,900	2.44	8.1	7	5,959	41,016	1,436,000	GDP of Anhui Prefectures in 2016 GDP per capita of Anhui Prefectures in 2016
Huangshan	16	8,380	849	3,376	4,459	57,680	2.39	7.8	6▼	6,099	41,980	1,374,000	GDP of Anhui Prefectures in 2016 GDP per capita of Anhui Prefectures in 2016

=== 2015 List ===
2015 List

List of Prefectures in Anhui Province by GDP & GDP per capita in 2015 (GDP in million; US$1 = 6.2284 CNY)
Prefectues	GDP								GDP per capita			Population	GDP of Anhui Prefectures in 2015 GDP per capita of Anhui Prefectures in 2015
Prefectues	rank of GDP	GDP (USD)				GDP (CNY)	Percentage in the Provincial GDP (%)	Growth (GDP/%)	rank of GDP per capita	GDP per capita (USD)	GDP per capita (CNY)	Population	GDP of Anhui Prefectures in 2015 GDP per capita of Anhui Prefectures in 2015
Prefectues	rank of GDP	Gross	Primary Industry	Secondary Industry	Tertiary Industry	GDP (CNY)	Percentage in the Provincial GDP (%)	Growth (GDP/%)	rank of GDP per capita	GDP per capita (USD)	GDP per capita (CNY)	Population	GDP of Anhui Prefectures in 2015 GDP per capita of Anhui Prefectures in 2015
Anhui Province	14th among the provinces	3,533.11	39,443	175,757	138,111	22,005.63	100	8.73	25th among the provinces	5,779	35,997	61,436,100	GDP of Anhui Prefectures in 2015 GDP per capita of Anhui Prefectures in 2015
Hefei	1	908.78	4,229	47,802	38,847	5,660.27	25.11	10.5	1▲	11,737	73,102	7,789,500	GDP of Anhui Prefectures in 2015 GDP per capita of Anhui Prefectures in 2015
Wuhu	2	394.54	1,927	22,565	14,962	2,457.32	10.90	4.4	2▲	10,852	67,592	3,654,500	GDP of Anhui Prefectures in 2015 GDP per capita of Anhui Prefectures in 2015
Anqing	3	227.57	2,985	11,011	8,762	1,417.43	6.29	9.1	11▲	4,993	31,101	4,586,100	GDP of Anhui Prefectures in 2015 GDP per capita of Anhui Prefectures in 2015
Ma'anshan	4	219.21	1,276	12,421	8,224	1,365.30	6.06	8.9	3▲	9,762	60,802	2,262,200	GDP of Anhui Prefectures in 2015 GDP per capita of Anhui Prefectures in 2015
Chuzhou	5	209.64	3,557	10,549	6,858	1,305.70	5.79	10.2	10▲	5,240	32,634	4,017,100	GDP of Anhui Prefectures in 2015 GDP per capita of Anhui Prefectures in 2015
Fuyang	6	203.50	4,596	8,291	7,462	1,267.45	5.62	9.5	16	2,588	16,121	7,901,500	GDP of Anhui Prefectures in 2015 GDP per capita of Anhui Prefectures in 2015
Bengbu	7	201.18	3,027	9,649	7,442	1,253.06	5.56	3.7	6▲	6,144	38,267	3,291,400	GDP of Anhui Prefectures in 2015 GDP per capita of Anhui Prefectures in 2015
Suzhou	8	198.42	4,307	7,528	8,007	1,235.83	5.48	9.9	13	3,599	22,415	5,541,200	GDP of Anhui Prefectures in 2015 GDP per capita of Anhui Prefectures in 2015
Lu'an	9	163.20	2,897	7,520	5,903	1,016.49	4.51	6.9	14	3,456	21,524	4,741,200	GDP of Anhui Prefectures in 2015 GDP per capita of Anhui Prefectures in 2015
Xuancheng	10	155.97	1,948	7,600	6,050	971.46	4.31	9.2	8▼	6,038	37,610	2,592,400	GDP of Anhui Prefectures in 2015 GDP per capita of Anhui Prefectures in 2015
Bozhou	11	151.34	3,131	5,943	6,059	942.61	4.18	10.3	15	3,014	18,771	5,046,900	GDP of Anhui Prefectures in 2015 GDP per capita of Anhui Prefectures in 2015
Tongling	12▲	146.36	758	9,038	4,840	911.60	4.04	8.2	4▼	9,214	57,387	1,592,200	GDP of Anhui Prefectures in 2015 GDP per capita of Anhui Prefectures in 2015
Huainan	13▼	144.67	1,790	6,957	5,720	901.08	4.00	9.4	12▼	4,238	26,398	3,431,100	GDP of Anhui Prefectures in 2015 GDP per capita of Anhui Prefectures in 2015
Huaibei	14▼	122.08	953	7,090	4,166	760.39	3.37	8.5	9	5,629	35,057	2,178,800	GDP of Anhui Prefectures in 2015 GDP per capita of Anhui Prefectures in 2015
Chizhou	15	87.46	1,133	4,035	3,578	544.74	2.42	7.4	7▼	6,103	38,014	1,436,300	GDP of Anhui Prefectures in 2015 GDP per capita of Anhui Prefectures in 2015
Huangshan	16	85.24	885	3,400	4,239	530.90	2.36	6.1	5	6,229	38,794	1,373,700	GDP of Anhui Prefectures in 2015 GDP per capita of Anhui Prefectures in 2015
