= Nanli =

Nanli may refer to:

- Nanli Subdistrict, Huaibei, Anhui, China
- Nanli Township, Qin County, Shanxi, China
- Nho Quế River, a river of Vietnam and China, known in China as Nanli River (南利河)
