= Phra Kanchaisri =

Phra Kalachai Si
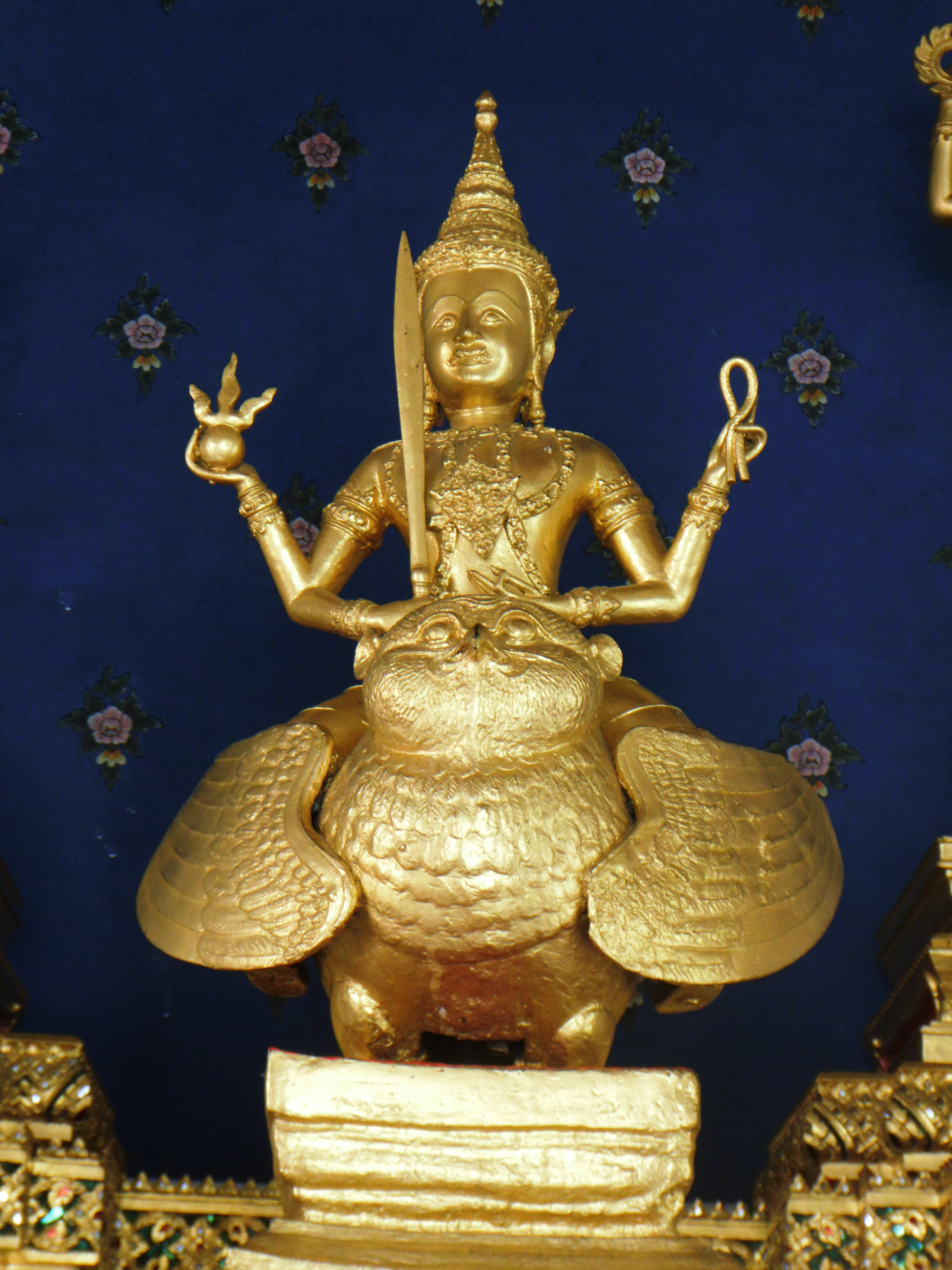
- Phra Kalachai Si at the Bangkok City Pillar Shrine
- Devanagari: काल
- Sanskrit transliteration: kāla
- Mount: Owl (in Thai Brahmanism)
- Consort: Kali

Phra Kanchaisri or simply Phra Kal (พระกาฬ) is a deity whose worship originated from ancient Indian traditions. He is traditionally venerated as a pair alongside Kali, originally called Phra Kal Phra Kuli or Phra Kal Kuli (พระกาลพระกุลี / พระกาลกุลี). Over time, the name evolved—"Kuli" became distorted and was later shortened to "Kli" (กลี), which sounded frightening to ears during the Rattanakosin period (Bangkok era). Therefore, to make the name more auspicious and appropriate for official use—especially around the reign of King Rama IV—the suffix was changed to Chai Si (ชัยศรี). This modification can be seen in royal decrees such as the water oath declaration. However, among the general public, the deity continued to be referred to simply as Phra Kal.

Despite the linguistic evolution, the worship of Phra Kal has persisted in Thai popular belief and has merged with local animist traditions, represented in figures such as Ta Kala and Yai Kali (ตากะลายายกะลี), regional spiritual deities.

A revered image of Phra Kanchaisri is housed inside the Bangkok City Pillar Shrine (ศาลหลักเมือง).

== In Thailand ==
In Thailand, he is popularly worshipped In the name Phra Kanchaisri together with Lak Mueang within Tai folk religion and Chitragupta in Hinduism. he is regarded as one of the first detiy four teachers of thai folk astrology and thai folk witchcraft. , It is a rhyming word in Thai language that says: Phra In Phra Phrom Phra Yom Phra Kan ( mean Indra brahma Yama kala ) and is worshipped invite as a protector in various rituals of Hinduism in Thailand and Tai folk religion Including being mentioned as a witness to the merit-making ceremony and the water pouring ceremony is a traditional Thai Buddhist ritual style.Thais are also familiar with him by his name Patarakala (ปะตาระกาหลา) from in Thai literature name E - nao adapt from ancient Javanese-influenced literature. , His name is also used for statue an ancient deity revered as the guardian deity of Lopburi Province in San Phra Kan and Wat Phra Phutthabat in Saraburi Province., both of which are renowned and well-known throughout Thailand.

== See also ==
- Mahakala
- Kāla
