= Xiangshan, Huaibei =

Coordinates: 33°58′31″N 116°48′43″E

Xiangshan 相山区
- District
- Interactive map of Xiangshan
- Country: China
- Province: Anhui
- Prefecture-level city: Huaibei

Area
  - Total: 141.7 km^{2} (54.7 sq mi)

Population (2020)
  - Total: 436,136
  - Density: 3,078/km^{2} (7,972/sq mi)
- Time zone: UTC+8 (China Standard)
- Postal code: 235000

Xiangshan District (simplified Chinese: 相山区; traditional Chinese: 相山區; pinyin: Xiàngshān Qū) is a district of the city of Huaibei, Anhui Province, China.

== Administrative divisions ==
Xiangshan District has 8 subdistricts and 1 town.

8 Subdistricts

- Xiangnan (相南街道)
- Xiangshandong (相山东街道)
- Xiangshanxi (相山西街道)
- Sandikou (三堤口街道)
- Dongshan (东山街道)
- Renxu (任圩街道)
- Nanli (南黎街道)
- Quyang (曲阳街道)

1 Town

- Qugou (渠沟镇)
