= Duji, Huaibei =

Coordinates: 33.9939°N 116.829°E

Duji 杜集区
- District
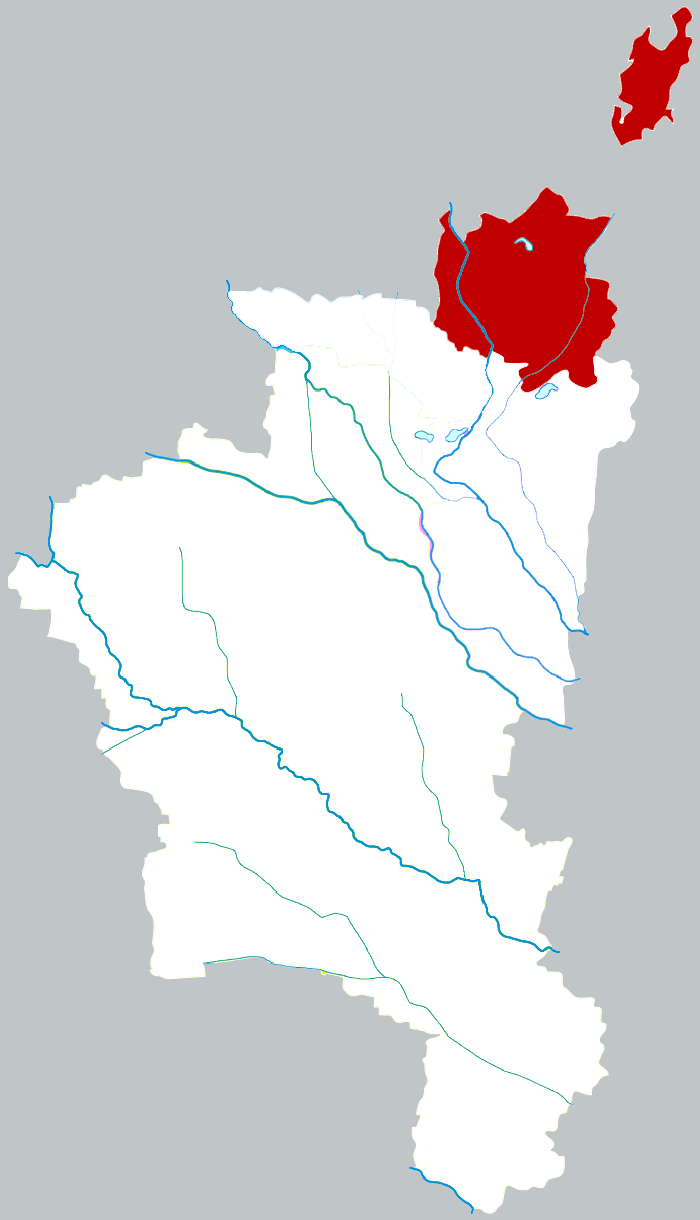
- Location of Duji district in Huaibei city, China
- Interactive map of Duji
- Country: China
- Province: Anhui
- Prefecture-level city: Huaibei

Area
  - Total: 230.2 km^{2} (88.9 sq mi)

Population (2020)
  - Total: 239,692
  - Density: 1,041/km^{2} (2,697/sq mi)
- Time zone: UTC+8 (China Standard)
- Postal code: 235000

Duji (Chinese: 杜集; pinyin: Dùjí) is a district of the city of Huaibei, Anhui Province, China.

== Administrative divisions ==
Nowadays, Duji District is divided to 2 subdistricts and 3 towns.

2 Subdistricts

- Gaoyue (高岳街道)
- Kuangshanji (矿山集街道)

3 Towns

- Duanyuan (段园镇)
- Shuoli (朔里镇)
- Shitai (石台镇)
