= Mahakala =

God in Hinduism and Tantric Buddhism

- God of Time, Maya, Creation, Destruction and Power
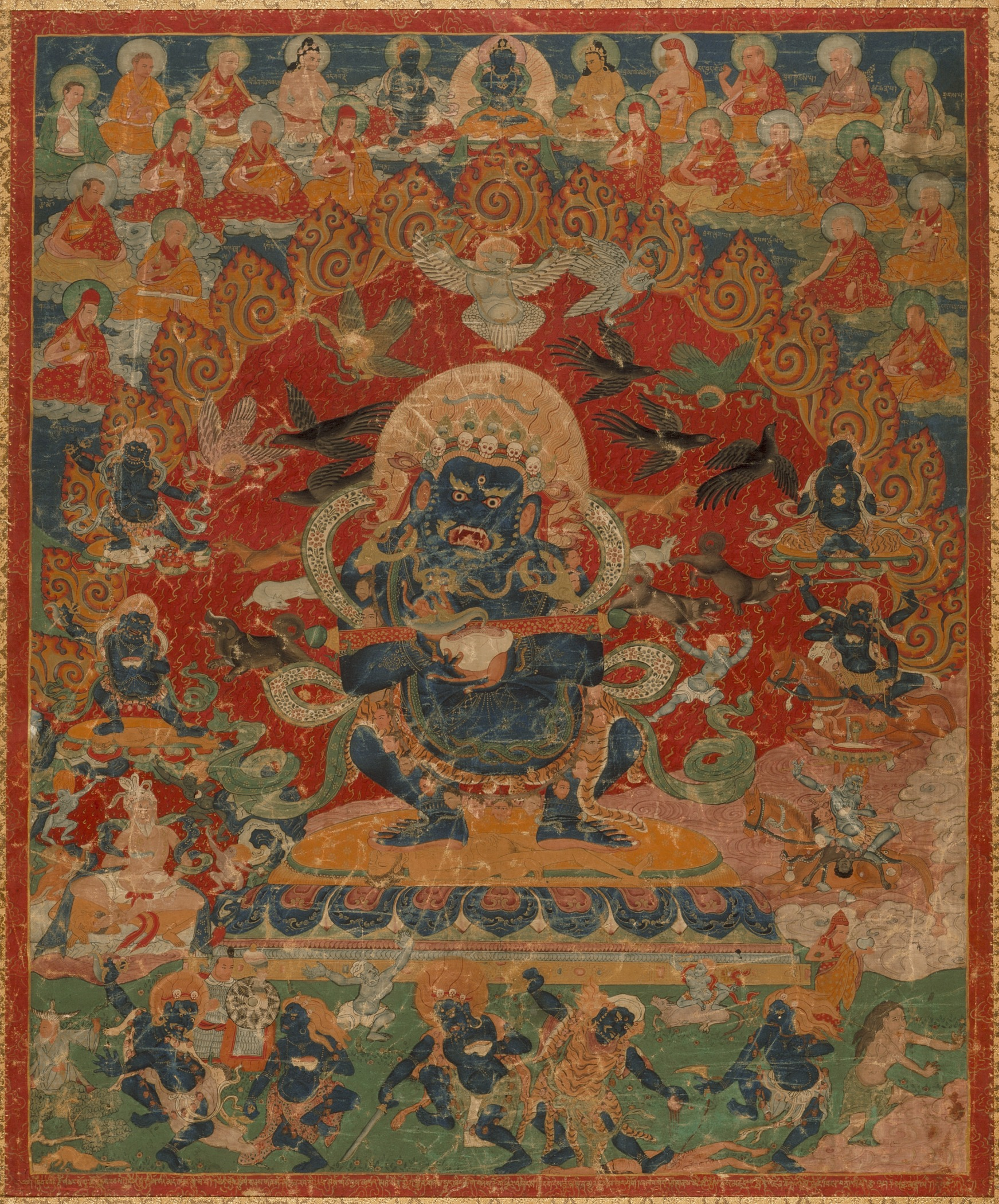
- Mahākāla and companions
- Abode: Śmaśāna (but varies by interpretation)
- Weapon: Khanda, Trishula, Hammer (in Japanese depictions)
- Consort: Parvati as Mahakali

Mahākāla (Sanskrit: महाकाल, pronounced [mɐɦaːˈkaːlɐ]) is a deity common to Hinduism and Buddhism.

In Buddhism, Mahākāla is regarded as a Dharmapāla ("Protector of the Dharma") and a wrathful manifestation of a Buddha, while in Hinduism, Mahākāla is a fierce manifestation of the Hindu god Shiva and the consort of the goddess Mahākālī; he most prominently appears in the Kalikula sect of Shaktism.

Mahākāla appears as a protector deity in the various traditions of Vajrayana Buddhism, like Chinese Esoteric Buddhism, Shingon, and Tibetan Buddhism. He is known as Dàhēitiān and Daaih'hāktīn (大黑天) in Mandarin and Cantonese, Daeheukcheon (대흑천) in Korean, Đại Hắc Thiên in Vietnamese, and Daikokuten (大黒天) in Japanese.

== Etymology ==
Mahākāla is a Sanskrit bahuvrihi of mahā "great" and kāla "time/death", which means "beyond time" or death.

Tibetan: ནག་པོ་ཆེན་པོ།, THL: nak po chen po means "Great Black One". Tibetan: མགོན་པོ།, THL: gön po "Protector" is also used to refer specifically to Mahākāla.

== Description ==
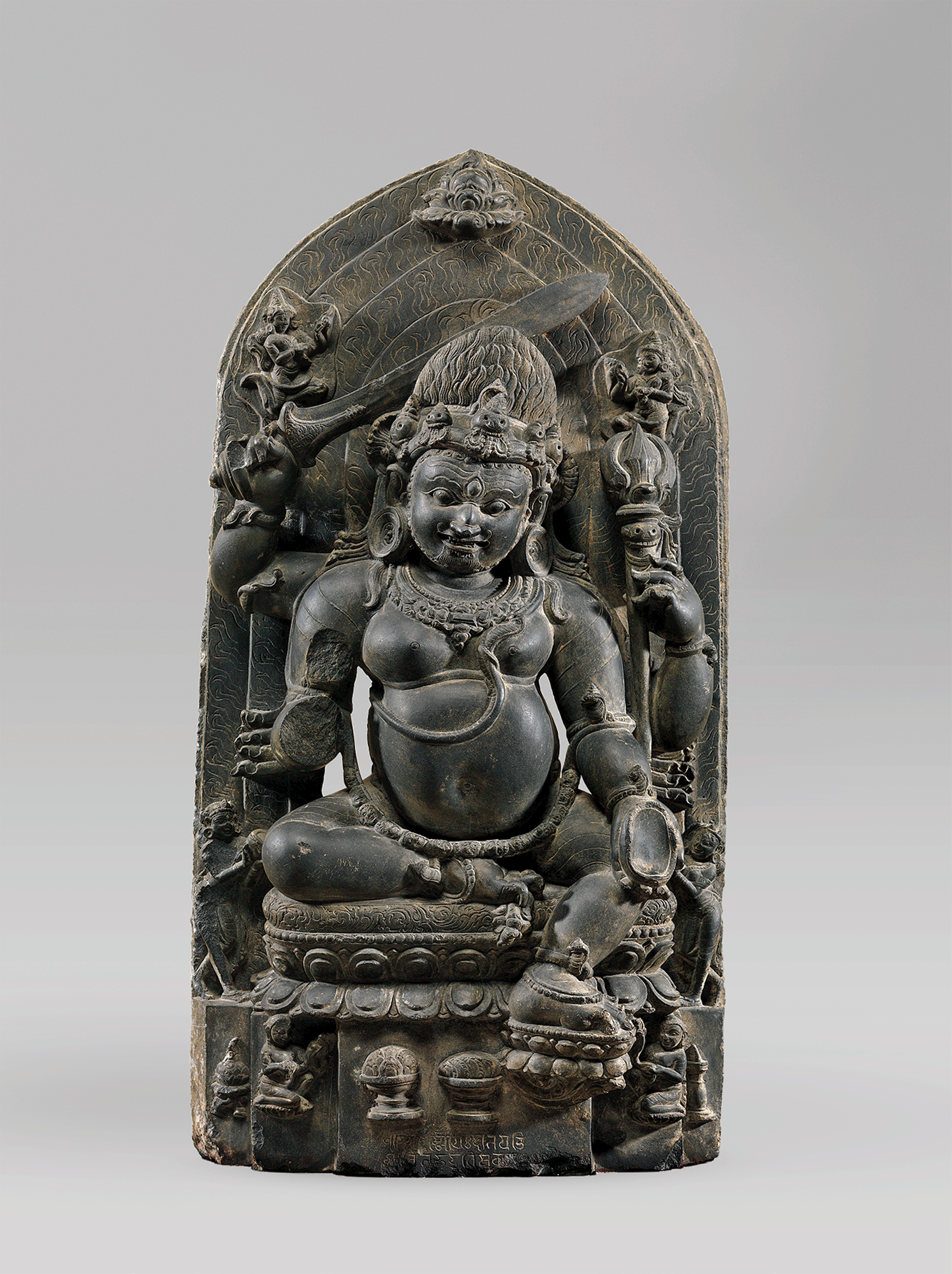
Indian Buddhist Mahakala, 11th–12th century, Bihar

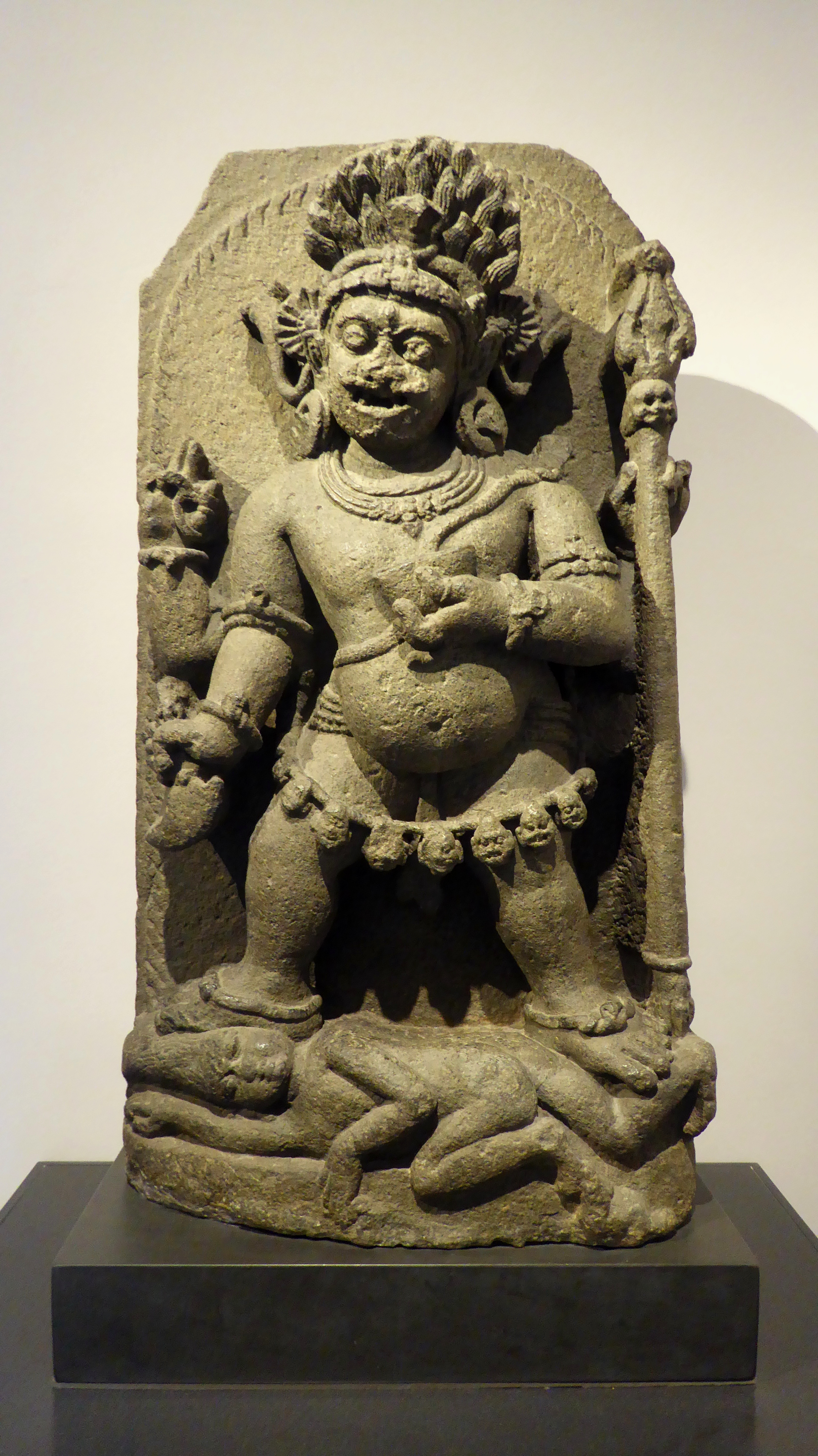
A basalt statue of Mahākāla from Odisha, India, dated to the Pala period (1100–1200 CE). Victoria and Albert Museum, London.

According to Shaktisamgama Tantra, the spouse of Mahākālī is extremely frightening. Mahākāla has four arms, three eyes and is of the brilliance of 10 million black fires of dissolution, dwells in the midst of eight cremation grounds (śmaśāna). He is adorned with eight human skulls, seated on five corpses, holds a trident (triśūla), a drum, a sword, and a scythe in his hands. He is adorned with ashes from the cremation ground and surrounded by numbers of loudly shrieking vultures and jackals. At his side is his consort, symbolized as Kālī.

Both Mahākāla and Kālī represent the ultimate destructive power of Brahman and they are not bounded by any rules or regulations. They have the power to dissolve even time and space into themselves, and exist as the Void at the dissolution of the universe. They are responsible for the dissolution of the universe at the end of each kalpa. They are also responsible for annihilating great evils and great demons when other gods, devas, and even Trimurtis fail to do so. Mahākāla and Kālī annihilate men, women, children, animals, the world, and the entire universe without mercy because they are Kala or Time in the personified form, and Time is not bound by anything, and Time does not show mercy, nor does it wait for anything or anyone. In some parts of Odisha, Jharkhand, and Dooars (that is, in eastern Bengal), wild elephants are worshiped as manifestations of Mahākāla.

Mahākāla is typically depicted blue or black in colour. Just as all colours are absorbed and dissolved into black, all names and forms are said to melt into those of Mahākāla, symbolising his all-embracing, comprehensive nature. Black can also represent the total absence of colour, and again in this case it signifies the nature of Mahākāla as ultimate or absolute reality. This principle is known in Sanskrit as nirguna, beyond all quality and form, and it is typified by both interpretations.

== In Hinduism ==
Mahakala is also known as Mahakala Bhairava in Hinduism, often depicted with four arms and three eyes, he is associated with time, creation, destruction, and power. Many temples in India and Nepal are dedicated solely for Mahakala Bhairava, for example at the temple in Ujjain, which is mentioned more than once by Kālidāsa. The primary temple, place of worship for Mahakala is Ujjain. Mahakala is also a name of one of Shiva's principal attendants (Sanskrit: gaṇa), along with Nandi, Shiva's mount and so is often represented outside the main doorway of early Hindu temples.

== In Buddhism ==
Numerous traditions of Mahayana Buddhism rely on Mahākāla as a guardian deity (Dharmapala, "dharma protector"). Mahākāla is one of the most popular protector deities in Tibetan Buddhism and he is also sometimes used as a meditational deity (yidam) in tantric Buddhist yogas. He is depicted in a number of variations, each with distinctly different qualities and aspects. He is generally depicted as a wrathful deity.

Mahākāla is commonly regarded as the emanation of different beings in different cases, such as Hevajra, Vajradhara, Amitabha, and Avalokiteshvara or Akshobhya Buddha. Different tantric cycles, like Guhyasamaja and Chakrasamvara, each contain Mahakala as an emanation of their central Buddha deity.

Mahākāla is almost always depicted with a crown of five skulls, which represent the transmutation of the five kleśās (negative afflictions) into the five wisdoms. He also wears a garland consisting of fifty severed heads, the number fifty is in reference to the number of letters in the Sanskrit alphabet and is symbolic of the pure speech of Buddha.

Mahākāla is also an important deity in East Asian Buddhism, where he is generally known as a protector figure. In Japanese Buddhism, Mahākāla transformed into a more friendly wealth and luck deity, known as Daikokuten.

In a Mantrayana text translated during the Tang Dynasty, the mantra of Mahākāla appears as:

Oṃ Mahākālāya svāhā.

The same mantra also appears in a Tibetan text from Dunhuang. This mantra (or rather, its Sino-Japanese form: On Makakyaraya sowaka), is the main mantra of this deity in Japanese Esoteric Buddhism.

=== Tibetan Buddhism depictions ===
==== Two-armed forms ====
The two-armed "Black-Cloaked Mahakala" (Wylie: mgon po ber nag chen) is a protector of the Karma Kagyu school clad in the cloak of a māntrika "warlock". His imagery derives from terma of the Nyingma school and was adopted by the Karma Kagyu during the time of Karma Pakshi, 2nd Karmapa Lama. He is often depicted with his consort, Rangjung Gyalmo. He is often thought to be the primary protector, but he is in fact the main protector of the Karmapas specifically. Four-Armed Mahakala is technically the primary protector. Six-Armed Mahakala (Wylie: mgon po phyag drug pa) is also a common dharmapala in the Kagyu school.

Pañjaranātha Mahakala "Mahakala, Lord of the Tent", an emanation of Mañjuśrī, is a protector of the Sakya school.

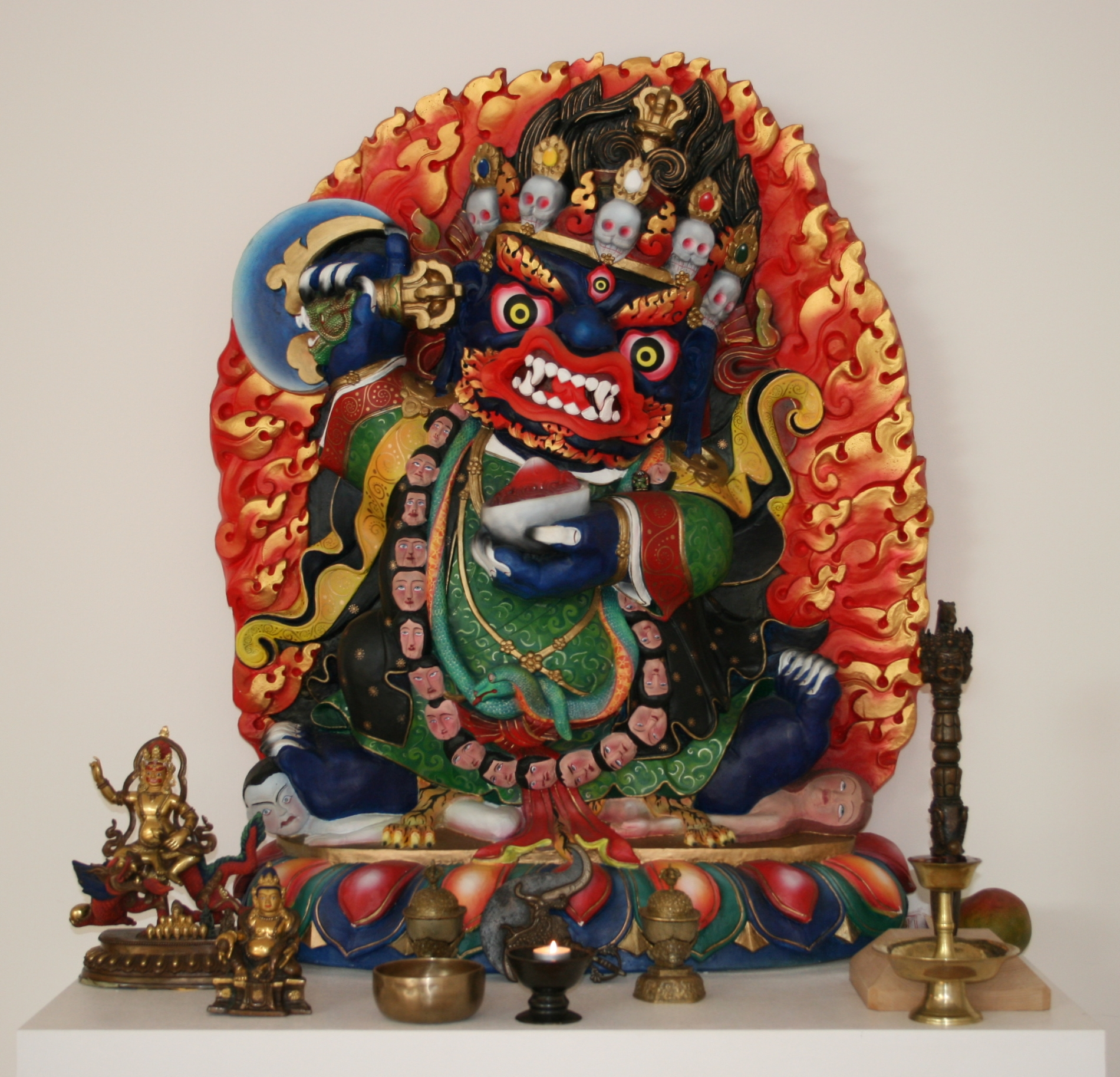
Mahakala Bernagchen (Black-Cloaked Mahākāla)

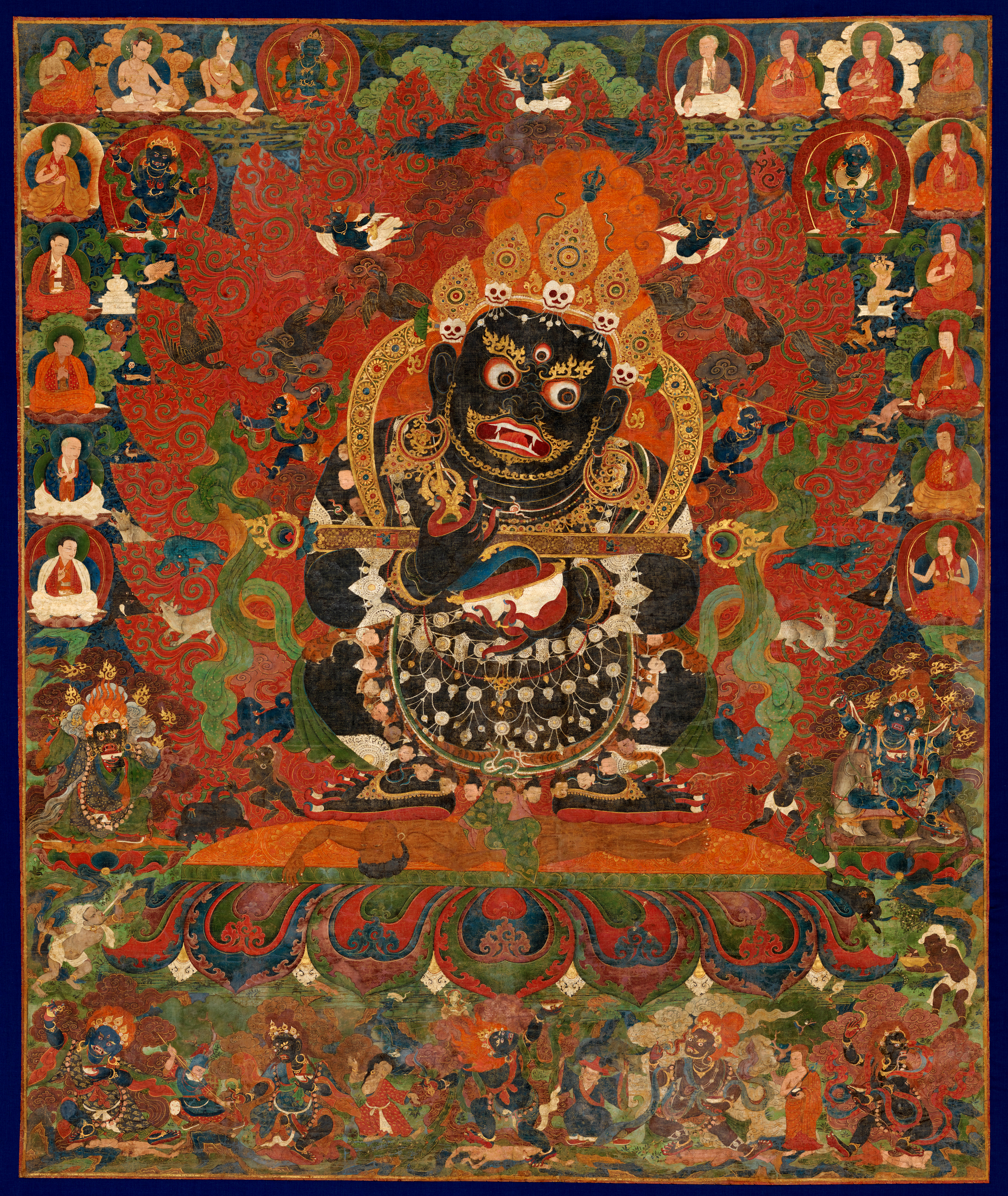
Pañjaranātha Mahakala "Protector of the Tent", Central Tibet, circa 1500.

==== Four-armed forms ====
There are various Four-Armed Mahakalas (Skt. Chaturbhūjamahākāla, Wylie: mgon po phyag bzhi pa, "The Great Black Vajra Lord with Four Hands"), one popular depiction comes from the Arya linegae of Guhyasamaja.

These are the primary protectors of the Karma Kagyu, Drikung Kagyu, Drukpa Lineage and the Nyingma of Tibetan Buddhism. A four-armed Mahakala is also found in the Nyingma school, although the primary protector of the Dzogchen (Skt: Mahasandhi) teachings is Ekajati.

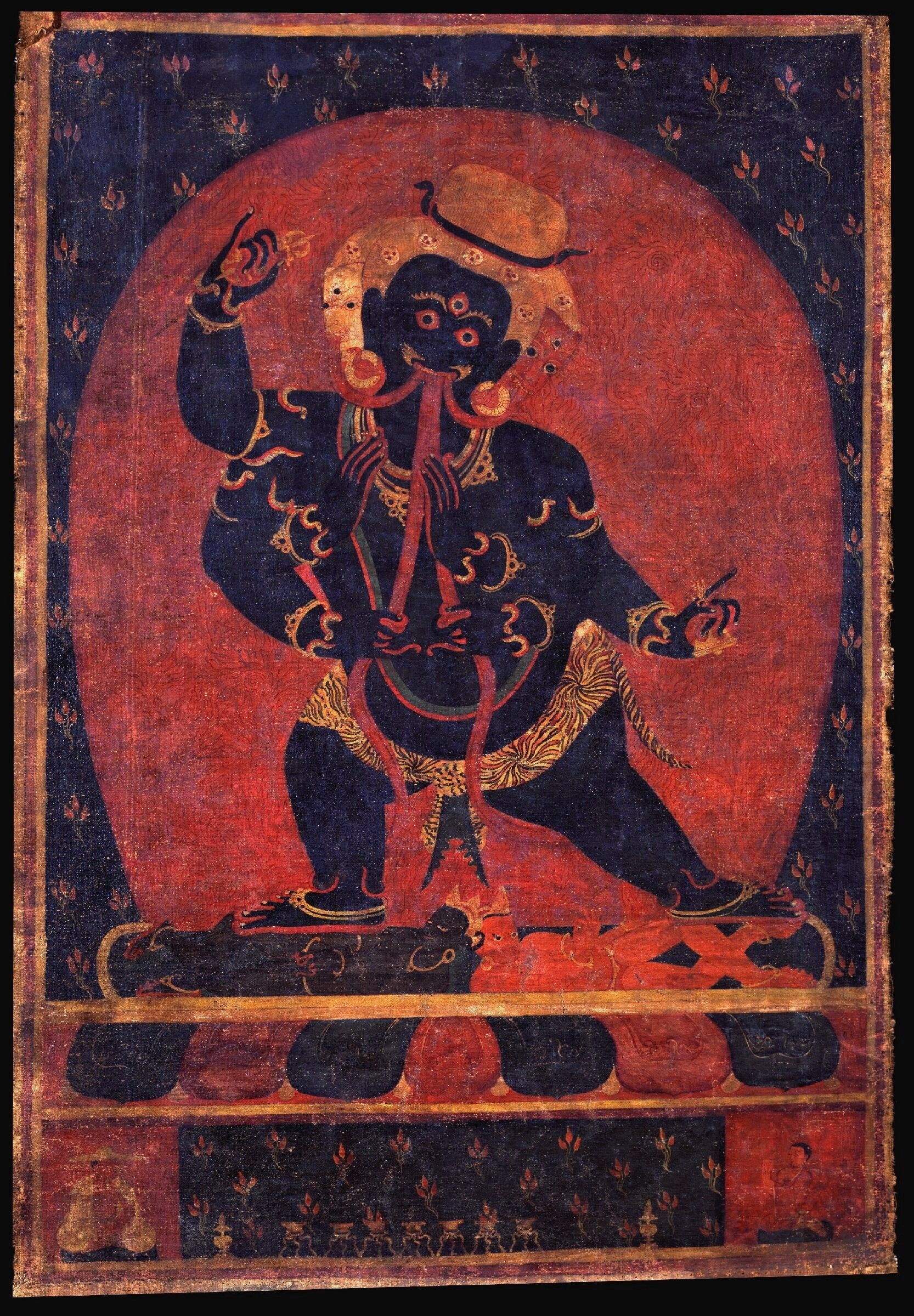
Mahakala, 12th century, Rubin Museum of Art

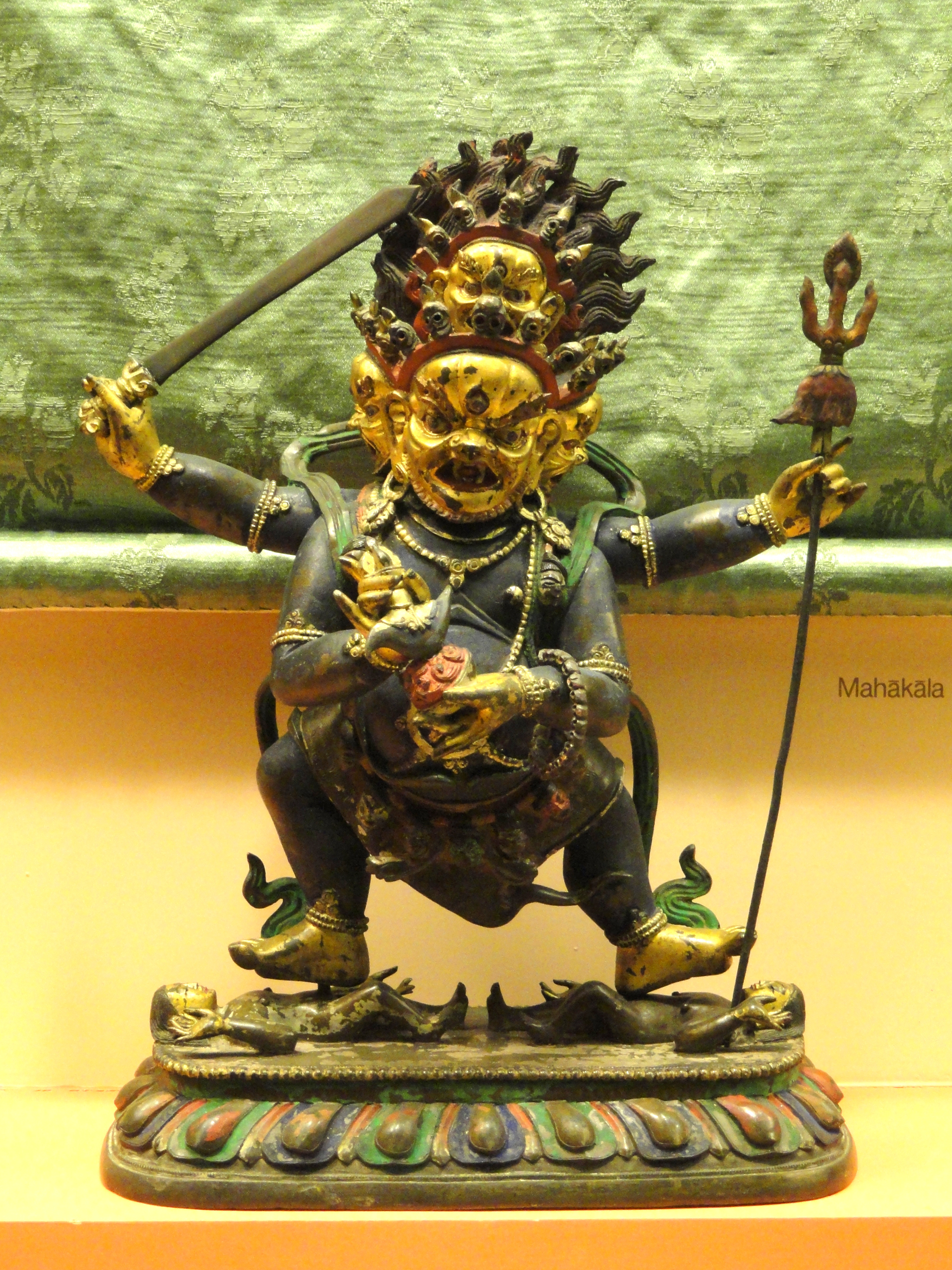
Exhibit in the Asian collection of the American Museum of Natural History, Manhattan, New York City, New York, USA.

==== Six-armed forms ====
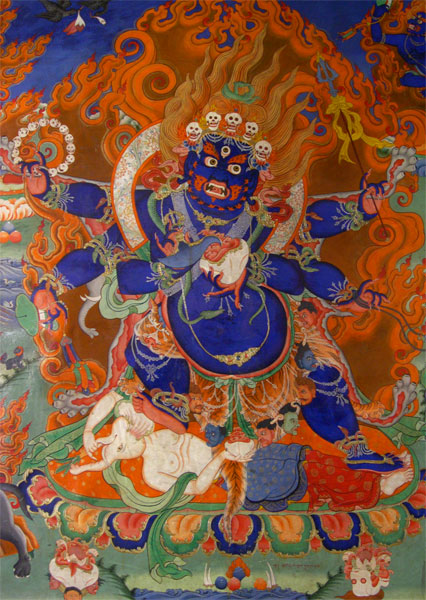
Six-Armed Mahakala, Likir Gompa, Ladakh

Nyingshuk came from Khyungpo Nenjor, the founder of the Shangpa Kagyu, and spread to all the lineages (Sakya, Nyingma, and Gelug) and to the Kagyu lineages. There are also terma lineages of various forms of Six-Armed Mahakala. Nyinghsuk, though derived from the Shangpa, is not the major Shangpa one; it is in a dancing posture rather than upright, and is a very advanced Mahakala practice.

The White Six-Armed Mahakala (Skt: Ṣadbhūjasītamahākāla; Wylie: mgon po yid bzhin nor bu) is popular among Mongolian Gelugpas.

==== Other forms ====
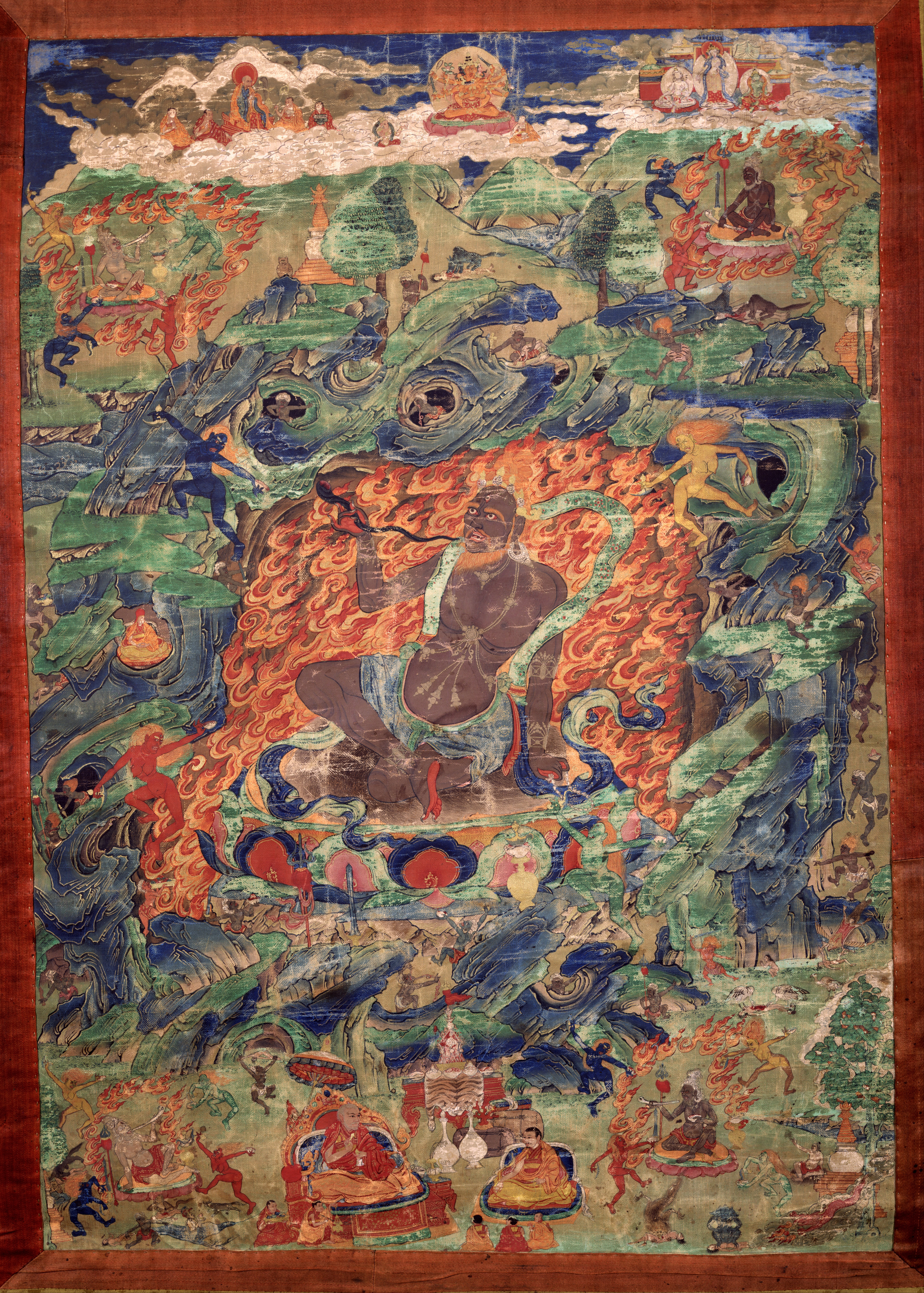
Brahmarupa Mahakala (Mahakala in the form of a Brahman)

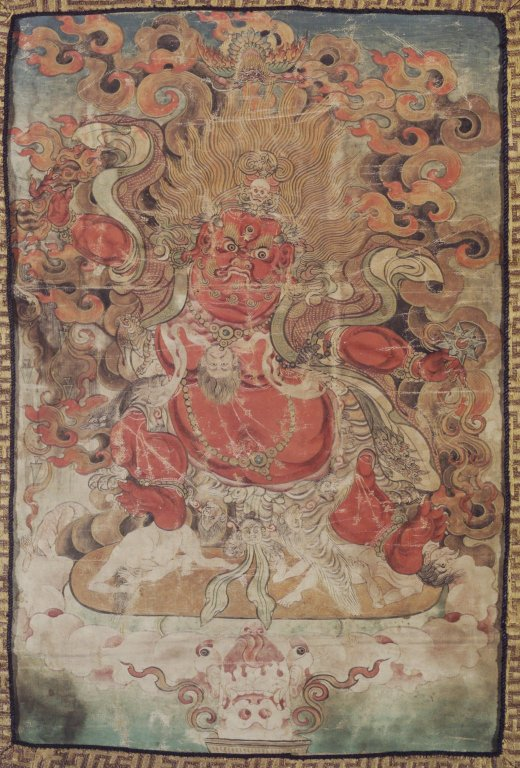
Hayagriva Mahakala (often known as Red Mahakala or Maharakta Mahakala)

=== In China ===
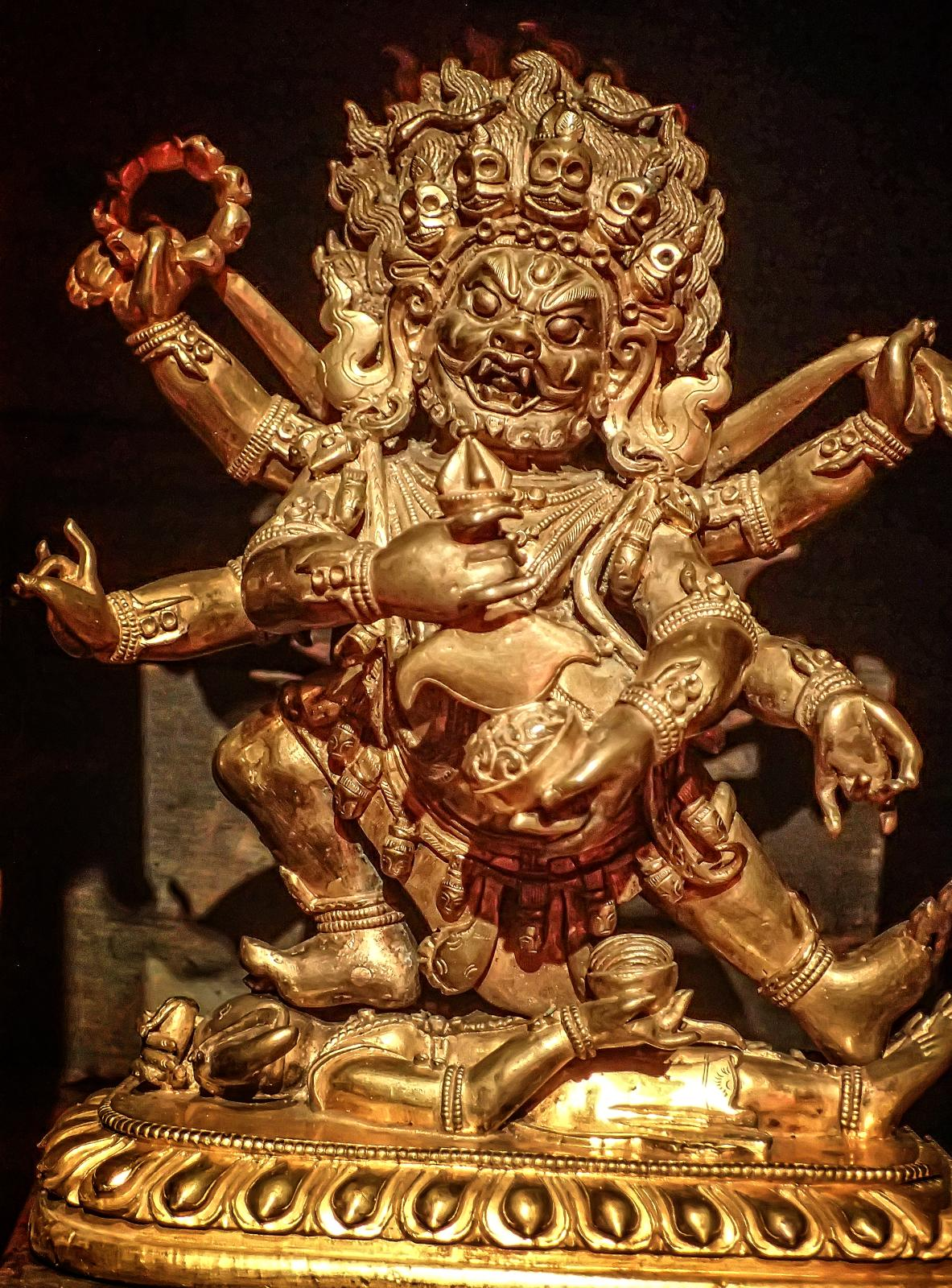
Six armed Mahakala, Qing dynasty China c. 1840 CE, gilt bronze

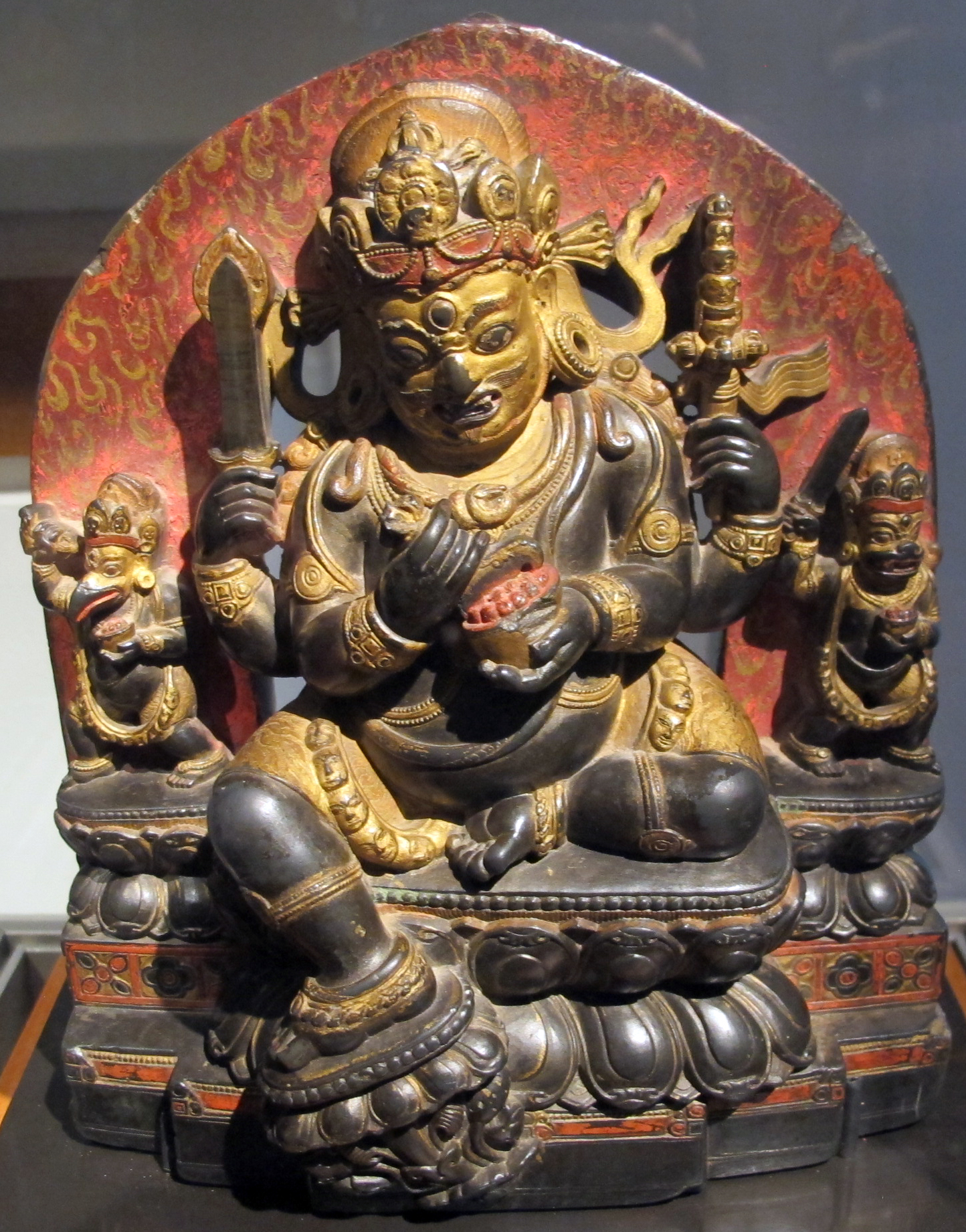
Tibetan Mahakala, 12th century

Mahākāla is mentioned in many Chinese Buddhist texts, although iconographic depictions of him in China were rare during the Tang and Song periods. The deity's name was both transcribed into Chinese characters as 摩訶迦羅 (Móhējiāluó; Middle Chinese (Baxter): mwa xa kæ la) and translated as 大黑天 (pinyin: Dàhēitiān; lit. 'Great Black Deva', with kāla being understood to mean 'black'; Baxter: dɑ^{H} xok then).

He eventually became the center of a flourishing cult after the 9th century in the kingdoms of Nanzhao and Dali in what is now the province of Yunnan, a region bordering Tibet, where his cult was also widespread. Due to Tibetan influence, his importance further increased during the Mongol-led Yuan dynasty, with his likeness being displayed in the imperial palace and in Buddhist temples inside and outside the capital. Mahakala remains a central figure in the minority Buddhist tradition of Azhaliism.

In some texts, Mahākāla is described as a fearsome god, a "demon who steals the vital essence (of people)" and who feeds on flesh and blood, though he is also said to only devour those who committed sins against the Three Jewels of Buddhism.

One story found in the Tang-era monk Yi Xing's commentary on the Mahāvairocana Tantra portrays Mahākāla as a manifestation of the buddha Vairocana who subjugated the ḍākinīs, a race of flesh-eating female demons, by swallowing them. Mahākāla released them on the condition that they no longer kill humans, decreeing that they could only eat the heart - believed to contain the vital essence of humans known as 'human yellow' (人黄; rénhuáng) - of those who were near death. A tale found in Amoghavajra's translation of the Humane King Sūtra relates how a heterodox (i.e. non-Buddhist) master instructed Prince Kalmāṣapāda (斑足王) to offer the heads of a thousand kings to Mahākāla, the "great black god of the graveyard" (塚間摩訶迦羅大黑天神), if he wished to ascend the throne of his kingdom.

As time went by, Mahākāla also became seen as a guardian of Buddhist monasteries, especially its kitchens. The monk Yijing, who traveled to Srivijaya and India during the late 7th century, claimed that images of Mahākāla were to be found in the kitchens and porches of Indian Buddhist monasteries, before which offerings of food were made:

There is likewise in great monasteries in India, at the side of a pillar in the kitchen, or before the porch, a figure of a deity carved in wood, two or three feet high, holding a golden bag, and seated on a small chair, with one foot hanging down towards the ground. Being always wiped with oil its countenance is blackened, and the deity is called Mahākāla [莫訶哥羅, Mòhēgēluō, Baxter: mak xa ka la] or the great black deity [大黑神, pinyin: Dàhēishén, Baxter: dɑ^{H} xok zyin]. The ancient tradition asserts that he belonged to the beings (in the heaven) of the great god (or Maheśvara). He naturally loves the Three Jewels, and protects the five assemblies from misfortune. Those who offer prayers to him have their desires fulfilled. At meal-times those who serve in the kitchen offer light and incense, and arrange all kinds of prepared food before the deity. (...) In China the image of that deity has often been found in the districts of Kiang-nan, though not in Huai-poh. Those who ask him (for a boon) find their wishes fulfilled. The efficacy of that deity is undeniable.

In China, the god was also associated with fertility and sexuality: during the Qixi Festival (a.k.a. the Double Seventh Festival) held on the 7th day of the 7th month of the Chinese calendar, married women traditionally bought dolls or figurines called Móhéluó (魔合羅) or Móhóuluó (摩睺羅) - the term probably deriving from 'Mahākāla' - in the hopes of giving birth to a child.

Ritual texts also prescribe the worship of Mahākāla to women looking for a male partner or to pregnant women.

In addition, he is also commonly invoked as a protective deity in certain mantras, such as the Śūraṅgama Mantra and the Mahamayuri-vidyarajñi-dharani contained in the Mahamayuri Vidyarajñi Sutra, which are popular in Chan Buddhism tradition.

The name of the Moheluo doll, a popular toy during the Song and Yuan dynasties, is said derive from transliteration of Mahākāla.

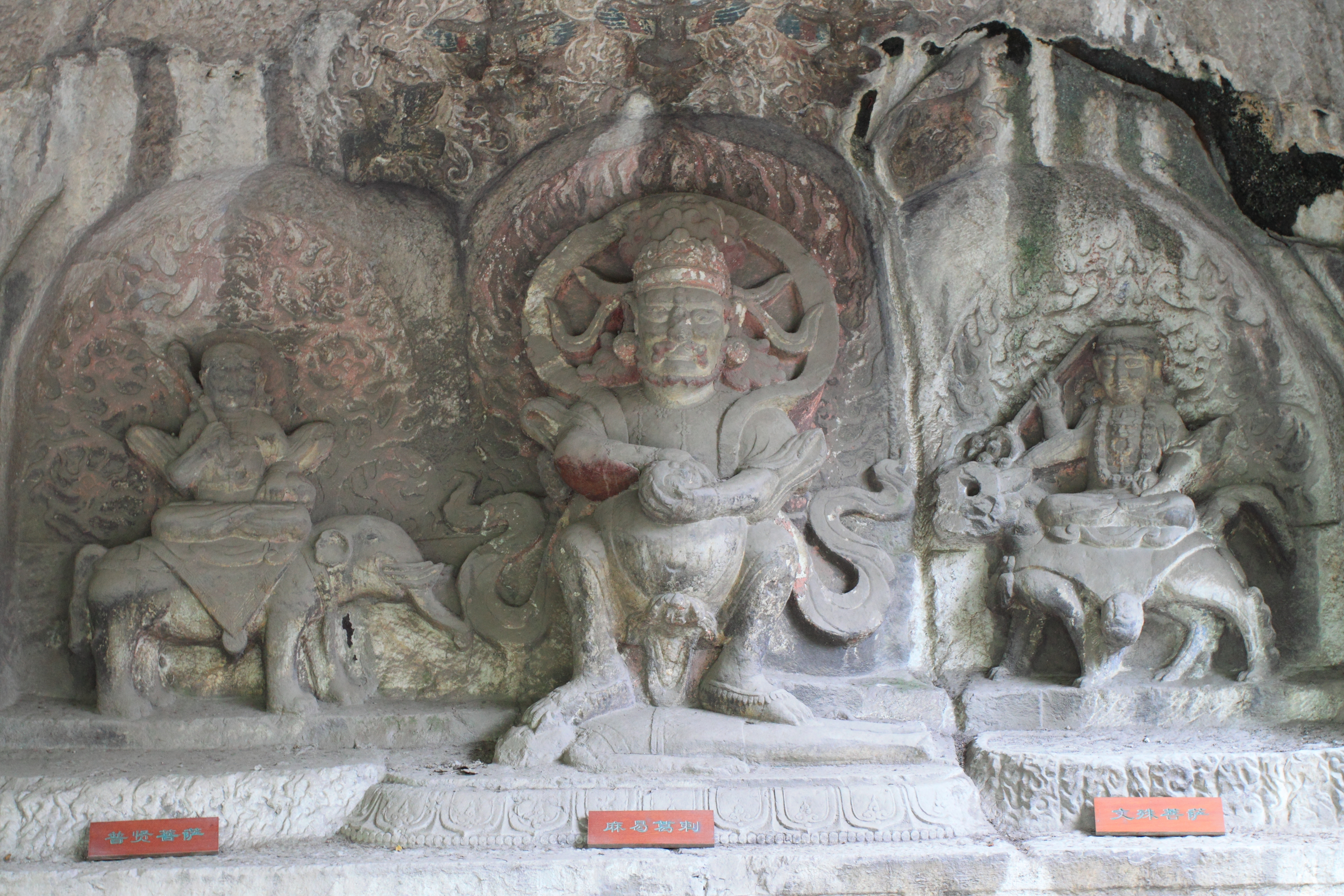
Dàhēitiān (center) flanked by the bodhisattvas Samantabhadra (left) and Mañjuśrī (right). Baocheng Temple, Hangzhou, Zhejiang, China

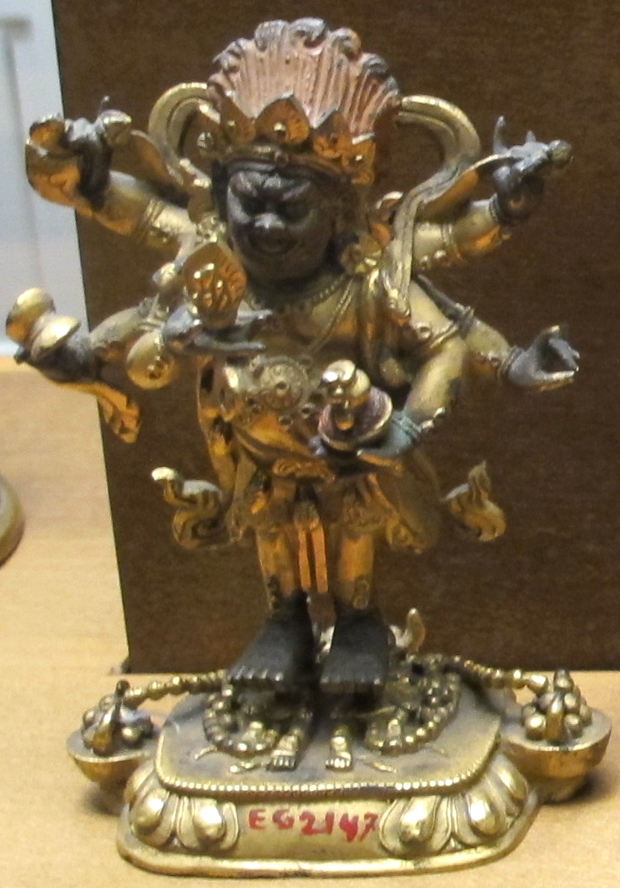
Qing dynasty statuette of Dàhēitiān. China, 17th Century

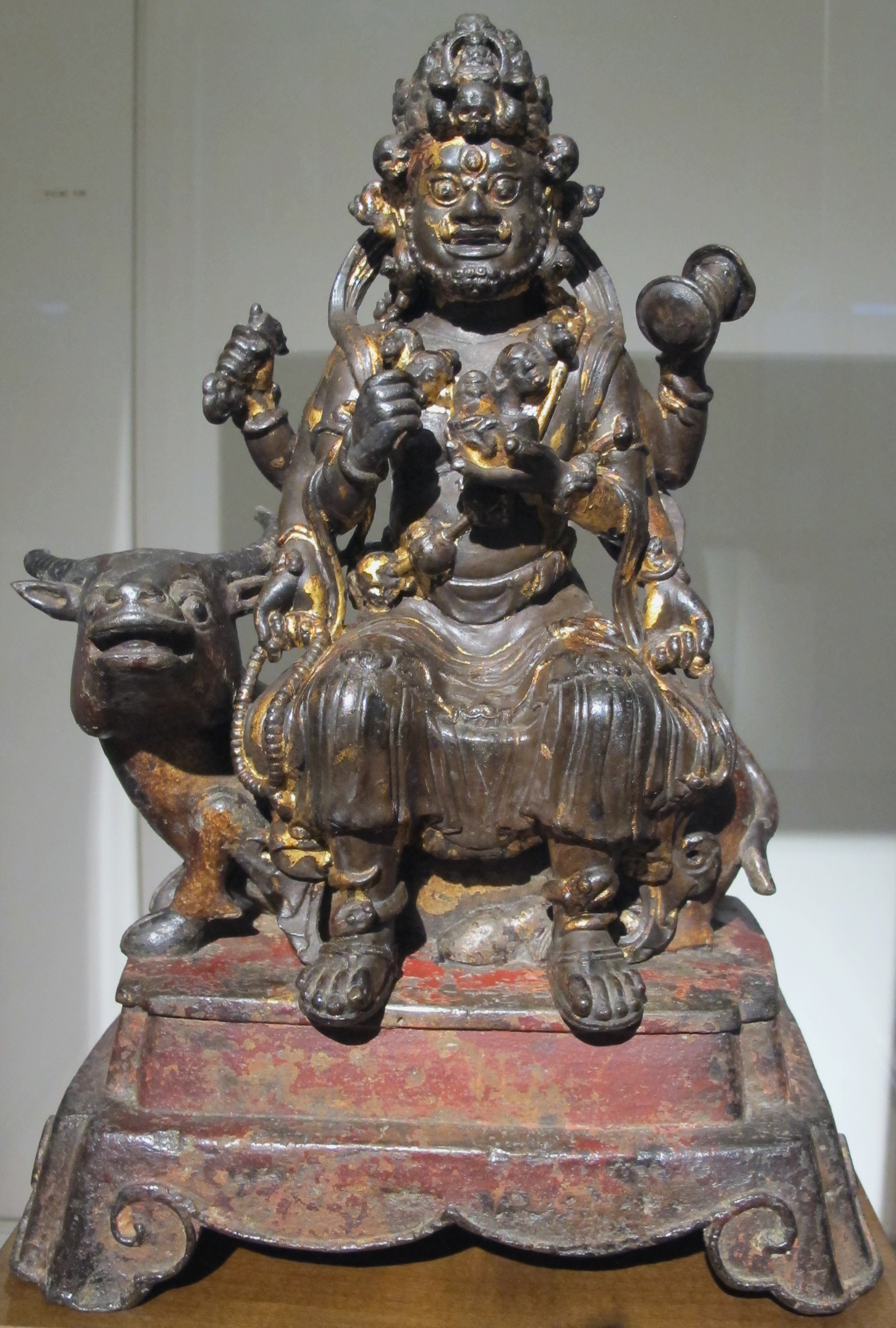
Ming dynasty statue of Dàhēitiān. Sichuan, China. 14th Century (with pedestal from the 16th century)

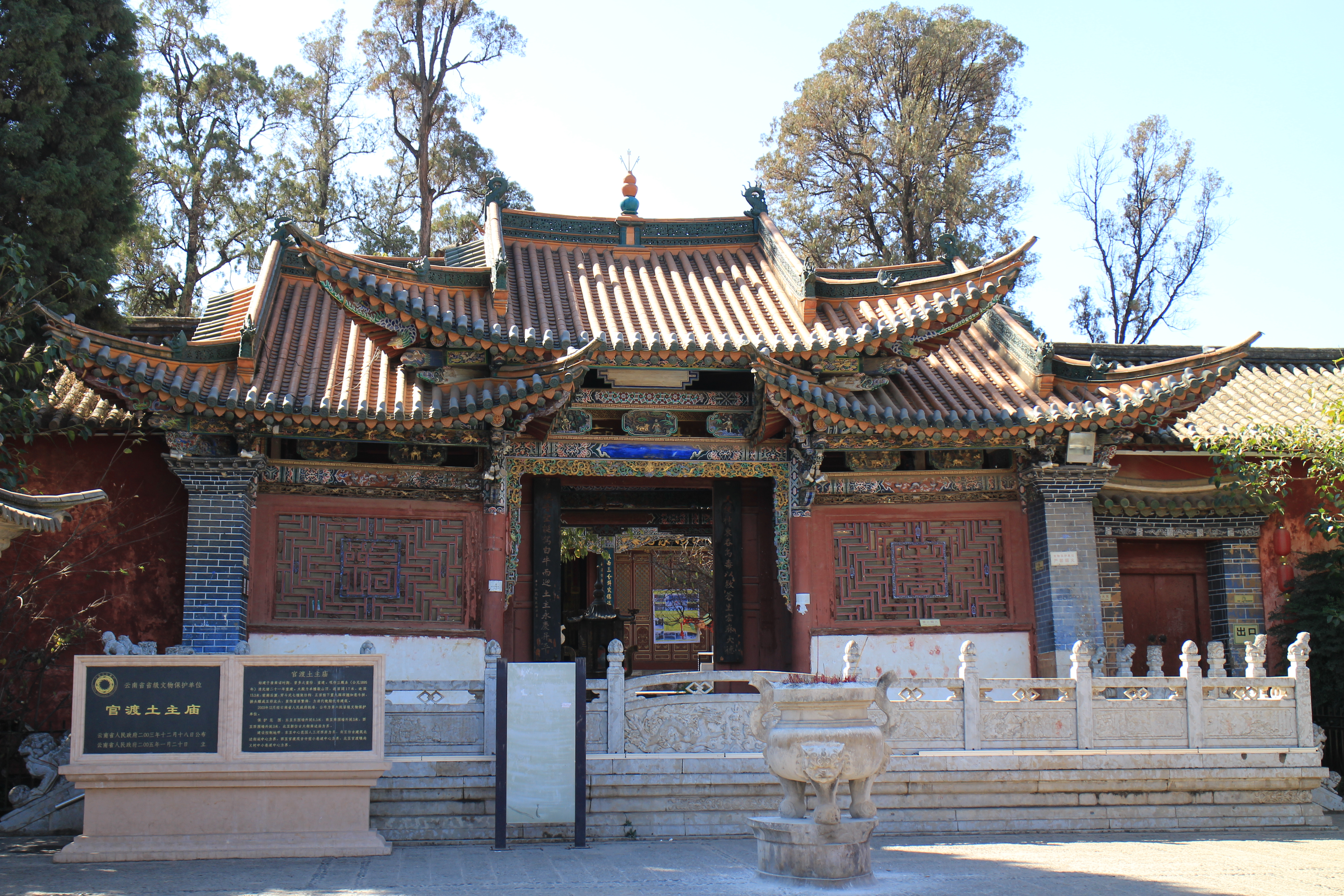
Mahakala Temple (官渡土主庙) in Kunming, Yunnan, China

=== In Japan ===
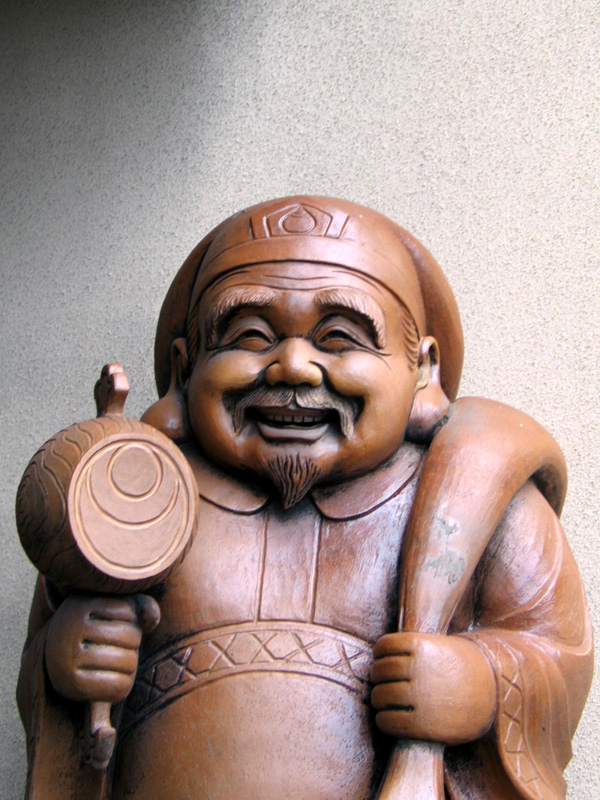
Japanese Daikokuten

Mahakala (known as Daikokuten 大黑天) enjoys an exalted position as a household deity in Japan, as he is one of the Seven Lucky Gods in Japanese folklore.

The Japanese also use the symbol of Mahakala as a monogram. The traditional pilgrims climbing the holy Mount Ontake wear tenugui on white Japanese scarves with the Sanskrit seed syllable of Mahakala.

In Japan, this deity is variously considered to be the god of wealth or of the household, particularly the kitchen. He is recognised by his wide face, smile, and a flat black hat, in stark contrast to the fierce imagery portrayed in Tibetan Buddhist art. He is often portrayed holding a golden mallet, otherwise known as a magic money mallet, and is seen seated on bales of rice, with mice nearby (mice signify plentiful food).

== In Sikhism ==
Depiction of Mahakal from an edition of the Dasam Granth

In Sikhism Mahakal (ਮਹਾਕਾਲ) is used to refer to God. In the text Dasam Granth, which is attributed to Guru Gobind Singh, Mahakal is applied as a name of God to emphasize his supremacy over all beings. In the section titled Bachittar Natak, It states that in a previous incarnation the author was a sadhu meditating in the Himalayan foothills on Mahakal before being called to take birth as Guru Gobind Singh. Further verses the praise Mahakal. Verse 434 of the Chaubis Avtar section states:

I will not first honor Ganesha [Ganesa], nor do I ever meditate upon Krishna or Vishnu (kisan bisan).

I have heard of but do not recognize them. I am absorbed in contemplation at His feet. (434)

Mahakal is my protector...

== See also ==
- Vajrakilaya
- Phra Kalachai Si
