= Nanli Subdistrict =

Nanli Subdistrict 南黎街道
- Subdistrict
- Location in China
- Coordinates: 33.9468°N 116.8001°E
- Country: China
- Province: Anhui
- Prefecture-level city: Huaibei
- District: Xiangshan District
- Time zone: UTC+8 (China Standard Time)

Nanli Subdistrict (Chinese: 南黎街道; pinyin: Nánlí Jiēdào) is a subdistrict situated in Xiangshan district, Huaibei, Anhui, China. As of 2020, it administers the following nine residential neighborhoods:

- Guiyuan Community (桂苑社区)
- Dinglou Community (丁楼社区)
- Lilou Community (李楼社区)
- Xueyuan Community (学院社区)
- Meiyuan Community (梅苑社区)
- Chengli Community (城里社区)
- Shuguang Community (曙光社区)
- Kangle Community (康乐社区)
- Jinhuayuan Community (锦华苑社区)

Shuguang, Kangle, Chengli, and Jinhuayuan were administered by Renmin Road Subdistrict (人民路街道) before its abolishment in 2018.

== See also ==
- List of township-level divisions of Anhui
