= San Phra Kan =

Coordinates: 14.8023°N 100.6151°E

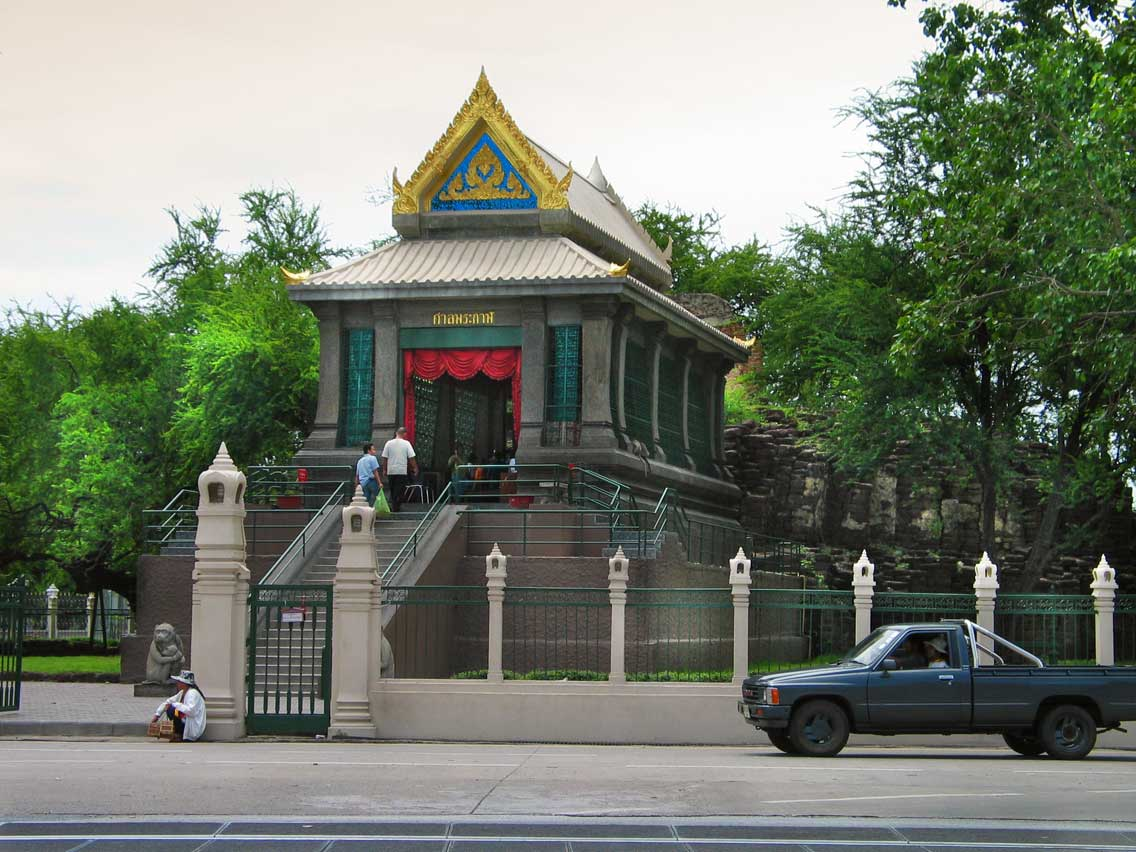
San Phra Kan

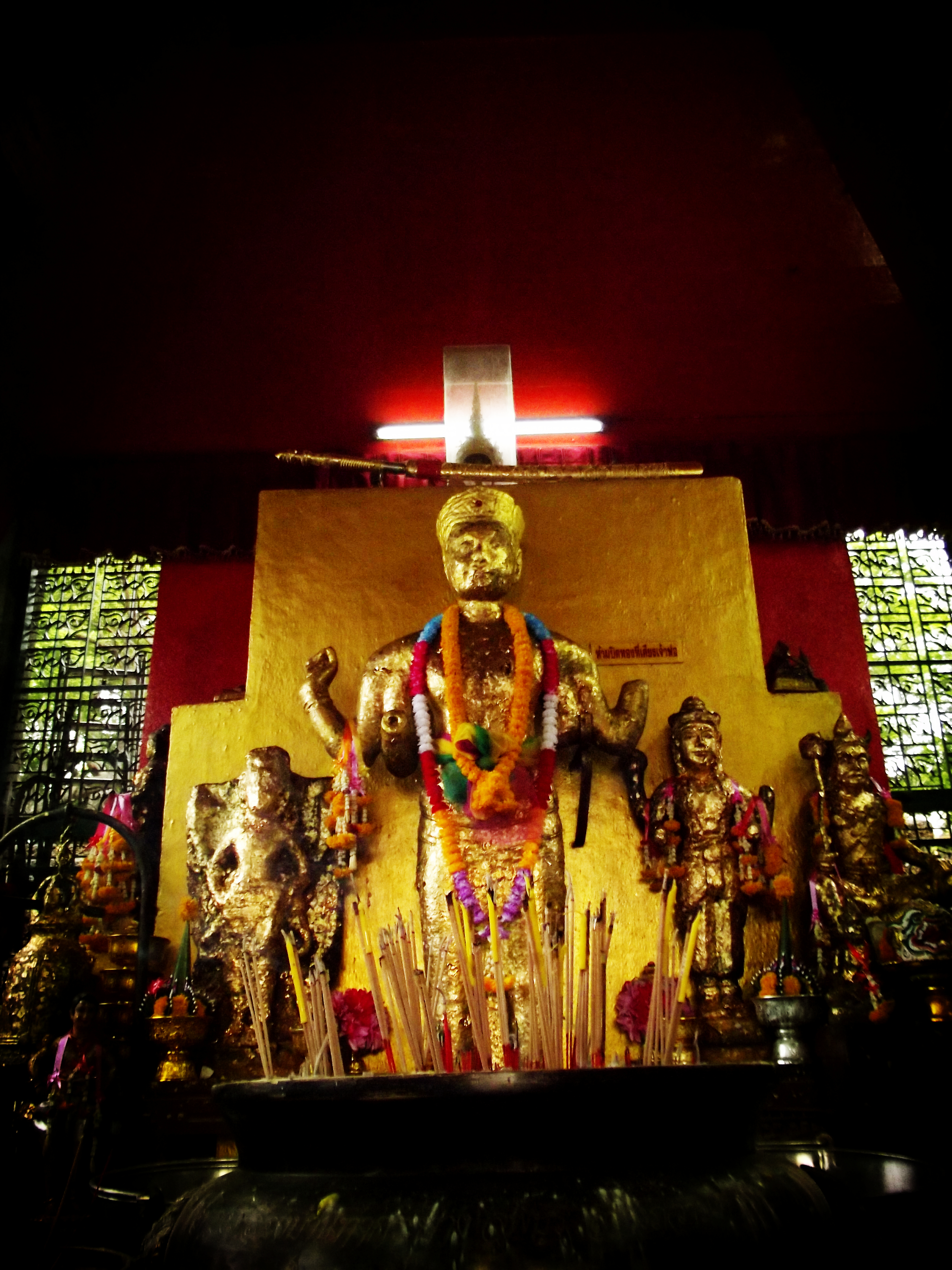
Chao Pho Phra Kan

San Phra Kan (Thai: ศาลพระกาฬ) is a Hindu/Buddhist shrine in the town of Lop Buri in Thailand. The original structure dates to the time of the Khmer Empire. It is a popular tourist attraction best known for the monkeys inhabiting the area.

== Description ==
It is believed that San Phra Kan was constructed in the 15th century of the Buddhist calendar (c.1100 AD), however this claim is disputed by the French archaeologist Jean Boisselier. Initially also known as "San Sung" (lit. tall shrine) due the tall laterite base of the original shrine, it is believed that the ancient structure was the base of a large incomplete stupa, or a that of a completed one which collapsed and was not repaired. Ancient stone tablets with Khmer script and ancient Pallava script discovered at the site do not appear to have been transported from elsewhere and suggest the site was a Theravada Buddhist temple, before being converted into a Hindu shrine.

During the reign of King Narai, a new brick shrine with a stucco exterior was commissioned on the laterite base, stylised in Thai architecture with a Western/Persian influence as was popular of the time. This structure eventually became a city shrine, housing an image of reclining Vishnu, known in Thai as Thap Lang Narai Banthomsin (ทับหลังนารายณ์บรรทมสินธุ์) and a black image of a Hindu deity which came to be known as Chao Pho Phra Kan (Thai: เจ้าพ่อพระกาฬ). Chao Pho Phra Kan is a holy stone image of the old Khmer period, likely to be Vishnu or Avalokitesvara.

Due to the deteriorating shrine structure, the image of Chao Pho Phra Kan was moved to the front of the laterite base and housed in a wooden structure in 1922. Eventually, owing to the significantly dilapidated state of the wooden structure, funds were raised by Lopburi civil servants to reconstruct the shrine in 1951-52 and was sponsored by prime minister Plaek Phibunsongkhram. A total of 304,586.22 baht was raised and a new shrine built in the Applied Thai architecture style was completed and opened by the Department of Architecture on 2 May 1952.

Today San Phra Kan is located in the middle of Si Sunthon roundabout, located across the Northern railway line to Phra Prang Sam Yot. Chao Pho Phra Kan is covered in gold leaf by temple visitors.
