= Huaibei =

Huaibei 淮北市 Huai-pei
- Prefecture-level city
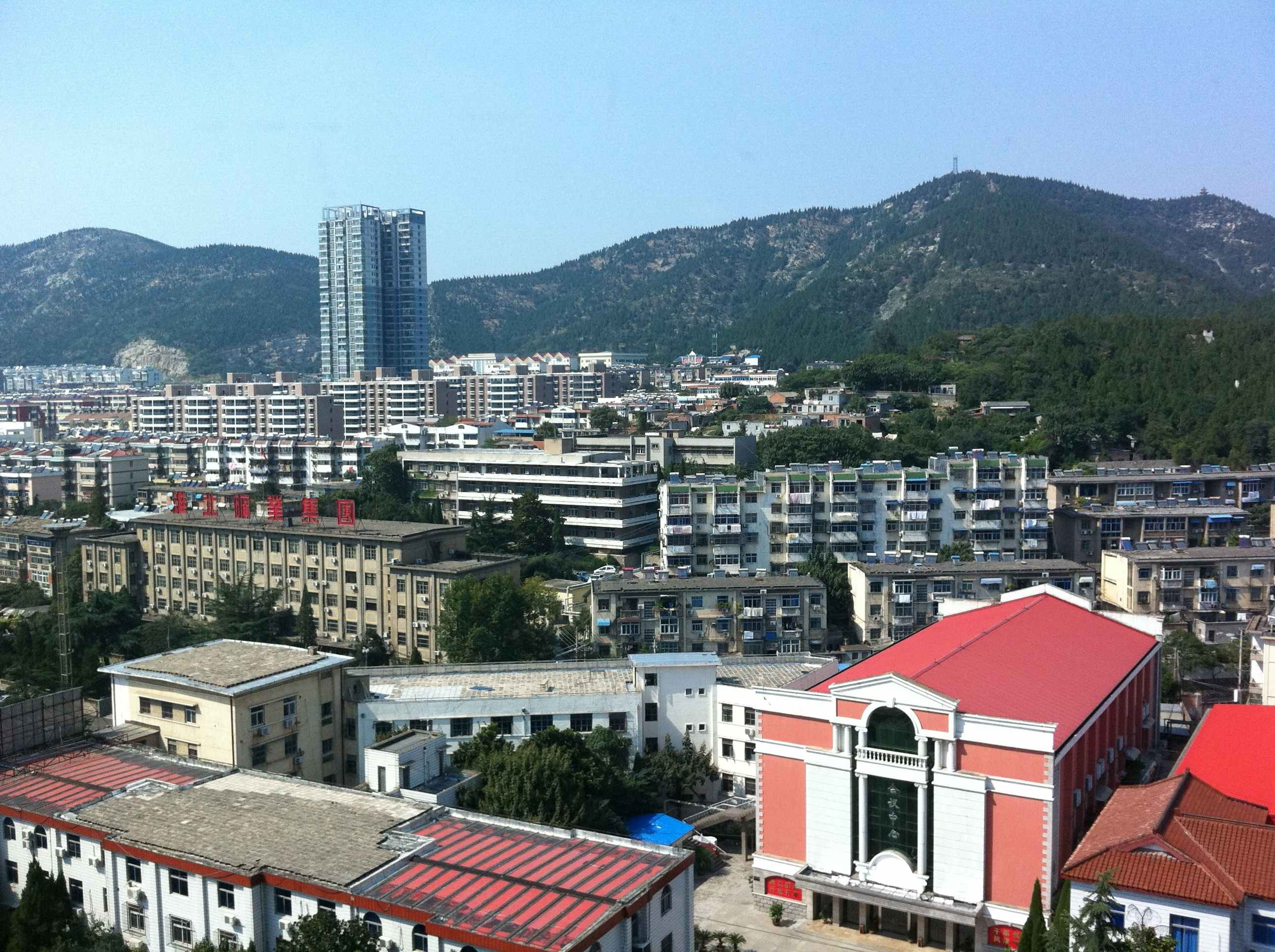
- Huaibei, easterly view, taken from the twelfth floor of the Xiangwangfu Hotel

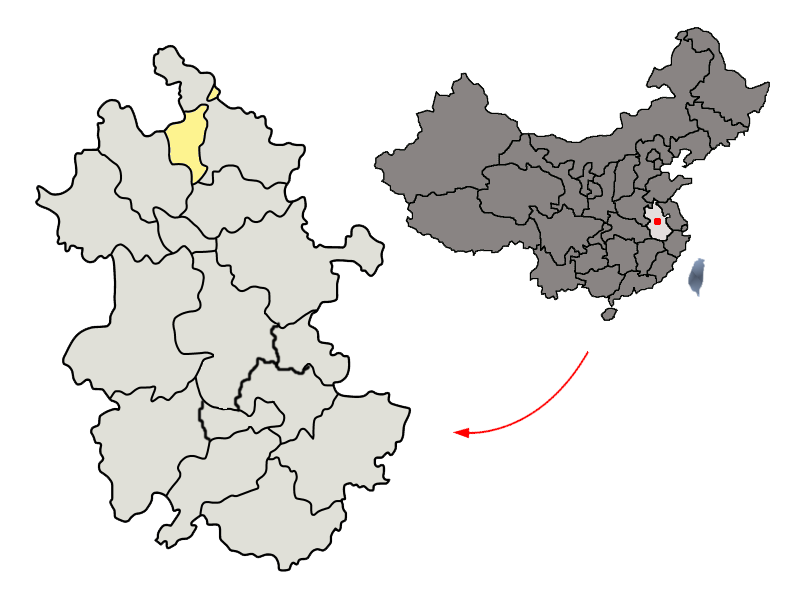
- Coordinates (Huaibei municipal government): 33°57′22″N 116°47′53″E
- Country: People's Republic of China
- Province: Anhui
- Municipal seat: Xiangshan District

Government
  - CPC Secretary: Bi Meijia (毕美家)
  - Mayor: Xu Chongxin (许崇信)

Area
  - Prefecture-level city: 2,740.9 km^{2} (1,058.3 sq mi)
  - Urban: 748.4 km^{2} (289.0 sq mi)
  - Metro: 2,740.9 km^{2} (1,058.3 sq mi)

Population (2020 census)
  - Prefecture-level city: 1,970,265
  - Density: 718.84/km^{2} (1,861.8/sq mi)
  - Urban: 1,037,863
  - Urban density: 1,387/km^{2} (3,592/sq mi)
  - Metro: 1,970,265
  - Metro density: 718.84/km^{2} (1,861.8/sq mi)

GDP
  - Prefecture-level city: CN¥ 122.3 billion US$ 16.2 billion
  - Per capita: CN¥ 61,956; US$ 9,604
- Time zone: UTC+8 (CST)
- Postal code: 235000
- Area code: 561
- ISO 3166 code: CN-AH-06
- License Plate Prefix: 皖F

Huaibei (Chinese: 淮北; pinyin: Huáiběi) is a prefecture-level city in northern Anhui Province, China. It borders Suzhou (Anhui) to the east, Bengbu to the south, Bozhou to the west, and the provinces of Henan to the northwest and Jiangsu to the northeast. The population was 1,970,165 inhabitants as of the 2020 census (2,114,276 in 2010), all integrated in the built-up (or metro) area and the city has an administrative area of 2,741 km^{2} (1,058 sq mi).

== Administration ==
The prefecture-level city of Huaibei administers 4 county-level divisions, including 3 districts and 1 county.

- Lieshan District (烈山区)
- Xiangshan District (相山区)
- Duji District (杜集区)
- Suixi County (濉溪县)

These are further divided into 43 township-level divisions, including 20 towns, 8 townships and 15 subdistricts.

Map
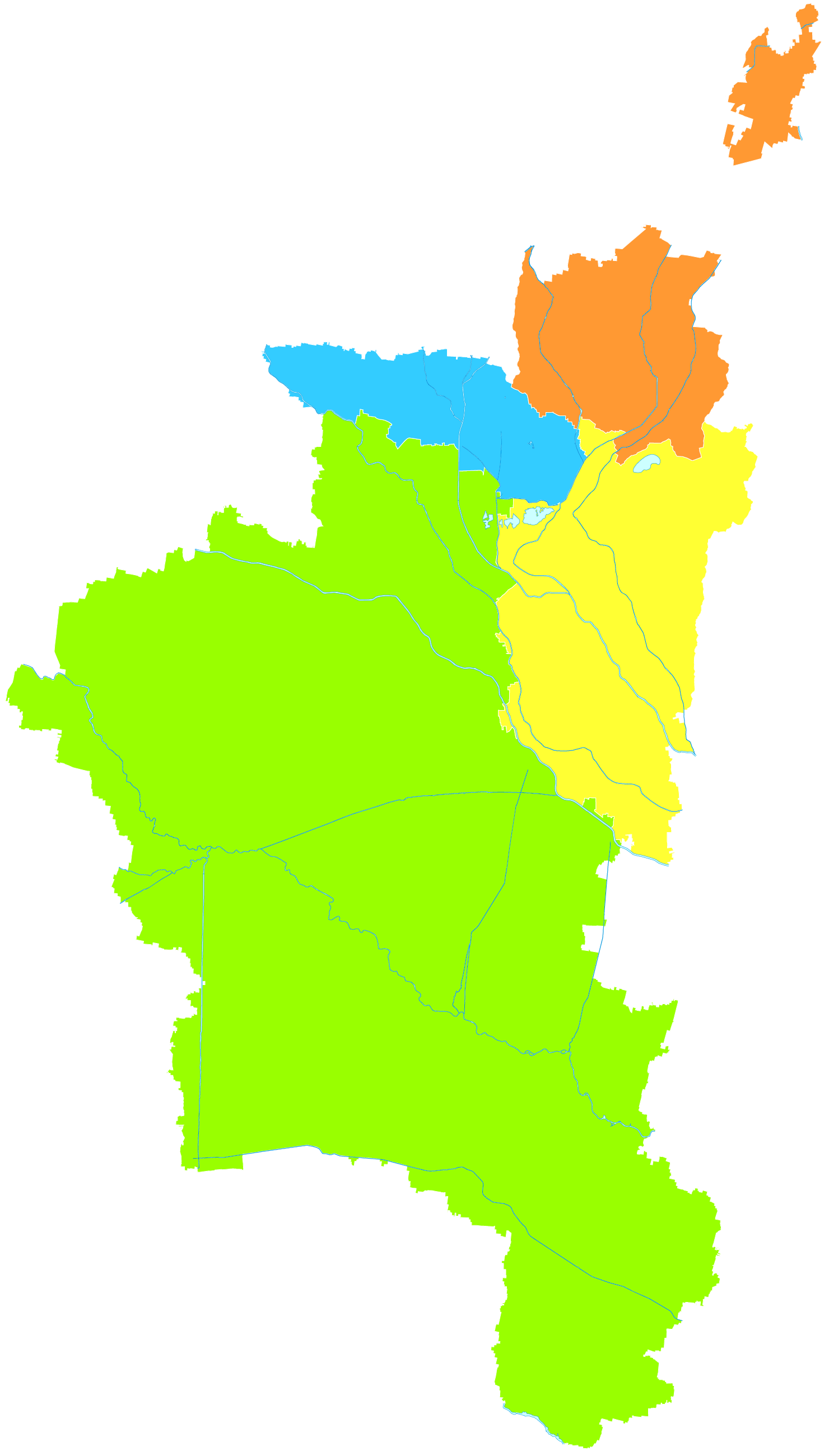

== Natural environment ==
=== Geography ===
Situated in northern Anhui, Huaibei is located at the junction of Jiangsu, Henan, and Anhui. The town of Duanyuan forms the exclave of Duji District that borders Xuzhou (Jiangsu) to the north.

== Sports ==
The Huaibei City Stadium is located in Huaibei. The 30,000-capacity venue is used mostly for football (soccer) matches.

== Climate ==
Huaibei city has a monsoon-influenced humid subtropical climate (Köppen: Cwa). Summers are hot and humid, and winters are cool to cold and dry.

Climate data for Huaibei, elevation 33 m (108 ft), (1991–2020 normals, extremes 1981–present)
Month	Jan	Feb	Mar	Apr	May	Jun	Jul	Aug	Sep	Oct	Nov	Dec	Year
Record high °C (°F)	18.0 (64.4)	25.4 (77.7)	32.1 (89.8)	34.1 (93.4)	36.9 (98.4)	40.4 (104.7)	39.6 (103.3)	38.0 (100.4)	36.9 (98.4)	34.4 (93.9)	27.7 (81.9)	21.4 (70.5)	40.4 (104.7)
Mean daily maximum °C (°F)	6.2 (43.2)	9.6 (49.3)	15.1 (59.2)	21.7 (71.1)	27.0 (80.6)	31.3 (88.3)	32.2 (90.0)	31.1 (88.0)	27.5 (81.5)	22.4 (72.3)	15.0 (59.0)	8.3 (46.9)	20.6 (69.1)
Daily mean °C (°F)	1.6 (34.9)	4.6 (40.3)	9.8 (49.6)	16.2 (61.2)	21.6 (70.9)	26.0 (78.8)	27.9 (82.2)	26.9 (80.4)	22.6 (72.7)	17.0 (62.6)	9.8 (49.6)	3.6 (38.5)	15.6 (60.1)
Mean daily minimum °C (°F)	−1.8 (28.8)	0.8 (33.4)	5.5 (41.9)	11.4 (52.5)	16.9 (62.4)	21.5 (70.7)	24.4 (75.9)	23.7 (74.7)	18.9 (66.0)	12.7 (54.9)	5.9 (42.6)	0.1 (32.2)	11.7 (53.0)
Record low °C (°F)	−12.0 (10.4)	−14.0 (6.8)	−7.3 (18.9)	0.1 (32.2)	6.2 (43.2)	13.3 (55.9)	17.1 (62.8)	13.9 (57.0)	9.1 (48.4)	0.3 (32.5)	−7.2 (19.0)	−14.0 (6.8)	−14.0 (6.8)
Average precipitation mm (inches)	16.0 (0.63)	20.3 (0.80)	33.7 (1.33)	37.8 (1.49)	71.4 (2.81)	110.6 (4.35)	220.3 (8.67)	173.7 (6.84)	63.3 (2.49)	42.2 (1.66)	33.5 (1.32)	18.0 (0.71)	840.8 (33.1)
Average precipitation days (≥ 0.1 mm)	4.2	5.6	6.0	6.9	7.2	7.7	13.0	11.1	7.9	5.6	5.7	4.3	85.2
Average snowy days	3.2	2.9	1.0	0	0	0	0	0	0	0	0.7	1.8	9.6
Average relative humidity (%)	66	64	63	63	65	67	78	80	74	68	69	67	69
Mean monthly sunshine hours	147.2	150.1	190.9	217.3	229.1	215.2	202.4	194.0	182.1	183.1	160.4	156.4	2,228.2
Percentage possible sunshine	47	48	51	55	53	50	46	47	50	53	52	51	50
Source: China Meteorological Administration

=== Natural resources ===
Huaibei has vast quantities of mineral reserves including marble, iron, copper, gold, silver, nickel, cobalt, fire clay and limestone. It also possesses 2.726 million tons of coal.

== Economy ==
=== Industry ===
Huaibei is the home to numerous chemical, construction, machinery, textile, power, electronics, and mineral industrial firms. The city has over 2,000 industrial enterprises, of which 22 large and medium-sized ones are run by the state.

The annual output of raw coal from Huaibei is 2,000 million tons, ranking first in eastern China.

The power industry has also developed rapidly and is currently ranked third in eastern China - Huaibei Power Station has a total installed capacity of 950 MW and an annual electricity output of 620 GW. The Huaibei No. 2 Power Station, with the total installed capacity of l.2 GW, is also being built.

The textile industry in Huaibei is ranked second in Anhui. It has established a comprehensive system of printing and dyeing, wool and silk spinning, and knitting processes. The textile firms have 200,000 spindles, 15,000 looms, with a printing & dyeing capacity of 110 million meters.

Huaibei's winemaking industry is over 1,000 years old. The Kouzi wine from the city has an annual output of 20,000 tons.

The construction industry is developing rapidly with an annual cement output of 2 million tons.

The chemical industry focuses on industrial products such as fertilizers, coke, sulphuric acid, and rubber.

The metallurgy, machinery, electronics, and food industries have also produced more than 100 kinds of products have reached or been approaching the national or international level.

=== Agriculture ===
Huaibei is the main agriculture base for producing and exporting grain, cotton, and domestic animals. The main crops are wheat, maize, cotton, broad bean, rice, and potato. Livestocks include cattle, horse, pig, goat, rabbit, and domestic birds, etc. More than 13,333 hectares (32,950 acres) of land has been cultivated for fisheries that contain a large number of fish, shrimps, and crabs. The city is part of the National Agricultural Comprehensive Development Zones in Huanghai and Huaihai.

=== Foreign trade ===
Huaibei is one of the ten largest coal exporting cities in China and the largest exporter of textile products within Anhui Province. A large exporting enterprise in the city is responsible for producing 13 classes of over 100 kinds of export goods, among them coal, textile, grain, oil, silk, ores, chemicals, and pharmaceutical products. These merchandise are then exported to more than 80 countries and regions such as the United States, Japan, Australia, Canada, Western Europe, Russia, and Hong Kong, etc.

=== Development zone ===
Huaibei has formed South Lake Economic and Technological Development Zone and the Tanxikouzi Economic and Technological Development Zone to attract foreign investors.

== Transportation and communication ==
The railways in the city are linked to Beijing-Shanghai Railway to the east, Urumqi-Lianyungang Railway to the north, and Beijing-Kowloon Railway to the west. Six state and provincial highways run through the city. Qinglongshan Port in Huaibei opens to Hongze Lake that connects to Yangtze River. The city is also only 50 km (31 mi) away from Xuzhou Guanyin Airport.

The 550 MHz stations in Huaibei can receive televised programs from more than 20 channels in China.
