= Lopburi Line =

Railway line in Thailand

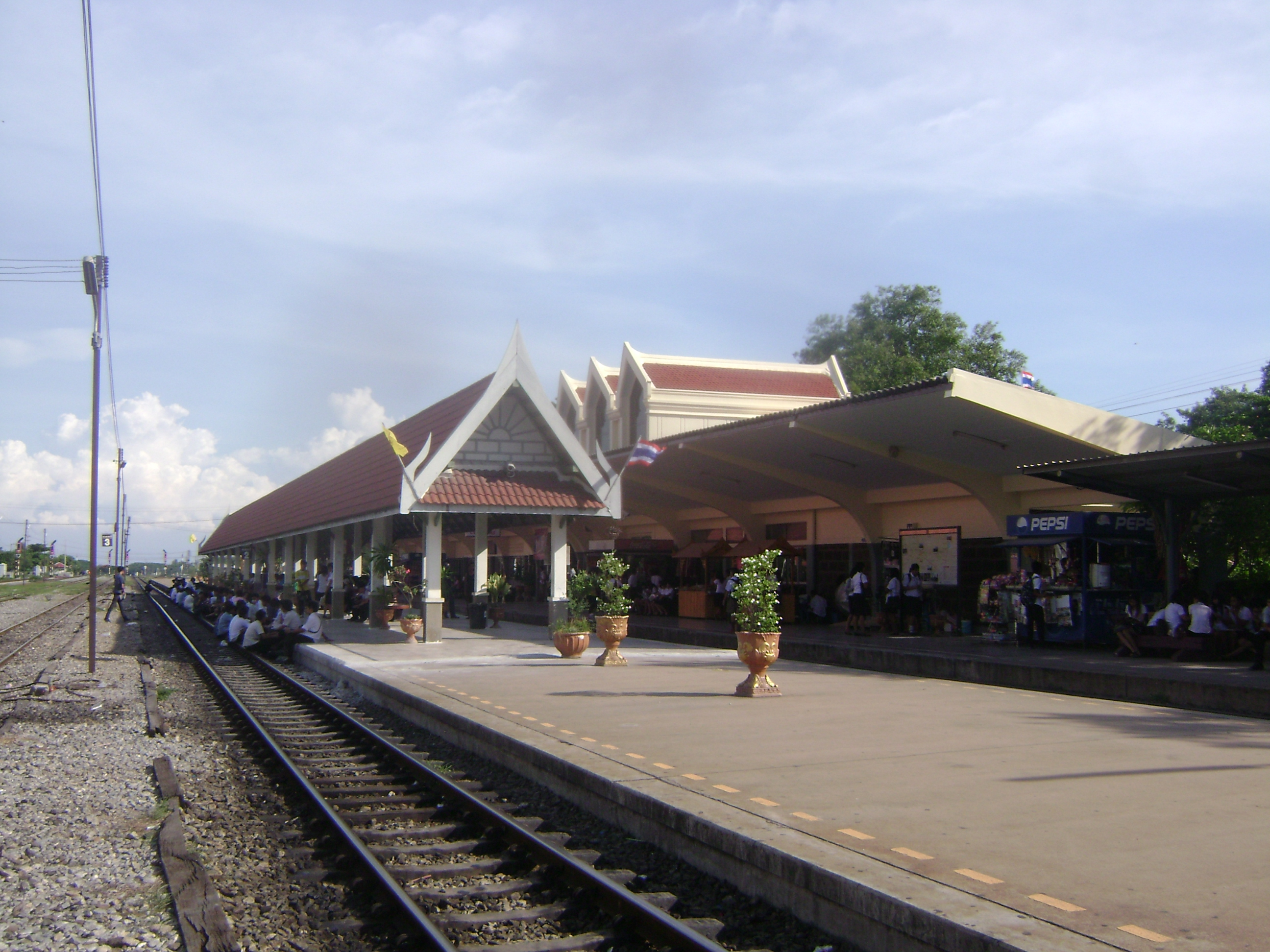
- Lop Buri Railway Station, terminal station of the Lopburi Line

Overview
- Owner: State Railway of Thailand
- Locale: Bangkok, Pathum Thani, Phra Nakhon Si Ayutthaya, and Lopburi
- Termini: Hua Lamphong; Lop Buri
- Stations: 39

Service
- Type: Commuter rail
- System: Greater Bangkok Commuter rail

Technical
- Line length: 132.81 km (82.52 mi)
- Track gauge: 1,000 mm (3 ft 3 3/8 in) metre gauge

Lopburi Line is a railway line of Greater Bangkok Commuter rail, operated by State Railway of Thailand (SRT). The line is all double track. There are seven commuter train services on the line. Main destinations such as Rangsit, Ayutthaya, and Lopburi.

== Services ==
- Commuter train no. 301 Bangkok-Lopburi
- Commuter train no. 303 Bangkok-Lopburi (diesel multiple unit)
- Commuter train no. 311 Bangkok-Rangsit (diesel multiple unit)
- Commuter train no. 313 Bangkok-Ban Phachi
- Commuter train no. 317 Bangkok-Lopburi (diesel multiple unit)

== See also ==
- Greater Bangkok Commuter rail
- Chiang Mai Main Line
- Northern Line (Thailand)
- Kaeng Khoi Line
- Northeastern Line (Thailand)
- Lop Buri Railway Station
- SRT Dark Red Line
- Bangkok Elevated Road and Train System (Hopewell)
