= Ban Mi railway station =

Train station in Thailand

Coordinates: 15.0390°N 100.5412°E

Ban Mi บ้านหมี่

General information
- Location: Piyabut Road, Ban Mi Subdistrict, Ban Mi District, Lop Buri
- Owner: State Railway of Thailand
- Line: Northern Line
- Platforms: 1
- Tracks: 5

Other information
- Station code: บม.

History
- Opened: 31 October 1905; 120 years ago

Services
Preceding station	State Railway of Thailand	Following station
Nong Sai Khao towards Hua Lamphong or Krung Thep Aphiwat	Northern Line	Huai Kaeo towards Chiang Mai
Location

Ban Mi station (Thai: สถานีบ้านหมี่) is a railway station located in Ban Mi Subdistrict, Ban Mi District, Lop Buri. It is located 161.226 km (100.181 mi) from Bangkok railway station and is a class 2 railway station. It is on the Northern Line of the State Railway of Thailand. The station opened on 31 October 1905 as part of the Northern Line extension from Lopburi to Pak Nam Pho.
