= Nong Tao railway station =

Railway station in Thailand

Coordinates: 14.9510°N 100.5823°E

Nong Tao หนองเต่า

General information
- Location: Mu 1 (Ban Nong Tao), Nong Tao Subdistrict, Ban Mi District, Lop Buri
- Owner: State Railway of Thailand
- Line: Northern Line
- Platforms: 1
- Tracks: 2

Other information
- Station code: นต.

Services
Preceding station	State Railway of Thailand	Following station
Khok Kathiam Junction towards Hua Lamphong or Krung Thep Aphiwat	Northern Line	Nong Sai Khao towards Chiang Mai
Location

Nong Tao railway station is a railway station located in Nong Tao Subdistrict, Ban Mi District, Lop Buri. It is located 150.082 km from Bangkok railway station and is a class 3 railway station. It is on the Northern Line of the State Railway of Thailand.
