= Nong Sai Khao railway station =

Railway station in Thailand

Coordinates: 14.9938°N 100.5730°E

Nong Sai Khao หนองทรายขาว

General information
- Location: Mu 5 (Ban Nong Sai Khao), Nong Sai Khao Subdistrict, Ban Mi District, Lop Buri
- Owner: State Railway of Thailand
- Line: Northern Line
- Platforms: 1
- Tracks: 2

Other information
- Station code: ซข.

Services
Preceding station	State Railway of Thailand	Following station
Nong Tao towards Hua Lamphong or Krung Thep Aphiwat	Northern Line	Ban Mi towards Chiang Mai
Location

Nong Sai Khao railway station is a railway station located in Nong Sai Khao Subdistrict, Ban Mi District, Lop Buri. It is located 154.931 km from Bangkok railway station and is a class 3 railway station. It is on the Northern Line of the State Railway of Thailand.
