= Mueang Lopburi district =

Mueang Lopburi เมืองลพบุรี
- District
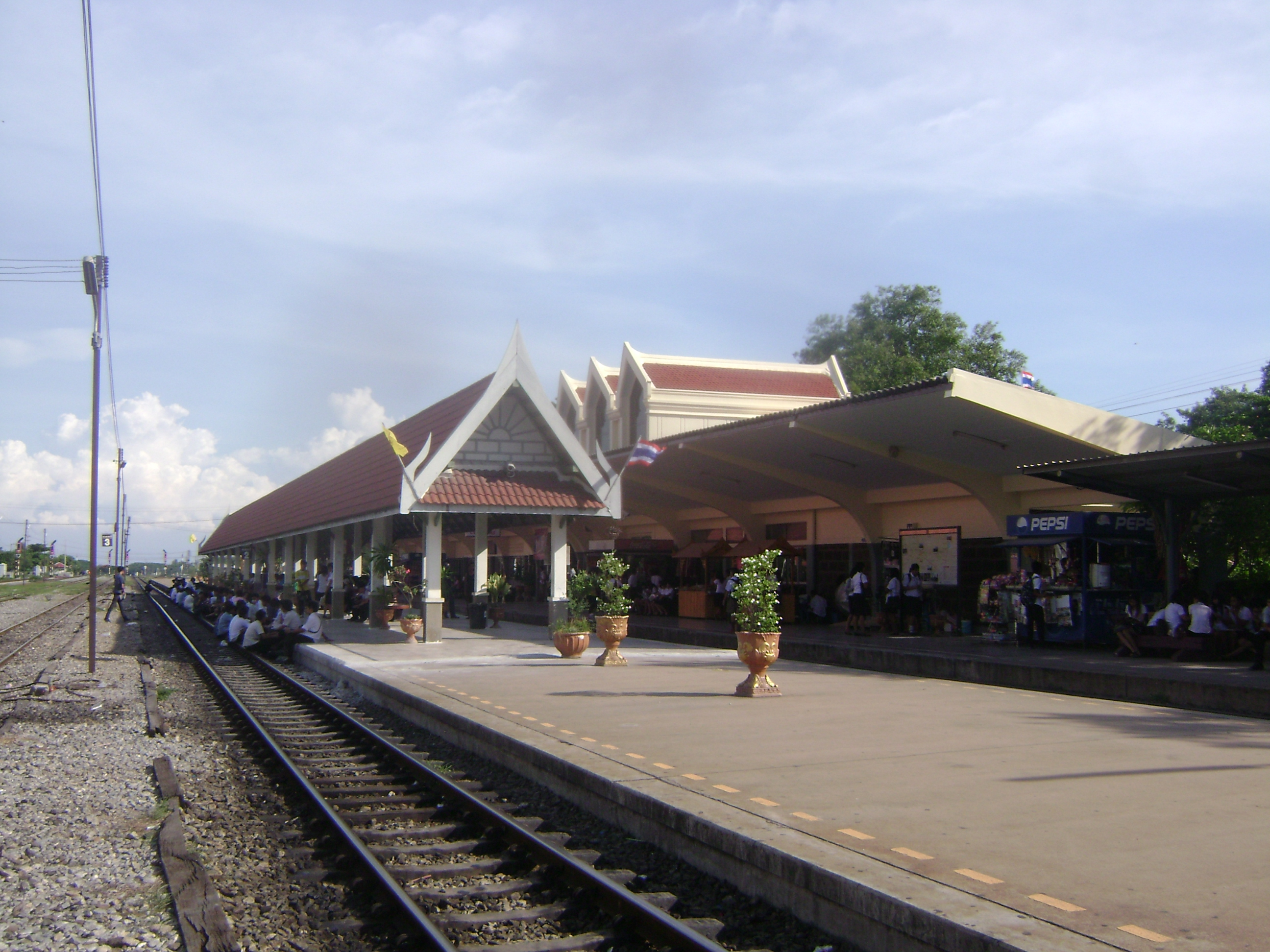
- Lopburi Railway Station

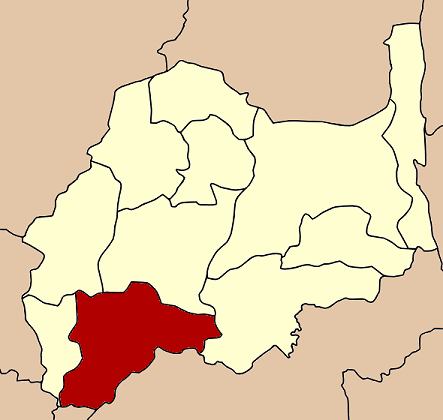
- District location in Lopburi province
- Coordinates: 14°47′53″N 100°39′13″E
- Country: Thailand
- Province: Lopburi
- Seat: Thale Chup Son

Area
  - Total: 565.6 km^{2} (218.4 sq mi)

Population (2007)
  - Total: 247,842
  - Density: 438.2/km^{2} (1,135/sq mi)
- Time zone: UTC+7 (ICT)
- Postal code: 15000
- Geocode: 1601

Mueang Lopburi (Thai: เมืองลพบุรี, RTGS: Mueang Lop Buri, pronounced [mɯ̄aŋ lóp bū.rīː]) is the capital district (amphoe mueang) of Lopburi province, central Thailand. The district is home to Khok Kathiam Air Force Base.

== History ==
Lopburi is an ancient city. In the Khmer era, it was Lavo or Lava Pura, the important city of the eastern part of the Chao Phraya River valley. In the Ayuthaya kingdom, it was a northeastern frontier city. The glorious period of Lopburi was during the reign of King Narai the Great. He stayed in his palace eight to nine months a year, making Lopburi the second capital of the kingdom. After his reign, the city was nearly deserted, only to be enriched again when King Mongkut visited and renovated King Narai's Palace.

Field Marshal Plaek Phibunsongkhram set up Lopburi as the military center of Thailand. He reformed Lopburi city, with its modern center located about 4 km east from the historical center. His predominant building style, Art Deco shows along Narai Maharat Road.

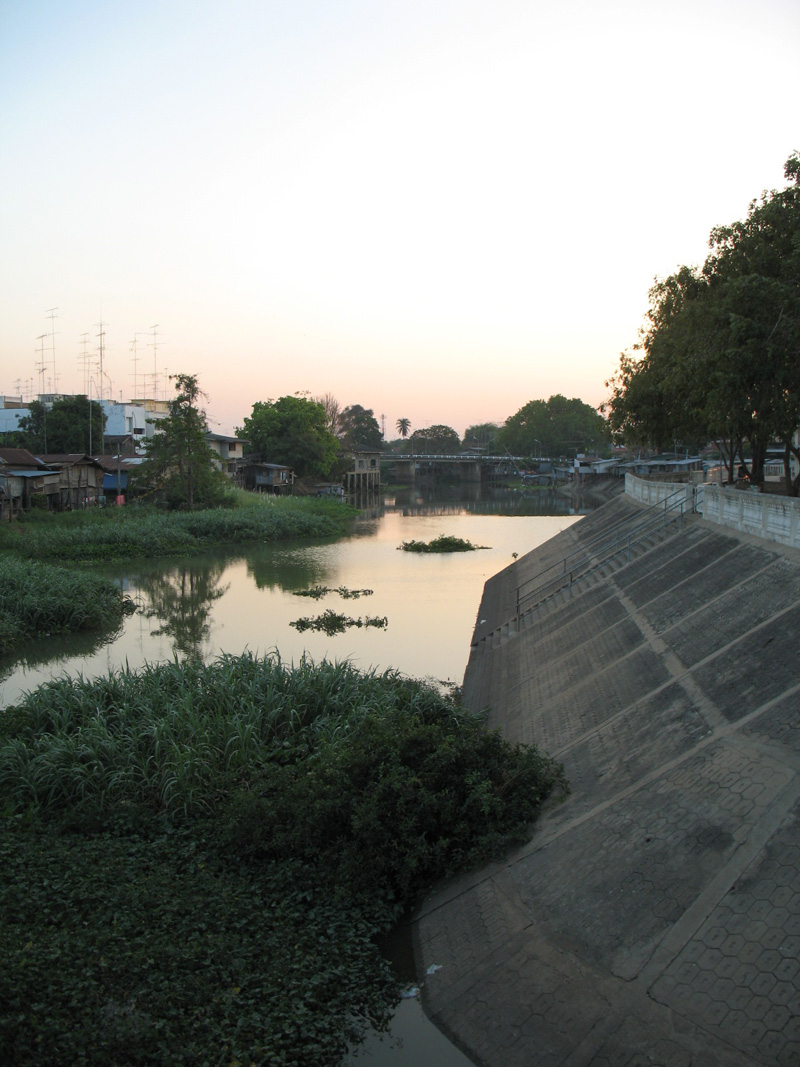
Lopburi River

== Geography ==
The southwestern part of the district is low alluvial plain. The rest is intermixed plains and hills. Besides the Lopburi River, the important water resources are the Sap Lek Reservoir and Khlong Raphiphat. Neighboring districts are (from the west clockwise) Tha Wung, Ban Mi, Khok Samrong and Phatthana Nikhom of Lopburi Province, Phra Phutthabat, Nong Don and Don Phut of Saraburi province, Ban Phraek of Ayutthaya province, and Chaiyo of Ang Thong province.

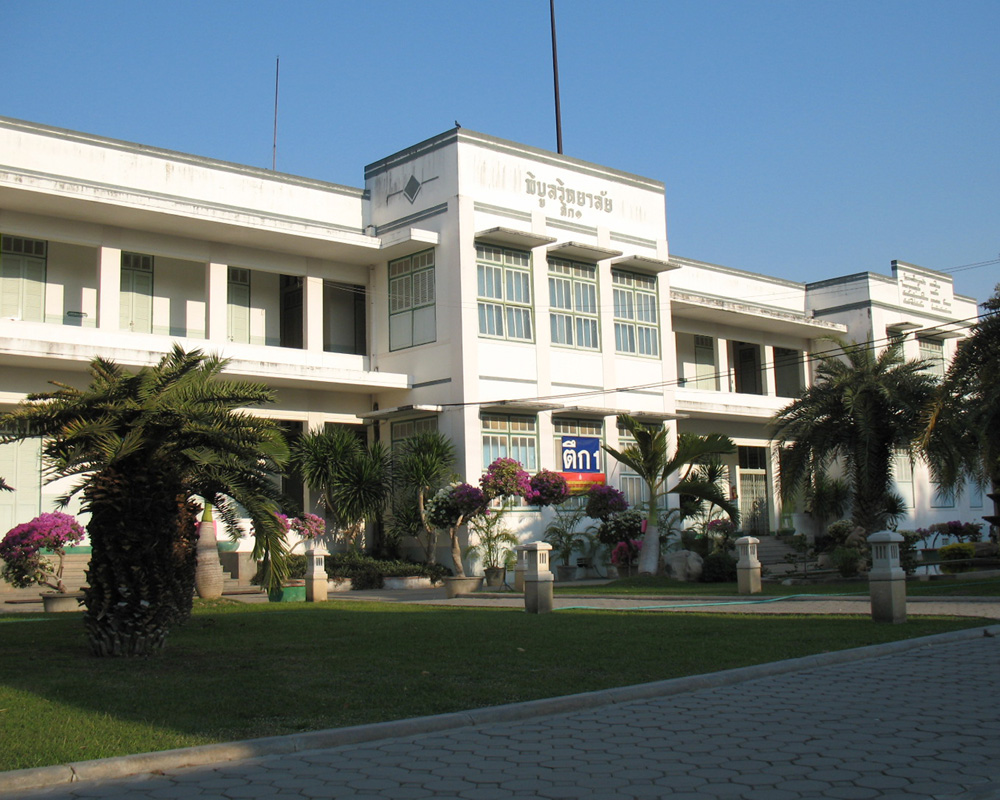
Pibul Wittayalai School Building 1, Art Deco style

== Administration ==
The district is divided into 24 sub-districts (tambons), which are further subdivided into 223 villages (mubans). The town (thesaban mueang) Lopburi covers tambon Tha Hin and parts of Thale Chup Son. There are two further sub-district municipalities (thesaban tambon): Khao Phra Ngam covering tambon Khao Phra Ngam, and Khok Tum covering tambons Khok Tum and Nikhom Sang Ton Eng. There are a further 19 tambon administrative organizations (TAO).

No.	Name	Thai	Pop.
1.	Thale Chup Son	ทะเลชุบศร	34,742
2.	Tha Hin	ท่าหิน	8,487
3.	Kok Ko	กกโก	8,304
4.	Kong Thanu	โก่งธนู	4,893
5.	Khao Phra Ngam	เขาพระงาม	28,664
6.	Khao Sam Yot	เขาสามยอด	28,262
7.	Khok Kathiam	โคกกะเทียม	4,833
8.	Khok Lam Phan	โคกลำพาน	3,554
9.	Khok Tum	โคกตูม	15,504
10.	Ngio Rai	งิ้วราย	5,592
11.	Don Pho	ดอนโพธิ์	3,582
12.	Talung	ตะลุง	5,218
14.	Tha Khae	ท่าแค	13,666
15.	Tha Sala	ท่าศาลา	12,515
16.	Nikhom Sang Ton Eng	นิคมสร้างตนเอง	11,737
17.	Bang Khan Mak	บางขันหมาก	8,935
18.	Ban Khoi	บ้านข่อย	3,081
19.	Thai Talat	ท้ายตลาด	3,039
20.	Pa Tan	ป่าตาล	12,523
21.	Phrommat	พรหมมาสตร์	6,779
22.	Pho Kao Ton	โพธิ์เก้าต้น	10,540
23.	Pho Tru	โพธิ์ตรุ	2,721
24.	Si Khlong	สี่คลอง	1,067
25.	Thanon Yai	ถนนใหญ่	9,604

Geocode 13 not used.

== Transportation ==
The district is served by the State Railway of Thailand's Ban Pa Wai, Lopburi, Tha Khae, and Khok Kathiam Railway Stations.
