= Huai Kaeo railway station =

Railway station in Lop Buri province, Thailand

Coordinates: 15.0701°N 100.5105°E

Huai Kaeo ห้วยแก้ว

General information
- Location: Mu 3 (Ban Huai Kaeo), Sai Huai Kaeo Subdistrict, Ban Mi District, Lop Buri
- Owner: State Railway of Thailand
- Line: Northern Line
- Platforms: 1
- Tracks: 3

Other information
- Station code: หก.

Services
Preceding station	State Railway of Thailand	Following station
Ban Mi towards Hua Lamphong or Krung Thep Aphiwat	Northern Line	Phai Yai Halt towards Chiang Mai
Location

Huai Kaeo railway station is a railway station located in Sai Huai Kaeo Subdistrict, Ban Mi District, Lop Buri. It is located 165.949 km from Bangkok railway station and is a class 3 railway station. It is on the Northern Line of the State Railway of Thailand. Due to its distant location in relation to other villages in the subdistrict, the station mainly acts as a manned passing loop for trains on the main line.
