= Lopburi 2 (Tha Wung) railway station =

Railway station in Thailand

Lopburi 2 (Tha Wung) ลพบุรี 2 (ท่าวุ้ง)
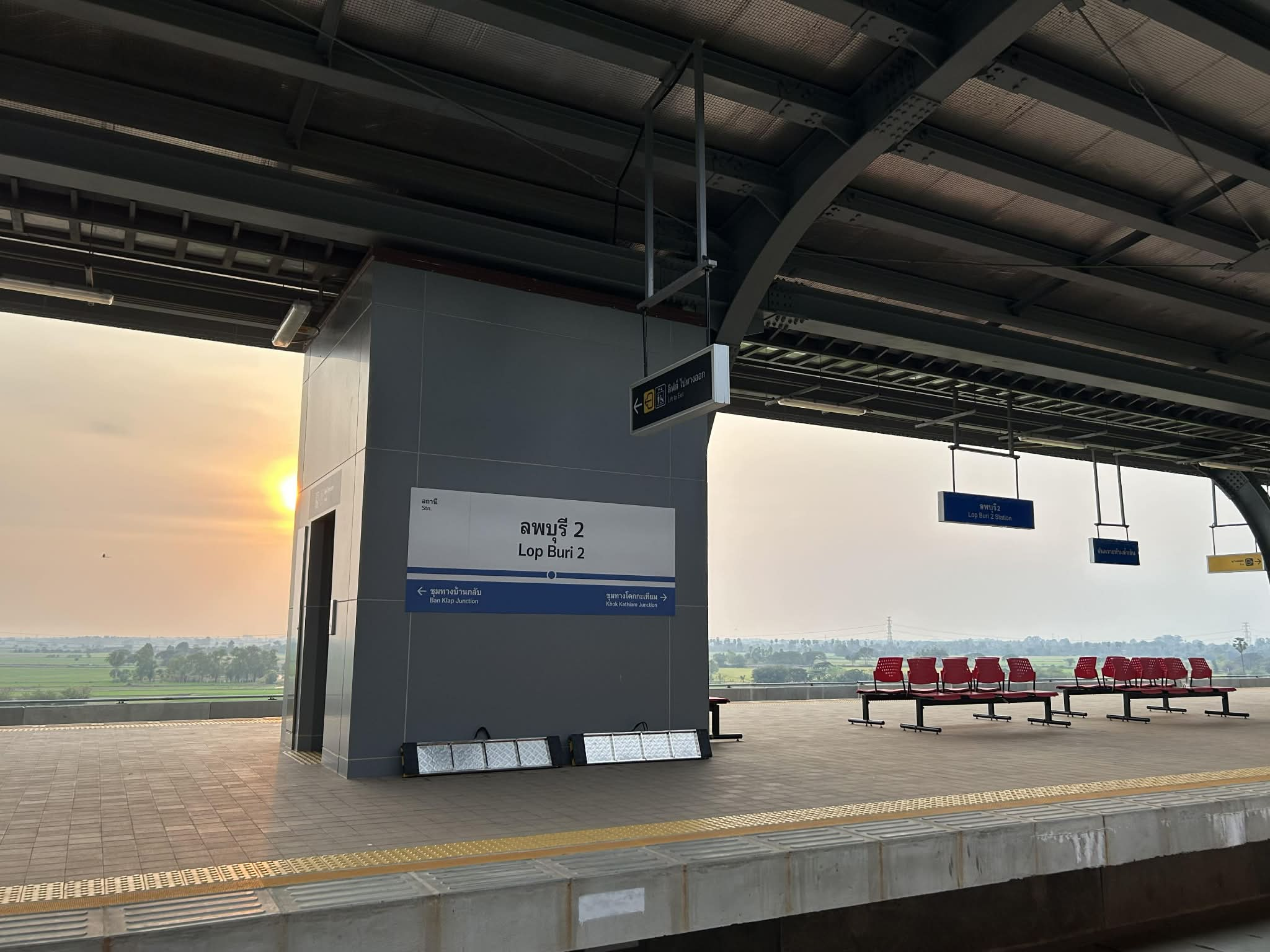
- Station platform

General information
- Location: Pho Talat Kaeo Subdistrict, Tha Wung district, Lopburi province
- Owner: State Railway of Thailand
- Line: Northern Line
- Platforms: 4
- Tracks: 4

Other information
- Station code: 1049

History
- Opened: 5 December 2025

Services
Preceding station	State Railway of Thailand	Following station
Ban Klap Junction Terminus	Northern Line Lopburi Bypass Line	Khok Kathiam Junction Terminus
Location

Lopburi 2 (Tha Wung) railway station is an elevated railway station located in Pho Talat Kaeo Subdistrict, Tha Wung district, Lopburi. It is located 141.757 km from Bangkok railway station and is a class 1 railway station. It is located on the Lopburi Bypass branch line of Northern Line of the State Railway of Thailand. The station opened on 5 December 2025 as part of the double-tracking project between Lopburi and Pak Nam Pho. The bypass route was constructed due to the inability for double-track construction as the mainline tracks run adjacent to Phra Prang Sam Yot to prevent damage to the historical site.

It currently replaces Lopburi railway station as the main station for Lopburi city for rapid and express services between Bangkok and Chiang Mai. A free bus service operated by SRT connects Lopburi station and Lopburi 2 station. It is the only elevated railway station in the province.

== See also ==
- Lopburi railway station
