= Lopburi =

City in Thailand

Lopburi ลพบุรี Lavo
- Town Municipality
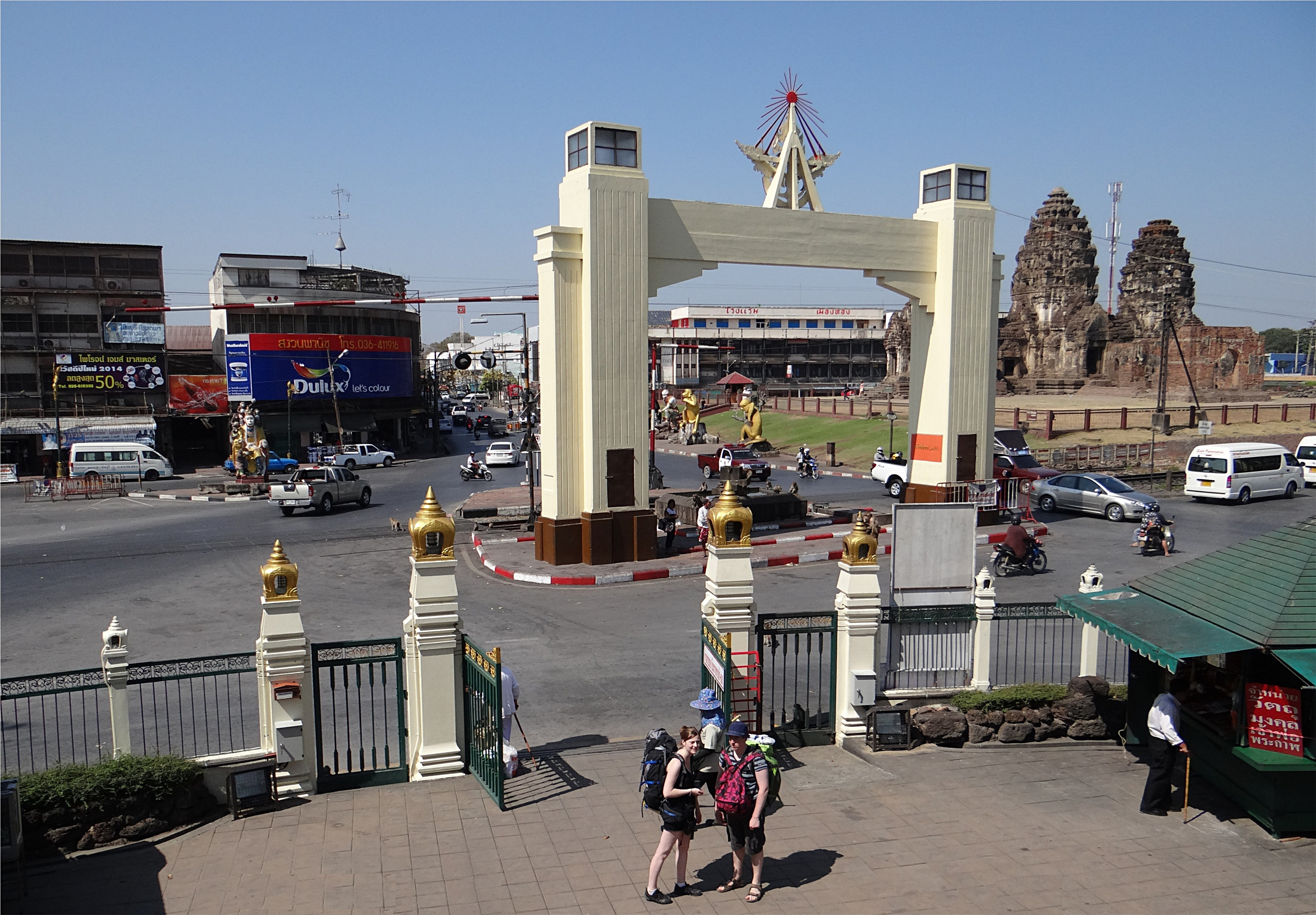
- Lopburi City Gate as seen from San Phra Kan shrine, downtown Lopburi
- Nickname: Monkey City
- Location within Thailand
- Coordinates: 14°48′0″N 100°37′37″E
- Country: Thailand
- Province: Lopburi Province
- District: Amphoe Mueang Lopburi
- Elevation: 19 m (62 ft)

Population
  - Total: 58,000
- Time zone: UTC+7 (ICT)

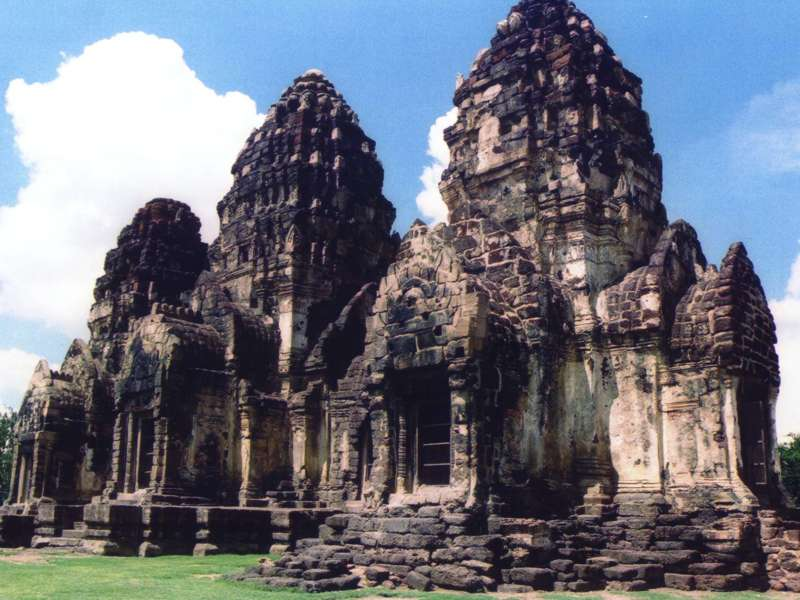
Prang Sam Yot, the Khmer temple in Lopburi

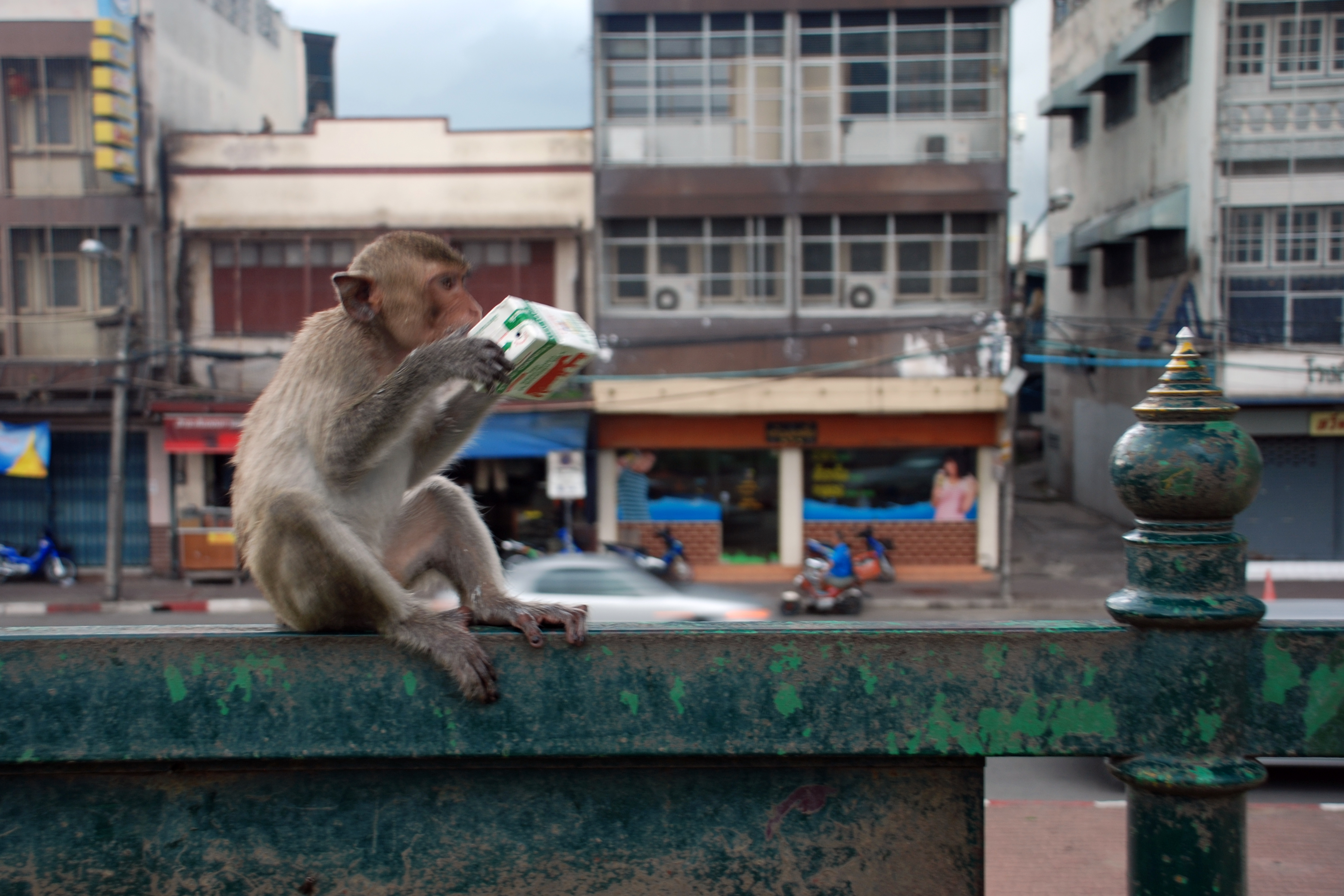
A crab-eating macaque in Lopburi

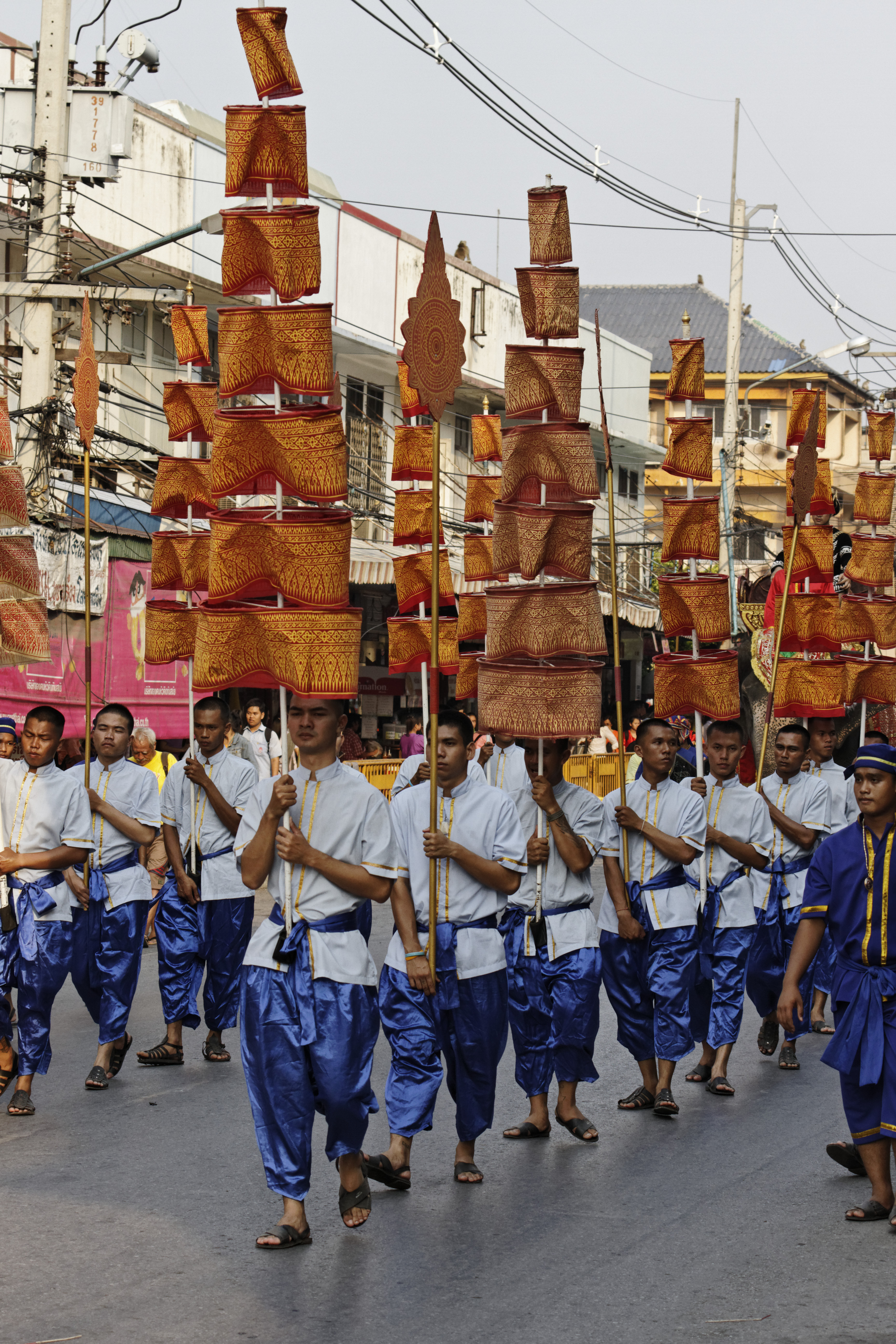
Lopburi Narai Fair in February

Lopburi (Thai: ลพบุรี, RTGS: Lop Buri, pronounced [lóp bū.rīː]) is the capital city of Lopburi Province in Thailand, about 150 km (93 mi) northeast of Bangkok. The town (thesaban mueang) covers the whole of tambon Tha Hin and part of Thale Chup Son in Mueang Lopburi District, an area of 6.85 km^{2} (2.64 sq mi), and has a population of 58,000. It is known for the long-tailed macaques that live around its Khmer monuments, and the Royal Thai Army Special Warfare Command is based just outside it.

The site has been occupied since prehistory and was one of the larger moated settlements of the Dvaravati period, when it was a regional centre with more subordinate towns than any other on the central plain. As Lavapura, or Lavo, it was incorporated into the Khmer Empire under Suryavarman I, and Chinese and European records of the following centuries know it under further names. Under Ayutthaya it was a stronghold of the kings, and in the mid-17th century King Narai made it a second capital and lived there for much of the year.

== Name ==
The earliest confirmed occurrence of the name Lavapura is on silver coins inscribed "lava" on the obverse and "pura" on the reverse in a Pallava-derived script of the seventh or eighth century; several such coins were recovered in 1966 from a hoard found in an ancient jar in U Thong.

Foreign records give the name in other forms. Lopburi appears in Book III of Marco Polo's Travels as Locach, from the Cantonese pronunciation of Lavo, "Lo-huk", and as "Lo-ho" in chapter 20 of the History of Yuan. A scribal error in the same book of the Travels, which substituted Java for Champa as the point of departure of the route southward, placed Locach far to the south of its real position; Henry Yule observed that sixteenth-century geographers following those editions accordingly drew a southern continent there.

== History ==
=== Prehistory ===
- Several flaked stone tools were discovered in Ban Mi district, dated to the Paleolithic Age, in 1931.
- A number of tools, human burial sites and bronze accessories of the Iron Age were found in the Lop Buri river basin in 1964.
- Bracelets and beads dated 2700–3500 years old were revealed at Ban Khok Charoen in 1966–1970.
- Prehistoric human skeletons and clay jugs were found in Ban Tha Kae in 1979.
- A copper source was discovered in Khao Wong Phrachan in 1986–1994.
- Ground inspection at Ban Tha Kae by Ciarla in 1992 found traces of moats that aerial photography had missed; the site had by then been largely destroyed by quarrying for caliche.
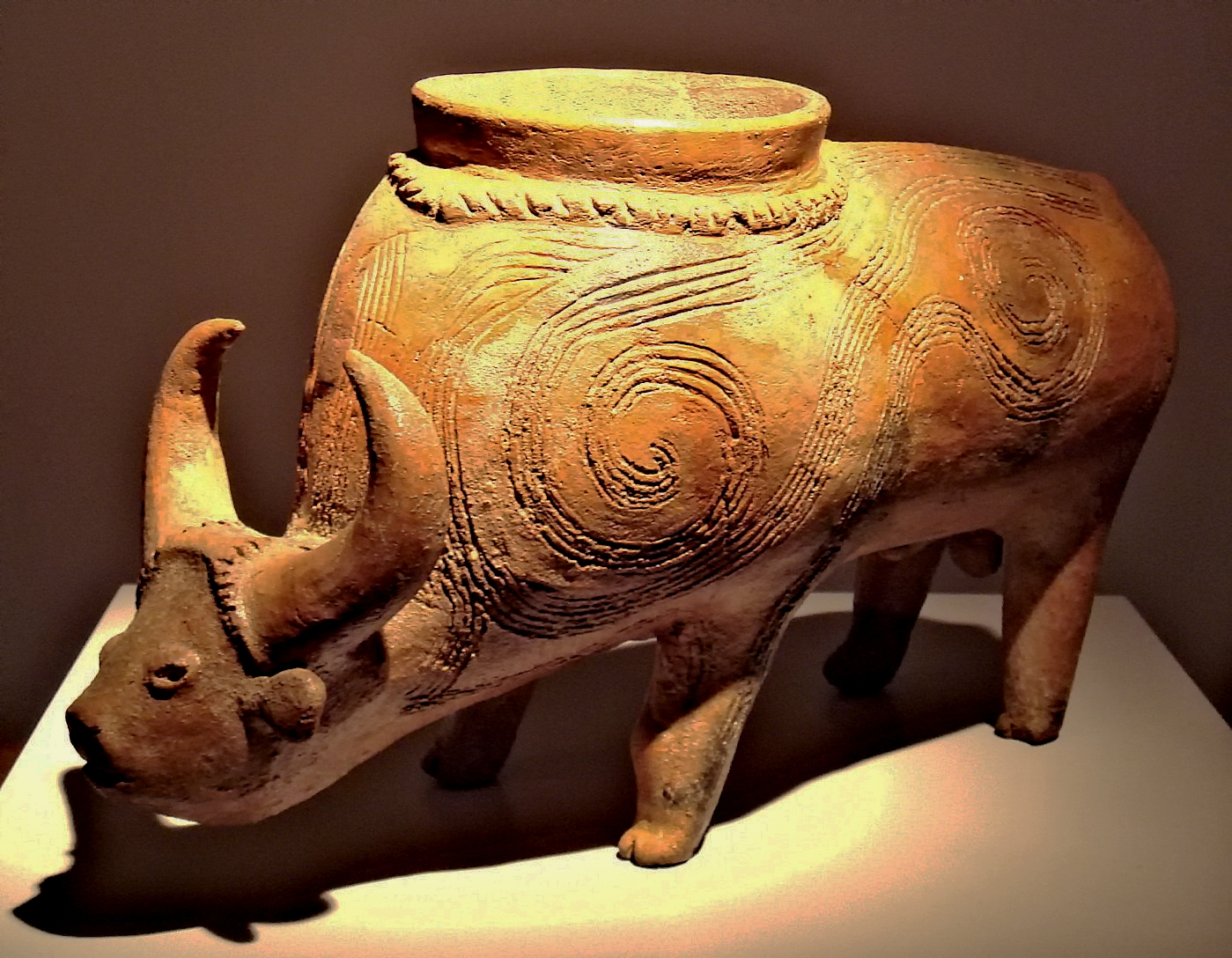
Water buffalo, Lopburi, 2300 BCE

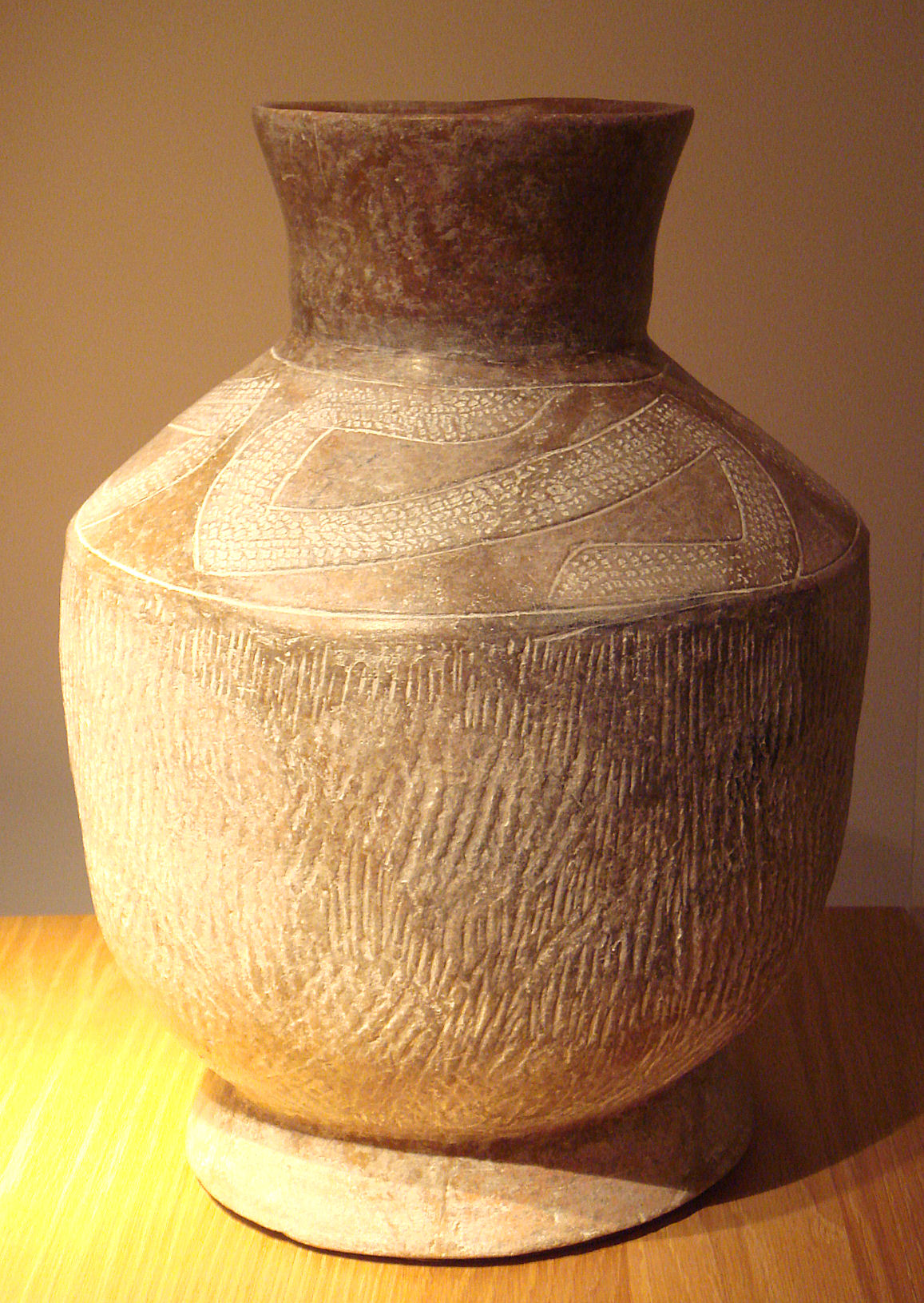
Ceramic, Lopburi, 2300 BCE

=== Dvaravati and Lavo ===
The city has a history dating back to the Dvaravati period more than 1,000 years ago. Karen Mudar's locational study of the moated settlements of the central plain gives the enclosure at Lopburi 137.5 ha and ranks it a regional centre, the second of four administrative levels; the region she assigns to it holds fourteen moated settlements, more than any of the other six. It also has the widest span of control in her sample, the capital's area standing to the summed area of the settlements under it at about one to four against about one to one west and north of the bay, a difference she attributed to different ways of raising grain rather than to different degrees of authority. Between Lopburi and the regional centre at Pra Rot lies a gap of 130 km, and halfway along it the settlement of Utapao, which grew from 15.3 to 83 ha; Mudar suggested it may have been a regional centre in its own right that was later absorbed, and that dating its moat expansion against the growth of the two capitals would settle the question. Epigraphic evidence indicates that the dominant population of the city was Mon. Baker and Pasuk enter a caution about the site itself, holding Lopburi to be probably the Lavapura of the inscriptions but its early form obscured by later building.

The chronicle tradition gives the town a foundation in the seventh century. According to the Northern Chronicles, Lavo was founded by Phraya Kalavarnadishraj, who came from Takkasila in 648 CE. Thai records make his father Phraya Kakabatr, also of Takkasila, which has been taken to be either Tak or Nakhon Chai Si, the setter of the Chula Sakarat era in 638 CE, which the Siamese and the Burmese used until the 19th century; the son is said to have founded the city a decade later.

=== Angkorian period ===
Lavapura became one of the most important centres in the Chao Phraya basin. Inscriptions record that it was incorporated into the administrative structure of the Khmer Empire during the reign of Suryavarman I, which gave the empire access to the trade passing through the Kra Isthmus. There is some evidence that the empire under Suryavarman II fought the Mon over suzerainty in the 12th century. Lopburi sent embassies to China in 1115 and 1155. Baker and Pasuk set out the reading those missions have been given, that Lavo was under Angkorian control from the 10th to the 13th centuries but sent missions of its own whenever Angkor was occupied with succession disputes, and finally broke free before 1289; they judge it more likely that the relationship was always somewhat flexible.

=== Ayutthaya period ===
After the foundation of the Ayutthaya Kingdom in the 14th century, Lopburi was a stronghold of Ayutthaya's rulers. It became the capital of the kingdom during the reign of King Narai the Great in the mid-17th century, and the king resided there about eight months a year.

== Geography ==
Lopburi lies on the Lopburi River at an elevation of 20 metres (66 ft) mostly surrounded by alluvial plains, although some hills rise to between 300 metres (980 ft) and 600 metres (2,000 ft) to the north-east.

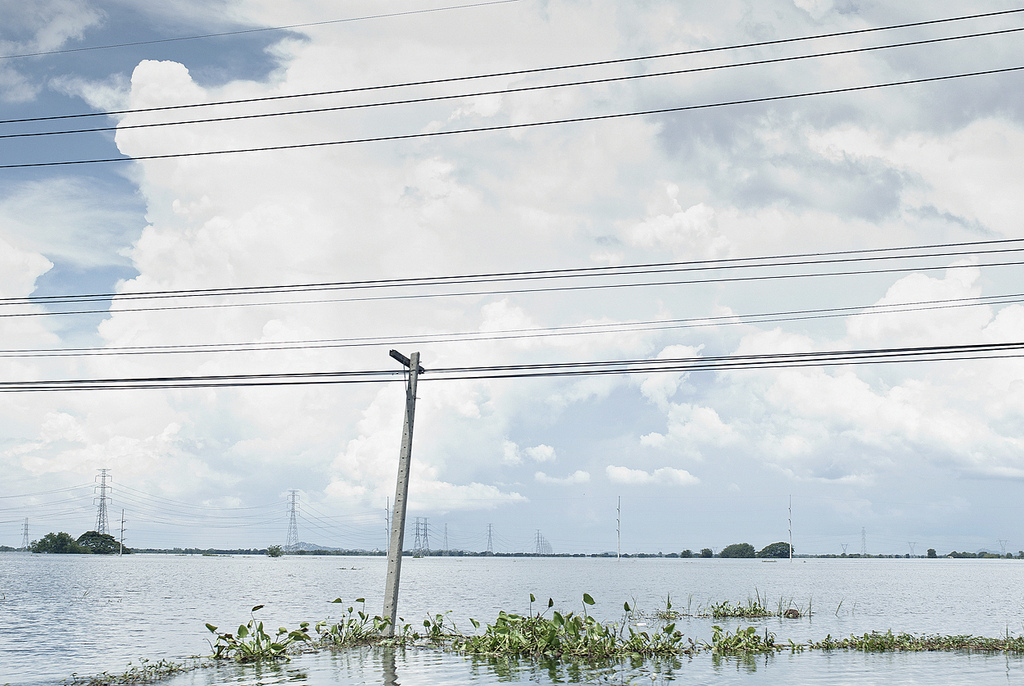
Flood in Lopburi, 2011

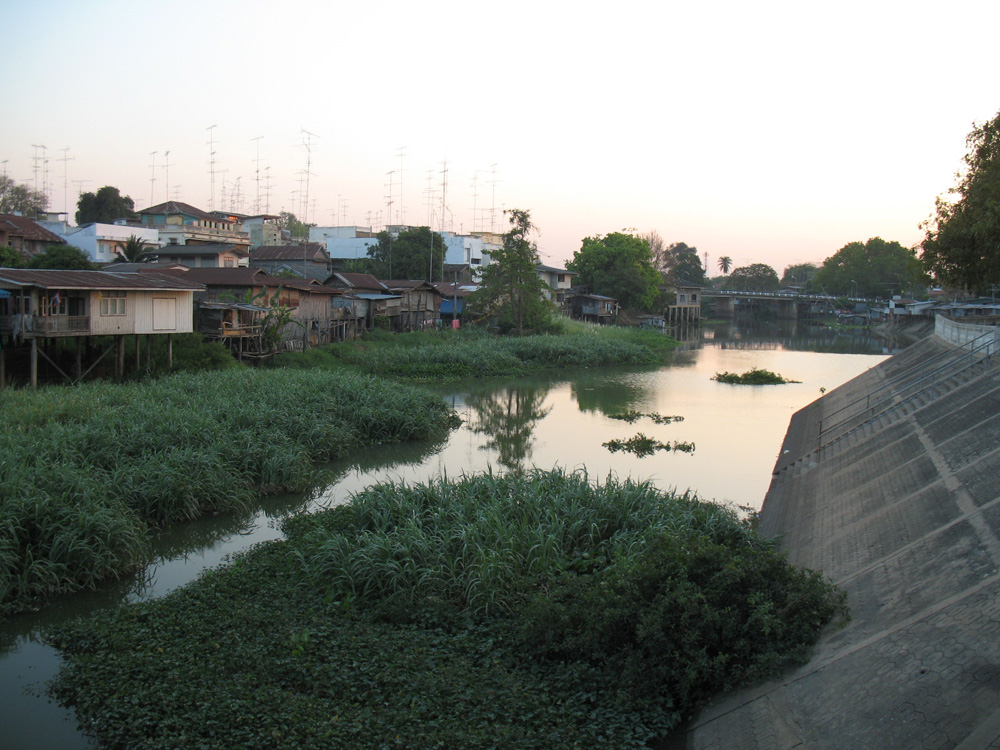
Lopburi River

== Climate ==
Lopburi has a tropical savanna climate (Köppen climate classification Aw). Winters are dry and very warm. Temperatures rise until April, which is very hot with the average daily maximum at 36.8 °C (98.2 °F). The monsoon season runs from late April through October, with heavy rain and somewhat cooler temperatures during the day, although nights remain warm.

Climate data for Lop Buri (1991–2020, extremes 1951-present)
| Month | Jan | Feb | Mar | Apr | May | Jun | Jul | Aug | Sep | Oct | Nov | Dec | Year |
|---|---|---|---|---|---|---|---|---|---|---|---|---|---|
| Record high °C (°F) | 38.4 (101.1) | 38.6 (101.5) | 40.6 (105.1) | 41.8 (107.2) | 41.5 (106.7) | 39.5 (103.1) | 38.3 (100.9) | 37.7 (99.9) | 36.2 (97.2) | 35.6 (96.1) | 35.8 (96.4) | 36.2 (97.2) | 41.8 (107.2) |
| Mean daily maximum °C (°F) | 32.8 (91.0) | 34.4 (93.9) | 35.9 (96.6) | 36.7 (98.1) | 35.7 (96.3) | 34.6 (94.3) | 33.9 (93.0) | 33.5 (92.3) | 33.0 (91.4) | 32.9 (91.2) | 32.8 (91.0) | 32.1 (89.8) | 34.0 (93.2) |
| Daily mean °C (°F) | 26.7 (80.1) | 28.2 (82.8) | 29.7 (85.5) | 30.5 (86.9) | 30.0 (86.0) | 29.3 (84.7) | 28.8 (83.8) | 28.5 (83.3) | 28.2 (82.8) | 28.1 (82.6) | 27.6 (81.7) | 26.4 (79.5) | 28.5 (83.3) |
| Mean daily minimum °C (°F) | 21.7 (71.1) | 23.3 (73.9) | 25.1 (77.2) | 26.0 (78.8) | 26.0 (78.8) | 25.6 (78.1) | 25.3 (77.5) | 25.2 (77.4) | 25.0 (77.0) | 24.7 (76.5) | 23.3 (73.9) | 21.5 (70.7) | 24.4 (75.9) |
| Record low °C (°F) | 8.4 (47.1) | 13.5 (56.3) | 16.4 (61.5) | 19.7 (67.5) | 17.9 (64.2) | 22.2 (72.0) | 21.5 (70.7) | 21.5 (70.7) | 20.5 (68.9) | 17.0 (62.6) | 10.5 (50.9) | 10.2 (50.4) | 8.4 (47.1) |
| Average precipitation mm (inches) | 9.7 (0.38) | 8.7 (0.34) | 36.9 (1.45) | 79.2 (3.12) | 133.3 (5.25) | 113.8 (4.48) | 122.2 (4.81) | 151.5 (5.96) | 266.8 (10.50) | 135.8 (5.35) | 30.1 (1.19) | 7.8 (0.31) | 1,095.8 (43.14) |
| Average precipitation days (≥ 1.0 mm) | 0.7 | 0.8 | 2.4 | 4.4 | 9.7 | 9.3 | 10.7 | 12.4 | 14.4 | 9.8 | 2.3 | 0.8 | 77.7 |
| Average relative humidity (%) | 63.2 | 64.6 | 67.4 | 68.8 | 73.4 | 75.8 | 76.7 | 78.6 | 81.4 | 76.9 | 66.6 | 60.6 | 71.2 |
| Average dew point °C (°F) | 18.5 (65.3) | 20.1 (68.2) | 22.3 (72.1) | 23.6 (74.5) | 24.2 (75.6) | 24.2 (75.6) | 24.0 (75.2) | 24.1 (75.4) | 24.5 (76.1) | 23.3 (73.9) | 20.4 (68.7) | 17.7 (63.9) | 22.2 (72.0) |
| Mean monthly sunshine hours | 263.5 | 245.8 | 238.7 | 240.0 | 155.0 | 114.0 | 117.8 | 117.8 | 108.0 | 182.9 | 219.0 | 260.4 | 2,262.9 |
| Mean daily sunshine hours | 8.5 | 8.7 | 7.7 | 8.0 | 5.0 | 3.8 | 3.8 | 3.8 | 3.6 | 5.9 | 7.3 | 8.4 | 6.2 |
Source 1: World Meteorological Organization
Source 2: Office of Water Management and Hydrology, Royal Irrigation Department (sun 1981–2010)(extremes)

== Ecology ==
Today, the city is best known for the thousands of long-tailed macaques (Macaca fascicularis) that live there, especially around the Khmer temple Prang Sam Yot and the Khmer shrine Sarn Phra Karn. It is suspected that urban expansion caused the monkeys to adapt to city life. They are fed by the local people, especially during the annual Monkey Festival, which usually occurs on the last Sunday of November. The monkeys can be aggressive, are not afraid of humans, and often steal whatever items or food they can find from unwary visitors. Most of the hotels and guesthouses in Lopburi are "monkey-proofed" using screen wire or sealed windows.

In the city, signs are posted, reading:

To prevent monkeys attacking people, the officer will feed monkeys in 3 designated areas outside San Phrakan twice a day, at 10am and 4pm. Those who want to feed monkeys other than these times, please contact the officer or caretaker

During the 2020–21 COVID-19 pandemic, the lack of tourists prompted hungry monkeys to harass local residents. To address the problem, the government implemented a mass roundup and sterilization program in 2024. Within five months, 1,600 of the estimated 3,000 monkeys had been captured for neutering.

== Military ==
The Royal Thai Army Special Warfare Command, the special forces of the Royal Thai Army, is headquartered at the Khok Kathiam Air Force Base 10 kilometres (6.2 mi) northeast of the Lopburi town.

== Transportation ==
The main road through Lobpuri is Route 1 (Phahonyothin Road), which starts in Bangkok, and continues through Lopburi, Chai Nat, Nakhon Sawan, Kamphaeng Phet, Tak, Lampang, Chiang Rai, and the border with Burma at Mae Sai. Route 311 leads west to Sing Buri, and Route 3196 leads south-west to Ang Thong.

Lopburi railway station is a station of the State Railway of Thailand's Northern Line, forming the end of Bangkok's suburban service. Train service from Bangkok railway station (Hua Lamphong) in Bangkok usually takes about 2 hours. The third class train costs less than $1 and is a great way to experience the local culture and the "Real Thailand".

Lopburi 2 (Tha Wung) railway station opened on 5 December 2025 and serves rapid and express trains travelling on the Northern Line. Commuter and ordinary trains still operate at the former station.

Lopburi had a short-lived tramway system, operating between 1955-1962. It was the only provincial tramway system outside Bangkok.

== Notable personalities ==
- Jessica Amornkuldilok, first winner of Asia's Next Top Model
