= Ban Pa Wai railway station =

Railway station in Pa Tan, Thailand

Ban Pa Wai บ้านป่าหวาย
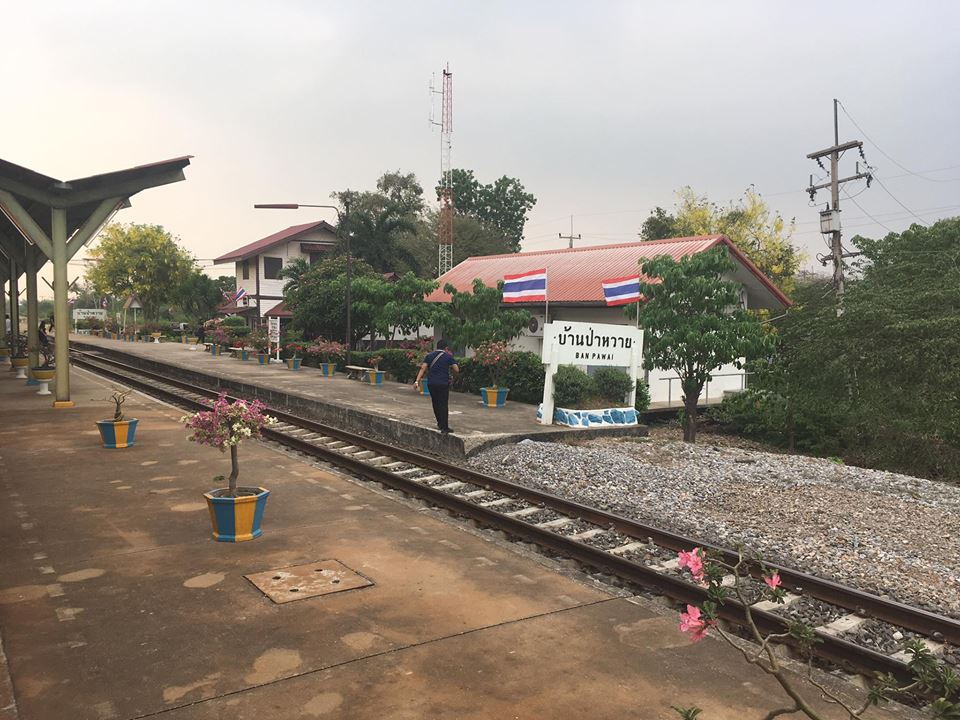
- Ban Pa Wai railway station in 2017

General information
- Location: Pa Tan Subdistrict, Lopburi City; Thailand
- Coordinates: 14.7596°N 100.6434°E
- Owner: State Railway of Thailand
- Line: Northern Line
- Platforms: 3
- Tracks: 3

Other information
- Station code: ปว.

Services
Preceding station	State Railway of Thailand	Following station
Ban Klap Junction towards Hua Lamphong or Krung Thep Aphiwat	Northern Line	Lopburi towards Chiang Mai
Location

Ban Pa Wai station (Thai: สถานีบ้านป่าหวาย) is a railway station in Pa Tan Subdistrict, Lopburi City, Lopburi. It is a class 3 railway station 127.441 km (79.2 mi) from Bangkok railway station. It also serves the Pa Wai Royal Thai Army Special Warfare Command military base.
