= Kaeng Khoi Line =

Railway line in Thailand

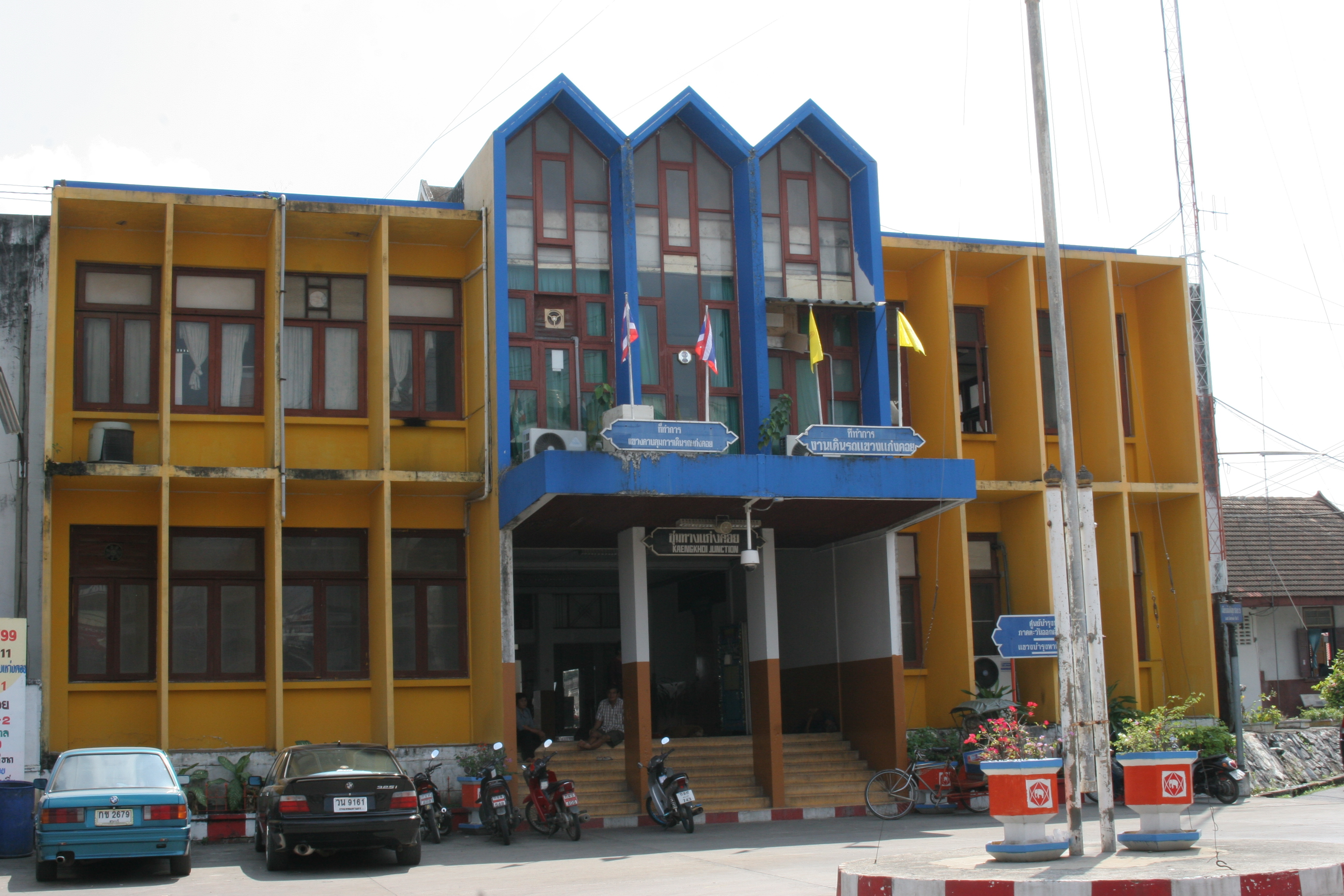
- Kaeng Khoi Junction Railway Station, terminal station of the Kaeng Khoi Line

Overview
- Owner: State Railway of Thailand
- Locale: Bangkok, Pathum Thani, Phra Nakhon Si Ayutthaya, and Saraburi
- Termini: Hua Lamphong; Sara Buri
- Stations: 37

Service
- Type: Commuter rail
- System: Greater Bangkok Commuter rail

Technical
- Line length: 125.10 km (77.73 mi)
- Track gauge: 1,000 mm (3 ft 3 3/8 in) metre gauge

Kaeng Khoi Line is a railway line of Greater Bangkok Commuter rail, operated by State Railway of Thailand (SRT). The line is all double track. There are three commuter train services on the line. Main destinations such as Rangsit, Ayutthaya, Saraburi, and Kaeng Khoi.

== Services ==
- Commuter train no. 339 Bangkok-Kaeng Khoi (diesel multiple unit)
- Commuter train no. 341 Bangkok-Kaeng Khoi

== See also ==
- Greater Bangkok Commuter rail
- Lopburi Line
- Northern Line (Thailand)
- Ubon Ratchathani Main Line
- Nong Khai Main Line
- Kaeng Khoi-Bua Yai Shortcut Main Line
- Northeastern Line (Thailand)
- Kaeng Khoi Junction Railway Station
- SRT Dark Red Line
- Bangkok Elevated Road and Train System (Hopewell)
