= Bang Kham River =

River in Thailand

The Bang Kham River (Thai: แม่น้ำบางขาม, RTGS: Maenam Bang Kham, pronounced [mɛ̂ː.náːm bāːŋ kʰǎːm]) is a short tributary of the Lopburi River. It originates in Ban Mi district, Lopburi Province. It flows southward and tributes the Lopburi River in Tha Wung district. The river is only 20 kilometres (12 mi) long.

There is an Ayutthaya-period temple located on its bank.
