= Tha Khae railway station =

Railway station in Tha Khae, Thailand

Coordinates: 14.8402°N 100.6065°E

Tha Khae ท่าแค

General information
- Location: Ban Tha Khae, Tha Khae Subdistrict, Lop Buri City
- Owner: State Railway of Thailand
- Line: Northern Line
- Platforms: 1
- Tracks: 2

Other information
- Station code: ทแ.

Services
Preceding station	State Railway of Thailand	Following station
Lopburi towards Hua Lamphong or Krung Thep Aphiwat	Northern Line	Khok Kathiam Junction towards Chiang Mai
Location

Tha Khae railway station is a railway station located in Tha Khae Subdistrict, Lop Buri City, Lop Buri. It is located 137.511 km from Bangkok railway station and is a class 3 railway station. It is on the Northern Line of the State Railway of Thailand. The station opened on 31 October 1905 as part of the Northern Line extension from Lop Buri to Pak Nam Pho.
