= Greater Bangkok commuter rail =

Commuter rail system in Thailand

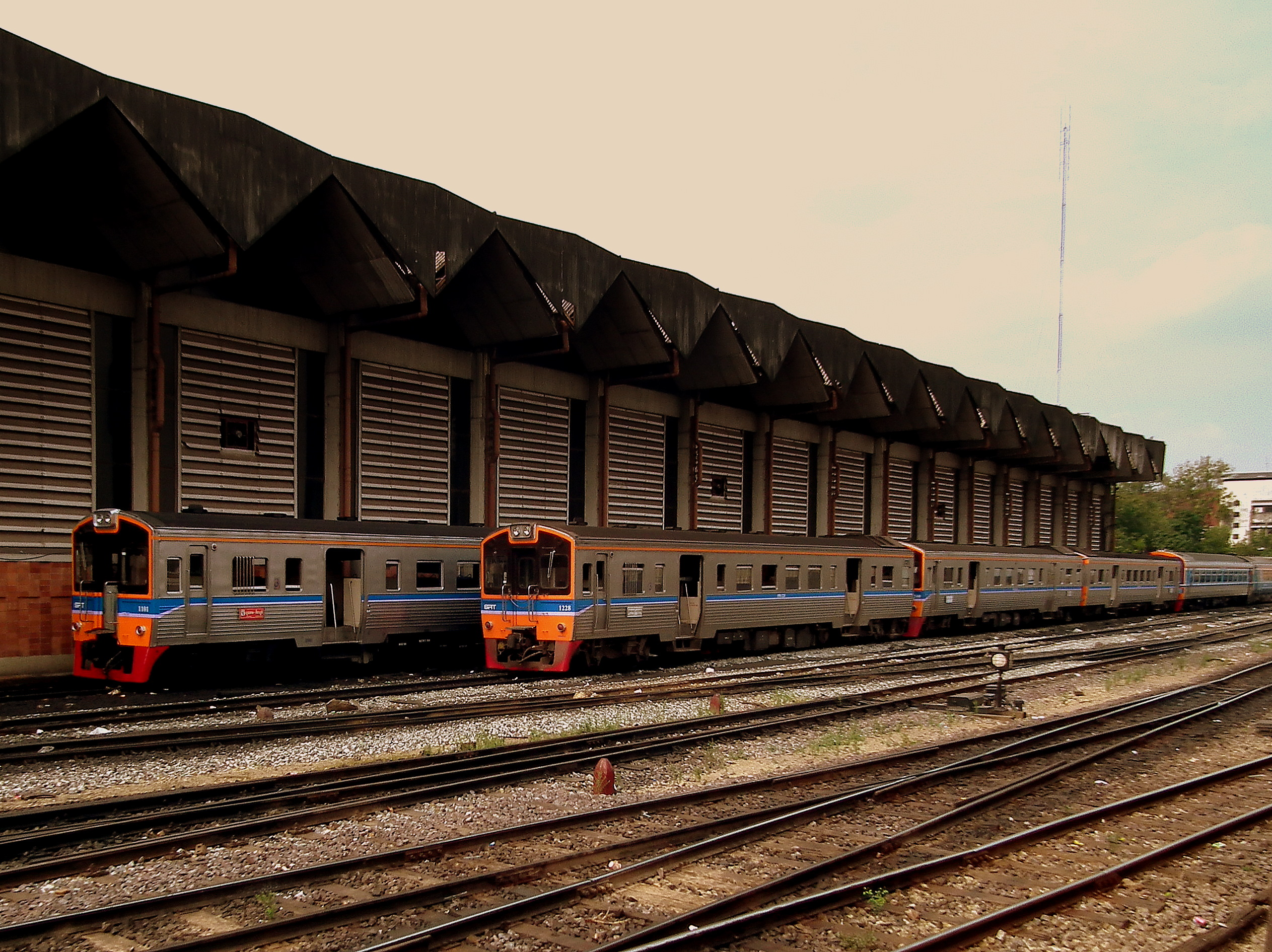
- Commuter rail at Hua Lamphong Railway Station

Overview
- Owner: State Railway of Thailand
- Locale: Bangkok Metropolitan Region and adjacent provinces
- Transit type: Commuter rail
- Number of lines: 5: Lopburi Line; Kaeng Khoi Line; Prachinburi Line; Ratchaburi Line; Suphanburi Line

Operation
- Operator: State Railway of Thailand

Technical
- System length: 623 km (387 mi)
- Track gauge: 1,000 mm (3 ft 3 3/8 in)
- Electrification: None use diesel locomotive or diesel multiple unit

Greater Bangkok commuter rail is a commuter rail system in Bangkok Metropolitan Region, Phra Nakhon Si Ayutthaya Province, Saraburi Province, Lopburi Province, Suphan Buri Province, Ratchaburi Province, Chacheongsao Province, Nakhon Nayok Province, Prachinburi Province, and Samut Songkhram Province. It runs from and to the outskirts of the city during the rush hour, and the passenger number is high. It is operated by State Railway of Thailand (SRT) that also operates inter-city rail. Commuter rail services always have number 3xx. Most of the system are double track.

== Current lines ==
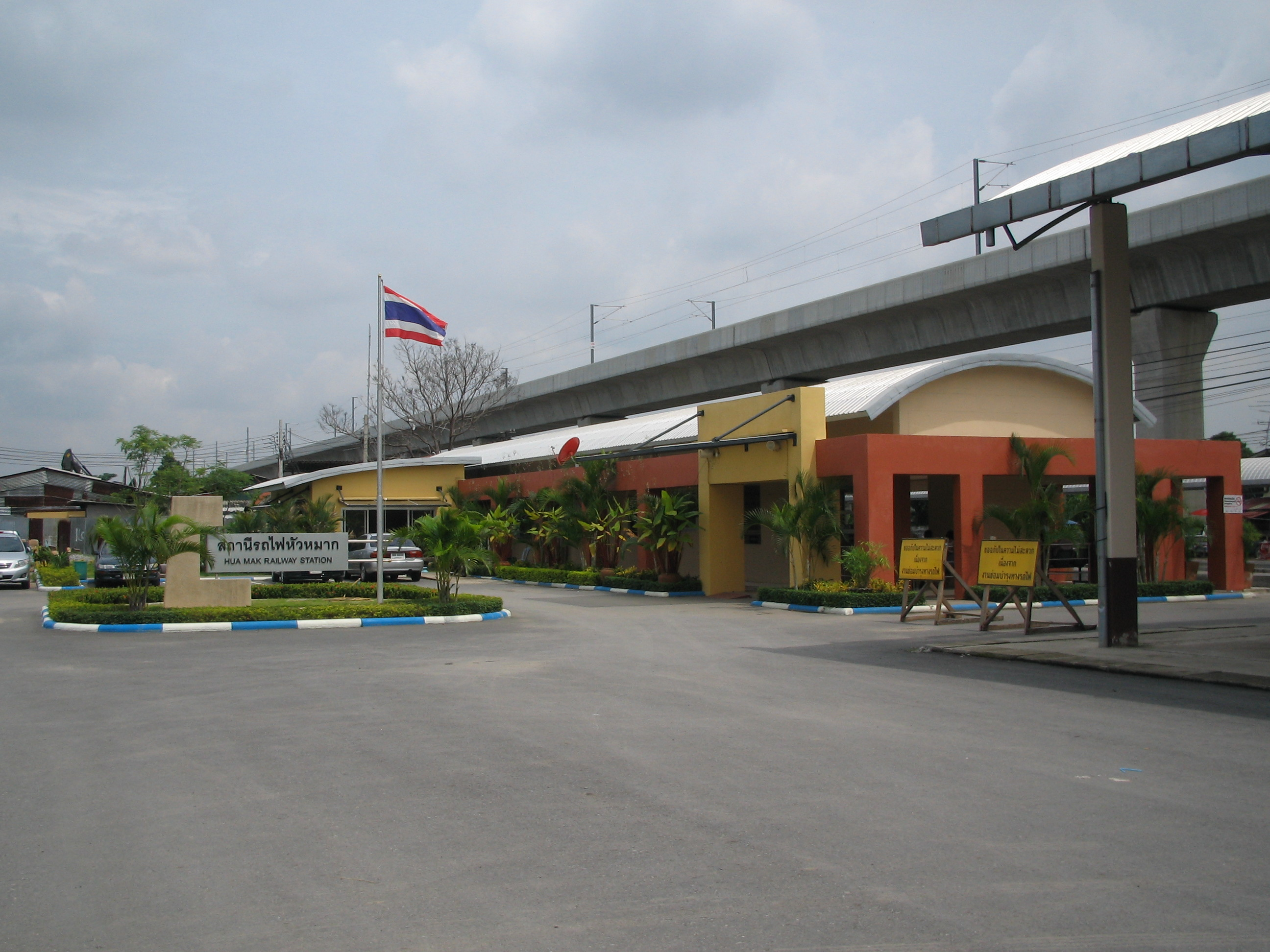
Hua Mak is one of the commuter rail stations that can be interchanged to Airport Rail Link.

| Line | Connection(s) | Length | Terminus | Gauge |
|---|---|---|---|---|
| Lopburi Line | SRT Northern Line; SRT Dark Red Line | 133 km (83 mi) | Hua Lamphong - Lop Buri | 1,000 mm (3 ft 3 3/8 in) |
| Kaeng Khoi Line | SRT Northeastern Line; SRT Dark Red Line | 125 km (78 mi) | Hua Lamphong - Kaeng Khoi | 1,000 mm (3 ft 3 3/8 in) |
| Prachinburi Line | SRT Eastern Line; Airport Rail Link; SRT Light Red Line | 122 km (76 mi) | Hua Lamphong - Prachin Buri | 1,000 mm (3 ft 3 3/8 in) |
| Ratchaburi Line | SRT Southern Line; SRT Light Red Line | 101 km (63 mi) | Thon Buri - Ratchaburi | 1,000 mm (3 ft 3 3/8 in) |
| Suphanburi Line | SRT Southern Line; SRT Light Red Line | 142 km (88 mi) | Hua Lamphong - Suphanburi | 1,000 mm (3 ft 3 3/8 in) |

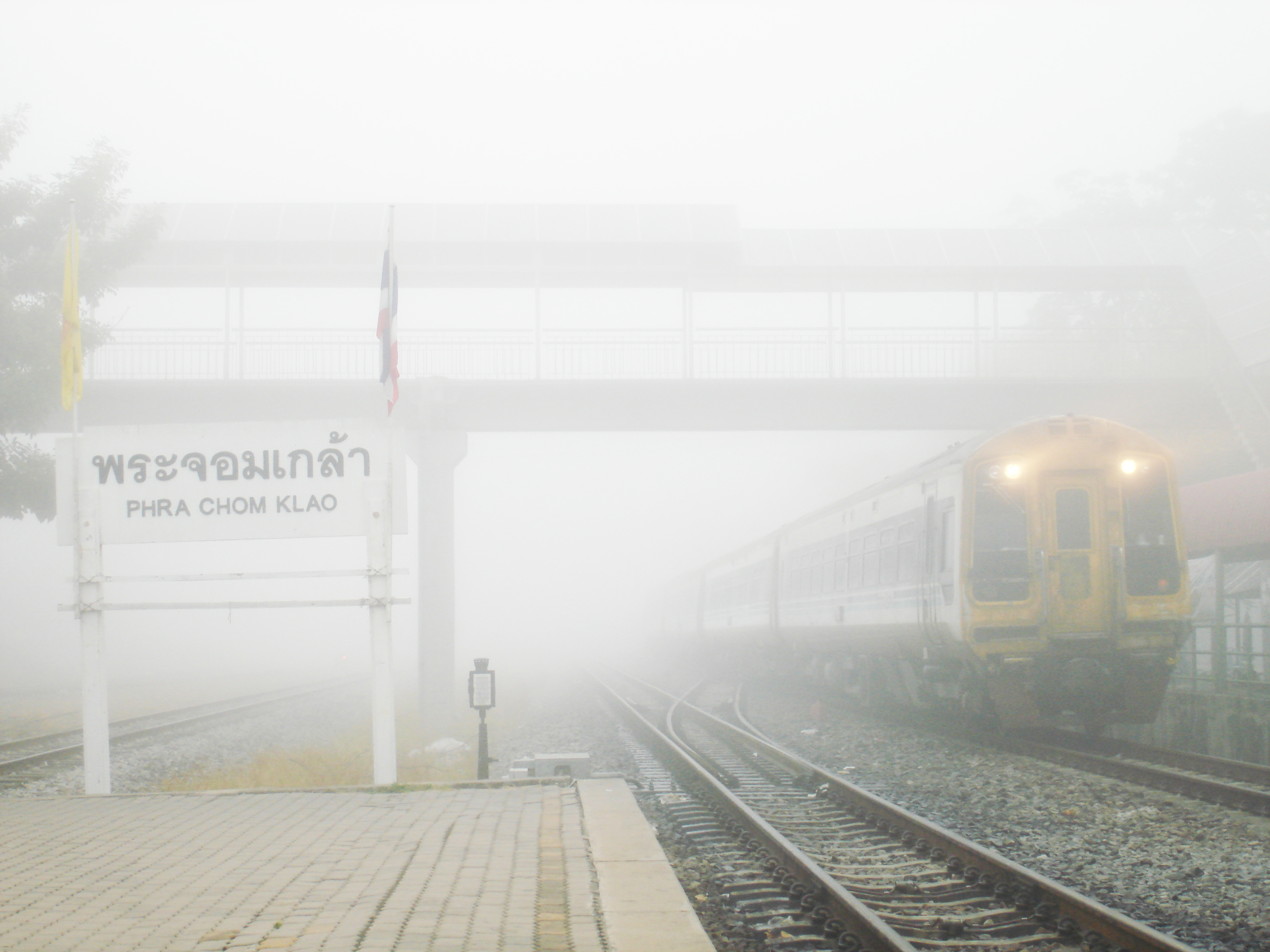
Sprinter as a Hua Lamphong-Chachoengsao Junction Commuter train at Phra Chom Klao Railway Halt in 2008

== Maeklong Railway ==
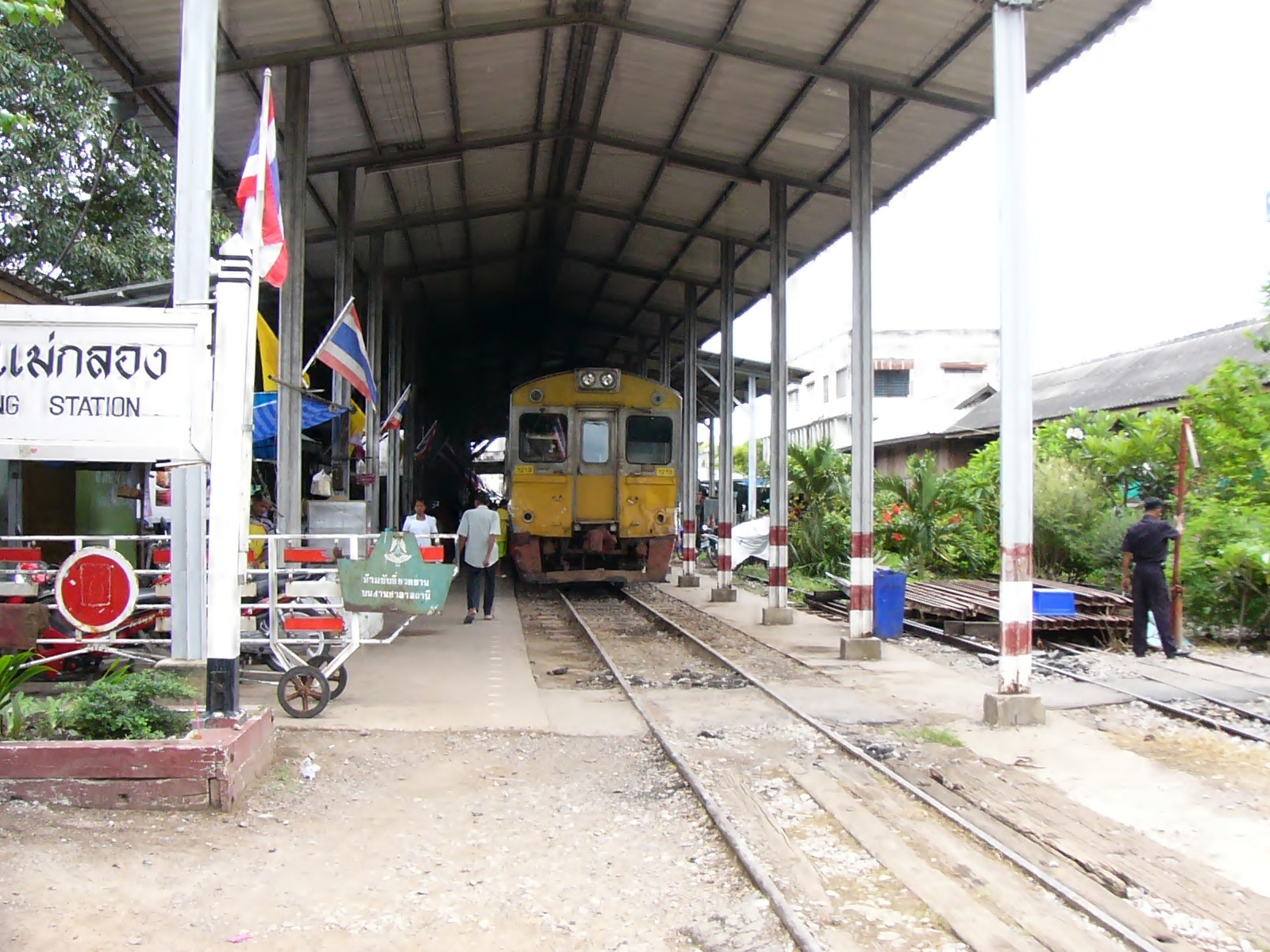
Maeklong railway station, terminal station of Maeklong Railway

The Maeklong Railway (also known as the Mae Klong Railway) is a 1,000 mm (3 ft 3 3/8 in) (Metre gauge) railway that runs for nearly 67 kilometres (42 mi) between Wongwian Yai, Bangkok, and Samut Songkhram in Central Thailand. The line consist of two sections: the eastern Mahachai Line, which runs between Wongwian Yai and Mahachai; and the Ban Laem Line, which runs between Ban Laem and Maeklong. The two stretches are separated by the Tha Chin River at Samut Sakhon. The only way to connect between the stations on the opposite sides of the river is by boat.

== Red Lines Commuter rail ==
The Red Line Mass Transit System Project is a modern commuter rail system to serve the Bangkok Metropolitan Region. Part of the Mass Rapid Transit Master Plan in Bangkok Metropolitan Region, it consists of two lines, the Dark Red Line) running from Thammasat University's Rangsit campus to Maha Chai in Samut Sakhon Province, and the Light Red Line running from Sala Ya in Nakhon Pathom Province to Hua Mak in Bangkok, with both passing through Krung Thep Aphiwat Central Terminal which acts as a connecting hub to the MRT system at Bang Sue. The initial segments of the lines opened in 2021. Most of the railway runs alongside existing national railway tracks, eventually replacing them. Segments running through inner-city areas are elevated, and the system is electrified by overhead lines. The system is owned and is being developed by the State Railway of Thailand. Since the Red Lines run roughly along the alignment of the failed Hopewell Project, they have been described as a "Hopewell revival".

== See also ==
- Mass Rapid Transit Master Plan in Bangkok Metropolitan Region
- List of urban rail systems in Thailand
- MRT (Bangkok)
- BTS Skytrain
- Airport Rail Link (Bangkok)
- SRT Red Lines
