= Khok Kathiam Junction railway station =

Railway station in Thailand

Coordinates: 14.8998°N 100.5934°E

Khok Kathiam Junction ชุมทางโคกกะเทียม
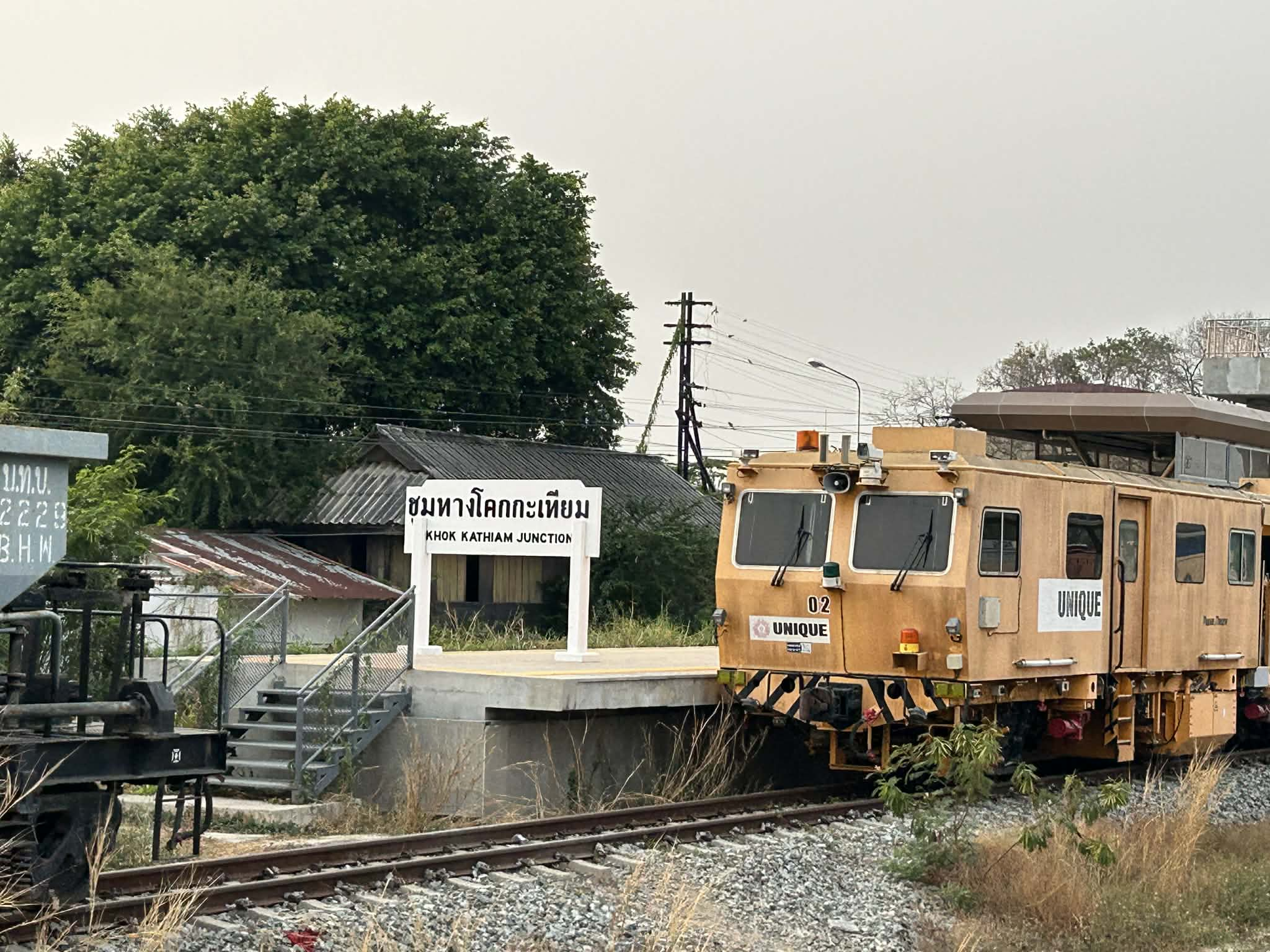
- Khok Kathiam Junction station in 2026.

General information
- Location: Ban Khok Kathiam, Khok Kathiam Subdistrict, Lop Buri City
- Owner: State Railway of Thailand
- Line: Northern Line
- Platforms: 1
- Tracks: 3

Other information
- Station code: คท.

Services
Preceding station	State Railway of Thailand	Following station
Tha Khae towards Hua Lamphong or Krung Thep Aphiwat	Northern Line	Nong Tao towards Chiang Mai
Lopburi 2 (Tha Wung) towards Ban Klap Junction	Northern Line Lopburi Bypass Line	Terminus
Location

Khok Kathiam Junction railway station is a railway station located in Khok Kathiam Subdistrict, Lop Buri City, Lop Buri. It is located 144.238 km from Bangkok railway station and is a class 3 railway station. It is on the Northern Line of the State Railway of Thailand. The station opened on 31 October 1905 as part of the Northern Line extension from Lop Buri to Pak Nam Pho.

Since 5 December 2025, the opening of the Lopburi Bypass Line towards Lopburi 2 (Tha Wung) railway station was opened converting the railway station and changing its official name to " Khok Kathiam Junction".

== See also ==
- Khok Kathiam Airport
