= Tha Wung district =

Tha Wung ท่าวุ้ง
- District
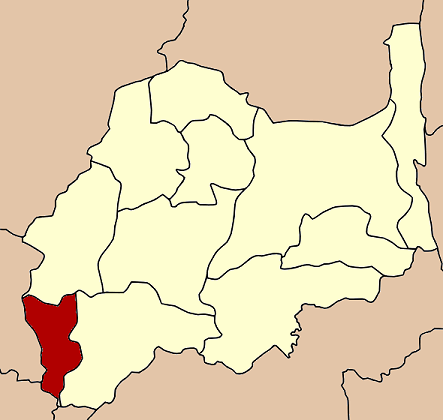
- District location in Lopburi province
- Coordinates: 14°48′54″N 100°30′42″E
- Country: Thailand
- Province: Lopburi

Area
  - Total: 242.8 km^{2} (93.7 sq mi)

Population (2005)
  - Total: 50,687
  - Density: 208.8/km^{2} (541/sq mi)
- Time zone: UTC+7 (ICT)
- Postal code: 15150
- Geocode: 1605

Tha Wung (Thai: ท่าวุ้ง, pronounced [tʰâː wúŋ]) is a district (amphoe) in western part of Lopburi province, central Thailand.

== History ==
The district was created 1912, formerly named Pho Wi.

== Geography ==
The main water resource of Tha Wung are the Lopburi and Bang Kham Rivers.

Neighbouring districts are (from the north clockwise) Ban Mi and Mueang Lopburi of Lopburi Province, Chaiyo of Ang Thong province and Phrom Buri and Mueang Sing Buri of Singburi province.

== Administration ==
The district is divided into 11 sub-districts (tambons), which are further subdivided into 128 villages (mubans). Tha Wung has township (thesaban tambon) status and covers parts of tambon Tha Wung. Tha Khlong is another township which covers parts of tambon Khao Samo Khon. There are 10 tambon administrative organizations (TAO).

No.	Name	Thai name	Villages	Pop.
1.	Tha Wung	ท่าวุ้ง	12	5,253
2.	Bang Khu	บางคู้	15	5,120
3.	Pho Talat Kaeo	โพตลาดแก้ว	10	4,830
4.	Bang Li	บางลี่	16	5,312
5.	Bang Nga	บางงา	13	4,771
6.	Khok Salut	โคกสลุด	7	2,008
7.	Khao Samo Khon	เขาสมอคอน	13	7,015
8.	Hua Samrong	หัวสำโรง	15	6,927
9.	Lat Sali	ลาดสาลี่	7	1,538
10.	Ban Boek	บ้านเบิก	11	5,431
11.	Mutchalin	มุจลินท์	9	2,482
