= Ban Klap Junction railway station =

Railway station in Ban Klap, Thailand

Ban Klap Junction ชุมทางบ้านกลับ
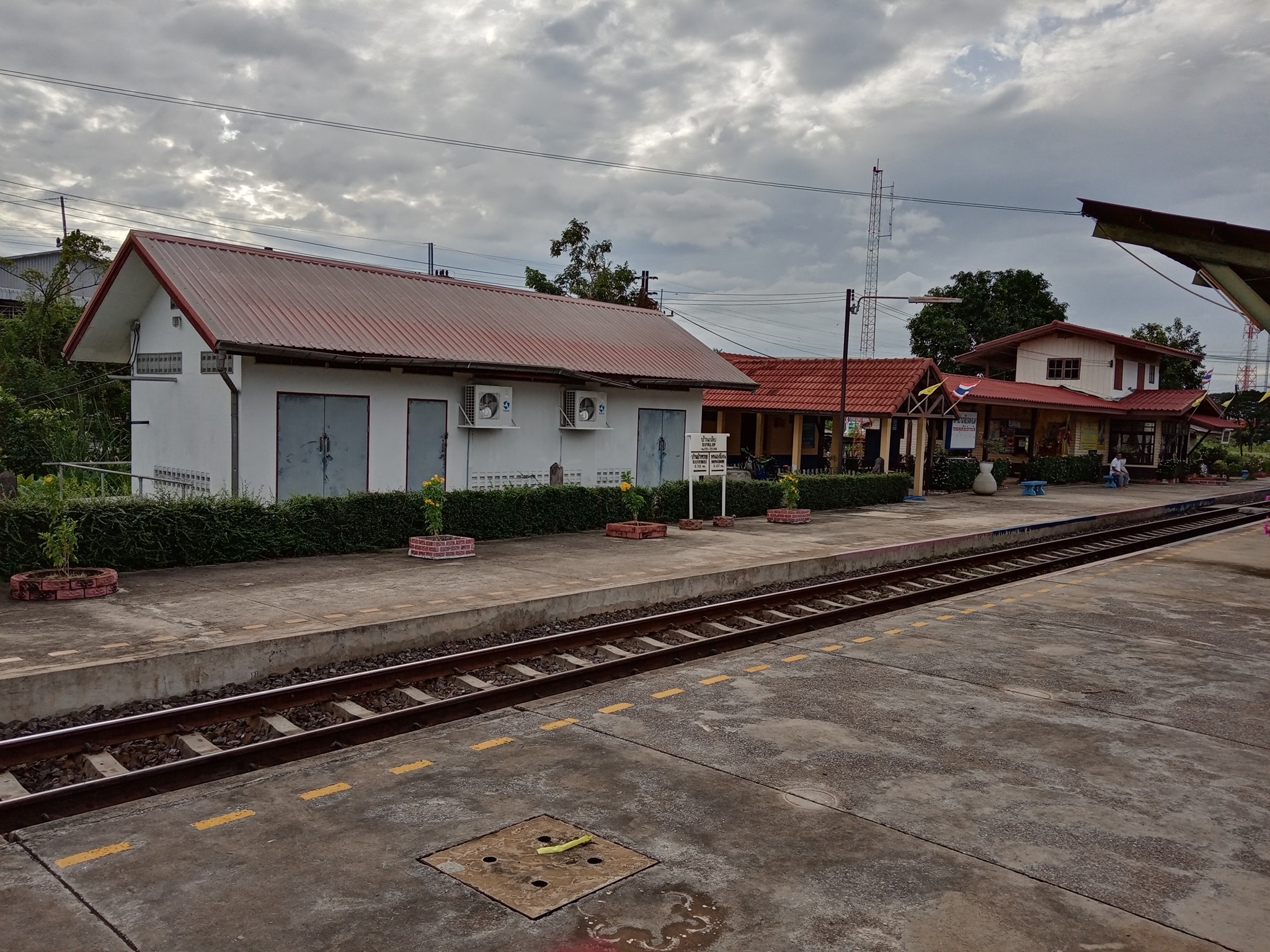

General information
- Location: Ban Klap Subdistrict, Nong Don District, Saraburi
- Coordinates: 14°43′14″N 100°40′42″E
- Owner: State Railway of Thailand
- Lines: Chiang Mai Main Line; Lopburi Bypass Line
- Platforms: 3
- Tracks: 3

Other information
- Station code: บก.

Services
| Preceding station | State Railway of Thailand | Following station |
|---|---|---|
| Nong Don towards Hua Lamphong or Krung Thep Aphiwat | Northern Line | Ban Pa Wai towards Chiang Mai |
| Terminus | Northern Line Lopburi Bypass Line | Lopburi 2 (Tha Wung) towards Khok Kathiam Junction |
Location

Ban Klap Junction station (Thai: สถานีชุมทางบ้านกลับ) is a railway station located in Ban Klap Subdistrict, Nong Don District, Saraburi. It is a class 3 railway station located 121.723 km (75.6 mi) from Bangkok railway station.

Since 5 December 2025, the opening of the Lopburi Bypass Line towards Lopburi 2 (Tha Wung) railway station was opened converting the railway station and changing its official name to "Ban Klap Junction".
