= Lopburi railway station =

Railway station in Thailand

Coordinates: 14°47′55″N 100°36′55″E

Lopburi ลพบุรี
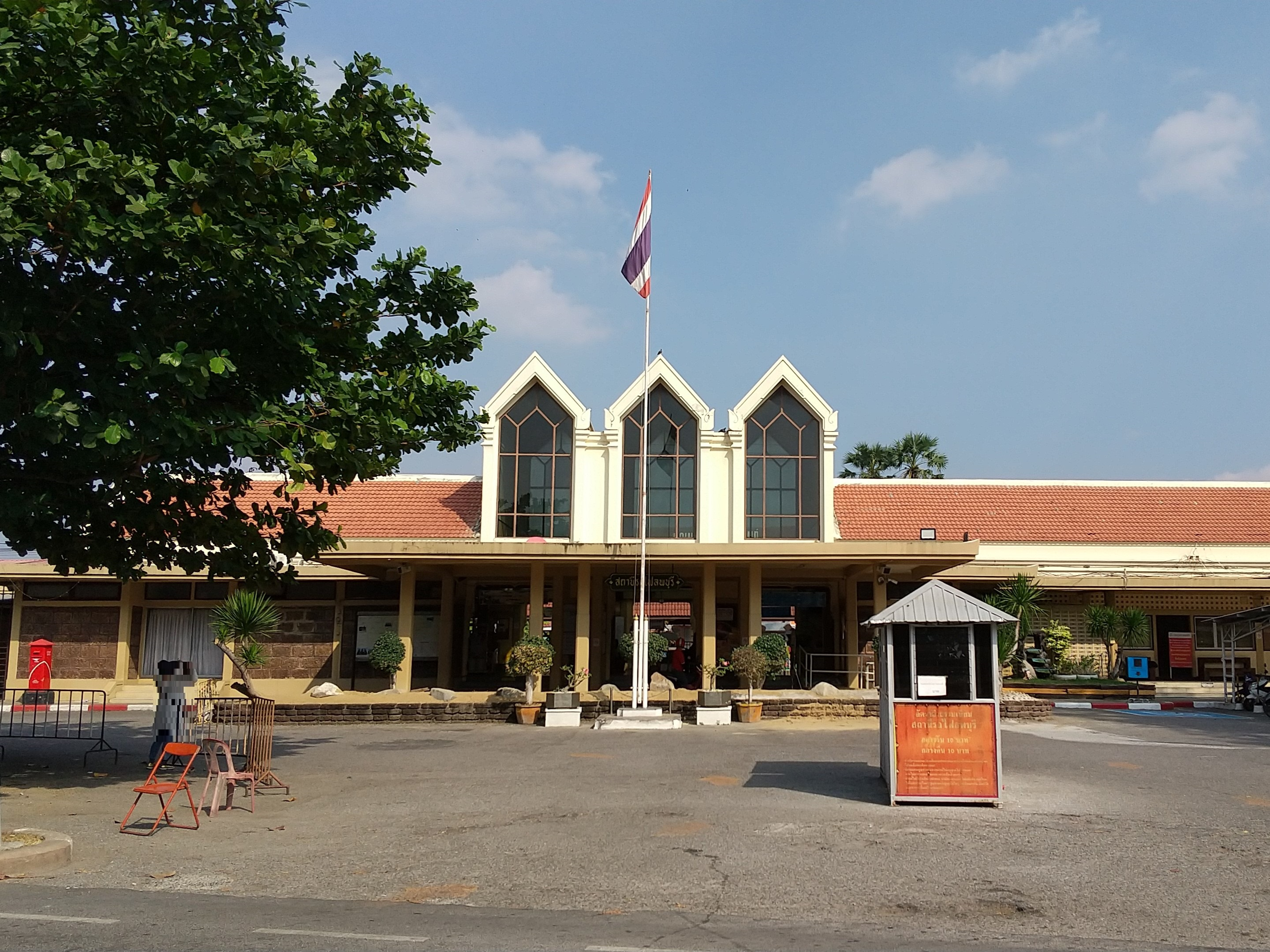

General information
- Location: Tha Hin Subdistrict, Lopburi; Lopburi Province; Thailand
- Operator: State Railway of Thailand
- Manager: Ministry of Transport
- Line: Chiang Mai Main Line
- Platforms: 3
- Tracks: 6

Construction
- Structure type: At-grade
- Parking: Yes
- Accessible: Yes

Other information
- Station code: ลบ.
- Classification: Class 1

Services
| Preceding station | State Railway of Thailand | Following station |
|---|---|---|
| Ban Pa Wai towards Hua Lamphong or Krung Thep Aphiwat | Northern Line | Tha Khae towards Chiang Mai |
Location

Lopburi railway station is a class 1 railway station in the centre of Lopburi, Thailand, located 133 km (83 mi) away from Bangkok Station. It is a terminus for commuter train services on the Northern Line. Two large golden monkey sculptures are located on the platforms as the monkey is the symbol of Lopburi. The opposite side of the station building is an important archaeological site of Lopburi, Wat Phra Sri Rattana Mahathat.

Lopburi is the current northern end of the double-track section from Bangkok and further double tracking on the line has begun construction between Lopburi – Pak Nam Pho. However, to the north of the station where the tracks run adjacent to the Phra Prang Sam Yot, the double tracking was not possible due to the predicted detrimental effects of increased rail traffic on the historical site. As a result, a bypass route was constructed between Ban Klap and Khok Kathiam railway stations, with a new station built on this line to serve long-distance rapid and express services.

On 5 December 2025, Lopburi 2 (Tha Wung) railway station was opened and rapid and express services were transferred to operate at the new station, while this station currently serves only local and commuter services as far as Phitsanulok. A free bus service operated by SRT connects the two stations.

== Gallery ==
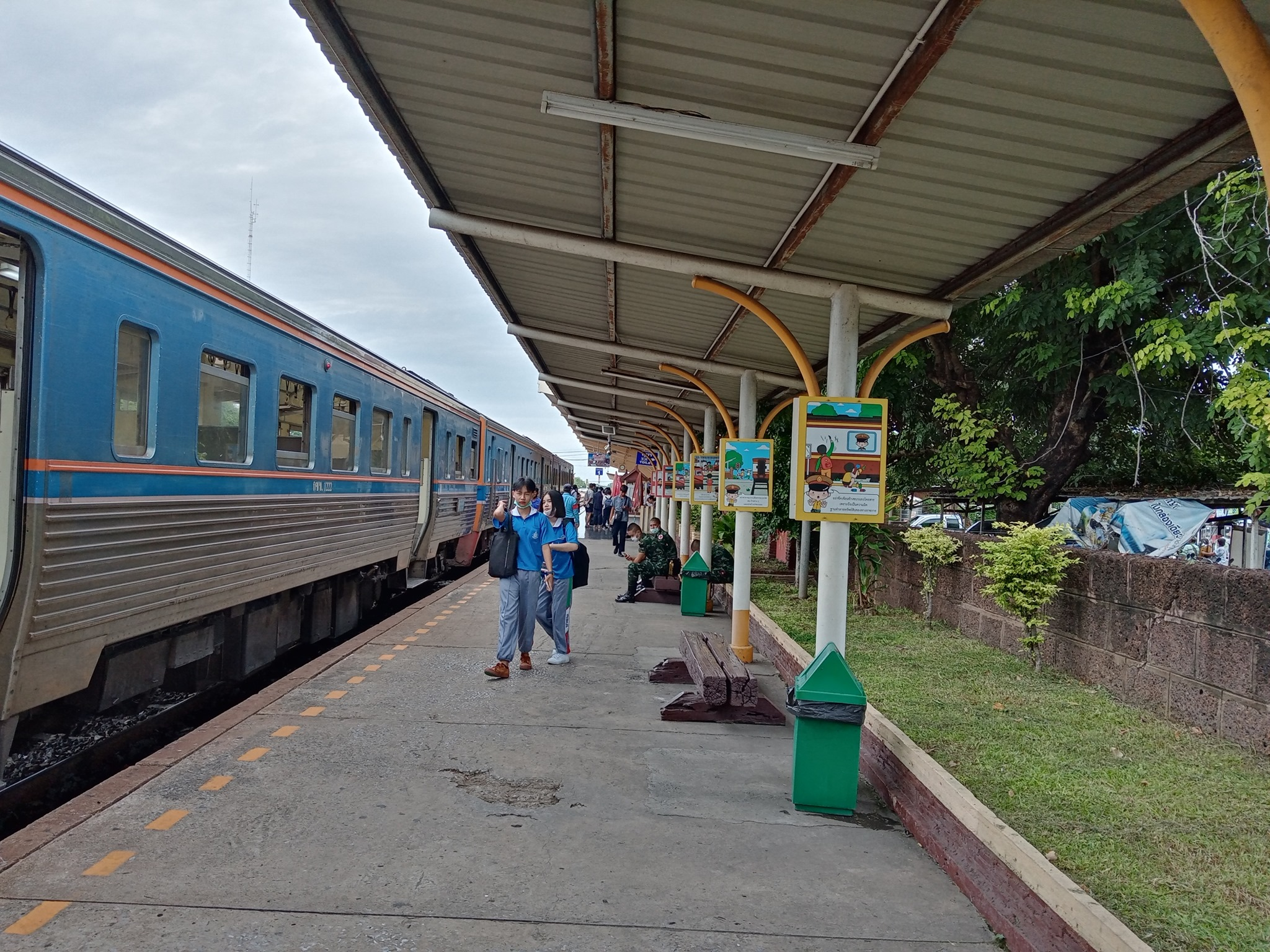
Station platform

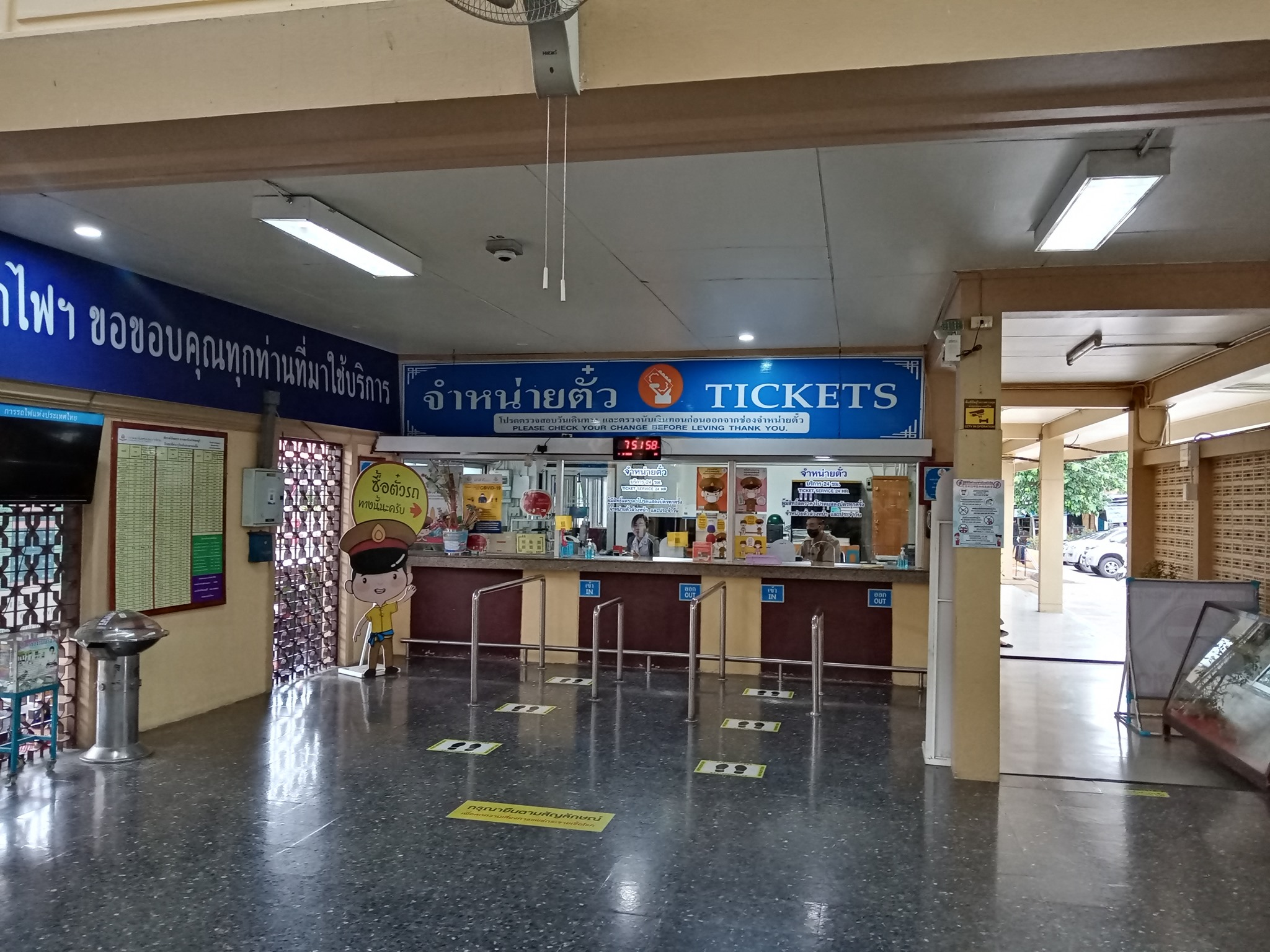
Ticket counter

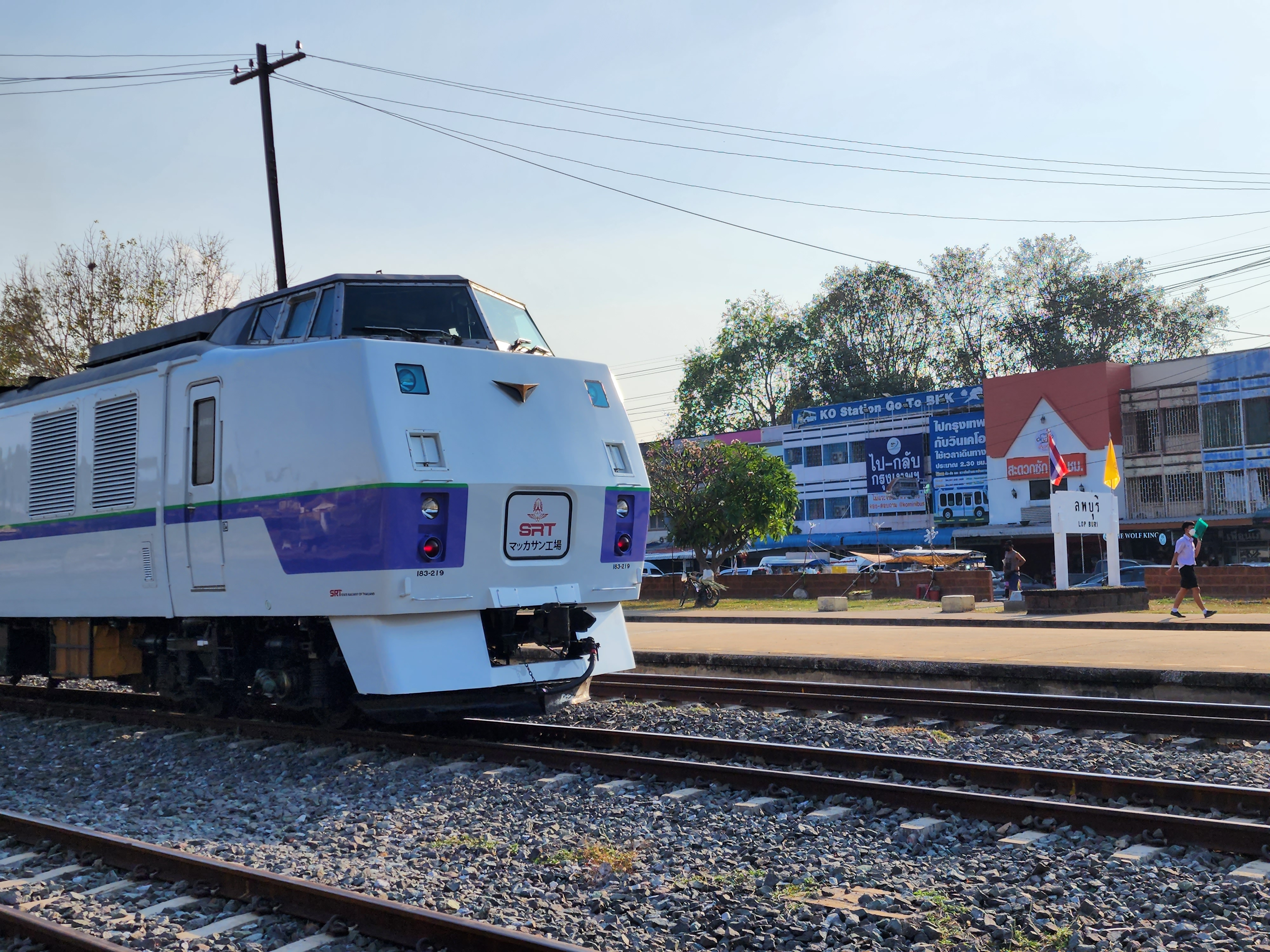
KiHa 183 at Lopburi Station

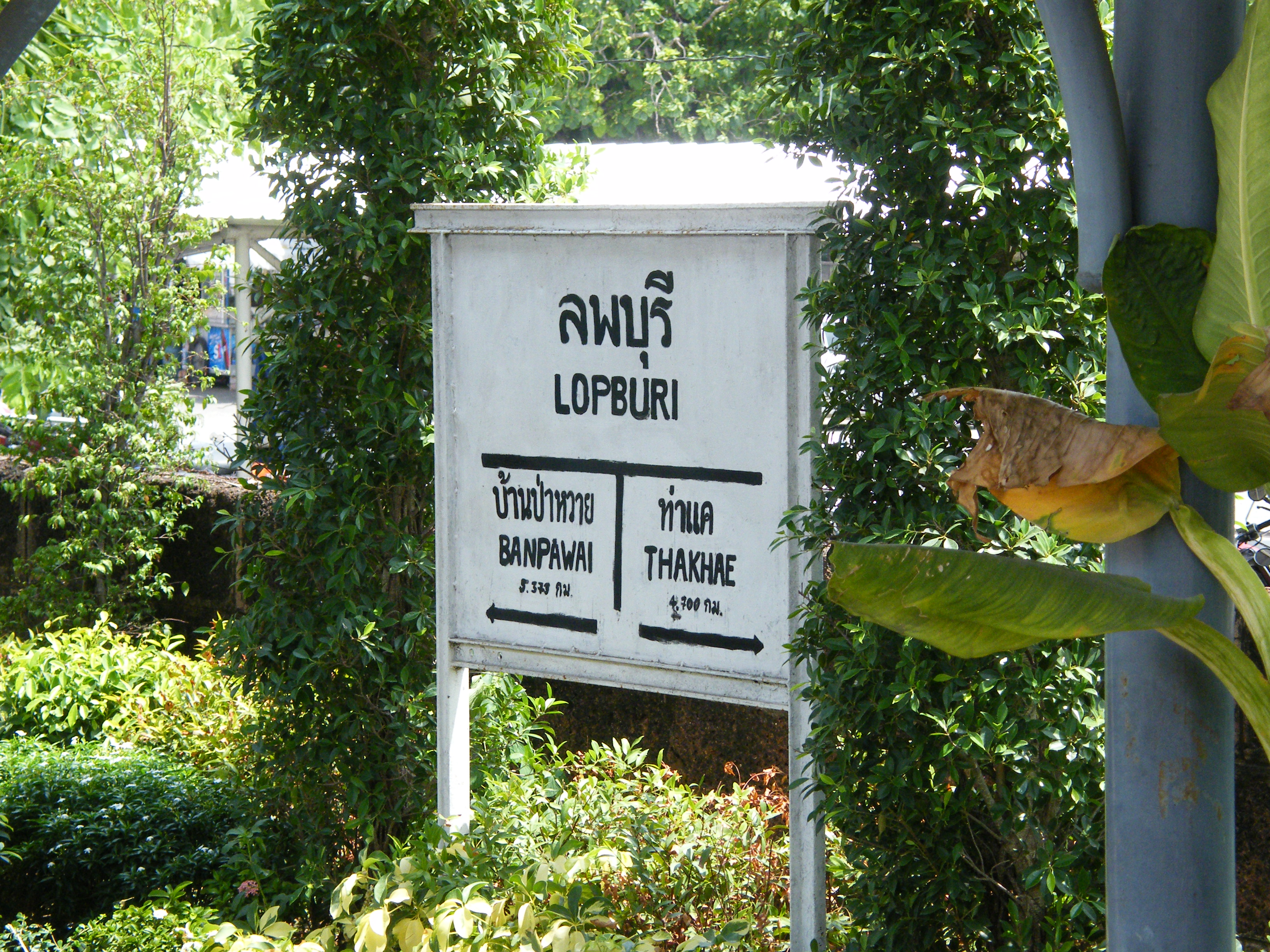
Station sign

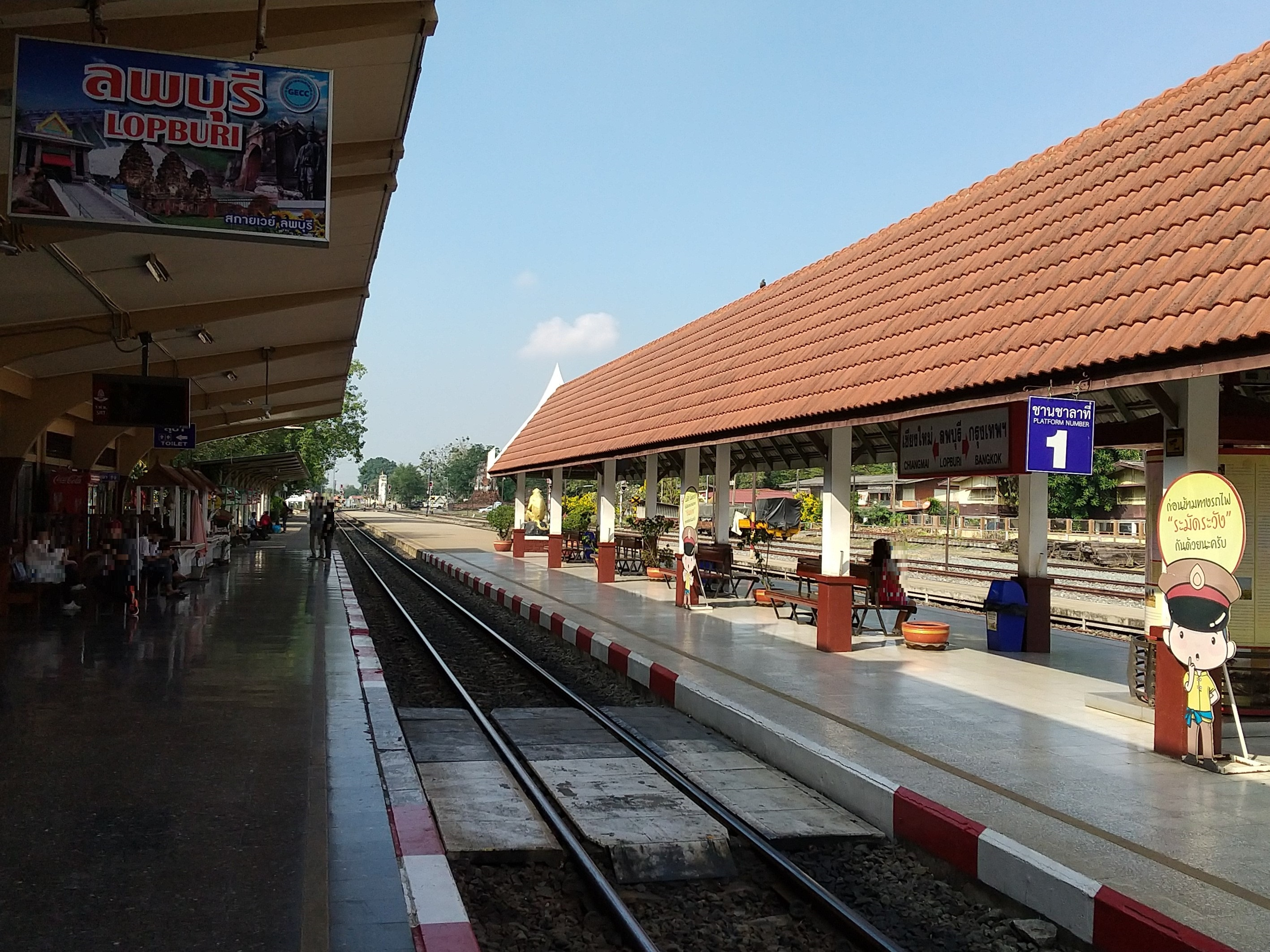
Platforms
