= Ban Mi district =

Ban Mi บ้านหมี่
- District
- District location in Lopburi province
- Coordinates: 15°2′41″N 100°32′13″E
- Country: Thailand
- Province: Lopburi
- Seat: Ban Mi
- Tambon: 22
- Muban: 157

Area
  - Total: 585.7 km^{2} (226.1 sq mi)

Population (2014)
  - Total: 77,005
  - Density: 146.9/km^{2} (380/sq mi)
- Time zone: UTC+7 (ICT)
- Postal code: 15110
- Geocode: 1606
- Website: http://www.banmi.go.th/

Ban Mi (Thai: บ้านหมี่, pronounced [bâːn mìː]) is a district (amphoe) in the western part of Lopburi province, central Thailand.

== History ==
The district was created in 1883, then named Sanam Chaeng. When the district office was moved to Ban Huai Kaeo, the district name was changed to Huai Kaeo as well. When in 1898 the Thai government built the Northern Railway through the district, the district center was moved to Ban Sao (Thai บ้านเซ่า) and the district name was changed back to Sanam Chaeng. In 1917 it was renamed Ban Sao as the name of the tambon of the district center. Finally the Thai government changed the name to Ban Mi in 1939.

The name Ban Mi is the name of an old town of Phuan people who migrated from Laos to Siam around 1870. The name originates from a hand weaving method to weave cotton or silk fabric, named Mat Mi (มัดหมี่) in Thai.

== Geography ==
Neighboring districts are (from the northeast clockwise) Nong Muang, Khok Samrong, Mueang Lop Buri, Tha Wung of Lopburi, In Buri of Singburi province, and Takhli of Nakhon Sawan province.

The water resources of Ban Mi are the Bang Kham River and Khlong Anusasanan.

== Administration ==
=== Central administration ===
Ban Mi is divided into 22 sub-districts (tambons), which are further subdivided into 157 administrative villages (mubans).

No.	Name	Thai	Villages	Pop.
1.	Phai Yai	ไผ่ใหญ่	6	2,604
2.	Ban Sai	บ้านทราย	6	3,359
3.	Ban Kluai	บ้านกล้วย	5	2,551
4.	Dong Phlap	ดงพลับ	5	1,788
5.	Ban Chi	บ้านชี	12	5,422
6.	Phu Kha	พุคา	4	2,387
7.	Hin Pak	หินปัก	10	3,390
8.	Bang Phueng	บางพึ่ง	9	5,083
9.	Nong Sai Khao	หนองทรายขาว	7	2,949
10.	Bang Kaphi	บางกะพี้	7	1,855
11.	Nong Tao	หนองเต่า	8	4,155
12.	Phon Thong	โพนทอง	7	4,850
13.	Bang Kham	บางขาม	7	2,691
14.	Don Dueng	ดอนดึง	8	4,308
15.	Chon Muang	ชอนม่วง	6	3,057
16.	Nong Krabian	หนองกระเบียน	9	3,331
17.	Sai Huai Kaeo	สายห้วยแก้ว	7	3,100
18.	Maha Son	มหาสอน	8	3,409
19.	Ban Mi	บ้านหมี่	-	3,503
20.	Chiang Nga	เชียงงา	10	3,145
21.	Nong Mueang	หนองเมือง	7	4,188
22.	Sanam Chaeng	สนามแจง	9	5,880

=== Local administration ===
There is one town (thesaban mueang) in the district:

- Ban Mi (Thai: เทศบาลเมืองบ้านหมี่) consisting of the sub-district Ban Mi.

There are 20 subdistrict administrative organizations (SAO) in the district:

- Phai Yai (Thai: องค์การบริหารส่วนตำบลไผ่ใหญ่) consisting of sub-district Phai Yai.
- Ban Sai (Thai: องค์การบริหารส่วนตำบลบ้านทราย) consisting of sub-district Ban Sai.
- Ban Kluai (Thai: องค์การบริหารส่วนตำบลบ้านกล้วย) consisting of sub-district Ban Kluai.
- Ban Chi (Thai: องค์การบริหารส่วนตำบลบ้านชี) consisting of sub-district Ban Chi.
- Phu Kha (Thai: องค์การบริหารส่วนตำบลพุคา) consisting of sub-district Phu Kha.
- Hin Pak (Thai: องค์การบริหารส่วนตำบลหินปัก) consisting of sub-district Hin Pak.
- Bang Phueng (Thai: องค์การบริหารส่วนตำบลบางพึ่ง) consisting of sub-district Bang Phueng.
- Nong Sai Khao (Thai: องค์การบริหารส่วนตำบลหนองทรายขาว) consisting of sub-district Nong Sai Khao.
- Bang Kaphi Dong Phlap (Thai: องค์การบริหารส่วนตำบลบางกะพี้ดงพลับ) consisting of sub-districts Bang Kaphi and Dong Phlap.
- Nong Tao (Thai: องค์การบริหารส่วนตำบลหนองเต่า) consisting of sub-district Nong Tao.
- Phon Thong (Thai: องค์การบริหารส่วนตำบลโพนทอง) consisting of sub-district Phon Thong.
- Bang Kham (Thai: องค์การบริหารส่วนตำบลบางขาม) consisting of sub-district Bang Kham.
- Don Dueng (Thai: องค์การบริหารส่วนตำบลดอนดึง) consisting of sub-district Don Dueng.
- Chon Muang (Thai: องค์การบริหารส่วนตำบลชอนม่วง) consisting of sub-district Chon Muang.
- Nong Krabian (Thai: องค์การบริหารส่วนตำบลหนองกระเบียน) consisting of sub-district Nong Krabian.
- Sai Huai Kaeo (Thai: องค์การบริหารส่วนตำบลสายห้วยแก้ว) consisting of sub-district Sai Huai Kaeo.
- Maha Son (Thai: องค์การบริหารส่วนตำบลมหาสอน) consisting of sub-district Maha Son.
- Chiang Nga (Thai: องค์การบริหารส่วนตำบลเชียงงา) consisting of sub-district Chiang Nga.
- Nong Mueang (Thai: องค์การบริหารส่วนตำบลหนองเมือง) consisting of sub-district Nong Mueang.
- Sanam Chaeng (Thai: องค์การบริหารส่วนตำบลสนามแจง) consisting of sub-district Sanam Chaeng.
