= Lopburi province =

Province of Thailand

Coordinates: 14°48′2″N 100°39′5″E

Lopburi ลพบุรี
- Province
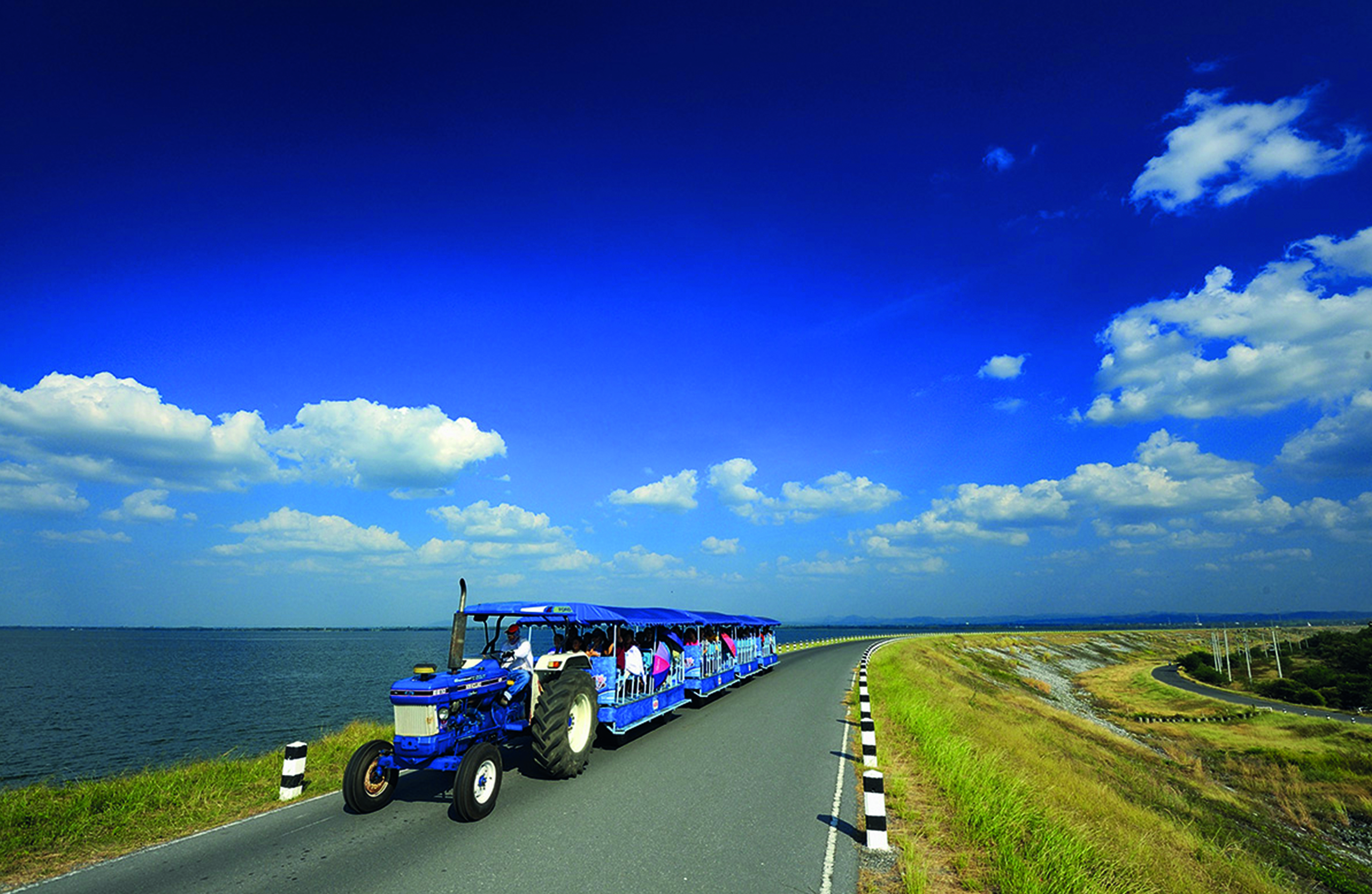
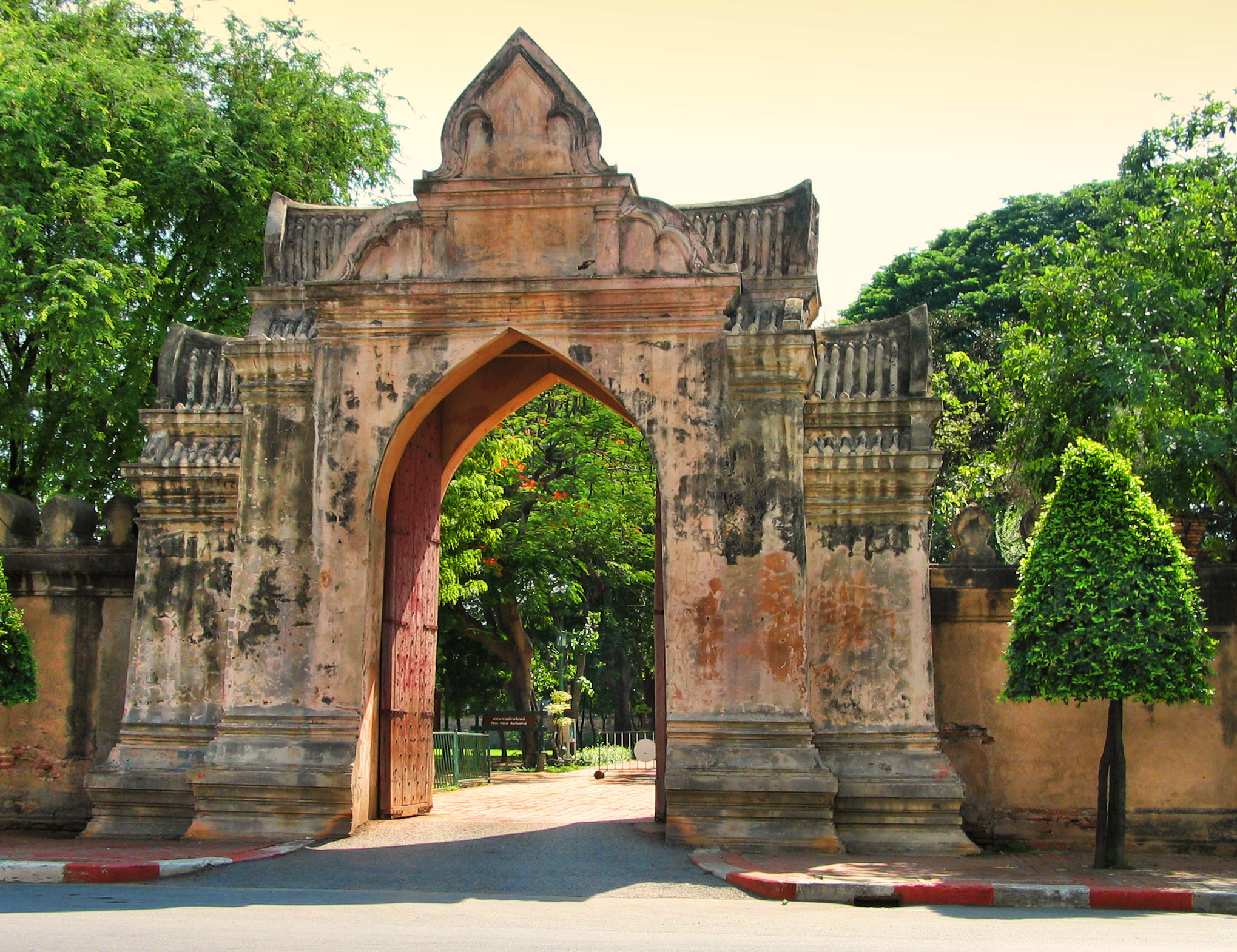
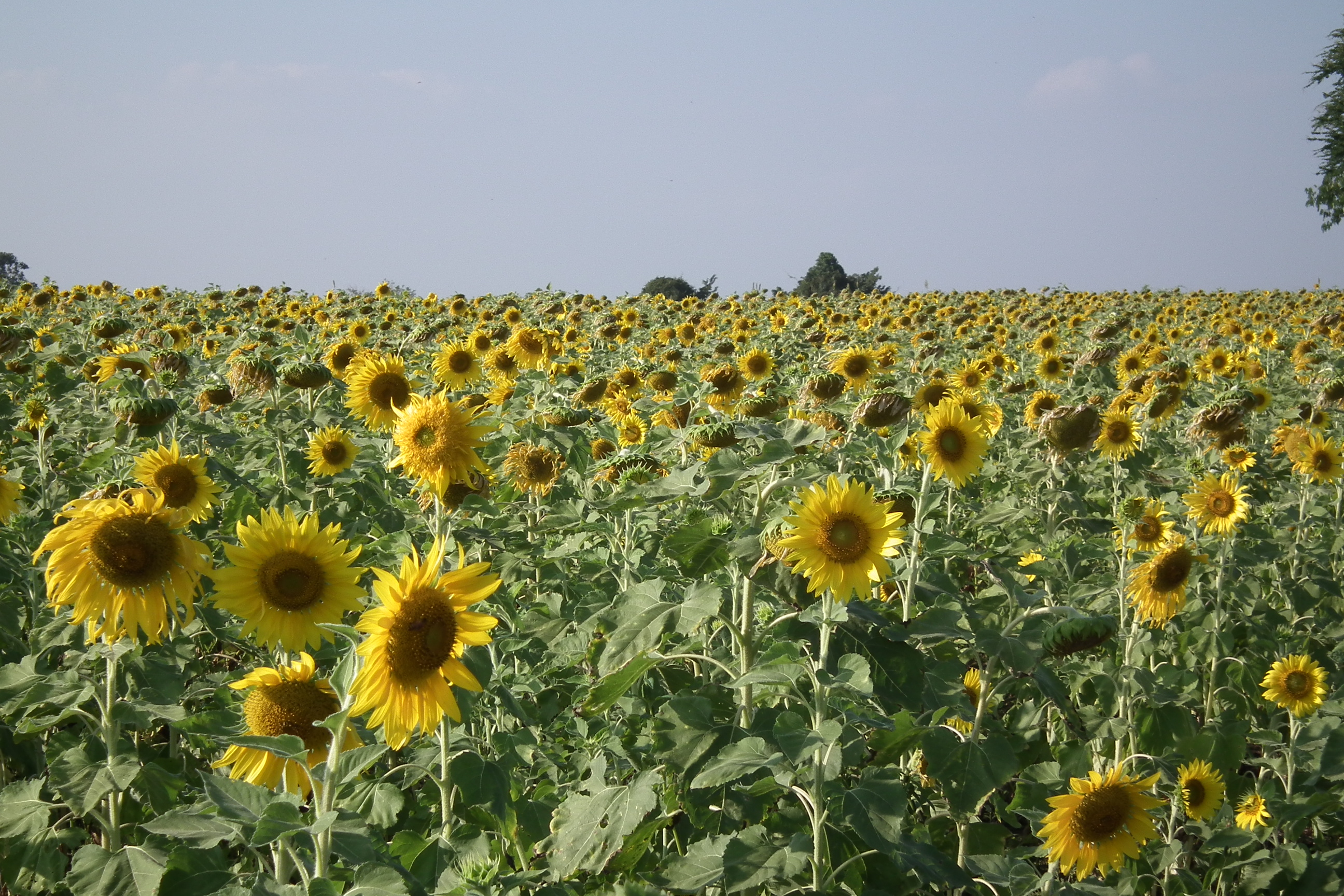
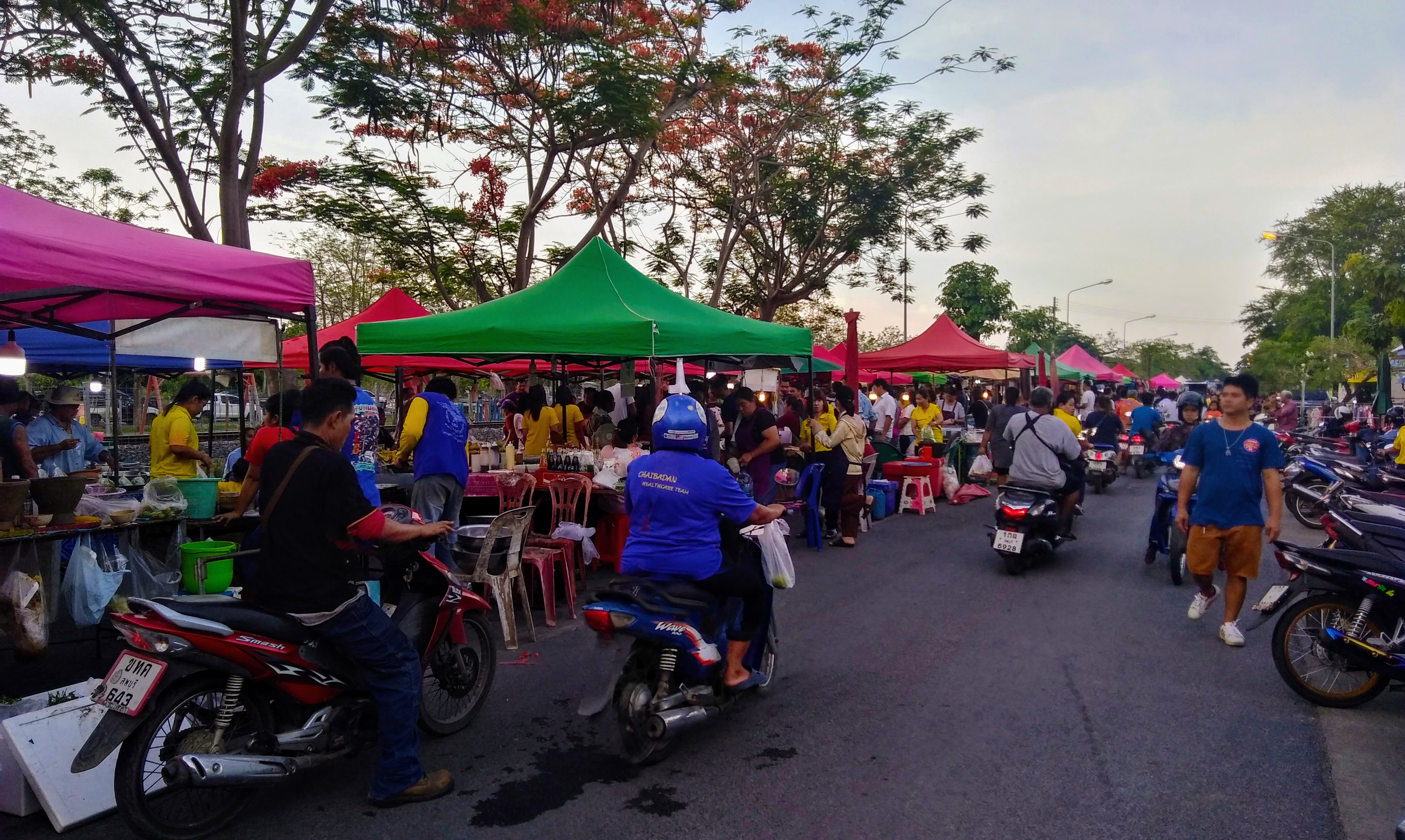
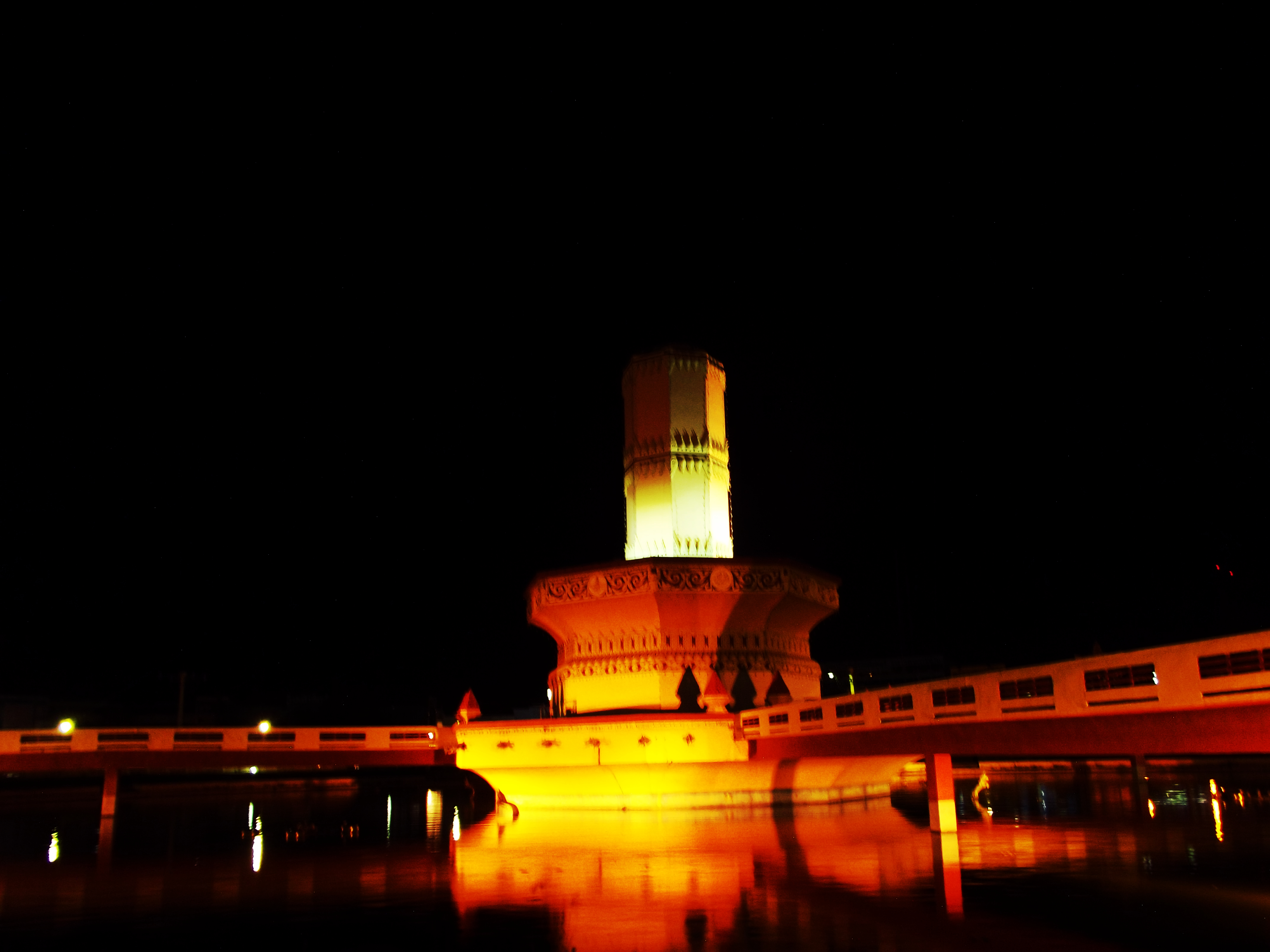
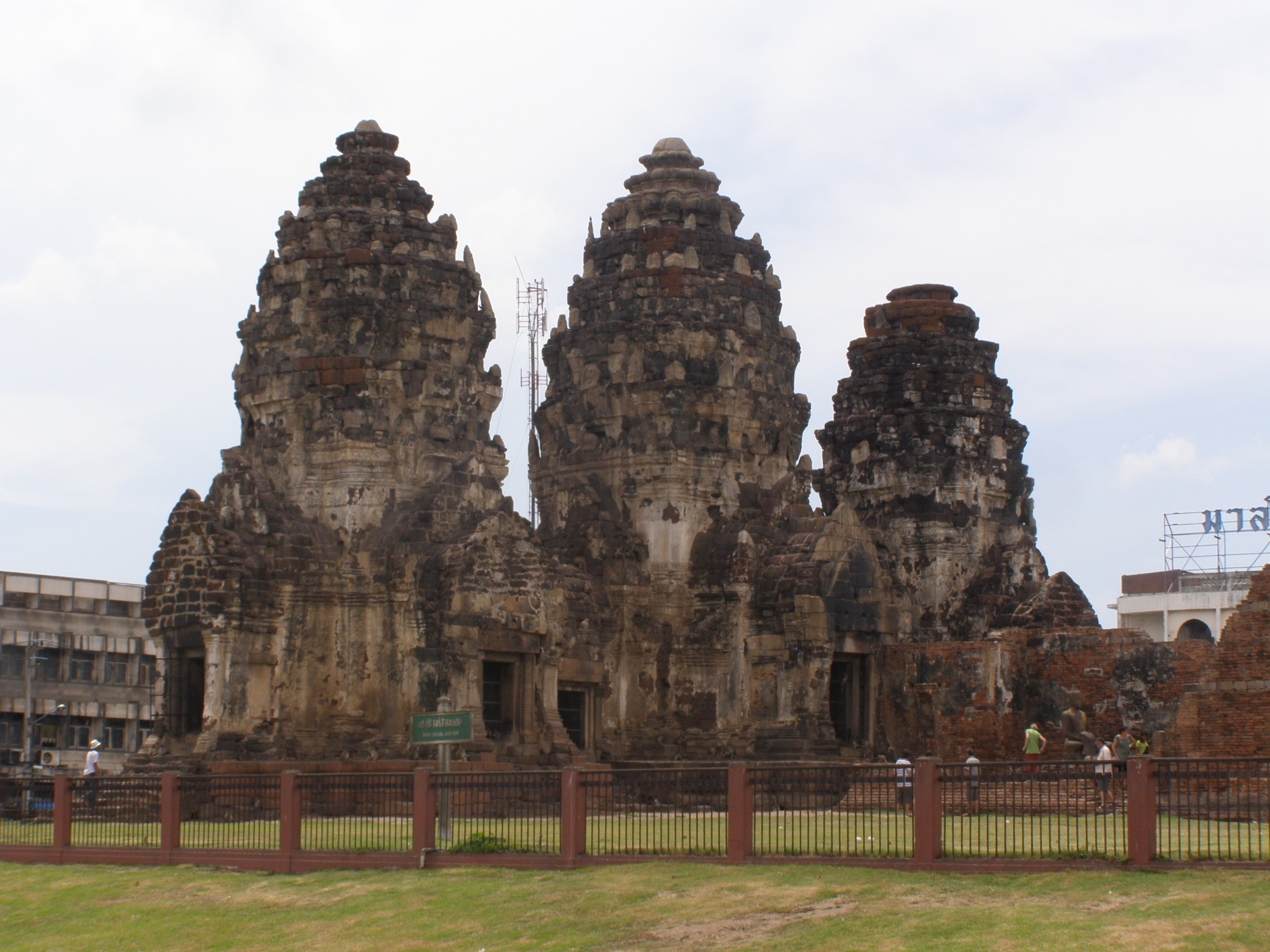
- (Clockwise from top left) Ridge of Pa Sak Jolasid Dam, Gate of King Narai's Palace, Sunflower fields in Phatthana Nikhom, Market by railway in Chai Badan, Sa Kaeo Roundabout, Phra Prang Sam Yot

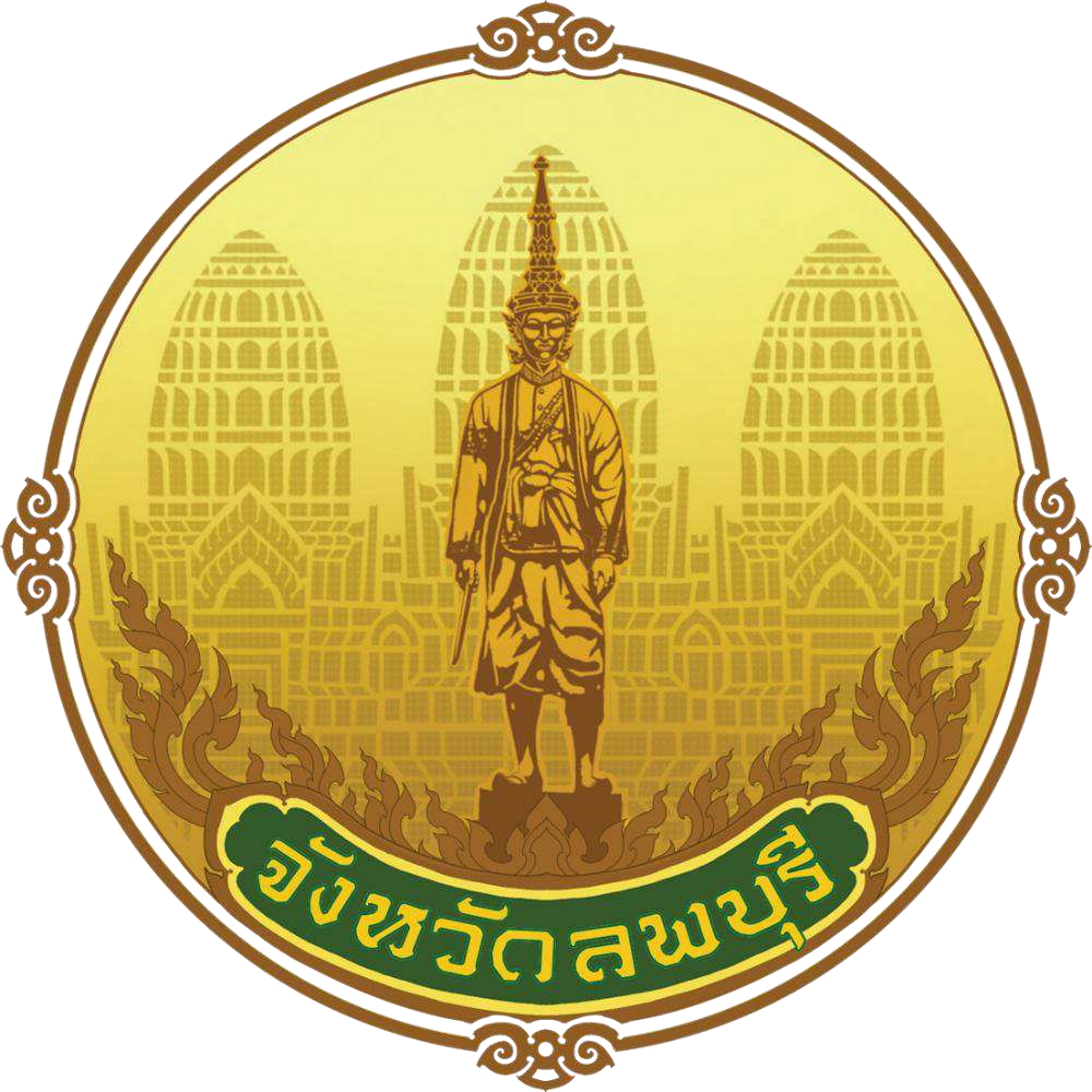
- Seal
- Nicknames: Lavo (Thai: ละโว้); Mueang Ling (lit. City of Monkeys)
- Motto: วังนารายณ์คู่บ้าน ศาลพระกาฬคู่เมือง ปรางค์สามยอดลือเลื่อง เมืองแห่งดินสอพอง เขื่อนป่าสักชลสิทธิ์เกริกก้อง แผ่นดินทองสมเด็จพระนารายณ์ ("King Narai's Palace, the pride of the land; San Phra Kan Shrine, the guardian of the city; Phra Prang Sam Yot, renowned through time; the land of Dinso Phong; Pa Sak Jolasid Dam, a resounding landmark; the golden realm of King Narai.")
- Map of Thailand highlighting Lop Buri province
- Country: Thailand
- Capital: Lopburi

Government
  - Governor: Amphon Angkapakornkun
  - PAO Chief Executive: Orapin Jiraphanwanit

Area
  - Total: 6,493 km^{2} (2,507 sq mi)
  - Rank: 31st

Population (2024)
  - Total: ▼725,266
  - Rank: 35th
  - Density: 112/km^{2} (290/sq mi)
  - Rank: 45th

Human Achievement Index
  - HAI (2022): 0.6529 "somewhat high" Ranked 23rd

GDP
  - Total: baht 112 billion (US$3.6 billion) (2019)
- Time zone: UTC+7 (ICT)
- Postal code: 15xxx
- Calling code: 036
- ISO 3166 code: TH-16
- Vehicle registration: ลพบุรี
- Website: lopburi.go.th

Lopburi (Thai: ลพบุรี, RTGS: Lop Buri, pronounced [lóp bū.rīː]) is a province in the central region of Thailand. The province is divided into 11 administrative districts, and Mueang Lopburi district is the capital. With over 720,000 people, the province is Thailand's 31st largest area and 35th most populous. There are eight neighboring provinces, Phetchabun, Chaiyaphum, Nakhon Ratchasima, Saraburi, Phra Nakhon Si Ayutthaya, Ang Thong, Sing Buri, and Nakhon Sawan.

Lopburi is a significant province historically, where many historical structures, artifacts, and prehistoric settlements have been discovered. In the past, Lopburi was called by the name Lavo.The kingdom had been ruled by an absolute monarch.

== History ==
Historical affiliations

Khmer empire 802–1052
Kingdom of Lavo 1052–1351
Kingdom of Ayutthaya 1351–1767
Kingdom of Thonburi 1767–1782
Kingdom of Siam 1782–1932
Kingdom of Thailand 1932–present

Known as Lavo during much of its history, Lopburi probably dates to prehistoric times. The name Lavo originated from the capital city of Lavo kingdom, an ancient Mon kingdom of the Dvaravati period (6th–11th century CE). The conquering Khmer would build many impressive temples in the city during its rule. Lopburi may even have liberated itself for a time, as it sent independent embassies to China in 1115 and 1155. In 1289 it sent another embassy to China, but soon became part of the Thai kingdom of Sukhothai and later Ayutthaya.

During the Ayutthaya period, King Ramathibodi I sent Phra Ramesuan (later King Ramesuan) as the Uparaja to reign in Lopburi. In 1666 King Narai the Great ordered a new palace built on the east bank of the Lopburi River and made Lopburi the second capital of the country, as Ayutthaya was threatened by the Dutch. After King Narai died, the city was almost abandoned and fell into ruin.

In 1856 King Mongkut of the Chakri dynasty ordered King Narai's palace to be renovated. The city finally regained its importance in 1937, when Field Marshal Plaek Phibunsongkhram chose Lopburi to be the largest military base in Thailand and once was decide to be new capital city of Thailand after the end of World War II.

== Geography ==
Lopburi is on the east side of the Chao Phraya River valley, between the Lopburi River and Pa Sak Rivers. Thirty percent of the area of the province, including most of Tha Wung district, the southwestern parts of Mueang Lopburi and Ban Mi districts are a very low alluvial plain. The other 70 percent is mixed plains and hills, with the Phetchabun Mountains forming the eastern boundary of the province towards the Khorat Plateau. The total forest area is 962 km^{2} (371 sq mi) or 14.8 percent of provincial area.

=== Wildlife sanctuary ===
There is one wildlife sanctuary in region 1 (Saraburi branch) of Thailand's protected areas.

- Sap Langka Wildlife Sanctuary, 155 km^{2} (60 sq mi)

== Climate ==
Lopburi province has a tropical savanna climate (Köppen climate classification category Aw). Winters are dry and warm. Temperatures rise until May. Monsoon season runs from May through October, with heavy rain and somewhat cooler temperatures during the day, although nights remain warm. Climatic statistics: Its maximum temperature is 41.4 °C (106.5 °F) in April and the lowest temperature is 10.2 °C (50.4 °F) in December. The highest average temperature is 36.8 °C (98.2 °F) and the minimum average temperature is 20.6 °C (69.1 °F). Annual average rainfall is 1,125 millimeters with mean rainy days is 17.6 in September. Maximum daily rainfall is 203.4 millimeters in October.

== Symbols ==
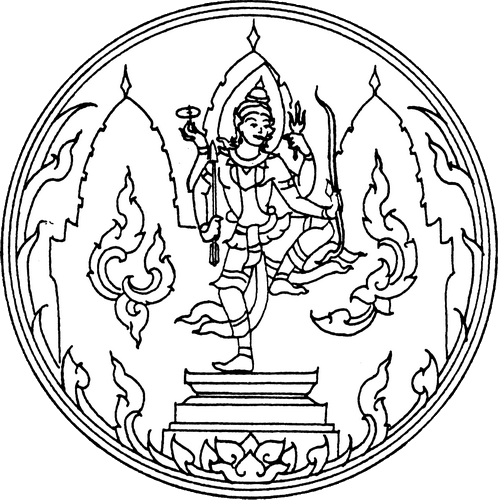
Original seal of Lopburi province (1940-2026).

The provincial seal shows Vishnu in front of the Khmer temple Phra Prang Sam Yod, designed in 1940s. In 2026, Thai Government designed a new provincial seal by replacing an image of the god Vishnu with a graphic of the Monument of King Narai which is situated in Lopburi city.

The escutcheon of Lopburi shows Vishnu and in the background Phra Prang Sam Yod, the "Sanctuary with the Three Towers". It refers to King Narai who in 1664 fortified the city to be used as an alternative capital when Ayutthaya was threatened by a Dutch naval blockade.

The provincial tree as well as the provincial flower is the bullet wood. The provincial aquatic life is the Java barb (Barbonymus gonionotus).

The slogan of the province is King Narai's Palace, The pride of the land; San Phra Kan Shrine, the Guardian of the City; Phra Prang Sam Yot, renowned through time; the land of Dinso Phong; Pa Sak Jolasid Dam, a resounding landmark; the golden realm of King Narai.

== Administrative divisions ==
Map of Lopburi with 11 districts

=== Provincial government ===
The province is subdivided into 11 districts (amphoe). The districts are further subdivided into 122 sub-districts (tambon) and 1,126 villages (muban).

1. Mueang Lopburi
2. Phatthana Nikhom
3. Khok Samrong
4. Chai Badan
5. Tha Wung
6. Ban Mi
7. Tha Luang
8. Sa Bot
9. Khok Charoen
10. Lam Sonthi
11. Nong Muang

=== Local government ===
As of 26 November 2019 there are: one Lopburi Provincial Administrative Organization (ongkan borihan suan changwat) and 23 municipal (thesaban) areas in the province. Lopburi, Khao Sam Yot and Ban Mi have town (thesaban mueang) status. Further 20 subdistrict municipalities (thesaban tambon). The non-municipal areas are administered by 102 Subdistrict Administrative Organizations - SAO (ongkan borihan suan tambon).

== Transportation ==
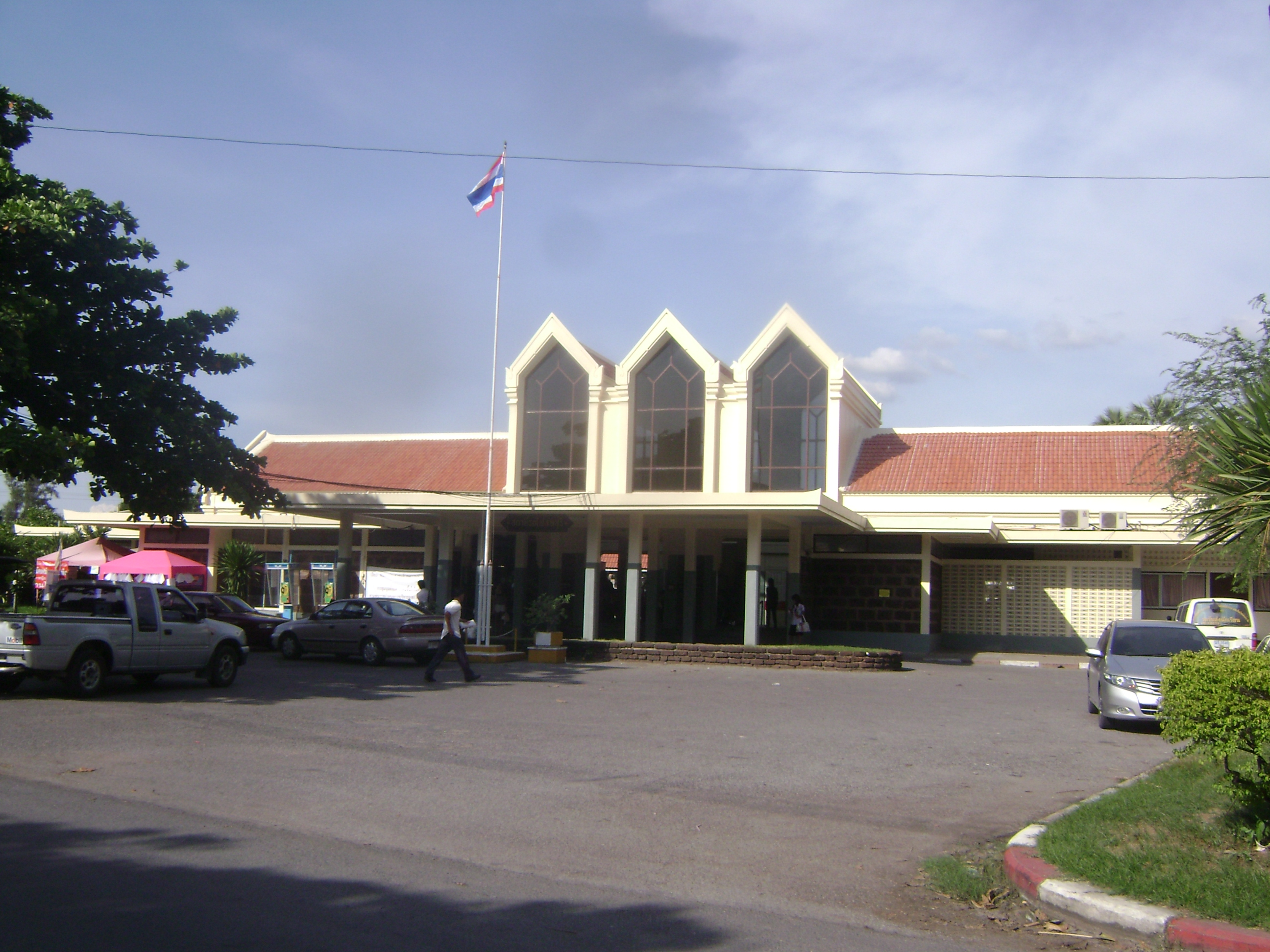
Lopburi station

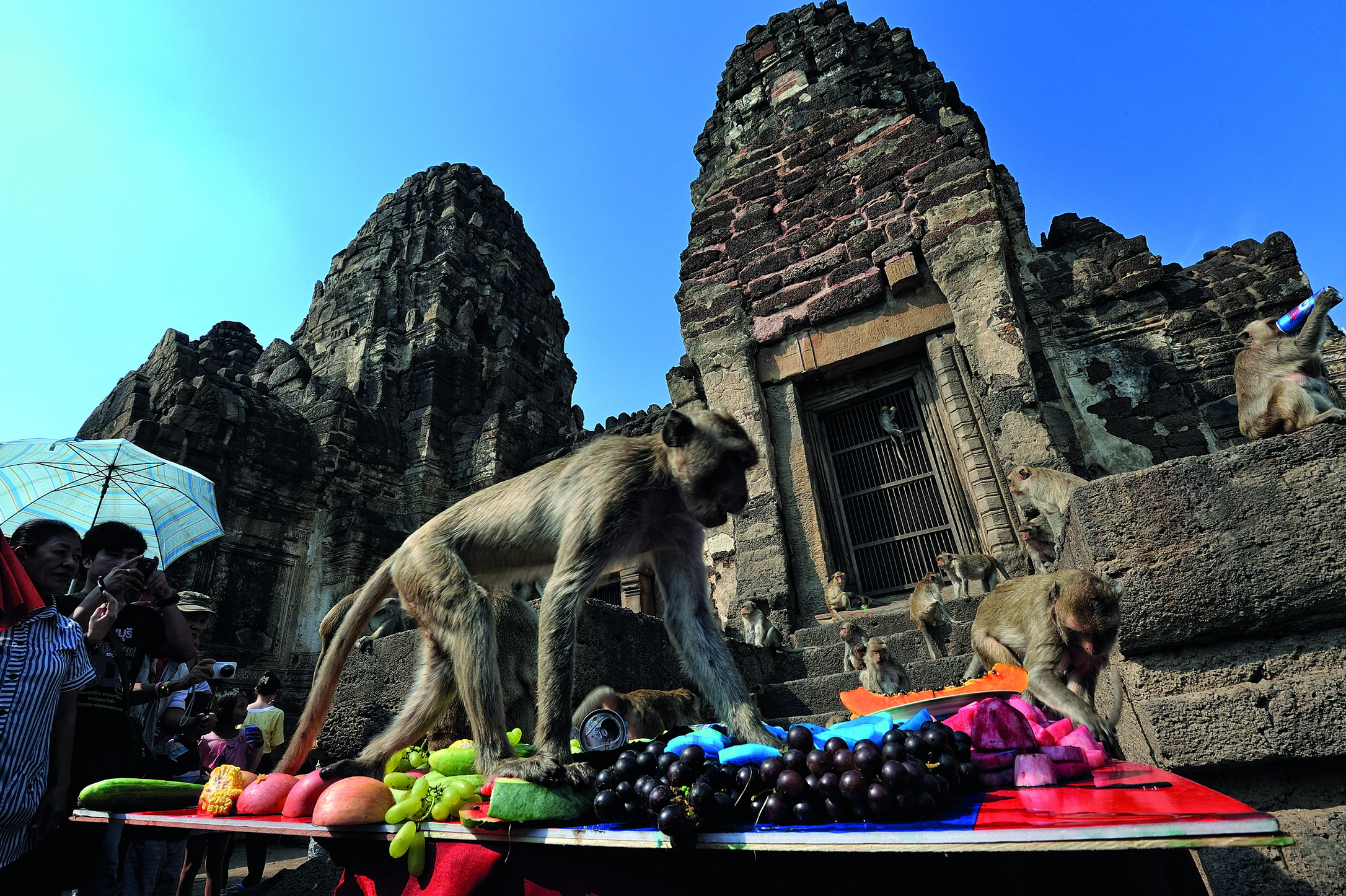
Macaques in Monkey Buffet Festival at Phra Prang Sam Yot

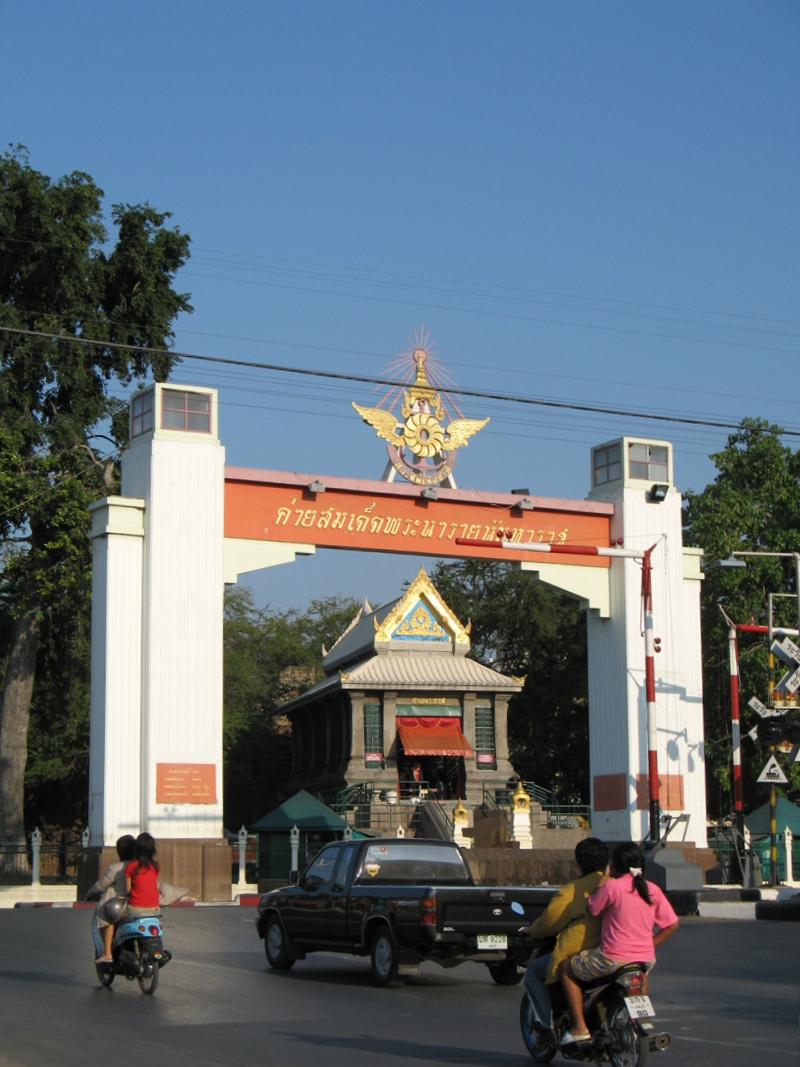
Lopburi City Gate, from old to new city

=== Rail ===
Lopburi railway station is the provincial main station of the State Railway of Thailand's Northern Line, the end of Bangkok's suburban service.

Lopburi 2 (Tha Wung) railway station opened on 5 December 2025, to serve rapid and express trains on a bypass line on the Northern Line.

=== Roads ===
The main road through Lobpuri is Highway 1 (Phahonyothin Road), which starts in Bangkok, and continues through Lopburi, Chai Nat, Nakhon Sawan, Kamphaeng Phet, Tak, Lampang, Chiang Rai, and the border with Burma at Mae Sai. Highway 311 leads west to Sing Buri, and Highway 3196 leads south-west to Ang Thong.

=== Air ===
Khok Kathiam Air Force Base is 9 kilometres (5.6 mi) north of the town. It has no commercial flights.

== Health ==
Lopburi's main hospital is King Narai Hospital, operated by the Ministry of Public Health.

== Education ==
- Thepsatri Rajabhat University
- Kasetsart University, Lopburi Campus
- Ramkhamhaeng University, Lopburi Campus
- Pibul Wittayalai School

== Attractions ==
- San Phra Kan
- Phra Prang Sam Yot
- King Narai's Palace
- Wat Phra Si Rattana Mahathat
- Ban Chao Phraya Wichayen
- Prang Khaek
- Wat Khao Wong Prachan
- Wang Kan Lueang Waterfall
- Pa Sak Jolasid Dam and the railway viaduct ("the floating railway")
- Sunflower fields of Phatthana Nikhom

== Events and festivals ==
- King Narai Reign Fair (งานแผ่นดินสมเด็จพระนารายณ์): Event held annually, it is considered the greatest fair of the province. The objective is to honour King Narai the Great, who used to live here. The highlight is that all Lopburi people are dressed in traditional Thai clothes throughout the province and there is a sound and light performance at the King Narai's Palace in the evening. This fair is promoted by Tourism Authority of Thailand (TAT).
- Monkey Buffet Festival (เทศกาลโต๊ะจีนลิง): Annually buffet held during November for herd of macaques that live at ancient Khmer temple, Phra Prang Sam Yot and nearby Phra Kan Shrine in the centre of province, which they are like a symbol of the province. It was first organized in the year 1989.
- Climbing Up Khao Wong Phra Chan Festival (ประเพณีขึ้นเขาวงพระจันทร์): Pilgrimage inscription by climbing up 3,790 steps of Khao Wong Phrachan (crescent moon hill), the province's highest hill that located in Khok Samrong district for pay homage to replica of the Lord Buddha's footprint and Buddha statues that enshrined on the top of the hill. This festival is usually held on the Chinese New Year period and has been very popular, especially from Thai people of Chinese descent.

== Human achievement index 2022 ==
Health	Education	Employment	Income
25	16	23	45
Housing	Family	Transport	Participation
47	40	51	50
Province Lopburi, with an HAI 2022 value of 0.65297 is "somewhat high", occupies place 23 in the ranking.

Since 2003, United Nations Development Programme (UNDP) in Thailand has tracked progress on human development at sub-national level using the Human achievement index (HAI), a composite index covering all the eight key areas of human development. National Economic and Social Development Board (NESDB) has taken over this task since 2017.

Rank	Classification
1 - 13	"high"
14 - 29	"somewhat high"
30 - 45	"average"
46 - 61	"somewhat low"
62 - 77	"low"

Map with provinces and HAI 2022 rankings
