= Monkey Buffet Festival =

Annual festival held in Lopburi, Thailand

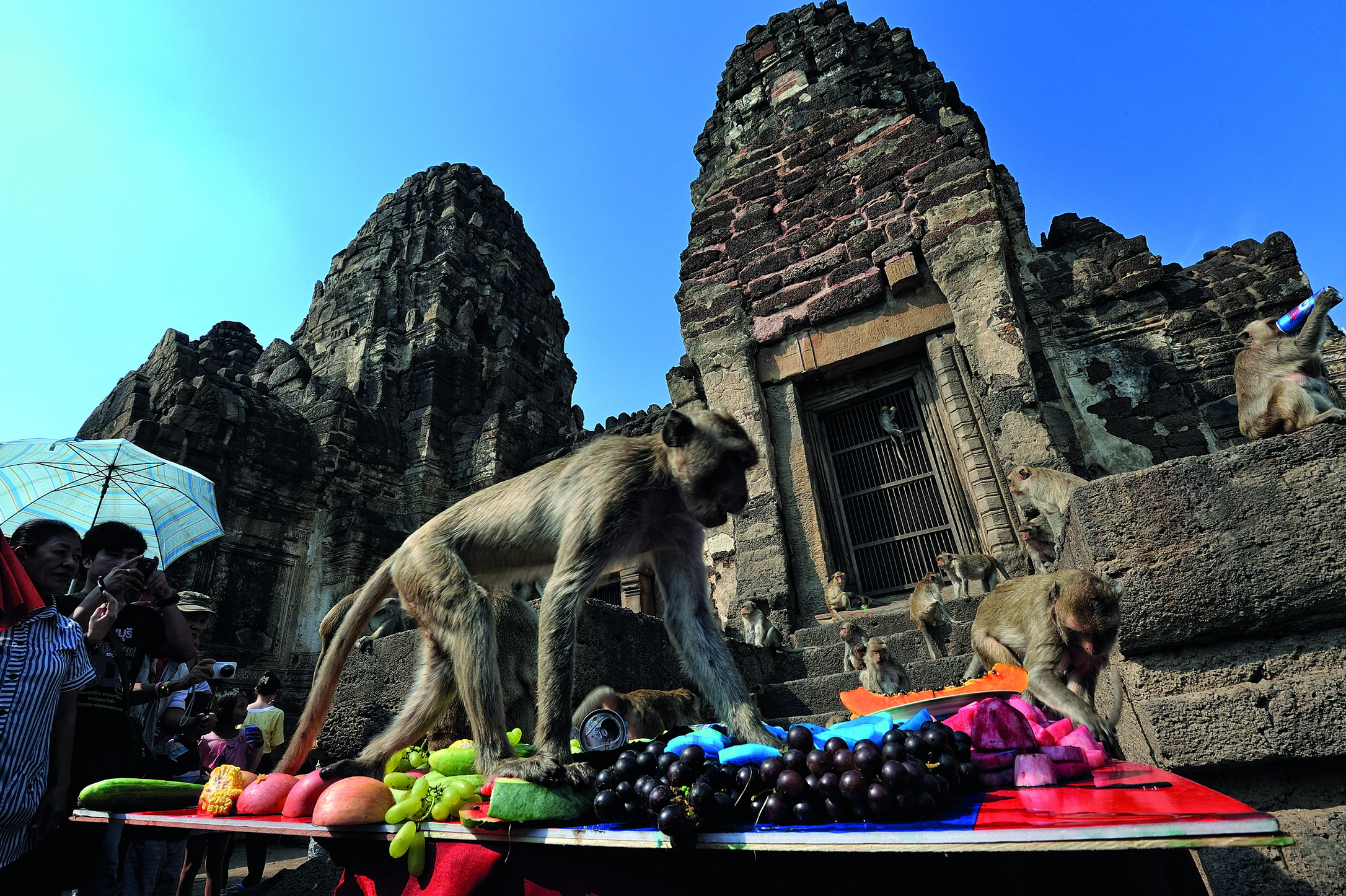
Macaques at the Monkey Buffet Festival at Phra Prang Sam Yot

The Monkey Buffet Festival is an annual festival held in Lopburi, Thailand. In 2007, the festival included giving fruits and vegetables to the local monkey population of 2,000 crab-eating macaques in Lopburi Province north of Bangkok.

The festival was described as one of the strangest festivals by London's Guardian newspaper along with Spain's baby-jumping festival. A photograph from the Monkey Buffet Festival at Phra Prang Sam Yod temple in Lopburi Province shows a monkey trying to get at fresh fruits and vegetables embedded in blocks of ice.

By 2024, the monkey population had grown to 3,000, leading to significant conflict with human residents. Monkeys were snatching bags, stealing drinks, and rummaging through homes in search of food. The government launched a campaign to round up and sterilize monkeys; within five months, 1,600 monkeys were in captivity for neutering.
