= Phra Prang Sam Yot =

13th-century temple in Lopburi, Thailand

Phra Prang Sam Yot Thai: พระปรางค์สามยอด
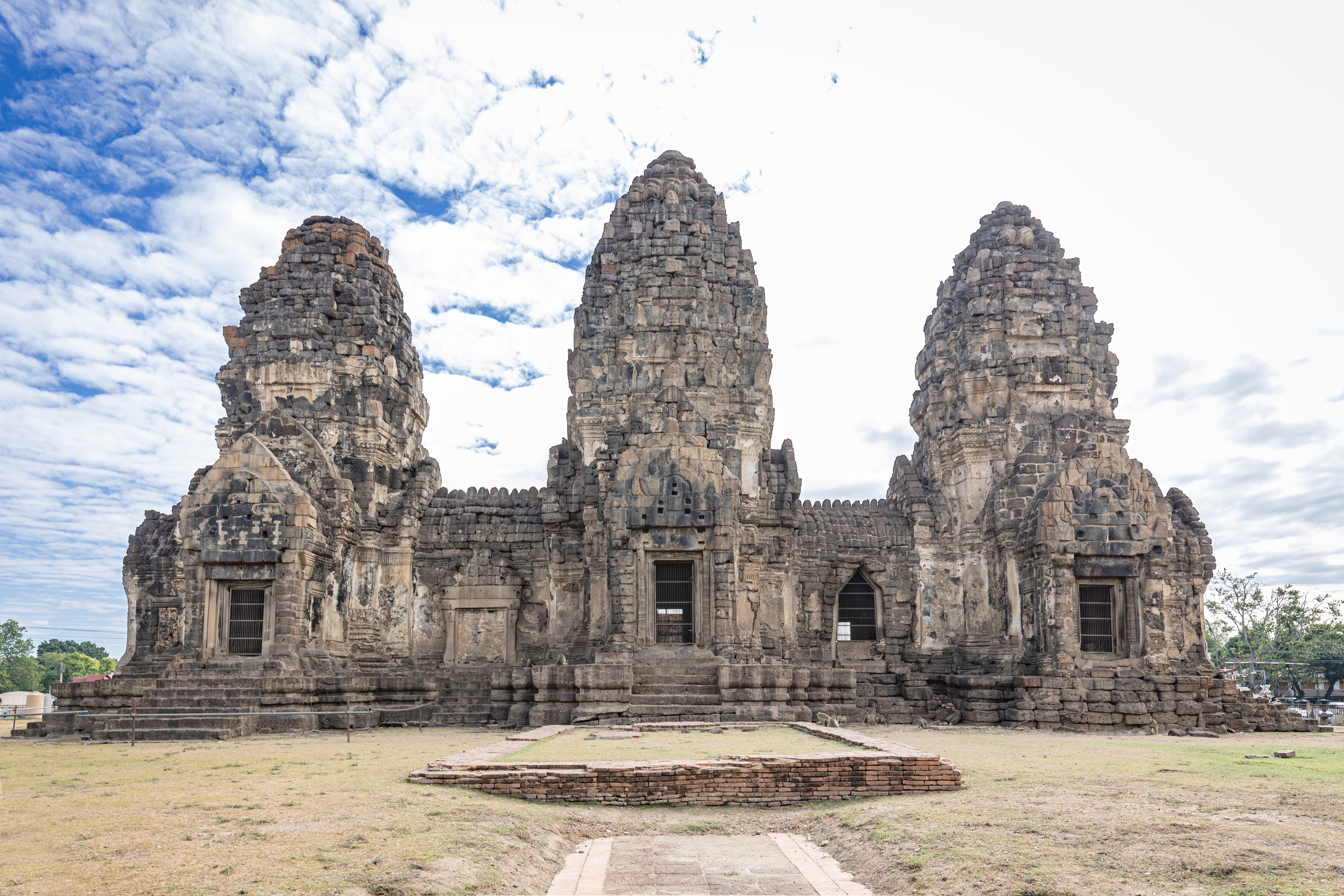

- Location within Thailand

Religion
- Affiliation: Theravada Buddhism
- Status: Open

Location
- Location: Lopburi, Lopburi province, Thailand
- Country: Thailand
- Interactive map of Phra Prang Sam Yot; Thai: พระปรางค์สามยอด
- Coordinates: 14°48′10″N 100°36′51″E

Architecture
- Founder: Jayavarman VII
- Groundbreaking: c. 1200

Phra Prang Sam Yot, also known as Phra Prang Sam Yod, is a 13th-century Angkorian temple in Lopburi, Thailand. The temple is currently a popular tourist destination.

== Description ==
The temple was built by King Jayavarman VII of the Khmer Empire in the early 13th century. Jayavarman intended for the temple to be an important location in the royal cult surrounding himself, as it would increase the legitimacy of his rule. In addition, the temple served to showcase the prestige of the Khmer Empire in Lopburi (then known as Lavo) as it had only recently captured the city from its Cham and Mon rivals. One prominent statue in the temple was dedicated by Jayavarman to "Jayabuddhamahanatha", which is translatable to "Victorious Buddha, the Great Protector" - further evidence of the temple's martial origins. Built along the lines of contemporaneous Khmer architecture, the temple is made from brick with a stucco exterior, the latter possibly being inspired by Mon architectural tradition. The structure has three towers, each with a corresponding deity; the north tower is dedicated to Prajnaparamita, the central tower to the Buddha, and the south tower to Avalokiteśvara. The temple is furnished with art depicting Buddhist iconography. Originally dedicated to Mahayana Buddhism, the temple survived the end of the Khmer influence over Lavo, and the temple was later rededicated to Theravada Buddhism when Lopburi came under the control of the Ayutthaya Kingdom. During the reign of Narai the Great (1656-1688) of Ayutthaya, a prayer hall (Wihar) was added to the temple complex. Phra Prang Sam Yot became a registered historical site by the Fine Arts Department on 2 August 1936.

An image of Phra Prang Sam Yot is featured on the World War II Special Series 1000 Baht Thai baht note, and the temple is featured prominently on both the provincial seal and flag of Lopburi Province. The temple is often studied by Thai students. While it remains the site of active prayer, several sources have noted the temple is more popular as a tourist destination due to its resident population of monkeys. The temple itself however is in relatively poor condition.

=== Monkeys ===
The temple is famous for its large population of crab-eating macaque monkeys, which live in and around the temple grounds. The monkey population has always been present in Lopburi, but the start of the locally-held Monkey Buffet Festival in 1989 led to a dramatic increase in their population. The festival serves a dual purpose, drawing in tourists while also honoring the traditional Lopburi belief that monkeys are disciples of Jao Paw Phra Kan, a spirit which protects the city.

While the monkeys provide a valuable boon to local tourism, their activities have caused some damage to the temple's exterior (they are prevented from entering the temple).

== See also ==
- Prang Khaek
