= List of governors of Lop Buri =

Governor of the Lopburi province
- ผู้ว่าราชการจังหวัดลพบุรี
- Seal of the Lopburi province

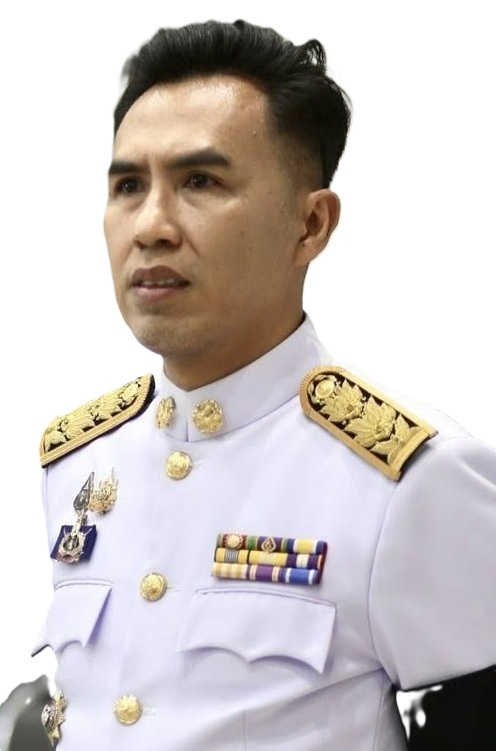
- Incumbent; Weerapong Ritrod since 7 December 2025
- Style: Mr. Governor (informal); The Honourable (formal); His Excellency (diplomatic)
- Reports to: Ministry of Interior
- Residence: Lopburi Governor's Residence
- Seat: Lopburi City Hall
- Nominator: Minister of Interior
- Appointer: King of Thailand; (by royal command)
- Term length: Four years, or Retirement; (as approved by the cabinet)
- Formation: 1899; 127 years ago
- First holder: Phraya Phisutthitham Thada
- Deputy: Deputy Governor of Lopburi
- Salary: ฿105,800 per month ($3,167 USD)
- Website: www.lopburi.go.th

List of the provincial governors (ผู้ว่าราชการจังหวัด) of Lopburi province, Thailand.

| No. | Name | Thai | Years in office |
|---|---|---|---|
| 1 | Phraya Phisutthithamma Thada | พระยาพิสุทธิธรรมธาดา | 1899 – 1912 |
| 2 | Phraya Sunthon Songkhram | พระยาสุนทรสงคราม | 1912 – 1914 |
| 3 | Phraya Nakhon Phra Ram | พระยานครพระราม | 1914 – 1917 |
| 4 | Phraya Phitsanulok Buri | พระยาพิษณุโลกบุรี | 1917 – 1921 |
| 5 | Phraya Wiset Chai Chan | พระยาวิเศษไชยชาญ | 1921 – 1923 |
| 6 | Phraya Kamchat Son Thucharit | พระยากำจัดโสณฑ์ทุจริต | 1923 – 1926 |
| 7 | Phraya Nayok Norachon | พระยานายกนรชน | 1926 –1927 |
| 8 | Phra Borihan Thep Thani | พระบริหารเทพธานี | 1927 – 1930 |
| 9 | Phraya Phetchara Aphiban | พระยาเพ็ชรอภิบาล | 1930 – 1933 |
| 10 | Phraya Anachak Boriban | พระยาอาณาจักรบริบาล | 1933 |
| 11 | Luang Thamnakka Nikonrachon | หลวงทำนักนิกรชน | 1933 – 1935 |
| 12 | Luang Sarit Sara Lak | หลวงสฤษฎิ์สาราลักษณ์ | 1935 – 1936 |
| 13 | Luang Atsawin Siri Wilat | หลวงอัศวินศิริวิลาศ | 1936 – 1937 |
| 14 | Luang Yuttha Sara Prasit | หลวงยุทธสารประสิทธิ์ | June 21, 1937 – 1938 |
| 15 | Phra Phichai Son Phlaeng | พระพิชัยศรแผลง | 1938 – April 18, 1939 |
| 16 | Luang Yothi Phithak | หลวงโยธีพิทักษ์ | December 4, 1939 – 1940 |
| 17 | Khunchan Chaichak | ขุนชาญ ใช้จักร | July 19, 1940 – 1942 |
| 18 | Khunthong Sunthonsaeng | ขุนทอง สุนทรแสง | 1942 |
| 19 | Sak Thaiwat | ศักดิ์ ไทยวัฒน์ | May 1, 1942 – 1945 |
| 20 | Chom Chatinan | ชม ชาตินันท์ | July 7, 1945 – 1946 |
| 21 | Khun Buri Phirom Kit | ขุนบุรีภิรมย์กิจ | October 16, 1946 – August 18, 1947 |
| 22 | Luang Si Narasai | หลวงศรีนราศัย | August 22, 1947 – December 5, 1948 |
| 23 | Sak Thaiwat | ศักดิ์ ไทยวัฒน์ | December 7, 1948 – February 28, 1951 |
| 24 | Chalo Wanaphuti | ชลอ วนะภูติ | January 14, 1951 – April 3, 1953 |
| 25 | Sawat Phibunnakharin | สวัสดิ์ พิบูลนครินทร์ | April 3, 1953 – December 7, 1957 |
| 26 | San Ekmahachai | สันต์ เอกมหาชัย | August 6, 1957 – August 30, 1959 |
| 27 | Yut Nunphakdi | ยุทธ หนุนภักดี | August 30, 1959 – September 30, 1967 |
| 28 | Samat Wayawanon | สามารถ วายวานนท์ | October 1, 1967 – September 30, 1972 |
| 29 | Chalong Watcharakon | ฉลอง วัชรากร | October 1, 1972 – September 30, 1976 |
| 30 | Wit Nimnuan | วิทย์ นิ่มนวล | October 1, 1976 – July 23, 1977 |
| 31 | Chao-wat Sutlapha | เชาวน์วัศ สุดลาภา (th) | July 24, 1977 – July 30, 1979 |
| 32 | Chodok Wiratham Phunsawat | โชดก วีรธรรม พูลสวัสดิ์ | September 1, 1979 – April 20, 1981 |
| 33 | Withan Suwannathat | วิธาน สุวรรณทัต | April 25, 1981 – September 30, 1984 |
| 34 | Chit Ninlaphanit | ชิต นิลพานิช | October 1, 1984 – March 31, 1987 |
| 35 | Anek Rotchanaphaibun | เอนก โรจนไพบูลย์ | November 1, 1987 – October 31, 1989 |
| 36 | Prakrit Ruamwong | ประกฤติ ร่วมวงศ์ | November 1, 1989 – September 30, 1991 |
| 37 | Wichian Pao-in | วิเชียร เปาอินทร์ | October 1, 1991 – September 30, 1994 |
| 38 | Manut Watthanakomen | มนุชญ์ วัฒนโกเมร | October 1, 1994 – September 30, 1999 |
| 39 | Thawisak Wiangwiset | ทวีศักดิ์ เวียงวิเศษ | October 1, 1999 – April 30, 2002 |
| 40 | Chanin Buaprasoet | ชนินทร์ บัวประเสริฐ | May 1, 2002 – September 30, 2003 |
| 41 | Parinya Udomsap | ปริญญา อุดมทรัพย์ | October 1, 2003 – September 30, 2004 |
| 42 | Wichai Sikhwan | วิชัย ศรีขวัญ | October 1, 2004 – November 12, 2006 |
| 43 | Suwat Tantiphat | สุวัฒน์ ตันติพัฒน์ | November 13, 2006 – September 30, 2007 |
| 44 | Charuphong Phonladet | จารุพงศ์ พลเดช | October 1, 2007 – September 30, 2009 |
| 45 | Chatchai Phromlert | ฉัตรชัย พรหมเลิศ (th) | October 1, 2009 – September 30, 2012 |
| 46 | Phichet Phaibunsiri | พิเชษฐ ไพบูลย์ศิริ | October 8, 2012 – October 1, 2013 |
| 47 | Thanakom Chongchira | ธนาคม จงจิระ | October 2, 2013 – September 30, 2015 |
| 48 | Phanu Yaemsri | ภานุ แย้มศรี | October 1, 2015 – September 30, 2017 |
| 49 | Supakit Phopaphaphan | สุปกิต โพธิ์ปภาพันธ์ | October 1, 2017 – September 30, 2020 |
| 50 | Niwat Rungsakorn | นิวัฒน์ รุ่งสาคร | October 1, 2020 – September 30, 2022 |
| 51 | Amphon Angkhaphakornkul | อำพล อังคภากรณ์กุล | October 1, 2022 – Incumbent |

Comment: Till 1941 the Thai year began on April 1, thus some of the years in the table above may be off by one
