= Prang Khaek =

Prang Khaek Thai: ปรางค์แขก
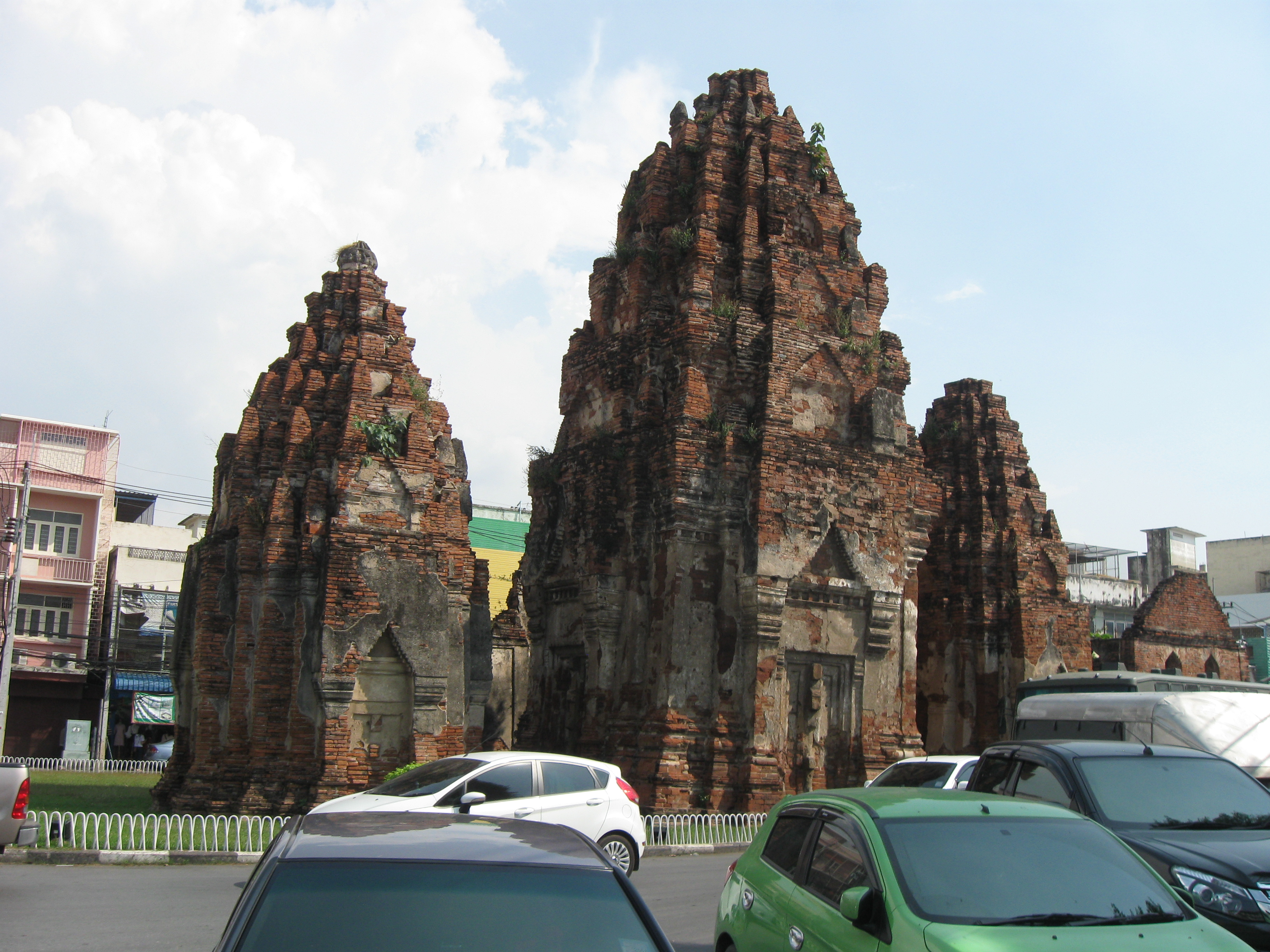

- Location within Thailand

Religion
- Affiliation: Hinduism
- Status: Open

Location
- Location: Lopburi, Lopburi province, Thailand
- Country: Thailand
- Interactive map of Prang Khaek; Thai: ปรางค์แขก

Architecture
- Founder: likely Suryavarman II
- Groundbreaking: c. 1100

Prang Khaek (Thai: ปรางค์แขก), also known officially as Devasathan Prang Khaek (Thai: เทวสถานปรางค์แขก), is a 9-10th century Angkorian Hindu temple in Lopburi, Thailand.

== History ==
The exact date Prang Khaek was constructed is unknown but it has been suggested that the temple was constructed in the 15th century (c.1050 AD) or 16th century (c.1150 AD) of the Buddhist calendar, given the architectural similarities to other Angkorian temples of the Suryavarman II era. This makes Prang Khaek the oldest Angkorian temple in Lopburi and Central Thailand. It was possibly constructed by royal decree or by the order of local chieftains in the area.

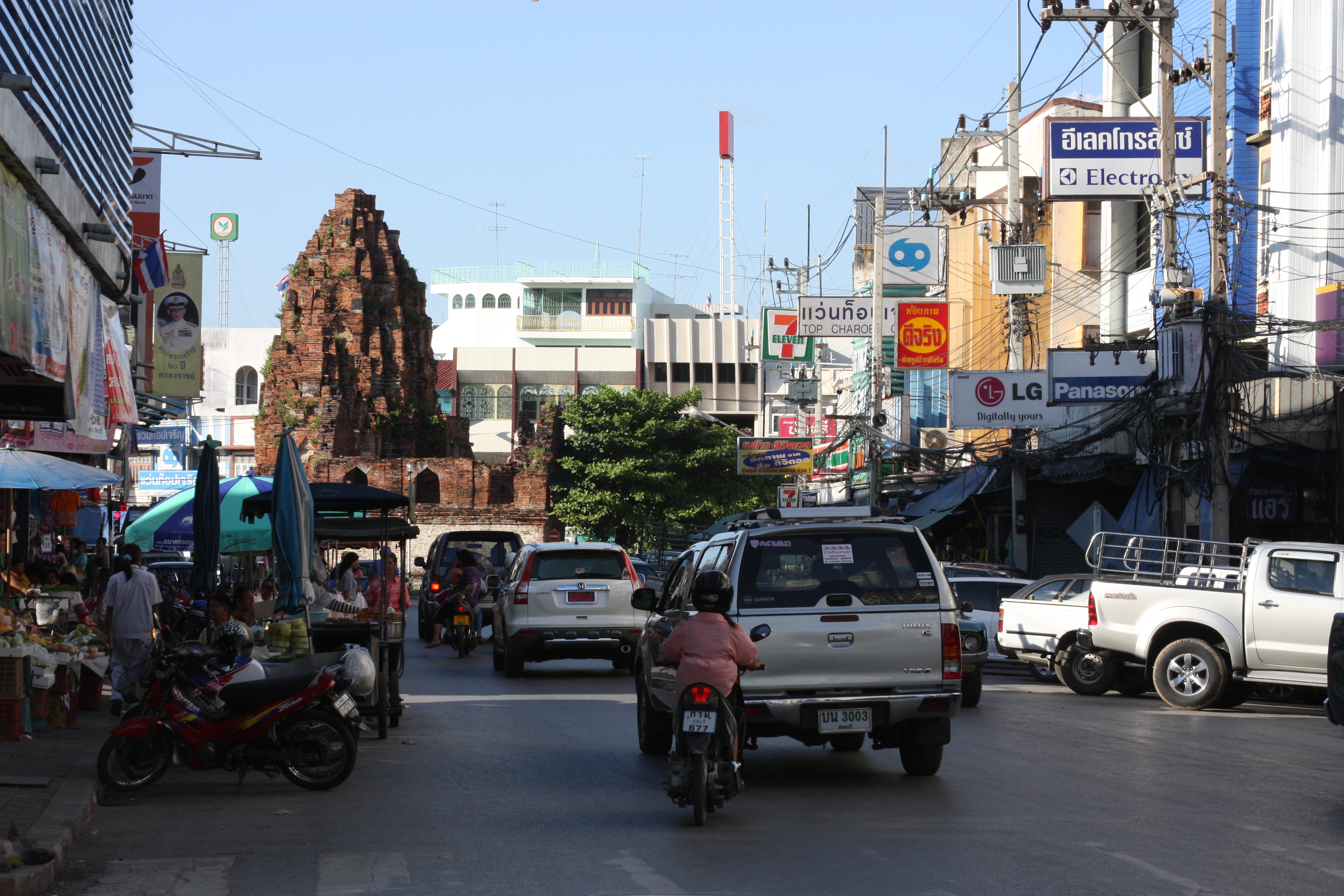
Prang Khaek seen from Sura Songkhram Road

Prang Khaek was registered as a historical site by the Fine Arts Department on 2 August 1936, along the with adjacent Phra Prang Sam Yot.

== Architecture ==
Built in the Khmer architectural style, the temple consists of three individual brick towers with a stucco exterior, arranged in a north–south direction facing the east, as is common in the Khmer style. Each tower has a single entrance and unlike the nearby Phra Prang Sam Yot, no internal corridors connect between each tower. The central tower is the largest and remnants of a Shiva linga has been discovered.

It was believed to be originally built only of brick, but during King Narai's reign, the structure was reinforced with stucco. Furthermore, two more structures were constructed in this period: a prayer hall (Vihara) at the front, and a water collection tank at the rear. These two newer structures were built in the Thai style with European influence as was popular at the time. In 1961, the Fine Arts Department reinforced the temple base with concrete. Today it stands on the traffic island at the intersection of Sura Songkhram and Wichayen Roads.

== See also ==
- Phra Prang Sam Yot
