= King Narai's Palace =

17th-century palace in Thailand

Coordinates: 14°47′59″N 100°36′36″E

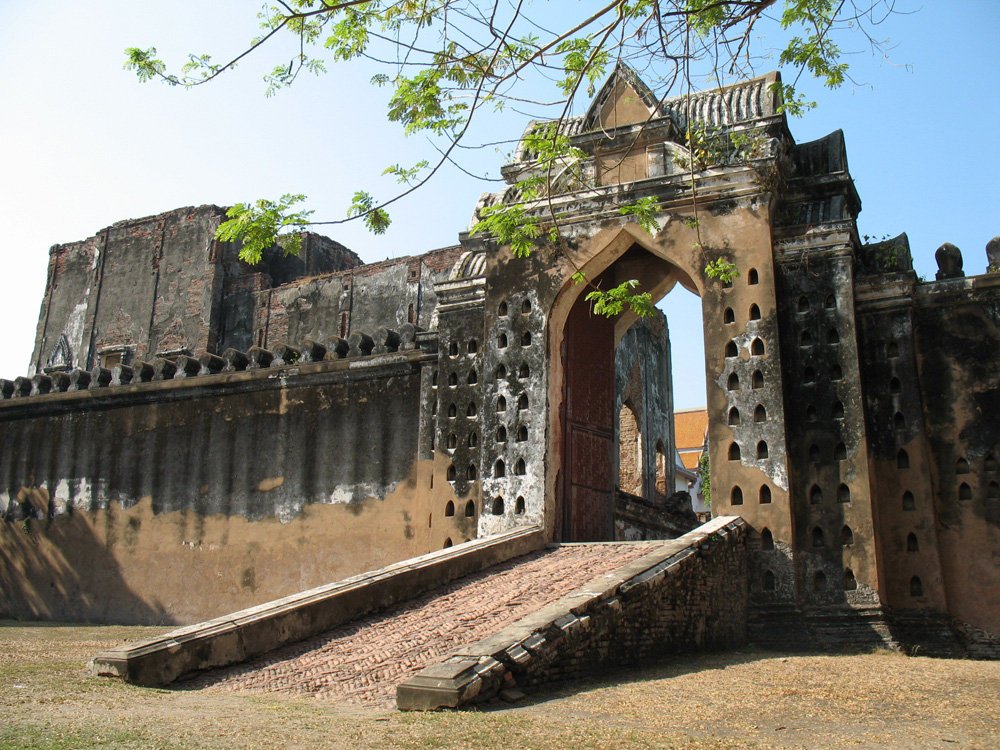
Palace Inner Gate

The King Narai's Palace (Thai: พระนารายณ์ราชนิเวศน์; RTGS: Phra Narai Ratchaniwet) in Lopburi was built by King Narai the Great, the king who ruled Ayutthaya from 1656 to 1688. He ordered the palace built in 1666 in the same area as King Ramesuan's Palace. King Narai stayed here for about 8–9 months a year, except during the rainy season. He designated Lopburi as the second capital of the Ayutthaya Kingdom. The palace was a place for relaxation, hunting, administering the country's affairs, and welcoming official visitors. When the king died in 1688, Lopburi and the palace were abandoned.

The palace is described in the Eulogy of King Narai, probably composed around 1680. The description highlights the system for bringing piped water to the palace.

King Mongkut (Rama IV) of Rattanakosin ordered the restoration of King Narai's Palace. He built a new throne hall complex (Phiman Monkut Pavilion) for his stay in 1856. He also renamed the palace Phra Narai Rajanivet. During King Chulalongkorn's (Rama V) reign, Phiman Mongkut Pavilion, which had been King Mongkut's accommodations, was given to the government to use as the Lopburi City Hall. On October 11, 1924, Prince Damrong Rajanubhab and Prince Narisara Nuwattiwong opened the Chantarapisarn Pavilion in King Narai's palace as a museum, calling it the Lopburi Museum. Later, in 1961 the name of the museum was changed to Somdet Phra Narai National Museum. To date, the museum has exhibited more than 1,864 items of the collection of ancient artifacts in different pavilions and buildings of the palace.

== Gallery ==
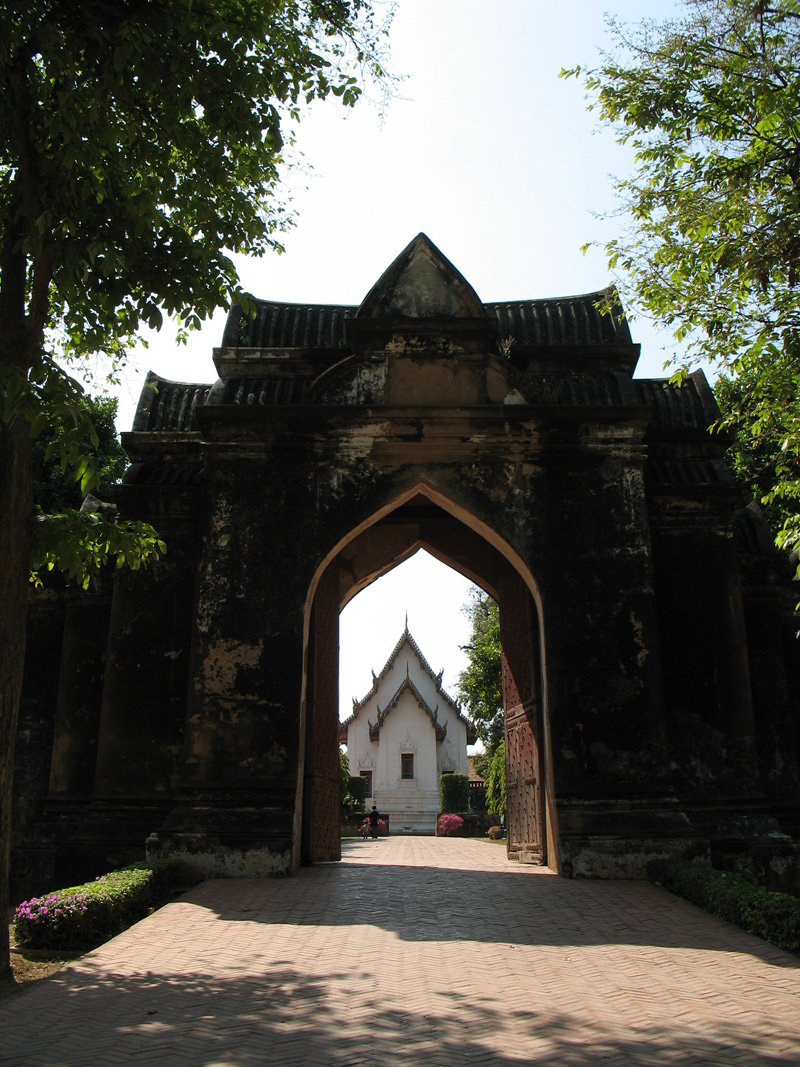
Palace Inner Gate

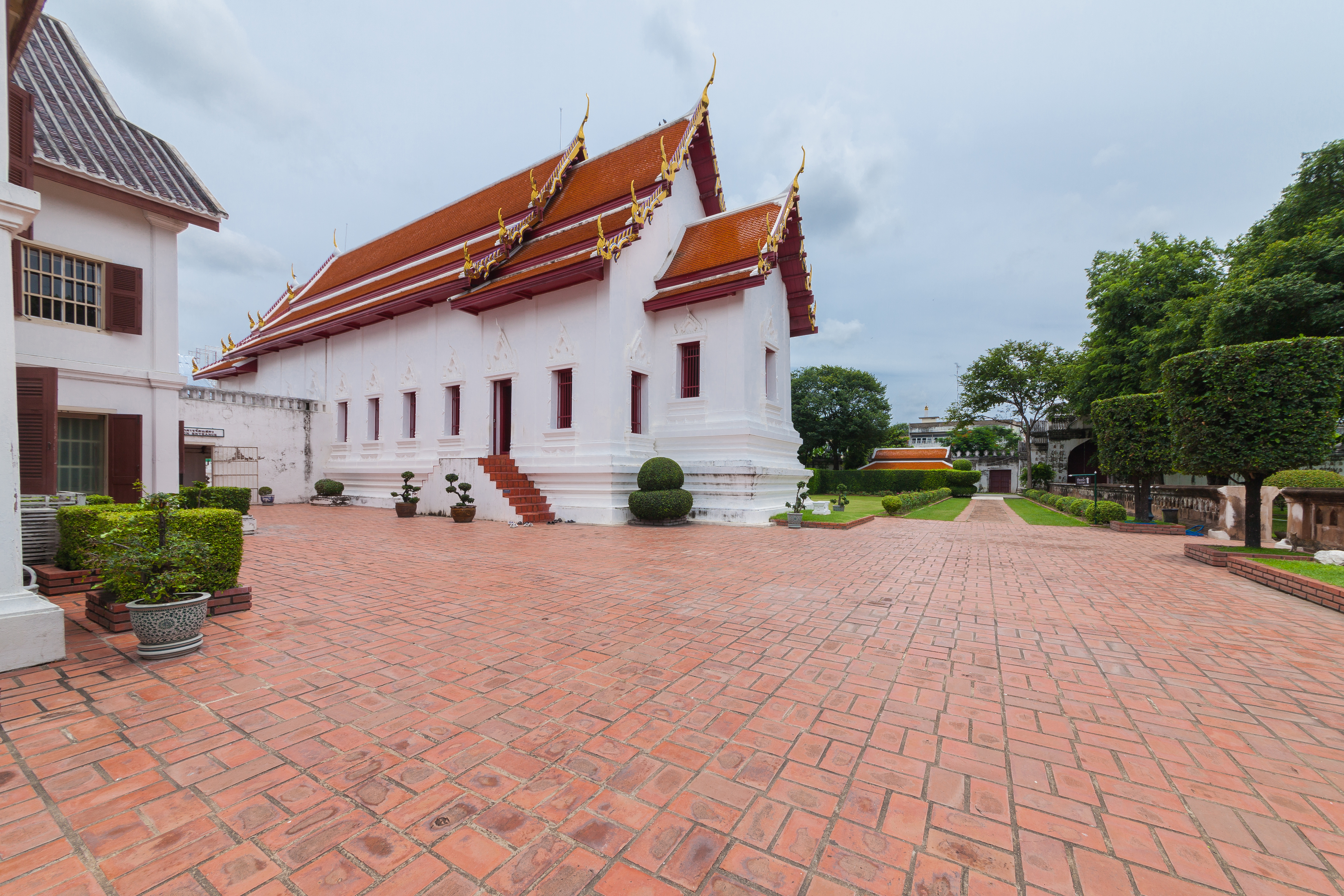
Chantara Phisan Hall

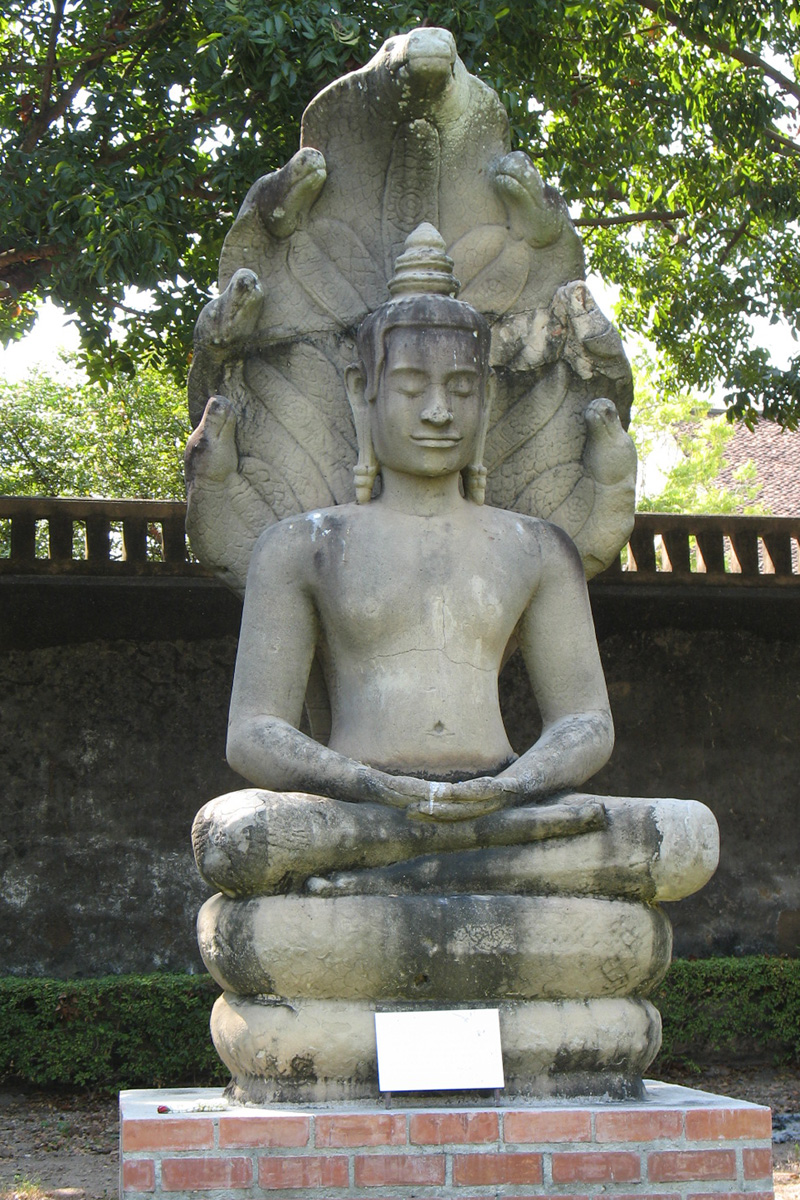
Phra Nak Prok, beside Chantara Phisan Hall

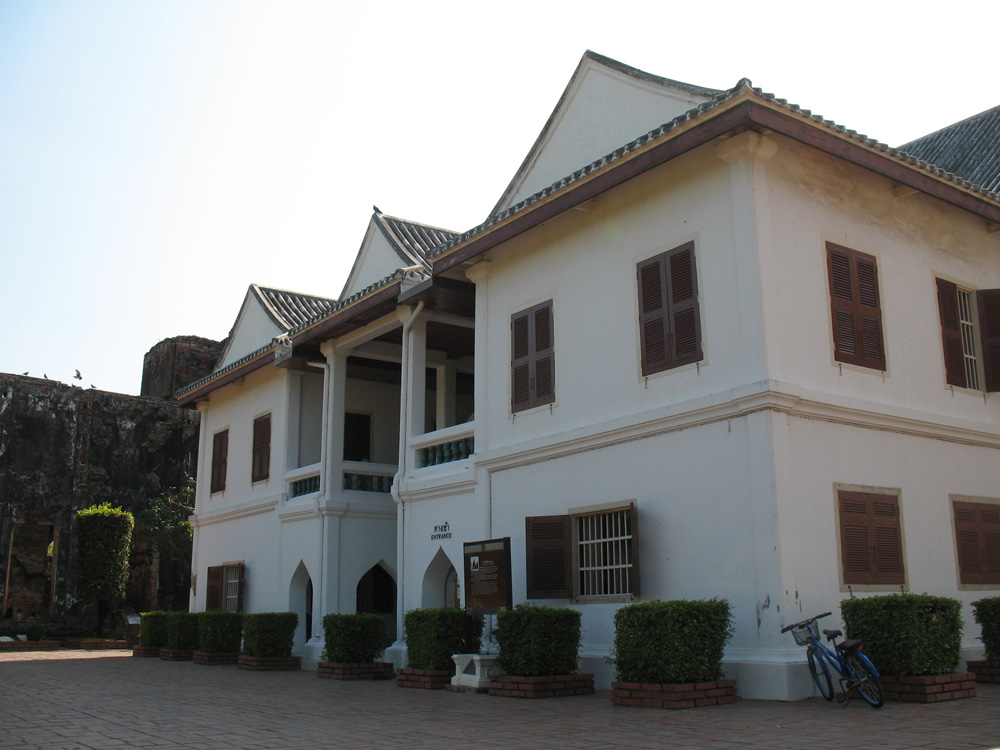
Phiman Mongkut Pavilion'

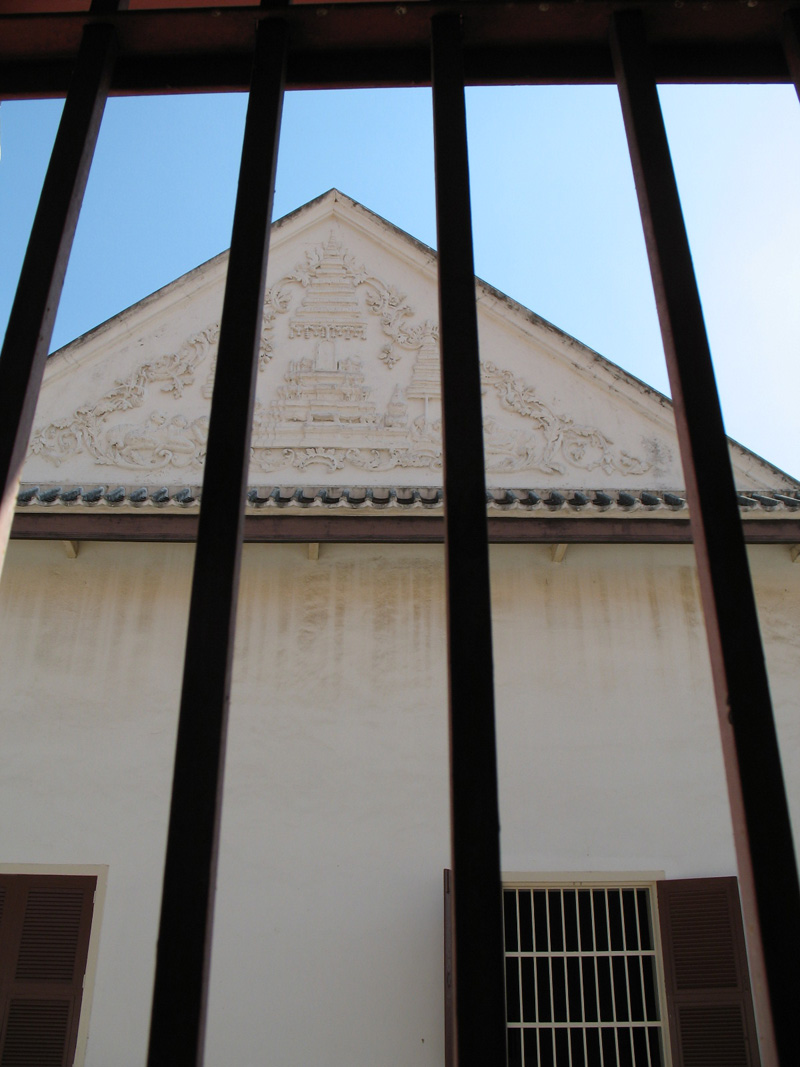
Phiman Mongkut Pavilion, view from Chantara Phisan Hall

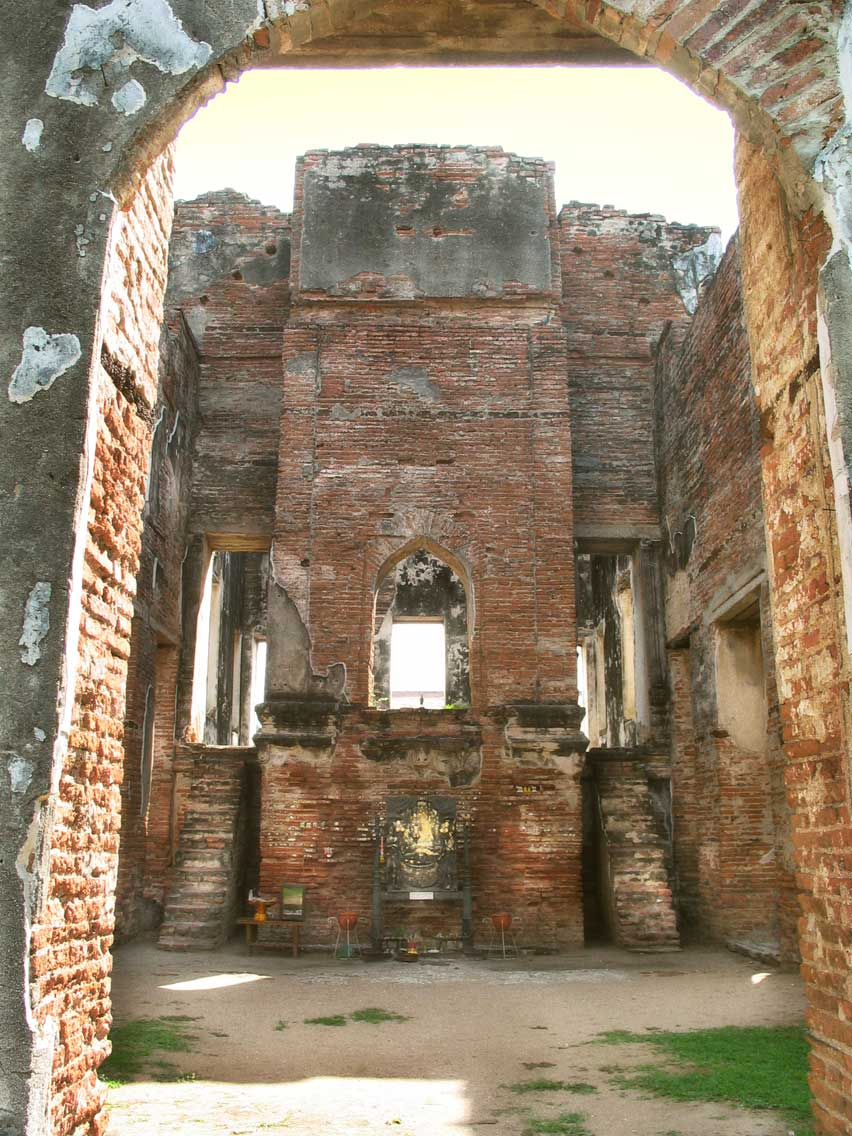
Dusit Sawan hall

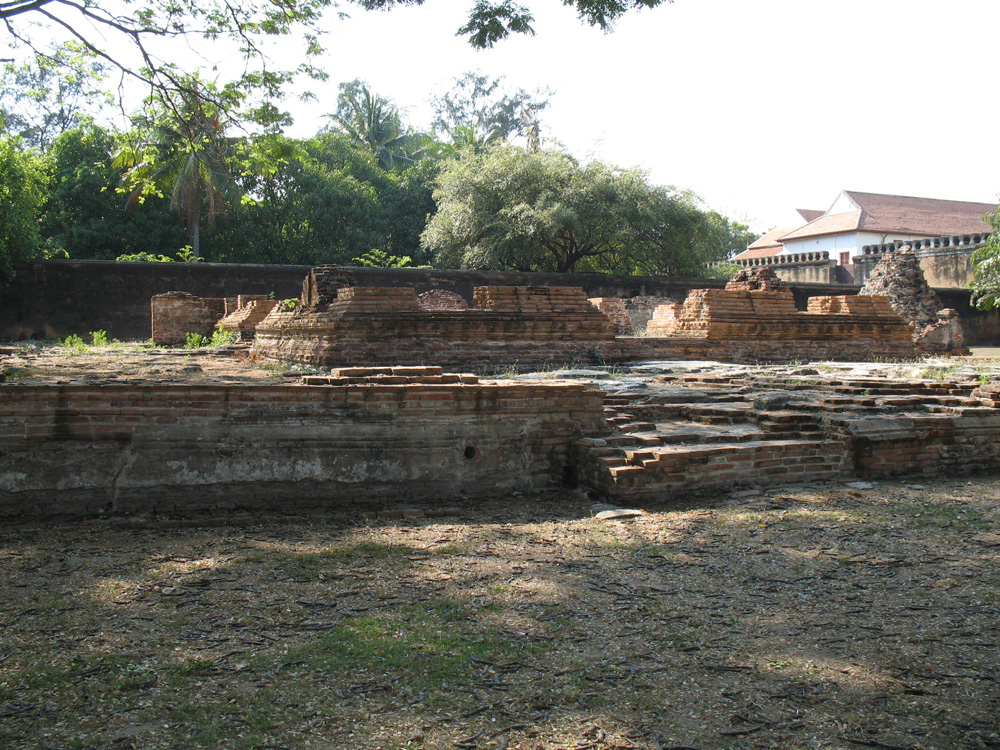
Suthasawan Hall

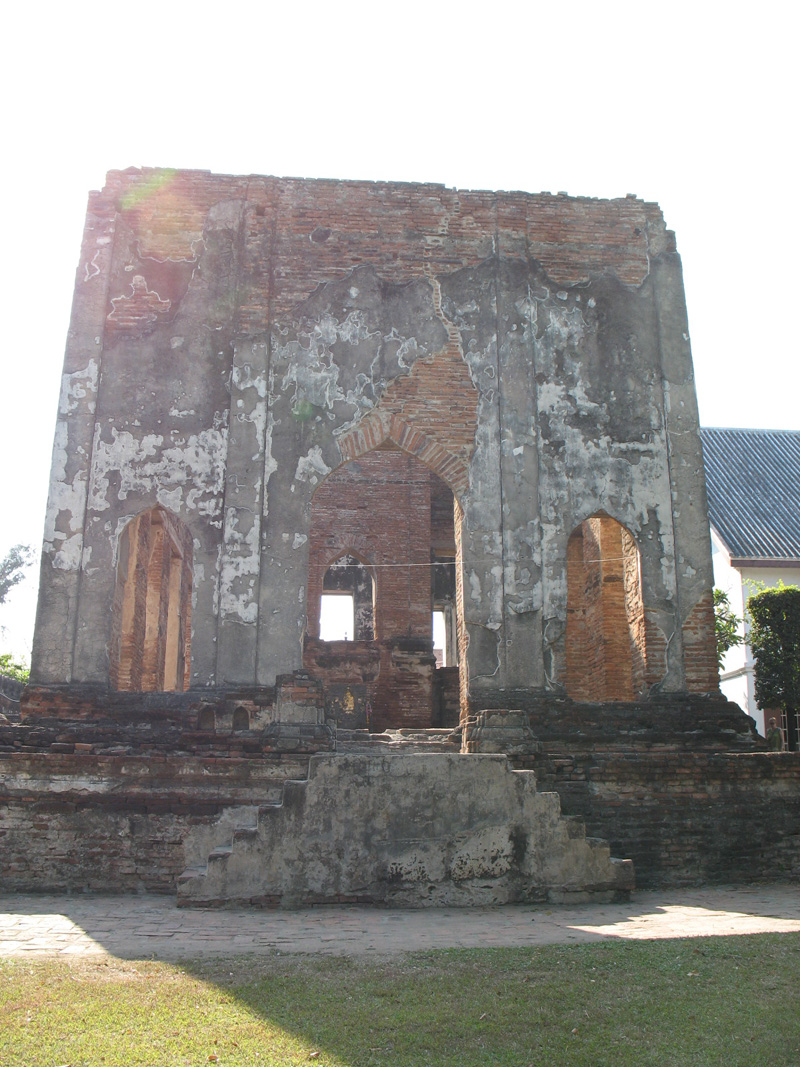
Dusit Sawan Thanya Mahaprasat Hall

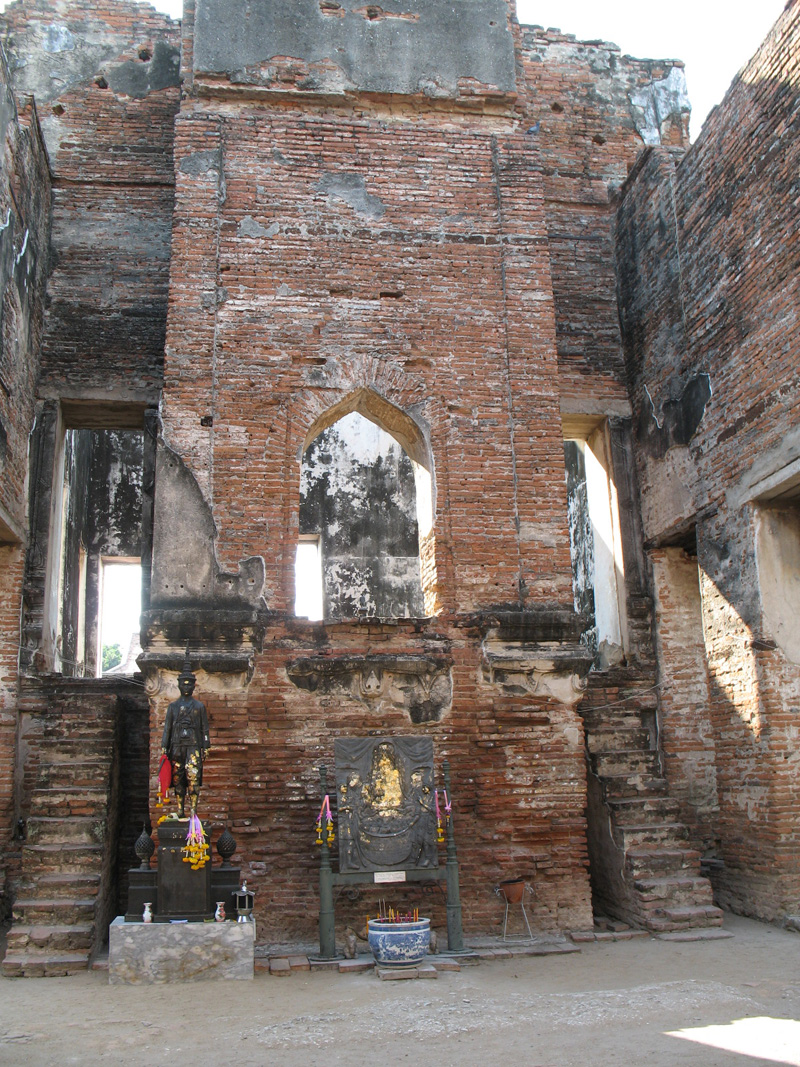
Inside Dusit Sawan Thanya Mahaprasat Hall

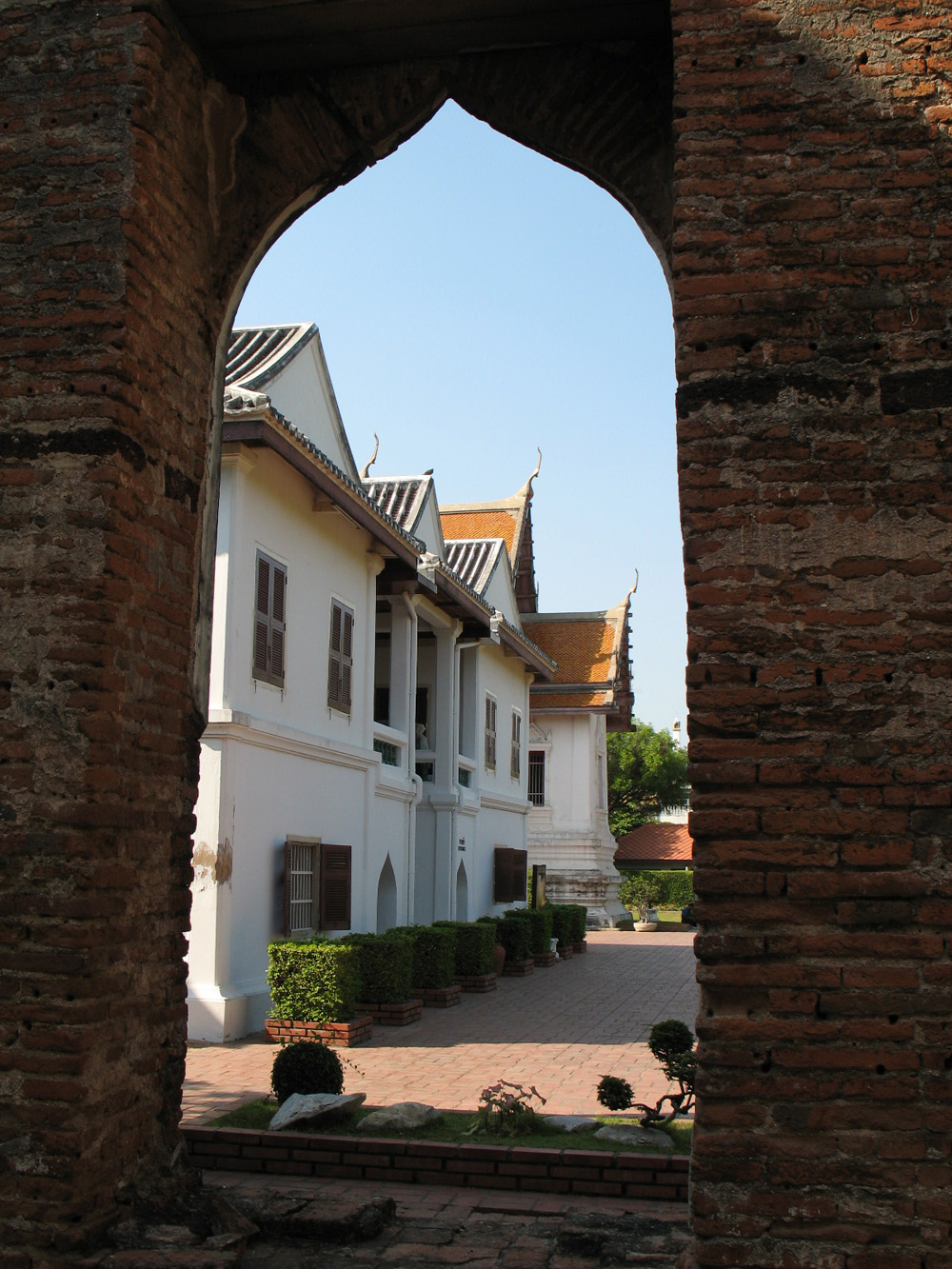
The Palace view, from Dusit Sawan Hall

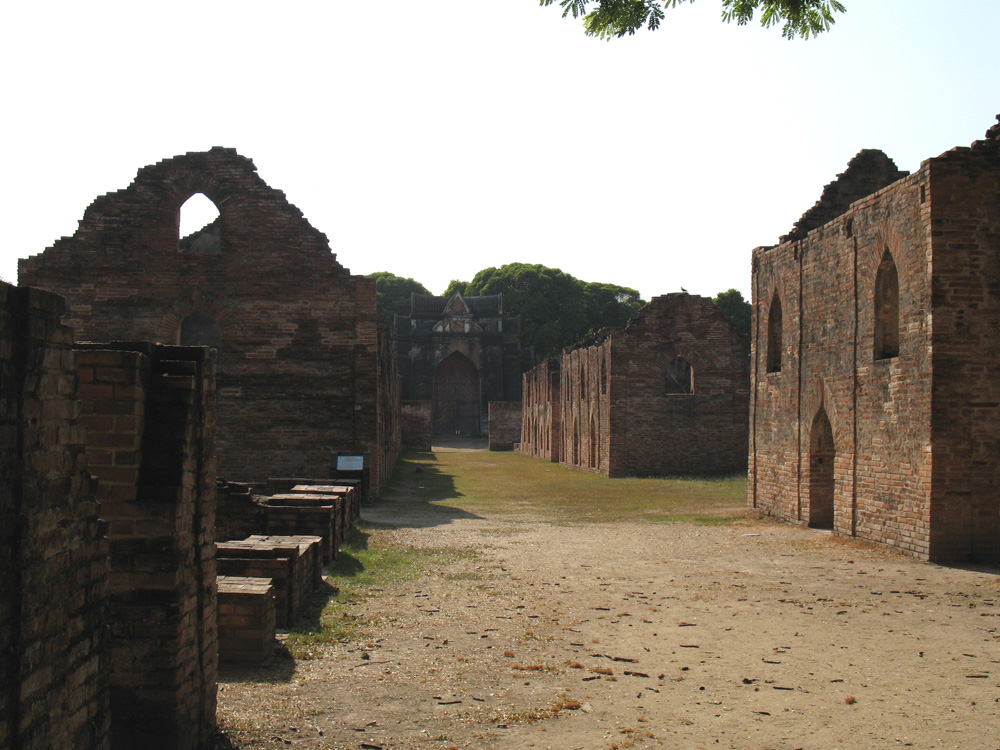
Twelve Royal Storage

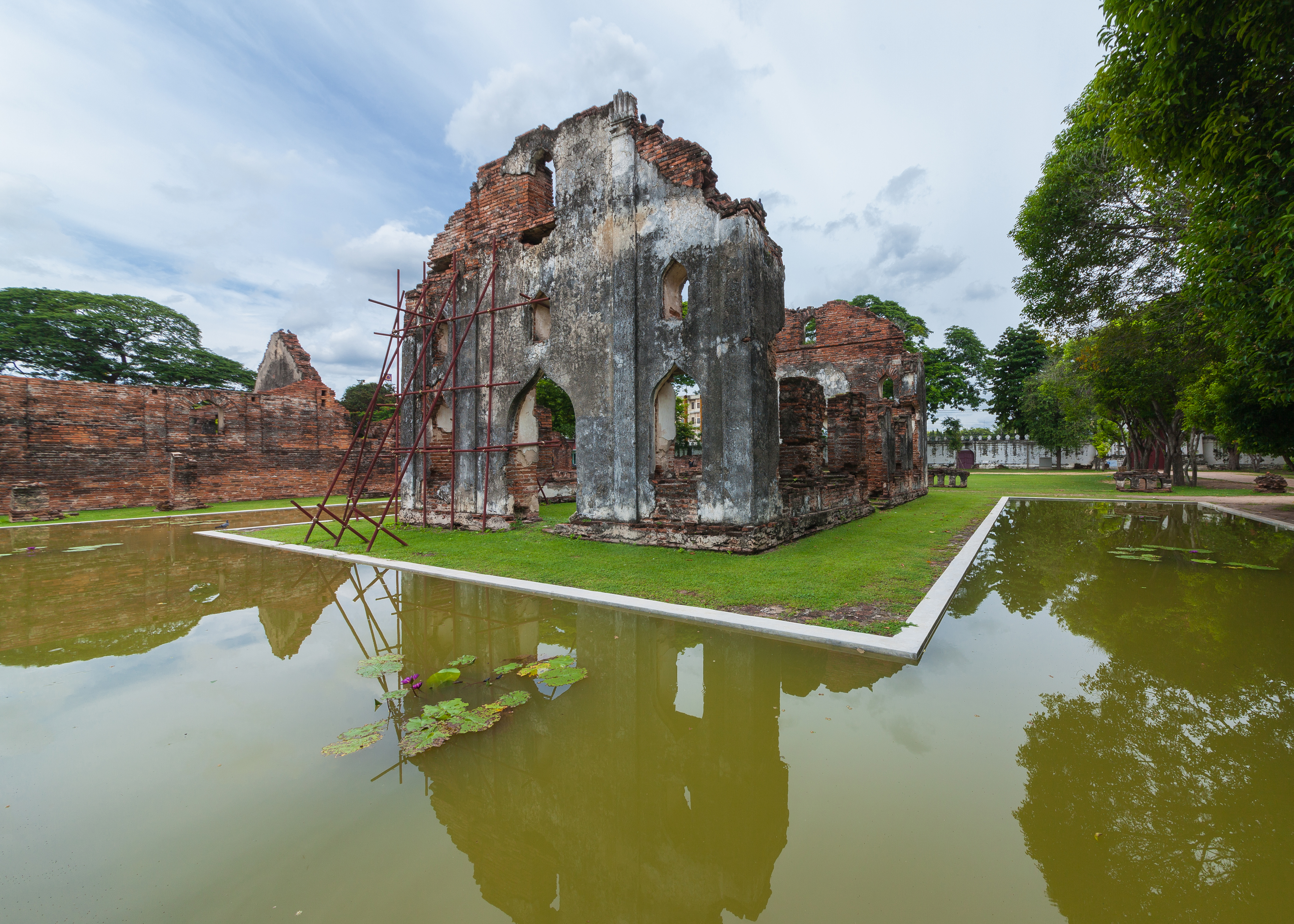
Reception Hall, for Foreign Visitors

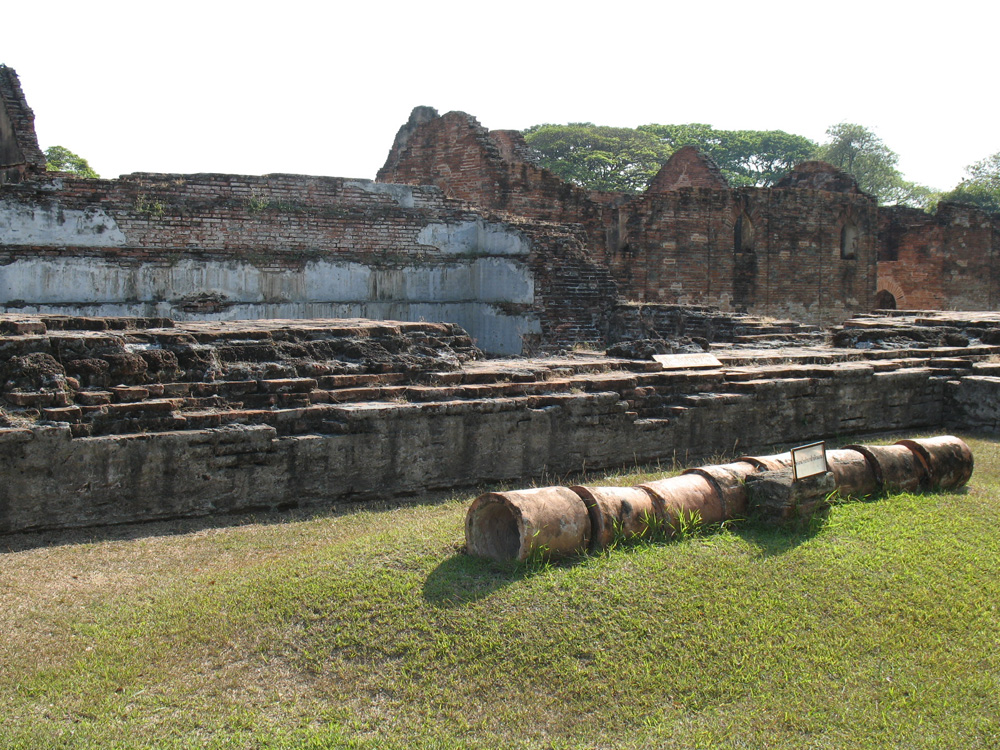
Water Tank

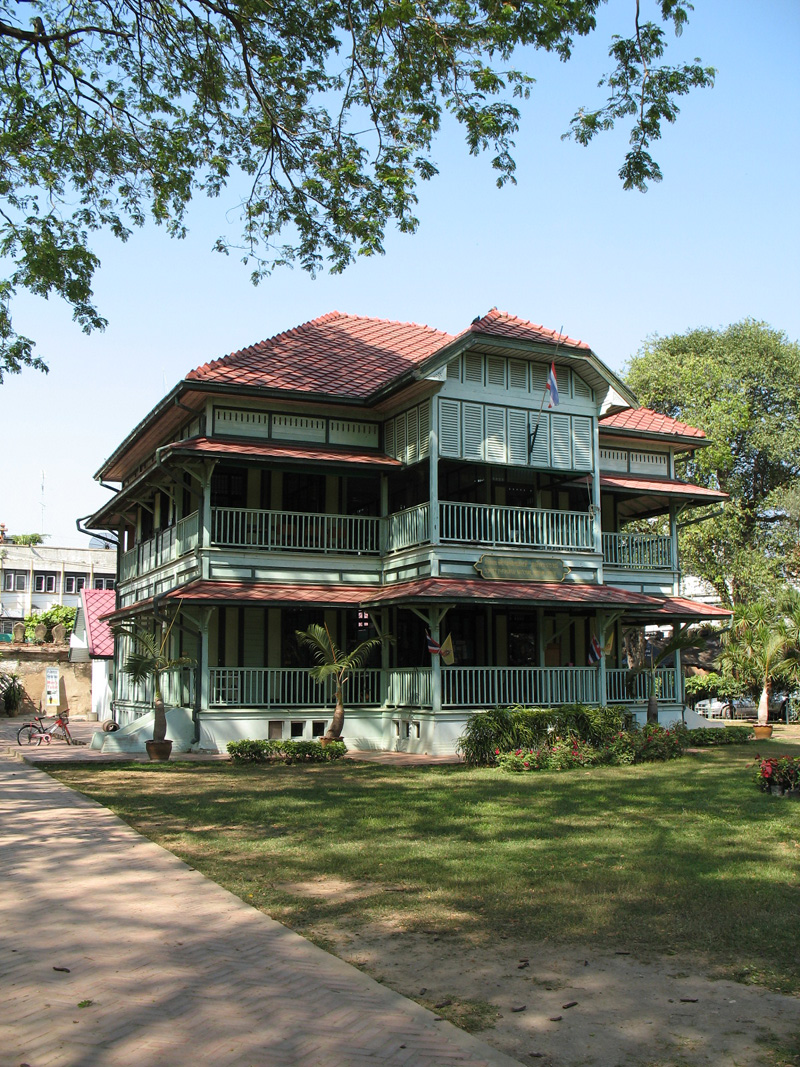
Museum Office

== See also ==
- History of Lopburi
