= Persian embassy to Siam (1685) =

The Persian embassy to Siam (1685) was a diplomatic mission sent by the Safavid Empire under Suleiman I to the Ayutthaya Kingdom under the rule of Narai in the year 1685. The details of this mission can be found in the book Safine-ye Solaymani, which was written by one of the members of the delegation named Mohammad Rabi ibn Mohammad Ebrahim.

The mission reflected the period of political, commercial and cultural influences of the Shia Muslim Persians over Siam during the reign of King Narai (r. 1656–1688), who had earlier ascended the throne through a pivotal military support from the Persians in Ayutthaya. King Narai first sent a diplomatic mission that reached Persia in 1669. More than a decade later, King Narai sent another mission under the Persian nobleman under Siamese service Ḥājjī Salīm Māzandarānī, who reached Isfahan in 1683 and had audiences with Shah Suleiman I. The Safavid court reciprocated by sending a Persian diplomatic mission under Ḥusayn Beg as the chief envoy with Muḥammad Rabī, the author of Safīnah-yi Sulaymānī or "Ship of Sulaimān", as the secretary of the mission. The mission departed from Bandar Abbas in June 1685. Even though the chief envoy Ḥusayn Beg died at Tenasserim, the mission reached Ayutthaya in early 1686. However, by the time of arrival of the mission, the Persian influences on Siam had declined in favor of the French so King Narai received this Persian mission rather anticlimactically. The Persian mission left Siam in January 1687 without achieving any fruitful results, returning to Persia, reaching Bandar Abbas in May 1688.

== Background ==
=== Arrival of the Persians in Siam ===
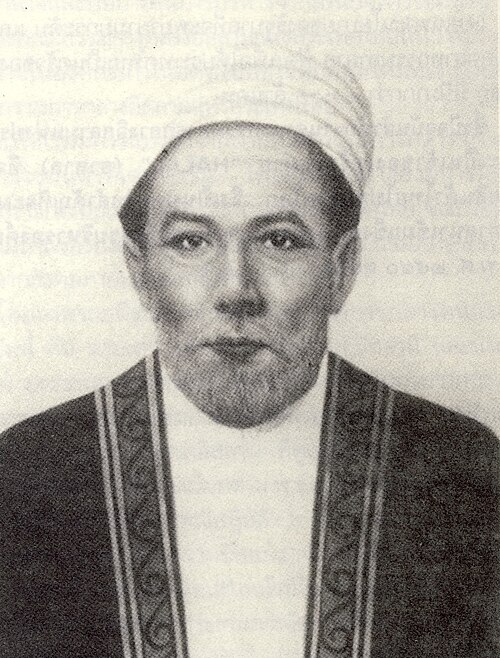
Shaykh Aḥmad Qomi or Okya Baworn Ratchanayok Sheikh Ahmad was the primogenitor of the modern Bunnag and Ahmadchula families.

In the early seventeenth century, the Persians, most of whom were secondary migrants from the Persianized Deccan sultanates of Southern India, called Indo-Iranians, began to arrive in Siam. According to Chronicle of the Bunnag family, a Shia Persian man named "Shaykh Aḥmad Qomi" (Persian: شیخ احمد قمی) or "Shaykh Aḥmad Kuni" or "Sheikh Ahmad", along with his younger brother Muḥammad Sa'īd, arrived in Ayutthaya around early seventeenth century as traders. This Sheikh Ahmad and his brother Muḥammad Sa'īd entered the royal services under King Songtham (r. 1611–1628), during which they supervised the Krom Tha Khwa or Department of the Right Pier, in which Muslims were employed under Siamese bureaucracy to oversee trades with the Muslims. Sheikh Ahmad also became a friend of Okya Si Worawong, a powerful Siamese mandarin during the last years of the reign of Songtham.

After the death of King Songtham in 1628, Okya Si Worawong seized the throne from Songtham's son Chetthathirat in 1629 and took the throne as King Prasat Thong of Ayutthaya, founding the Prasat Thong dynasty that would rule Siam only for about sixty years until 1688. The new king Prasat Thong appointed Sheikh Ahmad as Okphra Chula Ratchamontri the head of the Krom Tha Khwa Right Pier Department, also as Shaykh al-Islām or the head of Islamic communities in Siam. Sheikh Ahmad's brother, Muḥammad Sa'īd, left Siam to return to India at some point. King Prasat Thong had a younger brother, Si Suthammaracha, whom he appointed as Uparaja or heir presumptive. Prasat Thong's eldest son Prince Chai was born to his original wife before Prasat Thong's ascension. Prasat Thong also forcibly took a number of daughters of the late King Songtham as his consorts, one of them bore Prince Narai in 1632.

According to The Ship of Sulaimān, Prince Narai, in his youth, became acquinted with the Persian communities in Ayutthaya. At his death in August 1656, Prasat Thong had not clearly named an heir, resulting in another Ayutthayan dynastic conflict between three contenders; Prasat Thong's younger brother Si Suthammaracha, Prasat Thong's eldest son Prince Chai and the second son Prince Narai. Prince Chai managed to seize the royal palace and claim the throne for himself but the two other contenders, Narai and his uncle Suthammaracha, allied with each other to successfully overthrow and execute Chai shortly after. Narai allowed his uncle Si Suthammaracha to ascend the throne as the new King of Siam, who also appointed Narai as Uparaja or heir presumptive but alliance soon fell apart.

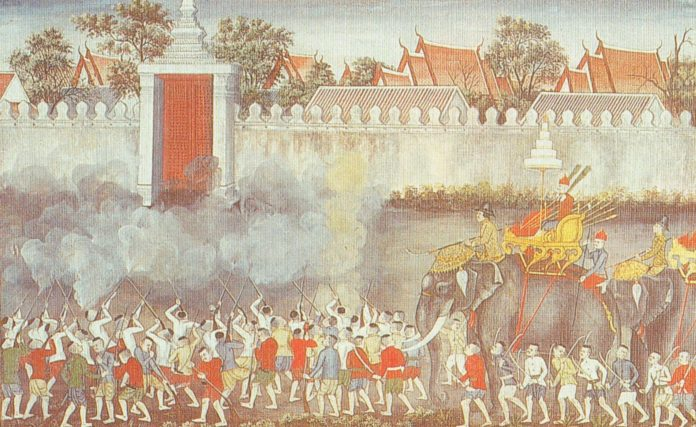
Thai painting from the 1880s depicting King Narai assaulting the Ayutthaya royal palace to claim the throne in October 1656

Political tension between Narai and his uncle King Si Suthammaracha became inevitable. According to Persian account, Narai acted defiantly against his uncle the king without giving any respects. Thai chronicles give the breaking point as when King Suthammaracha stooped to take a younger sister of Narai as his consort, the scheme that she only escaped by hiding in a book chest to be carried out of the palace. Narai became enraged and decided to take the final act. Narai asked for armed support from the Persians, who promised to help Narai gain the throne. On the Āshūrā Day, in October 1656, during which the Persians in Ayutthaya performed the mystery play or Taziyat for the Mourning of Muḥarram. Death of the Imam Ḥusayn ibn Alī in the Battle of Karbala in 680 CE was reenacted with armies carrying weapons into the streets of Ayutthaya to perform.

Prince Narai sneakily had his agent set fire to the King Suthammaracha's royal guard headquarters. While the king's royal guards were busy putting out the fires, Narai led the Persian men, who were performing the Muḥarram, already with guns and cannons, to attack and seize control of the Siamese royal palace. Narai shouted "Oh Alī!" to encourage the Persians. Among Narai's supporters during the assault on the royal palace were the whole troupe of Krom Tha Khwa officials including Okphra Chula Ratchamontri, two Persians with approximate Thai renditions of names Mirza and Mawla. Other foreigners including the Portuguese, the Malays and the Japanese also supported Narai. King Si Suthammaracha could only jump into the river, where he was soon captured and executed by beating with sandalwood club. According to The Ship of Sulaimān, King Narai ascended the throne of Ayutthaya on the 8th of Muḥarramu l-Ḥarām 1068 AH (16 October 1657).

=== Rise of the Persians in Siam ===
At his ascension during 1656–1657, the new king Narai appointed his supporters, among them the Persians, to positions in the Siamese government. According to The Ship of Sulaimān, after his ascension, Narai allocated his personal money to annually sponsor the Taziyat processions of the Muḥarram in Ayutthaya. At ascension of King Narai, the Persians in Ayutthaya numbered to about one hundred individuals. A Persian man from Gilan named 'Abdu'r-Razzāq (Persian: عبدالرزاق) was appointed as Okya Phichit, a trade official under the Phrakhlang ministry. 'Abdu'r-Razzāq became a close confidant of King Narai. Also after his ascension, King Narai sought to bypass the imposition of Dutch monopoly on Siamese export, previously agreed by his father King Prasat Thong, by sending out Chinese merchants to trade at Nagasaki on his behalf.

In 1660, the Qing dynasty forces invaded Burma in search for the Southern Ming pretender Yongli Emperor. The King of Chiang Mai, whose kingdom had been under Burmese suzerainty, fearing Chinese attacks, asked for protection from King Narai of Ayutthaya. King Narai then had to leave Ayutthaya with large armies and a large number of officials to embark on his Northern Campaign in 1661, leaving his regents in Ayutthaya. Okya Phichit 'Abdu'r-Razzāq was put in charge of all Ayutthaya's trade and foreign affairs during Narai's absence. 'Abdu'r-Razzāq, however, mishandled the affair. When the Dutch, who had been dissatisfied with Siamese diplomatic overtures with Koxinga, seized a Siamese trading junk near Hainan in 1661, 'Abdu'r-Razzāq responded by revoking all of the Dutch trading monopoly and privileges in Siam and sent Koxinga's Chinese supporters to attack the Dutch factory in Ayutthaya. When King Narai returned from his Northern Campaign in 1663, Narai was angry at 'Abdu'r-Razzāq's handling of the Dutch affair. 'Abdu'r-Razzāq was imprisoned and soon died.

Even though 'Abdu'r-Razzāq had been punished, the Dutch–Siamese relations had reached the breaking point and the Dutch decided that this conflict would be settled by force. Joan Maetsuycker the Governor-General of the Dutch East Indies sent three Dutch warships to impose naval blockade on Ayutthaya in October 1663. King Narai eventually capitulated and was forced to sign the Dutch–Siamese Treaty of August 1664, in which Siam gave commercial concessions to the Dutch East India Company. After the blockade, King Narai sought to counter-balance the Dutch influence.

After the downfall of 'Abdu'r-Razzāq, another Persian man Āqā Muḥammad from Astarābād, also called Āqā Muḥammad Astarābādī (Persian: آقا محمد استرآبادی), was appointed by King Narai as Okphra Si Naowarat (Thai: ออกพระศรีเนาวรัตน์) as the leader of the Persian communities in Siam. Āqā Muḥammad was said to be a son of Muḥammad Sa'īd who had returned to India. Muḥammad Sa'īd was the younger brother of Sheikh Ahmad, who died in Siam before Narai's ascension to the throne. Despite his father returning to India, Āqā Muḥammad came to Siam around the 1640s and had known Narai before his ascension to the throne.

It was during the time of this Āqā Muḥammad Astarābādī that King Narai and the Siamese court underwent "Iranian Revolution" and gravitated Siam towards the Persian world. Rise and presence of Āqā Muḥammad in Siamese royal court marked the apogee of Persian influences in Siam. It was also during this apex of Persian influences that Siam began to make diplomatic overtures to the Persianate world. During the Dutch blockade of Ayutthaya, King Narai sent a diplomatic mission across the Bay of Bengal to establish relations with the Sultanate of Golconda, whose rulers were Persianate, in 1664.

Mohammad Rabi, in his The Ship of Sulaimān, portrayed the Siamese king Narai as an extreme Iranophile. Narai reportedly ate Persian food, wore Persian clothes and hired Persian guards. Narai also tucked an Iranian-style dagger at his waist but refused to wear turban because it was too heavy. Mohammad Rabi gave account of and praised Āqā Muḥammad as follows;

It is more than evident from his works and deeds that he was a man of noble character. He possessed the laudable manners and fine integrity of a truly well-bred man. He is originally from Astarābād, the abode of the faithful. Wise and loyal, and a man of practical skill, trained in the school of experience, he originally settled in Siam to carry on trade. After learning the language and customs of that domain he rose to position of authority and became a minister and favored councilor of the king.

Under dominance of Āqā Muḥammad Astarābādī, many Persians rose to high positions in the Siamese royal court. Āqā Muḥammad encouraged immigration of his fellow Persians from Southern India to be employed in Siam. These Persians were secondary migrants, being originally from Astarābād and Māzandāran on the shores of Caspian Sea. In this period, Āqā Muḥammad recruited about two hundred Persians from India to Ayutthaya. The Siamese called the Persians Khaek Ma-ngon, with Khaek being the Thai ethnic term for Muslims or Indians and Ma-ngon being from "Mughal" (Persian: moġol مغول "Mongol") as most of the Persians had come from India. The Persians were also called Khaek Chao Sen, with Chao Sen being the Imam Hussein, denoting the unique Muḥarram religious practice of the Persians.

=== First Siamese diplomatic mission to Persia (1668–1669) ===
In 1665, during the high period of Persian cultural influence under Āqā Muḥammad Astarābādī in the Siamese royal court, King Narai of Ayutthaya dispatched a diplomatic mission to Safavid Persia. The Siamese court officially informed the Dutch VOC establishment in Ayutthaya about the Siamese plan to send three envoys to Persia, asking for Dutch assistance. The Dutch opperhoofd in Ayutthaya was Enoch Poolvoet. According to Dutch record, in December 1665, the three envoys from Ayutthaya to Persia, one of them was a Persian named Haji Nura (Hagie Noera), had already been in Dutch Malacca on their journey to Persia, carrying gifts to the Persian Shah. To fund their mission to Persia, the Siamese envoys took a loan of 1,103 guilders from the Dutch VOC at Malacca. Poolvoet informed his counterpart Huybert de Lairesse the VOC director to Safavid Persia in Gamron or Gombroon (Bandar Abbas) in May 1665 about the Siamese mission. Huybert de Lairesse was astonished about the incoming Siamese diplomatic mission to Persia and considered the Siamese to be unfamiliar with the Persian etiquette and customs, fearing that this affair would embarrass the Dutch.

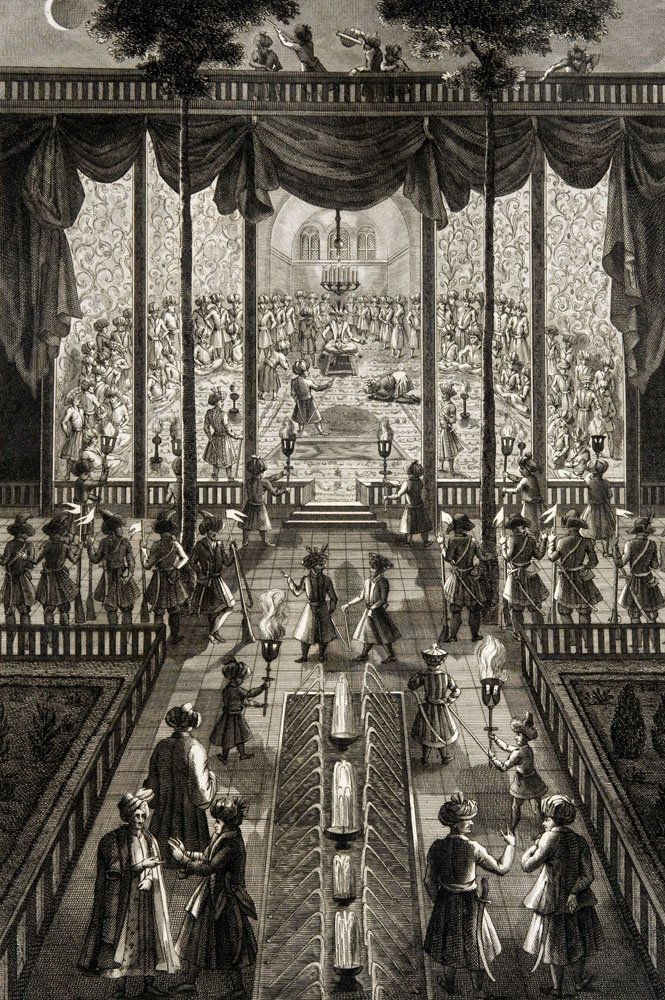
Enthronement of Shah Safi II in October 1666 in Isfahan, the Shah was later enthroned for the second time as Suleiman I in March 1668.

Embarkation of Siamese envoys on their mission to Persia coincided with the last years of the reign of Shah Abbas II of Persia. When Shah Abbas II died in October 1666, his nineteen-year-old son Sām Mirzā ascended the throne as Shah Safi II of Persia. However, the young new Shah of Persia was not influential and the actual powers laid in the hands of some military commanders. Early in the reign of Safi II, inauspicious events occurred in Persia including the near-fatal illness of the Shah himself in mid-1666 and the general drought and crop failures during 1666–1667. In November 1667, a powerful earthquake struck at Shirvan (1667 Shamakhi earthquake), killing around 50,000 people. These events were regarded as misfortunes and the Safavid court decided to hold the second enthronement ceremony for the young Shah in March 1668 at Chehel Sotoun in Isfahan. The Shah, formerly known as Safi II, took the new reigning name as Shah Suleiman I of Persia.

The Siamese diplomatic mission, despite being in Malacca in 1665, only departed from Malacca in February 1668, boarding on the ship Selamat Darani commanded by a Nakhoda. The ship carried Siamese products including 4,000 piculs of sappanwood, 375 piculs of tin, dried areca nuts, sandalwood, black ebony wood, pepper, camphor, elephant tusks, fine porcelain, tamarind, indigo and Bengal textile. Gifts intended for the Persian Shah were ninety-four Siamese-style lacquered cabinets and chests. The Selamat Darani carried the Persian-Siamese envoys, the gifts and the products to Portuguese Goa, where they sheltered during the seasonal monsoon. From Goa, the Selamat Darani sailed into the Gulf of Oman but encountered a severe storm. The masts and the yards of the Selamat Darani were heavily damaged as the ship had to take an emergency landing in Muscat, the port city of the Imamate of Oman, in 1669.

Oman and Portugal had been at war since the sixteenth century. After the Omani capture of Muscat in 1650, Oman and Portugal targeted each other's trade network in the Arabian Sea, plundering ships and seizing merchandises. In 1668, the Portuguese in Goa were planning to attack Muscat. When the ship Selamat Darani carrying the gifts from King Narai intending for the Persian Shah landed in Muscat, the Omani authorities seized control of the ship because it came from Portuguese Goa. The Omanis held the ship Selamat Darani and the cargo for a ransom. The Siamese envoys left the ship and the gifts at Muscat to enter the Straits of Hormuz and arrive in Bandar Abbas to ask for assistance from the local Persian shahbandar. A Siamese envoy wrote a letter in Thai language asking for help but no one could understand it. The Persian shahbandar asked both Isbrand Godske the director of Dutch VOC factory and Stephen Flower the representative of English East India Company in Bandar Abbas to write letters to Muscat urging the Omanis to release the Siamese cargo.

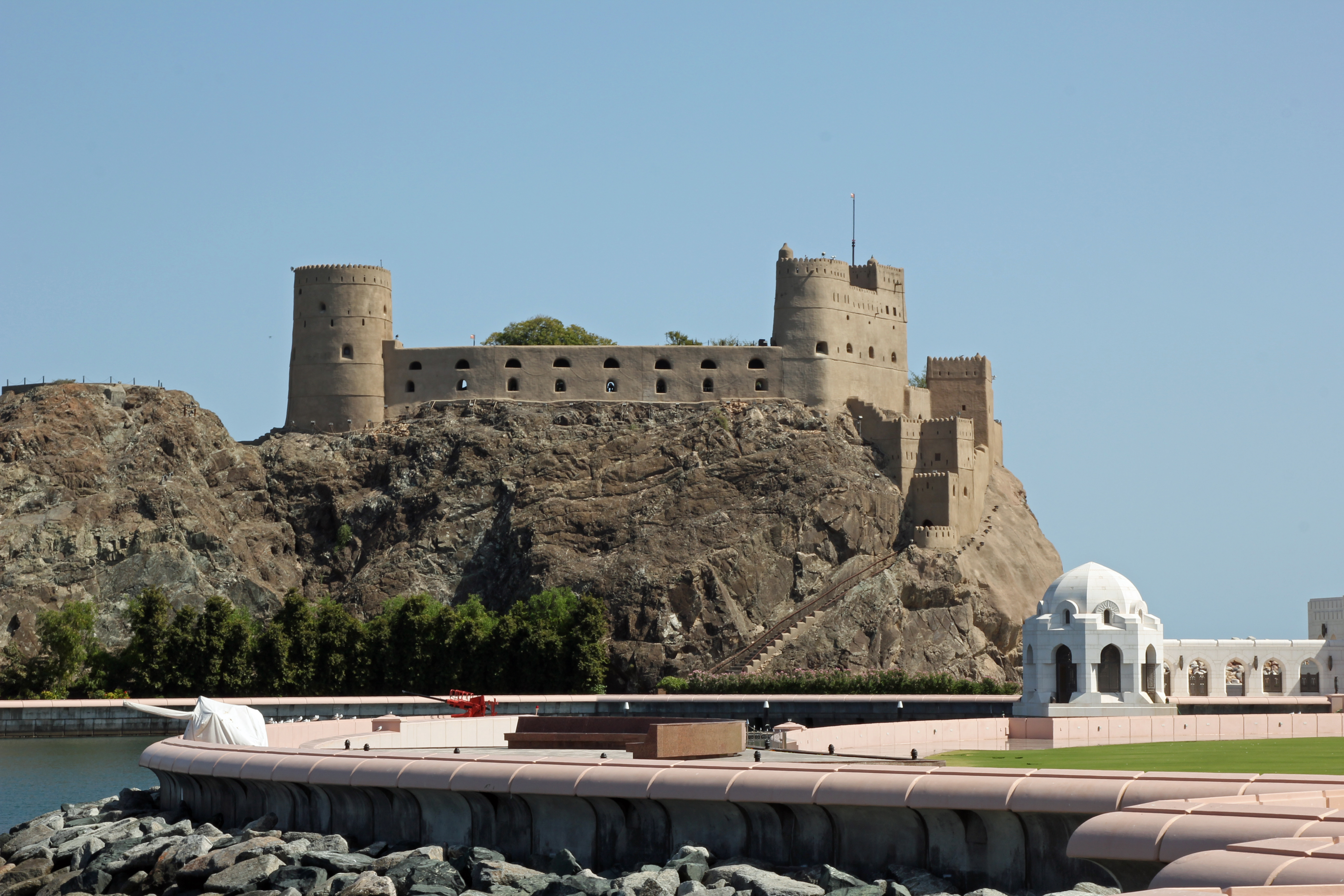
Al Jalali Fort in Old Muscat

The Siamese envoys eventually reached Isfahan around April or May 1669. The details of Persian reception of this Siamese diplomatic mission did not survive. It was unknown whether the Persian Shah Suleiman I actually received the Siamese envoys. At Isfahan, the Siamese took another loan of 300 Iranian toman from the VOC for the Siamese cargo were still being held by the Omani Arabs. Also in April 1669, through Dutch and English intervention, the Omanis decided to release the Siamese cargo but keep the ship Selamat Darani and the weapons, which would be used in their future wars against the Portuguese. The Siamese envoys left Persia at Bandar Kong around June 1669 on a Muslim merchant ship to Surat, thus ending the first-known Siamese diplomatic mission to Persia. It was also not known whether the Siamese gifts to the Persian Shah were actually delivered. King Narai repaid the loan taken by the Siamese envoys from the Dutch through rice loaded on two Dutch merchant ships in late 1669.

=== Pinnacle of Persian influences on Siam ===
Two French missionaries Pierre Lambert de la Motte and François Pallu, founders of the Paris Foreign Missions Society, arrived in Ayutthaya in 1662 and 1664, respectively, to pursue Catholic proselytization in Vietnam. King Narai granted a land in Ayutthaya for these French missionaries to build the Seminary of Saint Joseph in 1665. After the Dutch blockade of Ayutthaya during 1663–1664, King Narai sought out for other powers to counter the Dutch influences. François Pallu returned to Europe in 1665, informing both Pope Clement IX and King Louis XIV of France that King Narai was tolerant of the Christians, urging both of them to issue letters to the King of Siam to secure the position of the French Catholic mission in Siam. Pope Clement IX and King Louis XIV then wrote letters to King Narai, assigning Pallu to bring these letters to the King of Siam. De la Motte in Ayutthaya also wrote to Pallu in Paris that Narai was interested in Christianity and could possible be converted, also suggesting that France should send a diplomatic mission to Siam.

At the pinnicle of Persian cultural influence over King Narai, the Siamese king reportedly wore Persian robes and slippers in Safavid style and the Persian costume became a fashion among the Siamese nobility. As the Dutch had imposed trade monopoly on King Narai in his trade with Tokugawa Japan, Narai worked with the Persians, especially Āqā Muḥammad Astarābādī, who owned junks and dispatched Chinese trading junks to trade at Macau and Nagasaki on behalf of Narai, to evade and counterweight Dutch monopolistic ambitions. Narai also shifted his trade to the Bay of Bengal side. Narai had earlier established relations with the Sultanate of Golconda in 1664 and appointed a resident commercial agent to Masulipatam, the trading port of Golconda. Persian and Muslim Tamil (known as the Chulias) merchants brought Siamese products from Tenasserim, including elephants and tin, to transverse the Bay of Bengal to trading cities of the Coromandel Coast in exchange for Indian textiles, which they imported to Siam.

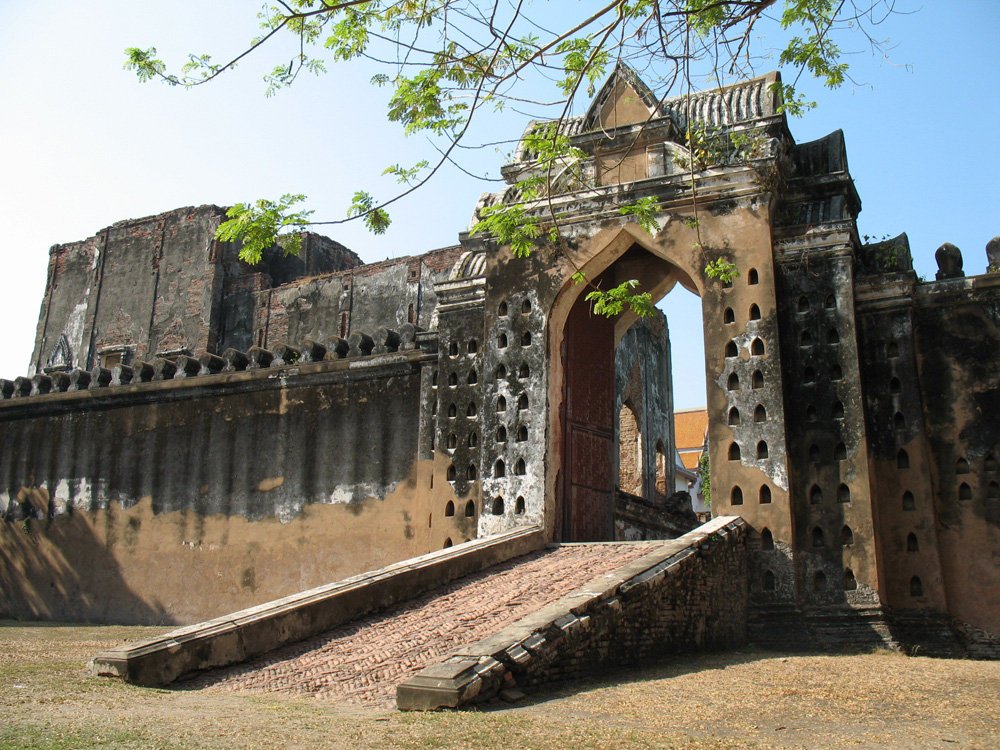
In the early 1670s, King Narai constructed the new Lopburi Palace at Lopburi as a detached palace, apparently with Persian architectural influences.

Around 1670, King Narai began to spend some time at Lopburi or Lavo, about 50 kilometers north of Ayutthaya. Narai developed Lopburi as his second capital as a retreat from political intrigues and the demanding nobles at Ayutthaya. Narai ordered construction of the Lopburi Palace, which was built in Persian architectural style and was probably designed by Persian architects. Pointed arches on doors and windows of the palace came from the Persianate Deccan sultanates. The palace also included a Persian-style garden and a grape garden. Narai spent about four to five months a year at his new Lopburi Palace. Narai continued to pursue trade with Persia after the Siamese mission of 1668–1669. The Dutch VOC recorded a Siamese official Okluang Siwichai Wathit (Olang Siwetsjawatit) conducting trade in Bandar Abbas on behalf of the King of Siam in 1672 and 1673.

It was during the apex of Persian influences in Siam that the French began to diplomatically advance on Siam. François Pallu returned to Siam, reaching Ayutthaya in May 1673 with another French missionary Louis Laneau, who would soon become the first Apostolic Vicar of Siam. The three French missionaries, Pallu, De la Motte and Laneau presented the royal letter of Louis XIV and the papal letter of Clement IX to the Siamese king Narai in a solemn ceremony in October 1673. Narai declared that he would send a diplomatic mission to France but was prevented by conflicts among European powers including the Franco-Dutch War and the Third Anglo-Dutch War, which also possibly disrupted Narai's trade with Persia.

The Siamese port of Mergui on the Tenasserim Coast was the main channel of the Siamese trade with India and Persia. Narai appointed the Muslim Persians as governors of cities along the whole route from Mergui to Ayutthaya including Mergui itself, Tenasserim, Kuiburi, Pranburi, Phetchaburi and Thonburi (Bangkok). The governor of Bangkok was a Turkish man from Bursa named Çelebi, who converted to Shiite Islam. In 1676, at the suggestion of Āqā Muḥammad, Narai appointed Mohammed Beg and Ismael Beg the two Muslim Indian Chulia brothers as governors of the tin-rich towns of Thalang (Phuket) and Bangkhli (modern Takua Thung), respectively.

The 1670s was the peak period of Persian influences over King Narai of Siam under leadership of Okphra Si Naowarat Āqā Muḥammad Astarābādī as the head of Persian communities in Siam. Āqā Muḥammad, however, had also been in a political rivalry with Kosa Lek the Phrakhlang or Siamese Minister of Trade and Foreign Affairs. In 1672, the Dutch VOC in Ayutthaya had to split presents into two halves, with one half going to Kosa Lek and the other half going to Āqā Muḥammad. The Persians also introduced English country traders to join in their trade across the Bay of Bengal, most notably with brothers George White and Samuel White, who entered Siamese service as King Narai's commander of royal trading ships between Mergui and Masulipatam.

=== Decline of Persian influences in Siam ===
According to The Ship of Sulaimān, Āqā Muḥammad unevenly distributed salaries to the Persian guards he had hired from Southern India, favoring his associates. Some jealous Persian guards complained to King Narai about this unfairness. Narai then considered Āqā Muḥammad corrupted for making Narai pay double to some Persian guards and punished Āqā Muḥammad with death penalty in 1678, in spite of long-time friendship and cooperation, perhaps Narai feared Āqā Muḥammad becoming too powerful politically and commercially. Narai ordered the mouth of Āqā Muḥammad sewn shut. The exact nature of his death was not well-recorded but Āqā Muḥammad Astarābādī had been dead by 1679.

In 1678, the Siamese official Okluang Siwichai Wathit was in Bandar Abbas trading for King Narai again. Death of Āqā Muḥammad coincided with the arrival of the English merchant Richard Burnaby from English East India Company (EIC) and his translator Constantine Phaulkon, a Greek adventurer, in Ayutthaya in 1678. In November 1679, George White wrote about the dominance of the Persians and the Muslims over the trade between the Siamese Tenasserim Coast and the Coromandel Coast across the Bay of Bengal. These Persians had settled in Mergui and Tenasserim in great numbers and ended up far richer than the natives;

This considerable trade is att present totally engrossed by the Persians & Moores, who are now in effect masters of that parte of the country as well as commerce, which they are bound to acknowledge to the kindness of the premencioned Uphra Synnoratt [Okphra Si Naowarat], who for 30 years together that hee was of this King's Cabinett Councell made it his chiefe endeavor, even to his own personal prejudice, to promote the interest of his countrymen and those of the Mohameten religion, wherein hee so farr succeed that the colonies they have planted in those partes doe almost equall the number of the natives, but far exceed them in wealth and power

Death of Āqā Muḥammad Astarābādī left Kosa Lek in more control over Siam's international trade and also left the Persians in Siam in disarray. Many Persians contended over the position Āqā Muḥammad had left. King Narai appointed a Persian man from Shūshtar as the new Okphra Si Naowarat or leader of the Persians in Siam but he was soon assassinated by another Persian from Khurāsān who wanted the same position. Two sons of Āqā Muḥammad, Chū Chī and Chū Kīā, were not effective and influential enough to inherit their father's position and powers. A faction of Persians in Ayutthaya even pushed for executions of Chū Chī and Chū Kīā but Narai refused, saying that he had raised the two boys himself. After this, there were no Persians in Ayutthaya deserved the position of leadership as King Narai appointed none. According to Mohammad Rabi, in his The Ship of Sulaimān, any Iranians of capabilities in Siam refused government positions out of fear of jealousy from their fellow countrymen. Iranians sent abroad by King Narai fell into debauchery and never returned to Siam, causing Narai to rely on a "Frank" instead, referring to Constatine Phaulkon.

Richard Burnaby the EIC representative in Siam decided to implant his subordinate Constantine Phaulkon into Siamese bureaucracy itself to secure benefits for the English. Burnaby assigned Constantine Phaulkon to give twenty catties of money to Kosa Lek the Siamese Minister of Trade in 1680, entrusting Phaulkon into service under Kosa Lek, who had been battling political influence of the Persians for many years. According to Jesuit priest Claude de Bèze, Kosa Lek sidelined the Persians by assigning Phaulkon instead of a Persian official to go on a trading venture to Persia in 1680 on behalf of King Narai. Phaulkon's commercial venture to Persia in 1680 was a profitable and successful one, impressing both Kosa Lek and King Narai, leading to Narai asking to see this new Greek man. Kosa Lek soon introduced Phaulkon to King Narai in 1681, thus beginning the precipitous rise of Phaulkon to power as the new confidante of the Siamese king, making a name in Thai history.

King Narai was reportedly impressed by Constantine Phaulkon's wisdom and knowledge since their first conversation in 1681. Phaulkon left the English East India Company to enter Siamese bureaucracy, being appointed to the Siamese title of Okluang Ritthi Kamhaeng (Thai: ออกหลวงฤทธิกำแหง). Phaulkon also had qualities reminiscent of the late Āqā Muḥammad, effectively replacing the latter as Narai's main assistant of foreign origin. The Ship of Sulaimān gave a very negative assessment of Phaulkon, reflecting the general view of the Persians and Muslims in Siam on this new rising "Christian infidel" figure who sought to undo Muslim dominance over Siamese trades.

The Frank minister has succeeded in penetrating into the king's affection to such an extent, by means of shrewd trickery, that there is never a moment in public or in private when he is not at the king's side. To the world at large this Christian minister displays a record of service, integrity, thrift and sincerity and makes every effort to increase the state revenues and cut down expenses.

However, it is a fact that every year he sends huge sums of money from the king's treasury abroad to the Frank kingdoms, supposedly for business purposes. Up until now [1685] there have been absolutely no visible returns from that money.

In accord with the spirit of hatred which exists between Islam and the infidels, the Christian minister is ever competing with Muslims for upper hand and in accord with, "If you give help to a wicked person, God soon arouses that man against you", the Frank has tried to drive the Iranians out. By way of harming their reputation he is always on the lookout to expose their improper deeds and find some sign of their disloyalty to the king.

=== Second Siamese diplomatic mission to Persia (1682–1684) ===
As the wars between European nations subsided, King Narai of Ayutthaya began to send out Siamese diplomatic missions to foreign countries. In 1680, King Narai appointed the Siamese envoy Okya Phiphatkosa on a diplomatic mission to France, boarding on the French East India Company ship Soleil d'Orient. Also in late 1681, Narai sent his Persian official Hāji Salim Māzandarāni (Persian: حاجی سلیم مازندرانی, from Māzandāran, called "Agi Selim" in La Loubère's Du royaume de Siam) as the Siamese envoy to renew friendship with Persia. The Ship of Sulaimān stated that King Narai had sent many diplomatic missions to Persia but they were either drowned, lost or seized by the pirates. King Narai wrote a letter to the Shah Suleiman, saying that he wished the Persian–Siamese relations to be flourishing and long-lasting, also sending valuable commodities to the Shah including sappanwood, tin, elephant tusks and sugar. Meanwhile, King Louis XIV of France also appointed François Picquet as the French envoy to Persia in 1681 to secure protection of French Catholic missionaries in Persia.

Hāji Salim the envoy to Persia departed from Siam around late 1681 with his ship commanded by the Nakhoda Okkhun Masili Khan (Con Masilichan) going into the Bay of Bengal. However, the ship suffered from damages and had to anchor at Dutch Ceylon to be repaired. The Dutch VOC in Ceylon paid 7,200 silver pieces to repair this Siamese diplomatic vessel. Also in late 1681, the French ship Soleil d'Orient carrying the Siamese envoy Okya Phiphatkosa to France shipwrecked off the coast of Madagascar. After Ceylon, Hāji Salim continued his journey to Cochin on the Malabar Coast, where he purchased three piculs of cloves to give to the Shah. Hāji Salim eventually arrived at Bandar Abbas on 23 January 1682, when the Dutch record mentioned arrival of an ethnic Persian ambassador from Siam. In Bandar Abbas, Hāji Salim expected the Persian authorities to receive him with pomp ceremonies and gun salutes but the Persian officials considered Hāji Salim to be an ordinary Persian man rather than a full-honor foreign envoy. Hāji Salim stayed in Bandar Abbas at least until March 1682.

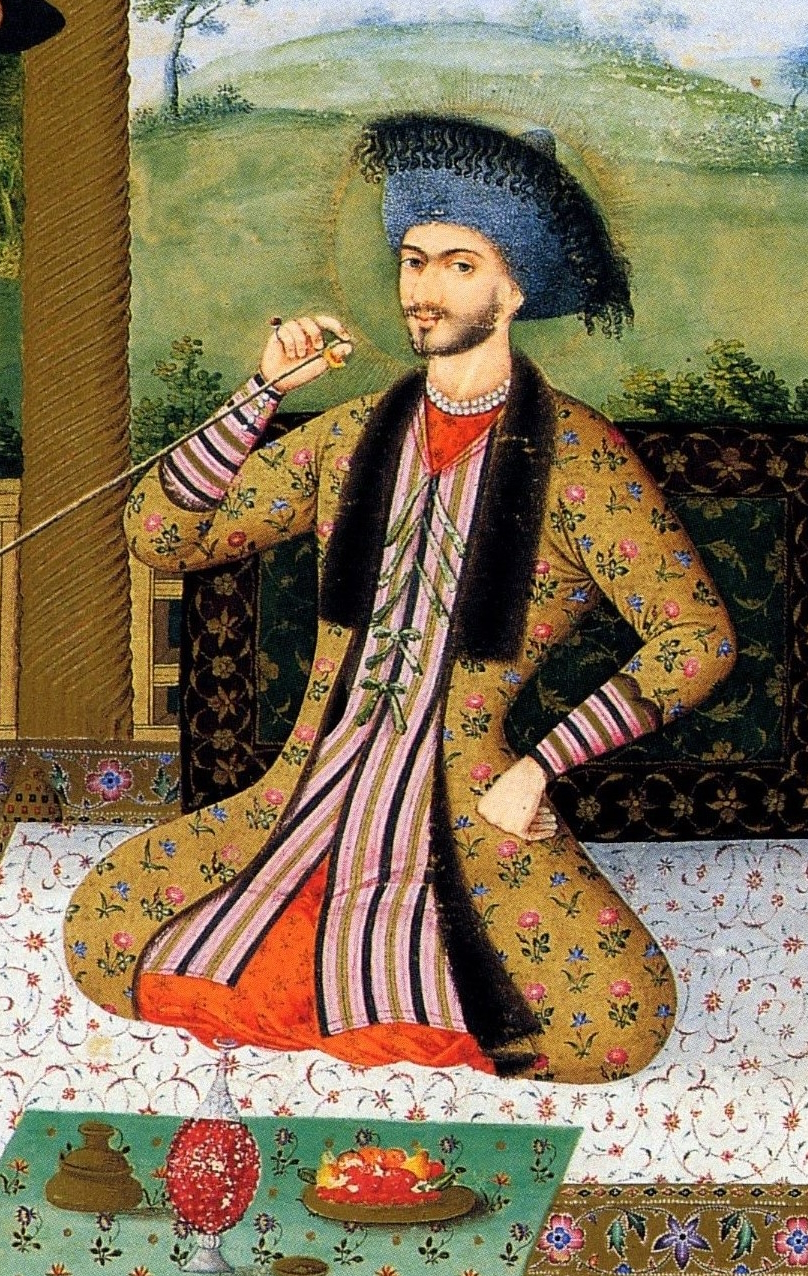
Portrait (1670) of Shah Suleiman I of Safavid Persia by Aliquli Jabbadar

The Shah Suleiman, 34 years old, did not rule personally, relegating power and duties to the Grand Vizier Shaykh Ali Khan Zanganeh. King Louis XIV wrote a letter to Shah Suleiman of Persia, asking the Shah to protect the Catholics. The French envoy François Picquet, going through Nakhchivan, brought Louis XIV's letter to reach Isfahan in July 1682. Hāji Salim the Siamese envoy reached Isfahan some time in 1682. According to Picquet, Shah Suleiman granted audience to the envoys from many nations in Isfahan on 3 October 1682 including;

- The French envoy François Picquet
- The Polish envoy Bogdan Gurdziecki
- The Siamese envoy Hāji Salim Māzandarāni
- An envoy from the Uzbek Bukhara Khanate

Picquet noted that the Siamese gifts brought by Hāji Salim to the Shah were so abundant that listing all of them would be lengthy, requiring up to four hundred bearers to present to the Shah. Siamese gifts from King Narai to the Shah included Chinese porcelains, Japanese screens and Siamese peacocks. Hāji Salim also asked the Shah for Persian naval military support against Pegu (Burma) for Siam. The Shah Suleiman himself gave a very brief response to each of the foreign envoys. It had been customary for envoys to stay in Persia for some years, living under financial sponsorship from the Safavid court. In order to maintain his appearance as an honorable Siamese ambassador in Isfahan, the Siamese envoy Hāji Salim spent as much as 5,000 Iranian tomans and borrowed 1,000 tomans from the Dutch and the English apart from receiving money from the Persians. Hāji Salim had also been commissioned to trade in Persia for King Narai.

Meanwhile, in Ayutthaya, King Narai increasingly favored Constantine Phaulkon. Narai was impressed by European-style fortresses and consulted Phaulkon on his project of refortifying Siamese towns in Western style. The Siamese commoner men, wishing to avoid being mobilized to construct such forts, bribed Kosa Lek the Phrakhlang with fifty catties of money, deploring Kosa Lek to speak against the project. When Kosa Lek pleaded Narai to reconsider in 1683, Narai knew that Kosa Lek had been bribed and considered Kosa Lek to be corrupted. King Narai punished Kosa Lek with rattan canes, inflicting wounds on Kosa Lek, leading to his death in July 1683. Death of Kosa Lek catapulted Constantine Phaulkon to foremost power and influence, being appointed as Okya Wichaiyen (Thai: ออกญาวิไชเยนทร์), technically the Prime Minister of Siam. Later in 1683, Phaulkon secured appointment of his former EIC superiors Richard Burnaby as Okphra Marit the governor of Mergui and Samuel White as the harbormaster of Mergui.

King Charles XI of Sweden had sent Ludvig Fabritius as the Swedish envoy to Persia. Ludvig Fabritius reached Isfahan for the second time in March 1684, accompanied by the German naturalist Engelbert Kaempfer. According to Kaempfer's account, Amoenitatum Exoticarum, the Safavid court held audience of various foreign envoys with the Shah Suleiman on 30 July 1684 at Saʿādat-ābād Garden across the Zayanderud river from Isfahan. Kaempfer mentioned Hāji Salim as Legatus Siamensis, natione Persa or "Siamese ambassador, Persian by birth", who was called immediately after the Swedish envoy. This was the farewell audience of Hāji Salim with the Shah as he was going to return to Siam. Hāji Salim received the robe of honor (Persian: خلعت ḵelʿat) and kissed the feet of the Shah to say goodbye. The Shah also entrusted his letter for the King of Siam to Hāji Salim. Persian ministers tucked the Shah's royal letter onto the head turban of Hāji Salim. After the farewell audience, after staying in Isfahan for about two years, Hāji Salim Māzandarāni the Siamese envoy departed from Isfahan for Bandar Abbas on his return journey to Siam.

== Journey of Persian envoys to Siam ==
=== Conception of the Persian Mission to Siam ===
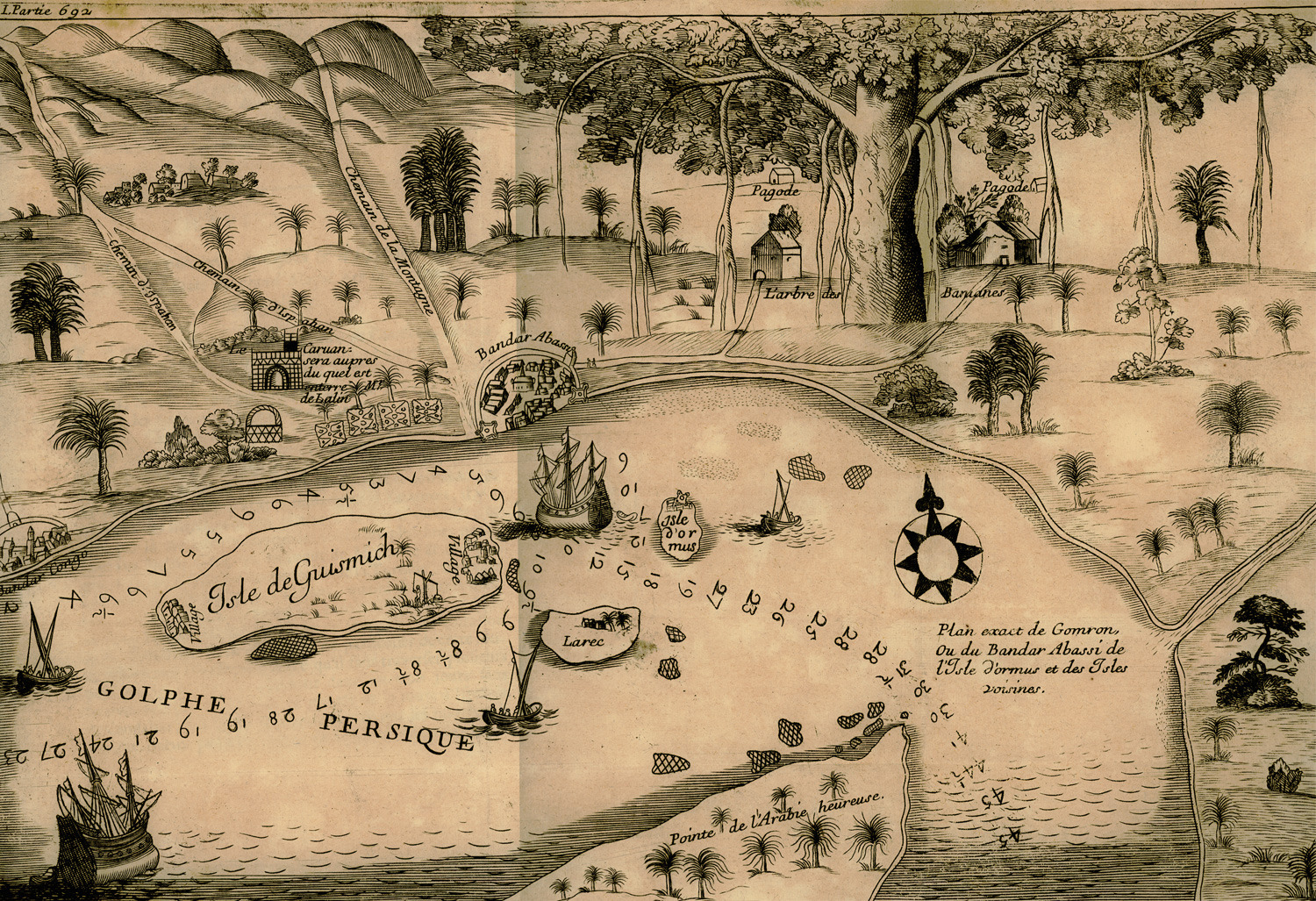
Visualized map of the Persian port of Bandar Abbas, also called Gamron or Gombroon and the Straits of Hormuz from Les Six Voyages de Jean Baptiste Tavernier

In 1681, King Narai of Ayutthaya sent a Persian–Siamese official Hāji Salim Māzandarāni (Persian: حاجی سلیم مازندرانی) as the Siamese royal ambassador on a diplomatic mission to bring Narai's letter to Shah Suleiman I of the Safavid dynasty. Hāji Salim reached the Persian port of Bandar Abbas in January 1682, had the audience with the Shah Suleiman in October 1682, stayed in Isfahan for about two years and then had a farewell audience with the Shah in July 1684, during which the Shah entrusted his own reply letter for the King of Siam to Hāji Salim. After the farewell audience with the Shah, Hāji Salim the Siamese envoy departed from Isfahan for Bandar Abbas on his return journey to Siam. However, Hāji Salim was unable to take off right away due to unfavorable winds and became stranded in Bandar Abbas for a while.

Shah Suleiman I of Persia had been neglecting the state affairs, which had been taken over by the Grand Vizier Shaykh Ali Khan Zanganeh. The Grand Vizier decided, in the name of the Shah, to send a reciprocal diplomatic mission to the Siamese Kingdom of Ayutthaya. Out of numerous incoming diplomatic missions, Safavid Persia, during the reign of Shah Suleiman I, only reciprocated Siam (1685), Russia (1690) and Ottoman Empire (1691) with full-fledged diplomatic missions. The Ship of Sulaimān elaborated the reason of sending diplomatic mission to Siam as;

Our king [Shah Suleiman] has a character of special generosity and general compassion. The world stands dazzled before his practised virtue. His bounty exceeds all proportions of description. His compassion is like the compassion which brought back sight to Jacob, the old man of Canaan. His indulgence is as renowned as the indulgence which Joseph of Egypt practised in this world. And though our king, a constellation in the firmament of power, would be seen to deal with merchandise of lesser stuff, he resolved to condescend; remembering the pious words, 'For if they salute you, salute them back the best of salutations', he saw fit to grace the Siamese king with the glances of his bounty and thereby raise that king above his peers. Therefore, Muḥammad Ḥusayn Beg, officer of the honorable Khāṣṣa, was appointed the head of a delegation made up of Qūrchīs, Ghulāms, Tūpchīs and Tufanchīs, all of whom were to travel to Siam.

As King Narai had requested Persian military support against Burma, the Safavid court assigned militarymen as envoys to Siam. Muḥammad Ḥusayn Beg (Persian: محمدحسین بیگ), a gholām (servant soldier) of the Khāṣṣa (Shah's royal household), ghulām-e sarkār-e khāṣṣa-ye sharīfa (Persian: غلامِ سرکارِ خاصّهٔ شریفه), was appointed as the chief Persian envoy to Siam. This Persian diplomatic retinue consisted of the Qūrchī (Persian: قورچی "royal guards"), the Gholām (Persian: غلام "servant soldiers"), the Tūpchī (Persian: توپچی "artillerymen") and the Tufangchī (Persian: تفنگچی "musketeers"). The Shah also sent a number of gifts for the King of Siam, including thirty-three horses.

Muḥammad Rabīʿ or Muḥammad Rabīʿ ibn Muḥammad Ebrāhīm (Persian: محمد ربیع بن محمد ابراهیم), secretary of the Shah's musketeers (Tufangchī), was assigned to be the scribe of the mission. This Muḥammad Rabīʿ was the author of Safīna-ye Soleymānī (Persian: سفینهٔ سلیمانی) or "The Ship of Suleiman" that serves as the primary source of the historiography of this Persian Mission to Siam. Muḥammad Rabīʿ was a son of Muḥammad Ebrāhīm Naṣīrī (Persian: محمد ابراهیم نصیری) the vizier of Azerbaijan who had just been transferred to financial administration of Astarābād. Muḥammad Ebrāhīm later wrote Dastūr-i Shāhriyārān, a Persian historical chronicles covering early reign of Shah Soltan Hoseyn. They were of Naṣīrī-Ṭūsī-Ordūbādī family that served Safavid administration for two centuries.

Meanwhile, with the shipwreck of the French vessel Soleil d'Orient carrying the Siamese envoy to France Okya Phiphatkosa in late 1681, King Narai of Ayutthaya sent out two Siamese officials in January 1684 to search for the lost envoy. The 1680s was the high period of Siamese international diplomacy. Pêro Vaz de Siqueira from Macau arrived in Siam as the Portuguese envoy in March 1684. French missionary Bénigne Vachet led the two Siamese officials to meet King Charles II of England at Windsor Castle in September 1684 and King Louis XIV of France at the Palace of Versailles in November 1684. Vachet also told King Louis XIV in private that the King of Siam might be converted to Catholicism through a Western man named Constantine Phaulkon, who had been a close confidante of the Siamese king. Louis XIV then dispatched in December 1684 a French diplomatic mission to Siam under Chevalier de Chaumont with a religious goal of converting King Narai and a commercial goal of securing trade privileges for the French East India Company.

This Persian diplomatic mission to Siam, led by the chief envoy Muḥammad Ḥusayn Beg, departed from Isfahan to stay at Bandar Abbas in late 1684, joining the Siamese envoy Hāji Salim already there and waiting for a favorable wind to take off. Meanwhile, the French diplomatic mission to Siam under Chevalier de Chaumont departed from Brest in March 1685, boarding on the French ship Oiseau, reaching the Cape of Good Hope in May 1685. The Persian envoys had to wait for six frustrating months until their departure from Bandar Abbas in June 1685.

=== Journey from Bandar Abbas to Mergui ===
Persian diplomatic mission to Siam, led by Muḥammad Ḥusayn Beg, joined by the Siamese envoy Hāji Salim Māzandarāni on his return journey, struggled to find a ship for the mission as Persia had no diplomatic oceangoing vessel. It was the English East India Company who provided the ship Bengal Merchant, commanded by Captain John Goldsborough, for the Persians to go to Siam. The Persian envoys, led by Ḥusayn Beg, including the Siamese envoy Hāji Salim and the thirty-three horses, departed from Bandar Abbas in the Straits of Hormuz on the 25th of Rajab 1096 AH or 27 June 1685 on the English ship Bengal Merchant, while De Chaumont was also in the Indian Ocean. As the Bengal Merchant entered the Gulf of Oman, the watcher fell asleep and the Bengal Merchant drifted dangerously close to a reef, risking running aground. The Bengal Merchant had to be dragged by two small vessels attached by anchor chains out of the reef. Then the wind died down and the ship remained stagnant, subjecting its crew to an unbearable summer heat. This was probably the first sea voyage of these Persians, who were mostly inland cavalrymen.

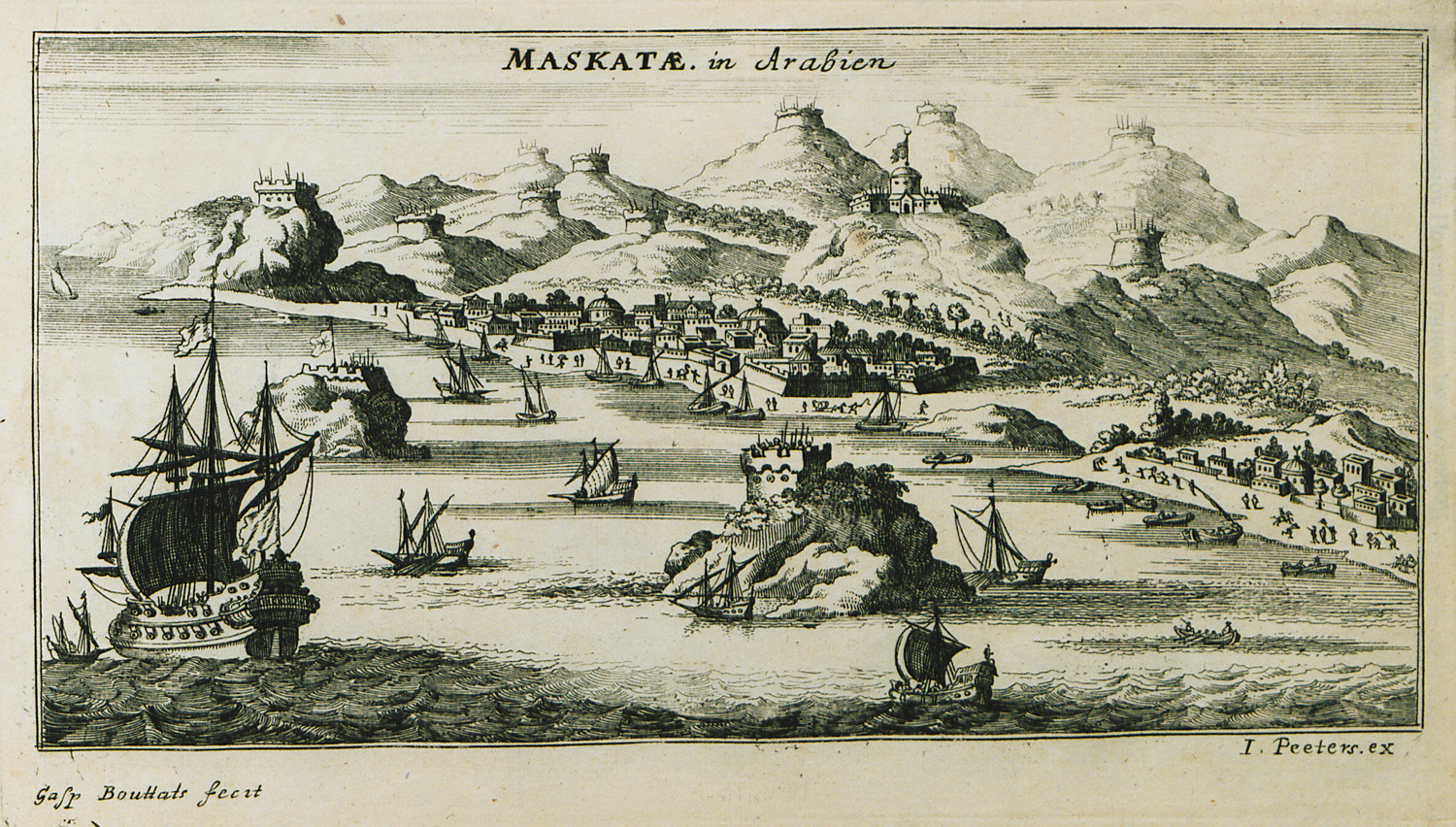
Dutch depiction (1690) of Muscat by Jacob Peeters

On 11 July 1685, fourteen days after their departure from Bandar Abbas, the Persian envoys on the Bengal Merchant arrived at Muscat, the port city of the Imamate of Oman, where the Siamese diplomatic cargo was previously seized in 1669. As an adherent of Twelver Shi'ism, Muḥammad Rabī, in his The Ship of Sulaimān, venerated Ali and had a sectarian opinion on the Ibadi Arabs of Oman, whom Muḥammad Rabī pejoratively called "Khārijites" and "Nāṣib Arabs". "When ʿAlī prince of true believers sought to purify the flower-bed of religion and had cleared the soil of the thorns and brambles of the Khārijites at Nahravān, there were nine of the multitude who eluded his sword." Muḥammad Rabī narrated struggle of the Omanis in conquering Muscat from the Portuguese; "Formerly it was held by the Portuguese Franks but a few years ago these Khārijites took to their slyness and caught the cursed Franks off guard." Muḥammad Rabī also criticized the Omanis for holding their leader to be the true Imam.

Nevertheless, Muḥammad Rabī complemented that Muscat was strongly fortified by Omanis in anticipation of a Portuguese attack. The Persian envoys stayed in Muscat for three days and then departed on July 14. Crossing the Arabian Sea, the Bengal Merchant met a violent storm, during which a Persian man from Māzandāran was thrown off board by the storm into the sea and drowned. Everyone wept and prayed until the storm subsided. The Persian envoys on the Bengal Merchant eventually reached the Fort of St. George at Madras, which was called Chīnāpatan by the Persians, on the Coromandel Coast, on 13 August 1685, forty-seven days after departure from Bandar Abbas; "After forty-seven days at sea we arrive at our next stop, the port Chinapatan. This is one of the ports of the territory of Carnatik in the vicinity of Ḥaidarābād. The English have rented it for twelve thousand hūns and have built themselves a fort there and established a city". Simultaneously, the French mission to Siam under De Chaumont on the Oiseau reached Java in August 1685.

As Madras was not a deep-water port, any large oceangoing ships had to anchor at a great distance offshore, while the passengers had to take small local canoes to approach the shore. Next day, on August 14, the Persian envoys disembarked from the Bengal Merchant onto a small vessel with fifty local Indian rowers. As the Persians envoys approached the Fort of St. George on the small canoe, the English at the Fort fired gun salutes to honor them. William Gyfford the President of the Fort of St. George personally received the Persian envoys, including the chief envoy Ḥusayn Beg and the Siamese envoy Hāji Salim, on the shore and took them on a tour around the Fort. William Gyfford then held a ceremonial reception of the Persian envoys, who sat on ebony chairs prepared by the English. Gyfford stood up, made a toast to Christian God and the gun salutes were fired again. Muḥammad Rabī described Madras as very fertile, filled with many gardens; "The port's inhabitants are of various racial backgrounds but most of them are Telugu Hindus", also complementing that the English maintained high discipline in manning and guarding of the Fort.

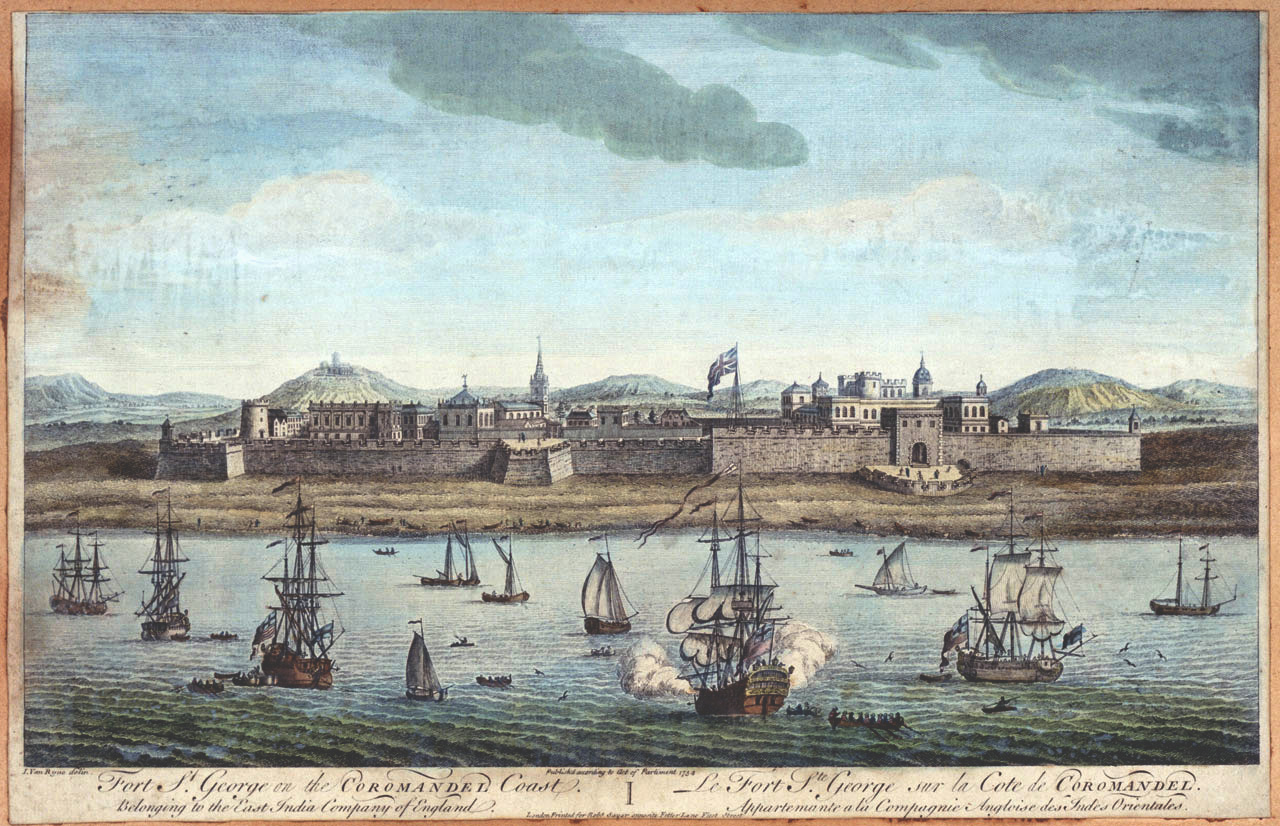
Colored engraving depicting the Fort St. George in Madras or modern Chennai

During the stay of these Persians, the news arrived in Madras that King Charles II had died and the new king James II ascended the English throne. Gyfford invited the Persians to join their celebration party of ascension of the new English king in the Madras garden on the 22nd of Ramaẓān 1096 AH or 23 August 1685 in the evening. During the party, the English toasted the Shah of Iran first, the King of England second, the King of Siam last and then the cannons fired salutes. Muḥammad Rabī also had some opinions on "religion of the Franks", saying that Christians were divided into many sects with different theology but all of them believed that Jesus was the son of God.

The Persians envoys, however, were in financial problems. Hāji Salim reportedly borrowed 200 pagodas, each 100 pagodas for the Persian and the Siamese Mission, respectively, from the English East India Company in Madras, promising to return before his departure. Hāji Salim even borrowed more 400 and 150 pagodas. Service of the English ship Bengal Merchant transporting the Persian envoys to Madras was not free and the Persians had not yet paid the freight. In Madras, the Persians envoys had a Brahmin fortune-teller read their fortunes for fun. The Indian fortune-teller prophesized that the Persian chief envoy, Ḥusayn Beg, would die upon arrival at a place that had water and vegetation on all four sides, the King of Siam would be angry and would imprison one of the envoys.

On 26 August 1685, the French Mission under De Chaumont on the Oiseau departed from Dutch Batavia for Siam, going into the Gulf of Siam. After staying in the Fort St. George for about one month, the Persian envoys, including Ḥusayn Beg, Hāji Salim and Muḥammad Rabī, left the Fort and embarked on another EIC ship Annapourna on the 17th of Shawwāl 1096 AH or 16 September 1685, with Hāji Salim having not yet paying the debts he owed the EIC in Madras. On September 19, the Persian Mission on the Annapourna also departed from Madras for Siam, transversing the Bay of Bengal to Mergui on the Siamese Tenasserim Coast. This was the usual trans-Bay-of-Bengal route of English and Muslim merchant vessels trading between Tenasserim and the Coromandel Coast. As the Annapourna approached the Andaman Islands, the winds blew the ship off course towards Lower Burma, blowing the Annapourna to nearly hit a rocky island. Again, small vessels had to drag the large ship "like a stubborn she camel" to the right course. The Tenasserim Coast is very rocky in nature. To reach Mergui, the Annapourna had to tread carefully among the treacherous rocks and reefs of the Mergui archipelago in an hazardous journey. Only local sailors knew the safe path.

== Journey from Mergui to Lopburi ==
=== Arrival of Persian envoys in Tenasserim ===
The French diplomatic mission to Siam under Chevalier de Chaumont on the Oiseau arrived at the Chaophraya river bar from the Gulf of Siam on 23 September 1685. The French ship Oiseau was unable to pass the river bar so De Chaumont got stuck as Constantine Phaulkon and the Siamese court prepared a grand reception of the French royal ambassador. In the same time as the French Mission was arriving on the Gulf of Siam side, the Persian envoys on the English ship Annapourna were also approaching the Siamese seaport of Mergui on the Andaman Sea side. The Siamese envoy Hāji Salim explained to the Persian envoy Muḥammad Ḥusayn Beg that, in Siamese diplomatic protocol, the Shah's royal letter would be revered as if it was the Persian king in person.

The Persian envoys arrived in Mergui around late September or early October 1685. Unable to approach further due to the dangerous rocks, the Annapourna fired cannons to announce its arrival. Mergui natives came out to guide the ship Annapourna into Mergui. Upon arrival, Siamese officials in Mergui brought a jeweled receptacle on a golden throne shaded with gold brocade to receive the Shah's letter on board Annapourna. As the Siamese considered the letters from foreign monarchs as sacred, they threw themselves on the floor to prostrate to pay respect to the Shah's letter. The governor of Mergui, presumably Okphra Marit Richard Burnaby, came on board the ship Annapourna to receive the Shah's letter and the Persian envoys. Muḥammad Rabī described Siamese veneration of the Shah's letter as if they were worshipping God;

They raised their hands and joined both palms with their fingers carefully spread apart. First they touch the ground with the tips of their two little fingers and raise them up again. Then they touch the tips of their two thumbs to their head and prostrate themselves once more. They repeat the whole procedure three times in exactly the same way. In fact this is the very manner in which they worship before their idols as well as how they honor their king.

The Shah's letter, the center of Siamese reception ceremony, on the golden throne, was then placed on a royal barge with red cloth decorations and transported ashore at Mergui. The Persian envoys, who served as the mere carriers of the Shah's letter, in Siamese eyes, were placed on another barge to follow to sacred letter. On the shore, the Shah's letter was placed on another larger throne that required four men to lift and four men to guard at four sides at all times. On this dazzling throne, the Shah's letter was carried to be placed at a temple. Okya Tanao the governor of the whole forest region of Tenasserim, called Tanāsurī by the Persians, was a Persian man serving under the Siamese government and his son Muḥammad Ṣādiq was assigned to take care of the Persian envoys.

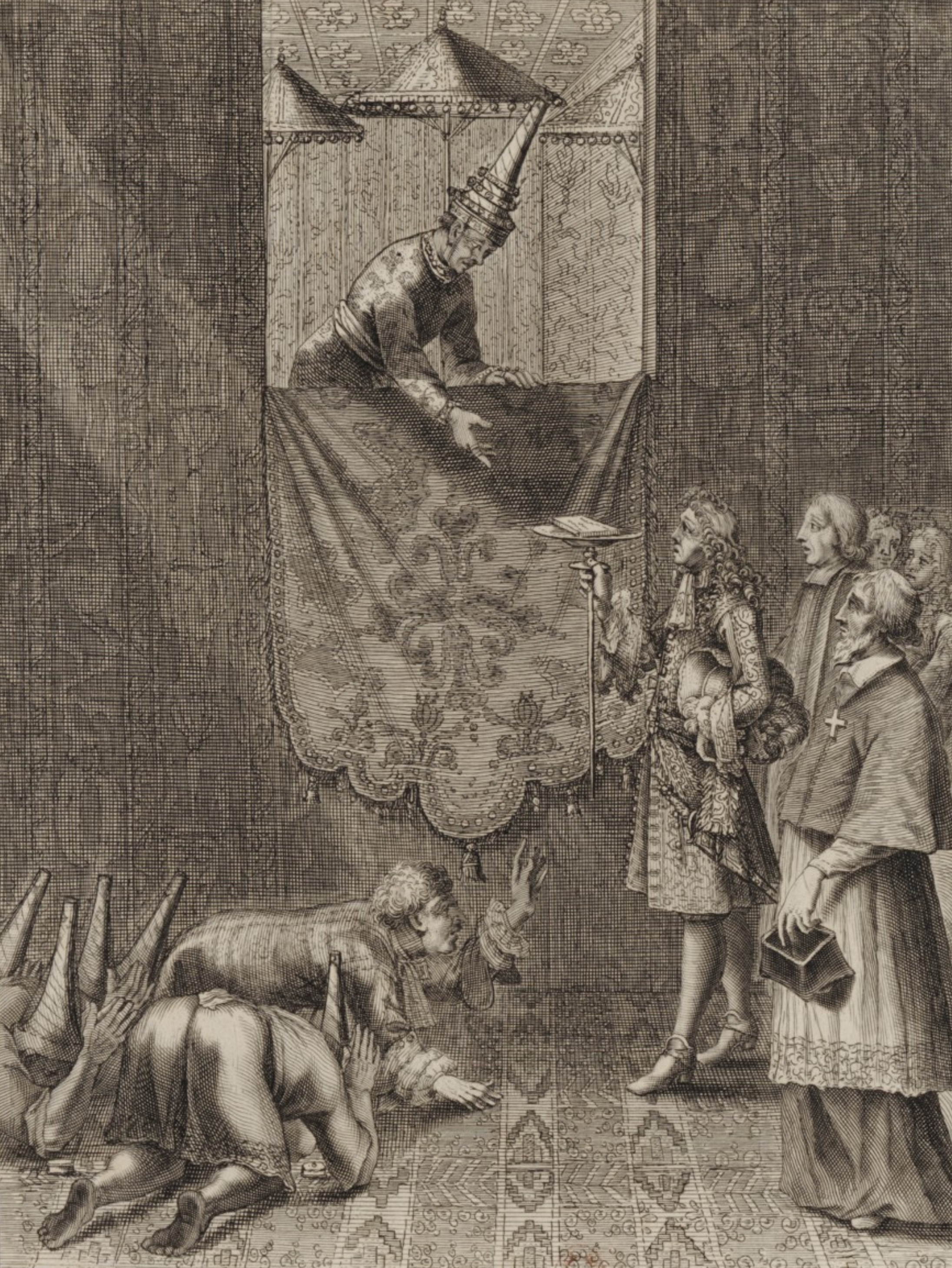
Depiction of Chevalier de Chaumont delivering Louis XIV's letter to King Narai at Ayutthaya Royal Palace, with Constantine Phaulkon prostrating, on 18 October 1685, while the Persian envoys were in Mergui.

After waiting at the river bar on the Oiseau for two weeks, the French envoy Chevalier de Chaumont embarked on Siamese river barges on 8 October 1685 to ascend to Bangkok or Thonburi, where De Chaumont was received by governor of Bangkok the Turkish man Okphra Thonburi Çelebi. De Chaumont was received in full honors with sixty-six Siamese riparian barges escorting him in a grand procession. When De Chaumont reached Ayutthaya on October 13, his procession consisted of 150 barges. De Chaumont found Siamese court etiquette, including prostration, unacceptable. De Chaumont also refused to surrender the French royal letter, insisting that he would personally deliver the latter to King Narai's hand per Western protocol. King Narai then compromised with European customs. In his audience with King Narai, on 18 October 1685, at Sanphet Prasat Throne Hall in Ayutthaya Royal Palace, De Chaumont stood instead of prostrating and delivered Louis XIV's letter to the hand of King Narai, during which the Persian envoys were still in Mergui.

As the Siamese royal court was busy receiving the French Mission, the Persian Mission was stranded in Mergui. The Persian envoys, however, were generally dissatisfied with Siamese reception, with Muḥammad Rabī writing; "Although we had so far escaped the dangers of the sea, suddenly we were drowned in an ocean of legally unclean filth". The Persians would not eat meat and rice prepared for them, requesting bread and wanting to find food on their own but Hāji Salim explained that there was no bread in Siam. After some time in Mergui, the Persian envoys, accompanied by Muḥammad Ṣādiq the son of Tenasserim governor, set off inland to the town of Tenasserim (Tanintharyi in modern Myanmar) to continue their journey to Ayutthaya. As the region was mountainous and covered with dense forests, land journey was not possible and sailing through the rivers was the only mode of transportation. The Persians traveled into Great Tenasserim River to arrive in Tenasserim town, which Muḥammad Rabī called Tanāsurī, having the population of around 5,000 to 6,000 households, inhabited by the Siamese and the Muslim Indians.

The Persian–Siamese governor of Tenasserim Okya Tanao and the Siamese envoy to Persia Hāji Salim were in charge of entertaining the Persians. Okya Tanao gave the money of 600 écus to the Persians and put fifty Siamese servants at their disposal. An incident happened when Hāji Salim let out a slip of tongue that he had not been well-entertained in Isfahan, enraging Ḥusayn Beg the chief Persian envoy, who then led the Persians to find food in the Tenasserim market. In efforts to satisfy the Persians, Okya Tanao ordered all sellers in the market to give food to the Persians for free. However, the woman sellers, refusing to comply, deserted the market. The news of arrival of the Persian envoys in Tenasserim was confirmed in Ayutthaya on November 14. The French were soon informed about the simultaneous arrival of the Persians. Constantine Phaulkon, to encourage King Narai to convert to Christianity, told Narai that the Persians also brought the Quran to convert the king to Islam. However, there is no mention in The Ship of Sulaimān about a mission to convert King Narai, although Muḥammad Rabī expressed his wish; "May Allah bless him and guide him into the fold of Islam".

Abbé de Choisy, the second French envoy to Siam, expressed his desire to meet the Persian envoys to drink Shiraz wine with them because De Choisy had read that the Persians were similar to the French in external appearance. However, Phaulkon made sure that the French and the Persians would not meet to avoid possible conflicts. King Narai became angry upon learning about Persian dissatisfactions at Mergui and considered sending the Persians away without ever receiving them. Narai moved from Ayutthaya to stay at his detached palace in Lopburi in November 1685, not waiting for the Persians. At Lopburi, Narai said that the Persian envoys came only to present valuable clothes but the French had come with real business. De Choisy also saw a Persian Ta'ziyeh play for the Mourning of Muḥarram on the Āshūrā Day of December 6th in Lopburi;

The Moors finished their Ramadan last night. There had never been such shouting. The procession was quite magnificent: there were several gilded reliquaries, with many torches, dancers, and musicians. They stopped from time to time and cried out, " He is dead, he is dead!" referring to Ali (Husayn ibn Ali), whose sect they follow. The wealthier Moors had made shrines in front of their houses and burned incense there. They carried long poles with silver hands at the ends, which they touched to the reliquaries. I felt great pity for the poor people, for they went about it with all their hearts.

According to Muḥammad Rabī, the Persian envoys had been ill since their time in Bandar Abbas due to unfamiliar climate. Muḥammad Ḥusayn Beg the chief Persian envoy to Siam had been unwell since the storm in the Gulf of Oman and suffered dropsy during his time in Madras. Members of this retinue had died along their journey from Bandar Abbas to Siam. Ḥusayn Beg arrived in Siam in sickly state and King Narai had sent two doctors, one Chinese and one Siamese, to tend to him. Ḥusayn Beg unexpectedly died from illness in Tenasserim on the 12th of Muḥarramu l-Ḥarām 1097 AH (8 December 1685).

=== Journey from Tenasserim to Lopburi ===
To reciprocate the French Mission, King Narai of Siam appointed Kosa Pan, younger brother of the deceased Kosa Lek, as the Ratchathut or Chief Envoy on a diplomatic mission to France. De Chaumont had a farewell audience with King Narai on December 12 at Lopburi and went down to the Chaophraya river bar. De Chaumont and the French envoys, along with Kosa Pan and the Siamese envoys, embarked on the French ship Oiseau at the river bar and departed on 22 December 1685 for France. Only after the departure of the French from Lopburi that the Persians in Tenasserim were allowed to proceed on their journey to meet the King of Siam.

Untimely death of Muḥammad Ḥusayn Beg the chief Persian envoy to Siam from illness at Tenasserim in December 1685 delivered a great blow and shock to the Persian Mission. After his death, those who were left surviving were the two Qūrchīs (royal guards), two Gholāms (servant soldiers), one Tūpchī (cannoneer) and one Tufangchī (musketeer), plus Muḥammad Rabī himself. A few days after, a delegate of King Narai arrived in Tenasserim to lead the remaining Persian envoys to Ayutthaya. According to Muḥammad Rabī, the Siamese deliberately led the Persians on detour to showcase economic prosperity and military defenses of the kingdom, taking longer time that it normally took. The Persian envoys were led sailing on boats along the Little Tenasserim River, taking about twenty days to reach the town of Jalinga (modern Naunghwa in Myanmar near Myanmar–Thailand Border), called Jalang by Muḥammad Rabī.

At Jalinga, the Persian envoys rode on female elephants prepared by King Narai to go on their journey. These elephants bore a seat-like apparatus on their backs for the envoys to ride. The Shah's letter was placed on the most elaborate throne on the most magnificent elephant. The trodding elephants carried the Persian envoys to go through the Singkhon Pass, Kuiburi, Pranburi on the Gulf of Siam coast and, after fifteen days, reached Phetchaburi, called Paj Purī in The Ship of Sulaimān. The governor of Phetchaburi was a Persian man under Siamese service named Sayyid Māzandarāni, who received the envoys graciously.

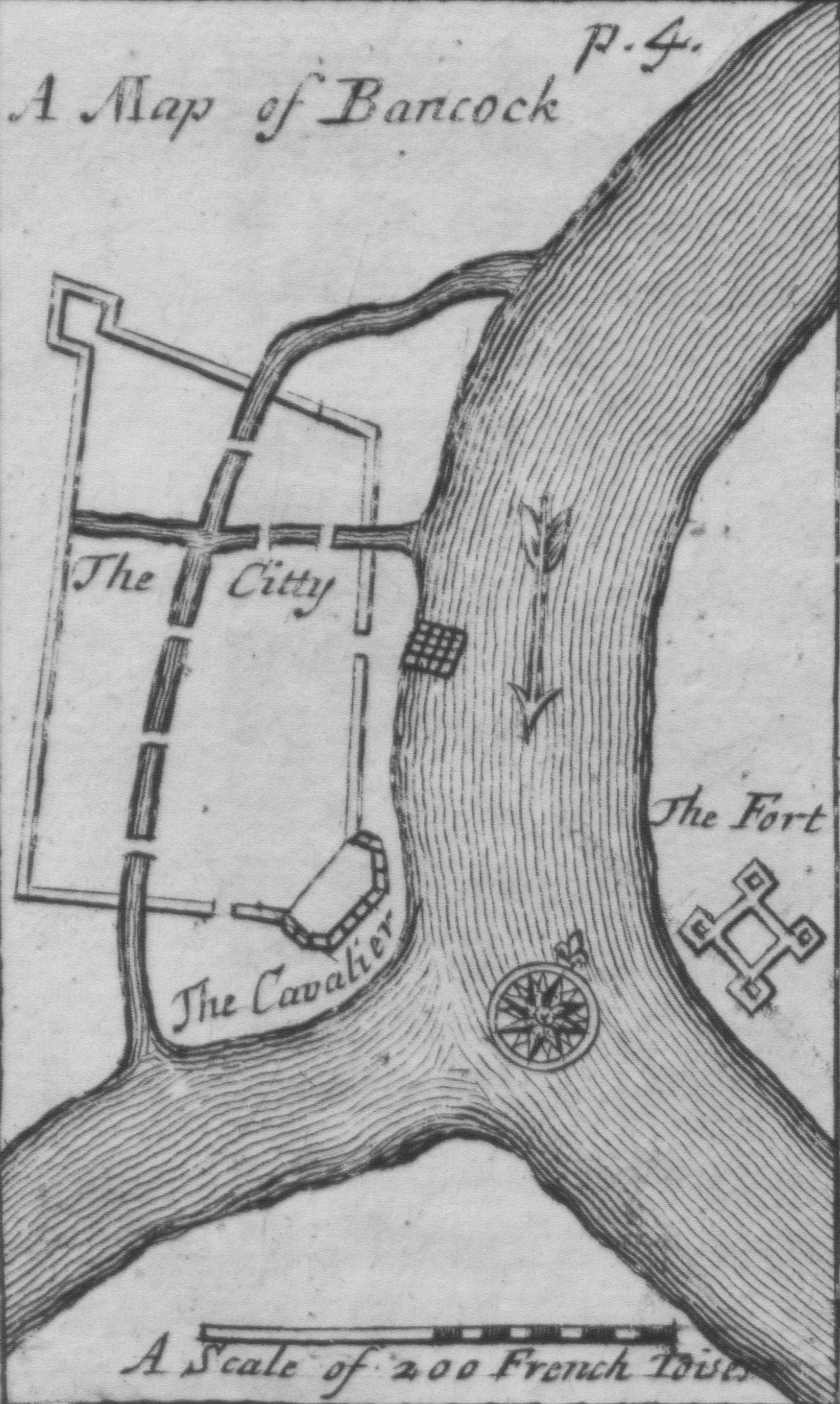
Plan of Bangkok from La Loubère's Du royaume de Siam; most of the town was on Thonburi western river bank, while a fort was on the eastern bank.

After Phetchaburi, the Persian envoys embarked on boats to reach the outskirt vicinity Bangkok or Thonburi, called Sūhān in The Ship of Sulaimān (perhaps conflating with Suphanburi), in around late January 1686. By that time, Bangkok was a fortified town, downstream from Ayutthaya on the Chaophraya River, serving as the tollbooth outpost receiving all incoming foreign ships. Muḥammad Rabī was impressed by the lush grenery filled with fruit orchards, observing that trees in Siam did not change colors in autumn;

Again we boarded boats and in one more day we came to the town of Sūhān. This community is attached to Shahr Nāv and is extremely fertile and beautiful. A wondrous river of fresh water flows through the town and continues down to the sea. On both sides of the river for several farsakhs are orchards which are not partitioned by walls or fences There grows every soft of fruit trees, lemon, orange, coconut and mango, as well as the betel tree, which for beauty and grace rivals the free, swaying cypress. In fact, every fruit native to Siam was available in that village.

All around us were the trees that never feel the withering touch of autumn, trees as flourishing as the youthful hopes which old men nourish in their hearts. Most countries of Below the Winds (Persian: زیر بادات Zīrbādāt) evade the grip of autumn. The meadows and the trees keep their skirts free from the chill touch of winter. But this garden spot is surely most blessed of all the regions.

Okphra Thonburi or the Governor of Bangkok was a Turkish man named Çelebi, or Chelebī in Persian, who had earlier converted to Shia Islam; "He was from among the people of Rūm, had settled in this country and enjoyed the honor of lately converting to Shī'ism. Chelebī was presently the rajah of that region." Okphra Thonburi Chelebī came out with a riparian boat procession to receive the Persian envoys and the Shah's letter at the mouth of Chaophraya River. Chelebī had prepared a Siamese-style gilded ceremonial barge with a gilded throne and fifty rowers to carry the Shah's letter with utmost reverence. Seven other barges with canopied cabins decorated with curtains, rugs and cushions, were for the Persian envoys. Each of the remaining seven Persian delegates were assigned each of these seven barges.

However, around the same time, King Narai appointed the French military officer Claude de Forbin as Okphra Sakdi Songkhram the new governor of Bangkok, replacing Chelebī, who was transferred to become the governor of Phetchaburi instead. The Persians envoys took these barges to arrive in the Bangkok Fort, where the Siamese fire gun salutes and the Persians were accommodated. A head Persian guard, called by Muḥammad Rabī as Yūzbāshī (Persian: یوزباشی from Turkish Yüzbaşı "leader of one hundred") of the Right Wing, greeted the Persian envoys and led them into Bangkok Fort. There were around 200 Persian guards under King Narai, being divided into the Left Wing and the Right Wing, each wing commanded by a Yūzbāshī.

The Persian envoys received royal message from King Narai that the Siamese king expressed his deepest sympathy for the hardships they had endured through their journey and condolences for the death of the chief Persian envoy Ḥusayn Beg at Tenasserim. The Yūzbāshī also suggested that the Persians should select one of their own to act as the chief envoy to replace the deceased Ḥusayn Beg. Muḥammad Rabī, as the secretary of the mission, then wrote a letter to King Narai in response;

May it be known to the elevated corps of the king’s attendants that ever since your honorable administration first conceived the pure sentiment of opening the doors of friendship before our king who is guarded by the angels, whose chosen family is like into ʿAlī’s and whose threshold is as the Heavens, your kingdom has remained a fixed object beneath our ruler’s sun-like gaze. Indeed he is the very qibla of the world, the Kaʿba of mankind.

Thus when Ḥājī Salīm was sent to the threshold of our holy country, as surety of our king’s friendship, he was received with limitless affection and honored with our highest forms of respect and generosity. In compliance with Ḥājī Salīm’s petition, the late Muḥammad Ḥusayn Beg and his group of servants from the honorable Khāṣṣa administration were appointed to undertake this journey.

Also in this letter, Muḥammad Rabī deplored King Narai to select one of the remaining Persian envoys as the new chief envoy, as they were unable to choose among themselves. The Persian envoys traveled on riparian barges from Bangkok upstream the Chaophraya towards Ayutthaya. All incoming foreign missions were required to stop at the Khanon Luang or Southern toll post near Wat Protsat Temple (in modern Bang Pa-in District, about five kilometers to the south of historical Ayutthaya city); the place that was called Tabanque by the French. The Persian envoys were halted and Siamese officials from Ayutthaya came down to greet and receive them at this Southern outpost. The Persians were accommodated with a finer house with more elaborate decorations and furnitures.

The Persian delegates were informed that the King of Siam was then not in Ayutthaya but rather in Lopburi or Lavo, called Lubū by the Persians, which was about 50 kilometers to the north of Ayutthaya. King Narai ordered the Persian diplomatic mission to be presented to him in Lopburi. The Persians were then to ascend, passing through Ayutthaya to Lopburi. After one-night stay at Khanon Luang, the Siamese led the Persians delegates to pass through Ayutthaya, ascending upstream the Lopburi River to reach Lopburi.

Khwāja Ḥasan ʿAlī (Persian: خواجه حسن علی) the incumbent leader of Persian community in Siam, who held the title and position of Okphra Si Naowarat, the same position as the late Āqā Muḥammad Astarābādī, came out from Lopburi to greet the Persian envoys. Khwāja Ḥasan ʿAlī claimed to be a descendant of Khwāja ʿAbd al-Laṭīf the Vizier of Khurāsān in the Ilkhanid period. Ḥasan ʿAlī transferred the Shah's letter onto a Siamese golden throne to be carried to Lopburi.

=== Arrival of Persian envoys in Lopburi ===
By this time, King Narai had been spending eight to nine months per year in Lopburi rather than in Ayutthaya. The Persians were briefed by the Siamese about the history of Lopburi and the reason why King Narai had been spending most of his time in the city;

Lubū is a spacious city with pleasant climate and in former times had been the capital and prospered greatly. The city itself is surrounded by seven fortification walls, one within the other. A diagonal through the city's center would measure about a farsakh. To one side of the town flows a huge river.

As time passed, however, the city's ramparts fell into ruin. Recently the present king rebuilt the city, being very pleased with its climate, and now he resides in this comfortable spot and has made it the base of his power. He regularly spends nine months of the year in Lubū.

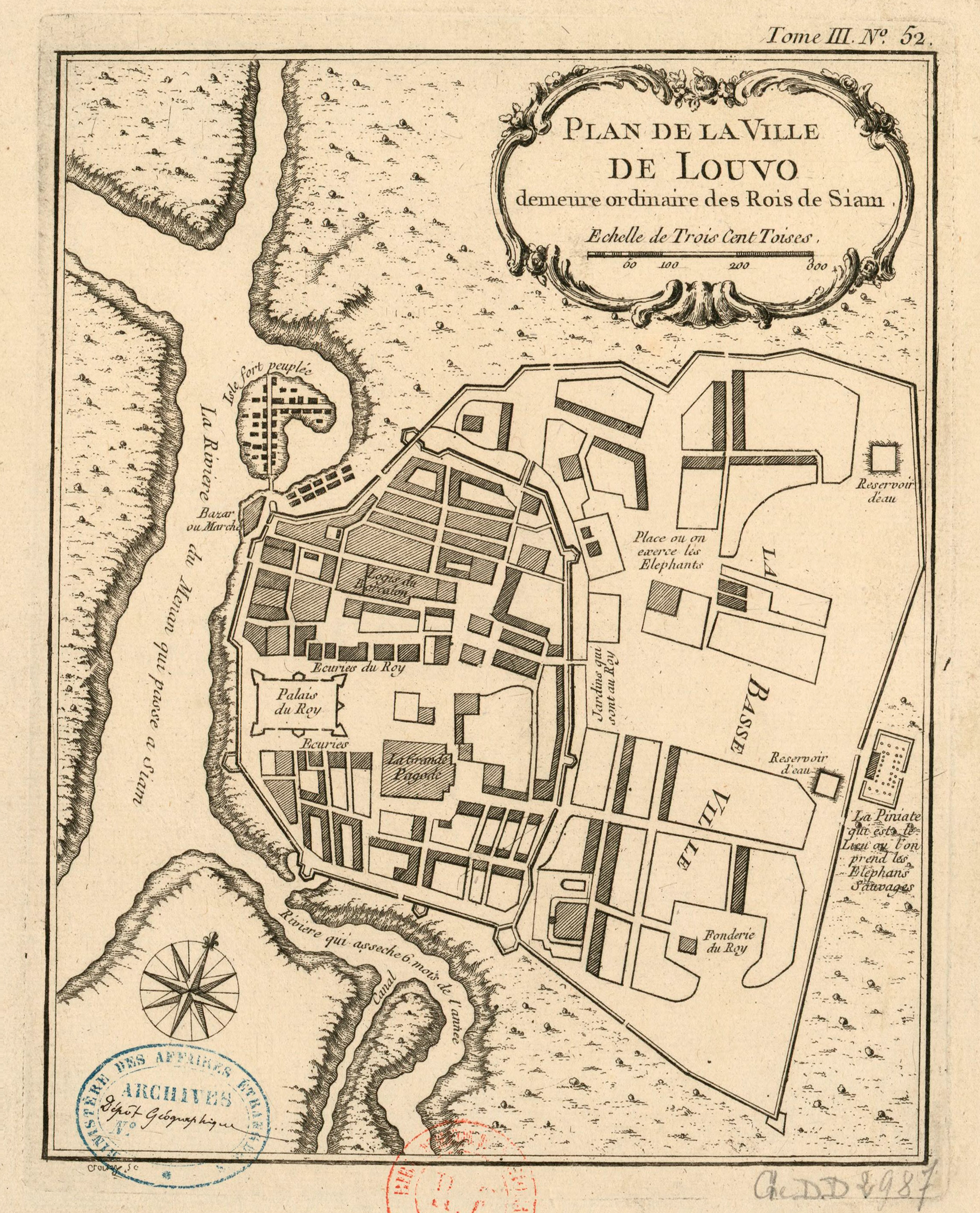
Plan of Western-style fortress of Louvo or Lopburi, 1687, by the French architect De la Mare

The Persian envoys arrived in Siam during the decline of influences of the Persians on King Narai and at the zenith of the power of the Greek man Constantine Phaulkon, whom Muḥammad Rabī pejoratively called Ḥarāmzāda az mardom-e naṣārā (Persian: حرام‌زاده از مردم نصاری "Christian-born Bastard"). Constantine Phaulkon, de facto Prime Minister of Siam, titled Okya Wichaiyen, sought to sideline and minimize the impact of this Persian diplomatic mission on King Narai. According to Muḥammad Rabī, King Narai initially planned to go out to greet the Persian envoys at the outskirts of Lopburi but Phaulkon dissuaded Narai from doing so, citing security reasons.

The Persian envoys reached Lopburi around early February 1686 at the Lopburi's riparian pier to the west of the city on the Lopburi River. Siamese officials moved the Shah's royal letter from the carried throne to the gold-painted royal palanquin. The Shah's gifts were also carried on royal litters. Passage of the Shah's letter was the center of the ceremonies. Upon reaching the Lopburi city wall, the Shah's letter was transferred to an even-more elaborate golden throne, which Muḥammad Rabī described as the one that had been used to carry Buddha images. The Shah's letter was then transferred to be placed on the Siamese king's throne on the royal gilded cart. Elephants with decorations stood along the route of the Shah's letter, as if the Shah himself was taking the passage.

When the Shah's letter and the Persian envoys reached the Lopburi Palace, the Shah's letter and the Shah's gifts were placed in a special pavilion built in Persian architectural style; "The royal estates contain a large garden and a charming pavilion which one of the Iranians built on the grounds when news of our arrival reached the king. The Iranian architect considered his work to be a marvel equal to the dome of Kasrā and the fabled palace of Khavarnaq." The Siamese ministers and the escorted the Persian envoys to reside in two Persian-style buildings specifically constructed to accommodate them, well-furnished with rugs, cushions and even a hammām. In the evening, they were invited to the house of the Iranian minister Ḥasan ʿAlī, joined by the two Yūzbāshīs.

Muḥammad Rabī had earlier asked King Narai to choose a new chief Persian envoy to present the Shah's letter to him. Two days after arrival of the Persian envoys in Lopburi Palace, however, King Narai urged the Persian envoys to select their new leader among themselves. Muḥammad Rabī expected himself to be selected but rather Ebrāhīm Beg (Persian: ابراهیم بیگ) a gholām or servant soldier of the Khāṣṣa, who had been in charge of the Shah's gifts, was chosen as the new chief Persian envoy to Siam.

Traditionally, all foreign envoys coming to Siam had to conform to Siamese court etiquette in having audiences with the Siamese king including prostration, crawling, and kowtowing before the King of Siam. Even the Dutch envoys from VOC prostrated and crawled. Letters from foreign rulers, the most sacred component of a diplomatic mission, would be handed over to responsible Siamese officials, who would translate and read the content of the letter to the king. King Narai had exempted the Portuguese envoy Pêro Vaz de Siqueira and the French envoy Chevalier de Chaumont from prostration, allowing them to stand upright in their audiences with Narai in March 1684 and October 1685, respectively, only after disputes over diplomatic protocol. Only the French envoy De Chaumont was allowed to deliver Louis XIV's letter directly to Narai's hand.

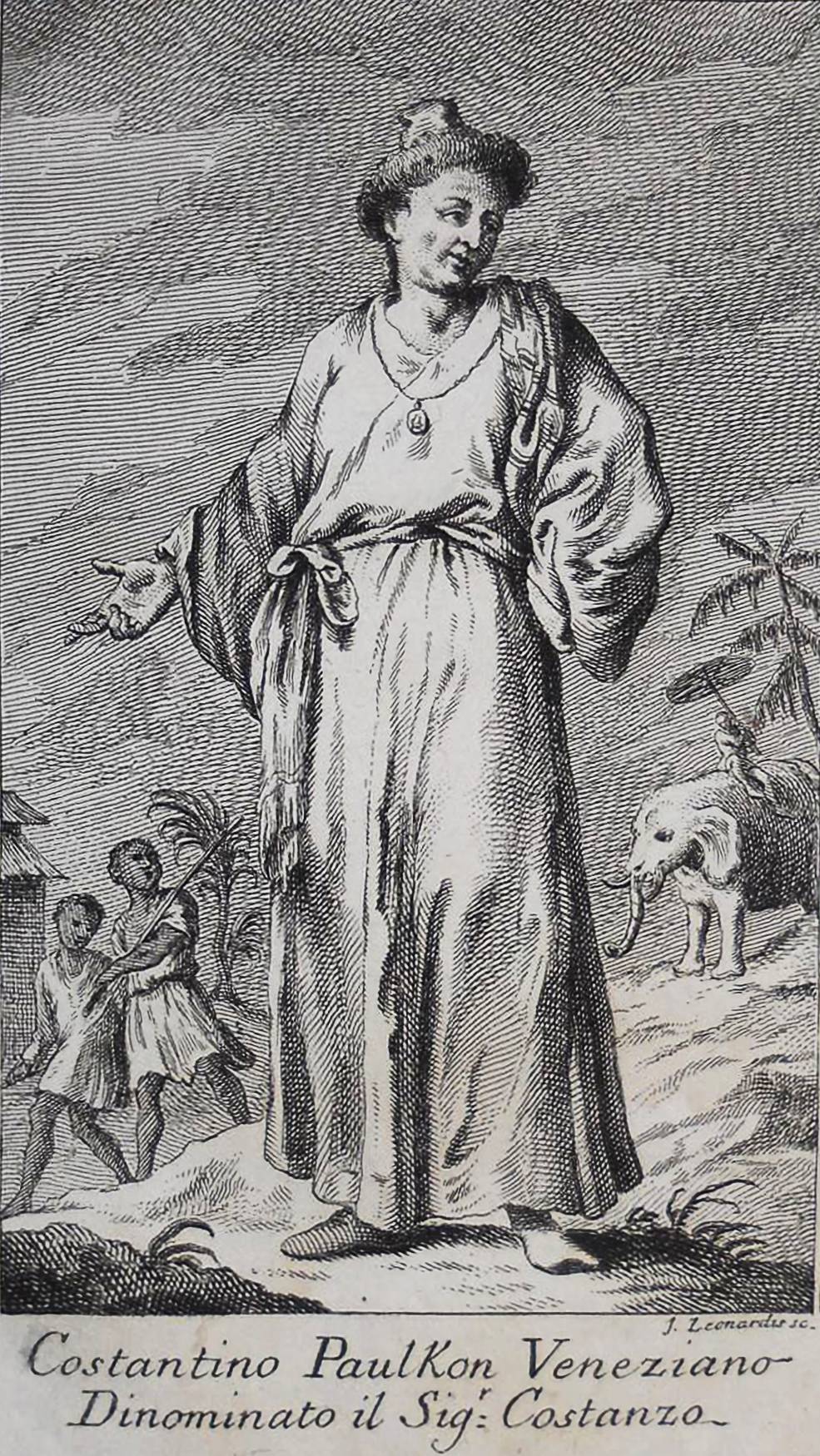
Constantine Phaulkon, a Greek adventurer and former East India Company employee, de facto Prime Minister of Siam, was called Ḥarāmzāda ("Bastard") in The Ship of Sulaimān.

Three days after arrival in Lopburi, Okya Wichaiyen Constantine Phaulkon summoned the Persian envoys to his residence to instruct them on the Siamese court etiquette. Phaulkon asked the Persians at what date they intended to present the Shah's letter to Narai, to which the Persians replied that it would be according to Narai's wishes. Phaulkon then brought up the sensitive issue about the manner that the chief Persian envoy, Ebrāhīm Beg, would deliver the Shah's letter to Narai. The Persians replied that Ebrāhīm Beg should deliver the Shah's letter directly to Narai's hand from his own hand; "We thought the letter should be presented in the ancient way, that the king take the letter from Ibrāhīm Beg's hand, fullfill the requirements of goodwill and sincerity and perform the ceremonies of respect". This answer upset Phaulkon, who had just undergone similar debate with the French envoy De Chaumont over court protocol four months earlier.

By the 1680s, in the eyes of the Siamese court, Persia had a much-reduced image as a powerful influential nation, in comparison to France. Even the French envoy De Chaumont had been allowed only to deliver Louis XIV's letter through a receptacle, not directly, onto Narai's hand. Moreover, King Narai might be irritated by negative attitudes of the Persian envoys towards Siamese reception and customs. Insistence of the Persians to deliver the letter directly to King Narai's hand caused Narai and Phaulkon to intentionally postpone the royal audience as Narai went out to catch elephants without caring about the Persian envoys residing in Lopburi. Narai also imposed pressure and isolation on the Persian envoys by forbidding any Persians in Siam to visit these envoys from their own nation.

Hāji Salim Māzandarāni the Siamese envoy to Persia, who had accompanied the Persian envoys from Bandar Abbas to Siam, was charged with corruption upon his return. Phaulkon received report that Hāji Salim had repeatedly borrowed money from Dutch and English merchants, spending 5,000 Iranian toman and obtaining himself the debt of 2,000 Iranian toman in total, without achieving any considerable trade profits for King Narai. Some of royal provisions intended for the diplomatic mission to Persia was found in Hāji Salim's house. King Narai was angry, saying that he did not care about how much money the Siamese envoys would spend, as long as they increased his name. Hāji Salim's behavior damaged reputation of King Narai. Hāji Salim was then arrested and imprisoned. Even Muḥammad Rabī agreed that Hāji Salim was short-sighted and negligent.

Twenty days after the first talk with Phaulkon, around late February 1686, Muḥammad Rabī the author of The Ship of Sulaimān was summoned to Phaulkon's residence, where Phaulkon asked Muḥammad Rabī about the genuine purpose of this Persian diplomatic mission to Siam. Muḥammad Rabī answered that the Persian envoys had come to promote Persia's amicable relations with Siam; "Our king, the benefactor of mankind, has sent us to this country for the purpose of increasing goodwill and strengthening the foundations of accord and love and there are absolutely no other motives attached to our mission". Then, Phaulkon replied that, if the Persians had come with sincere intentions, they should follow the Siamese protocol;

If what you say is true you should put aside the idea of Ibrāhīm Beg handling your document directly to the king and, as is the practice of Iran, you should stand at a respectful distance from the king and let the honorable chief minister make the actual presentation.

Realizing the compromised standing of the Persians in Siam, Ebrāhīm Beg and other Persian delegates had no choices but to accept Siamese demand; "If you make friends with elephant drivers build your house big enough to admit the elephants". By this arrangement, the Siamese court treated the Persian Mission with the same level of honor as the Portuguese envoy De Siqueira but with lower honor than the French envoy De Chaumont. At least the Persian envoys were exempted from prostration and crawling.

== Stay of Persian envoys in Siam ==
=== Audience of Persian envoys with King Narai in Lopburi ===
As Ebrāhīm Beg the chief Persian envoy informed the Siamese that the Persian envoys were willing to comply to Siamese court customs, the audience of the Persians with King Narai quickly proceeded, taking place around late February 1686. Horses were sent to escort the Persian envoys from their residence to King Narai's palace. Elephants with colorful decorations stood along the route of their journey. Inside of the palace, Siamese soldiers stood in military columns to receive the Persian envoys. Muḥammad Rabī was perplexed by paucity of clothes and armors of Siamese soldiers, describing them as wearing only a piece of red muslin tunic and a hat made of reed, having no uniform nor horses, thinking of this costume as if coming from the primordial age of Idrīs. Muḥammad Rabī also correctly observed that these Siamese soldiers were, in fact, peasantry assembled at special times

The Persian envoys rode horses to proceed to the pavilion where the Shah's letter had been kept. Ebrāhīm Beg transferred the Shah's letter from the throne onto a golden container vessel prepared by the Siamese. Ebrāhīm Beg, holding the Shah's letter on the golden tray, led other Persian envoys to Dusit Sawan Thanya Maha Prasat Throne Hall, where the royal audience took place. As the Persians approached Siamese royal throne hall, upon seeing the throne, the Siamese officials following them threw themselves to prostrate on the ground. The Persian envoys were allowed to walk to enter the throne hall but the Siamese crawled on all fours, on their elbows and knees, to enter; "The authorities were considerate enough to excuse us from this form of homage and we paid our respects in normal manner. But our Siamese escort were all engaged in performing the uluk and they proceeded the rest of the way on their knees and elbows although the building was still sixty paces off."

Ebrāhīm Beg holding the Shah's letter on the gilded receptacle and other Persian delegates walked into the throne hall to see all the Siamese nobles and officials prostrating on the floor, on mats and carpets, according to their rank and dignity, in absolute silence and stillness. Muḥammad Rabī compared this motionless Siamese prostration to Muslims performing prayers;

This huge mass of people, face down on the mats and rugs, looked like a large congregation of Muslims saying their prayers. They were arranged row after row like a collection of dead bodies and not a single person made a move or showed the least sign of life.

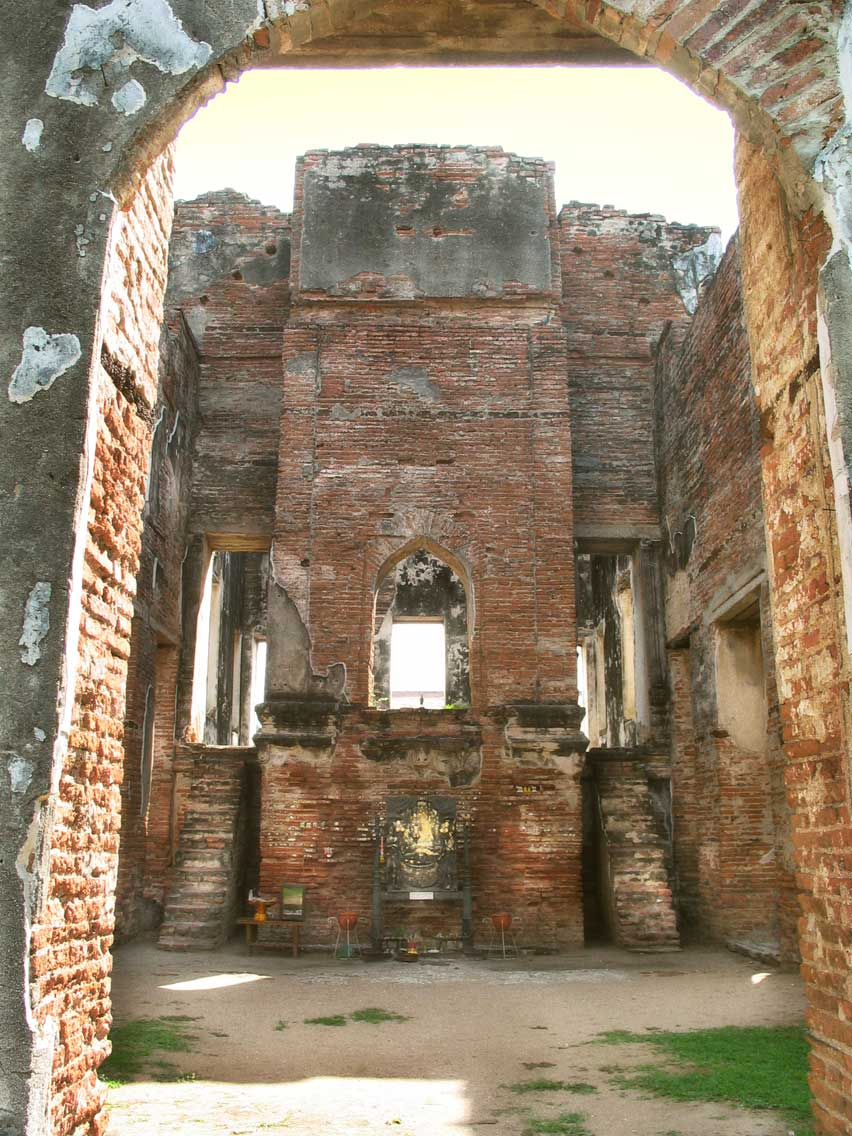
The Sihabanchon balcony that King Narai received the Persian envoys and the letter from Shah Suleiman I around February 1686 at Dusit Sawan Thanya Maha Prasat Throne Hall in Lopburi Palace.

King Narai was on the Sihabanchon or gilded balcony throne in the throne hall. A sofa was placed in front of the throne for the Persian envoys to sit. Ebrāhīm Beg and other Persians stood in front of King Narai between the throne and the sofa, where they paid homage to Narai by bowing. Siamese attendants took the Shah's letter from Ebrāhīm Beg and placed it on a jeweled glittering receptacle with long gold handle to reach Narai on the high balcony – the same type of device that the De Chaumont had earlier used to deliver Louis XIV's letter to Narai. The Siamese attendant then thrusted the receptacle upward for King Narai to grab the Shah's letter. Narai took the Shah's letter from the receptacle, kissed it, pressed on his head, chest and then placed the letter on a pedastral nearby.

The Siamese minister Okphra Phetracha, called Siyām Petrājā in The Ship of Sulaimān, announced that Narai then allowed the Persian envoys to be seated. Through a translator, King Narai asked whether the Persian king was well and in good health at Khurāsān. Narai misunderstood that the Shah resided in Khurāsān so Ebrāhīm Beg explained to the Siamese king that the Shah lived in Isfahan;

Our king of noble descent, whose armies rival Alexander, whose power equals to that of Jamshīd, bezel in the signet ring of Sulaimān, in brightness like every sun, conqueror of distant lands, was making the capital of Iṣfahān the seat of his world-governing power and the house of the Caliphate. "Praise be to God the source of all bounty." Iṣfahān is the mighty pivot on which hinge doors of prosperity and abundance and the doors of blessed capital open wide before all governors of the eternal kingdom of Iran.

King Narai then asked whether the Shah was engaging in any warfare. Ebrāhīm Beg replied that "all the enemies of our blessed state perish in the desert of their error" and that the Shah's commander was marching into Azerbaijan. Narai then affirmed the Persian envoys that, as their favorable season for departure was still a long time off, the Persian envoys could consider themselves state guests and should inform the Siamese ministers of any needs. The balcony doors then closed and the audience was over.

Two days after the audience, the two Yūzbāshīs came to inform the Persian envoys that King Narai invited them to see the royal Siamese elephant hunt, which was going to take place at Phaniat or the elephant kraal just to the east outside of Lopburi city. The Persian envoys were escorted to ride horses to reach a special pavilion constructed for them, where the Persian envoys waited for King Narai. The royal procession came as King Narai was proceeded by a troupe of barefoot soldiers and elaborately-decorated elephants. King Narai himself rode on a gilded throne on the elephant back. The Persian envoys stood and bowed to King Narai to pay respect and then rode horses to follow Narai to the Phaniat or elephant-catching enclosure. As King Narai took seat on the pavilion, all the Siamese princes and officials prostrated on the ground, while the Persian envoys stood.

Elephant-hunting excursions of King Narai served as unofficial audiences with foreign dignitaries. King Narai had earlier treated the Portuguese envoy De Siqueira and the French envoy De Chaumont with similar elephant-catching experiences. Narai told the Persian delegates that he regretted not having an opportunity to demonstrate the Siamese royal elephant hunt to Ḥusayn Beg the deceased original chief Persian envoy. Ebrāhīm Beg replied that he was willing to sacrifice his own life for the service of the Shah but God had not yet given him a chance. Narai then asked what among his gifts previously brought by Hāji Salim to Safavid court in 1682 pleased the Shah most, to which Ebrāhīm Beg gave an impromtu answer that Narai's royal letter satisfied the Shah most because it represented a sincere friendship.

Depiction of King Narai on elephant back with Siamese officials prostrating on the floor, from Voyage de Siam des Peres Jesuites (1686) by Guy Tachard

Muḥammad Rabī, in his The Ship of Sulaimān, went on great length to narrate the Siamese method of catching wild elephants. Siamese elephant tamers released trained female elephants to attract wild male elephants; "Just like rose-cheeked women that stir up men, these female elephants fix the firm lasso of their attractions about the male's neck". As the male elephant was lured into the Phaniat or catching grounds, the elephant tamers would ensnare the unsuspecting elephant with lasso at its hindleg, tied to a pole. As the elephant was trapped, the tamers rode elephants to surround the caught elephant on all four sides to prevent escape. The elephant behind would thrust the subject elephant with tusks, forcing the subject elephant to walk forward into a lasso at its neck. If the male elephant was large and fierce, it would be lured into an enclosed ground to be caught. Afterwards, the newly-caught elephant would be brought into the stable and, after staying for some days with other tamed elephants, became tamed.

King Narai knew that the Persians loved hunting and horse-riding so he assigned Okphra Si Naowarat Ḥasan ʿAlī the head of Iranian community in Siam to take the Persian envoys to go on a hunting trip arranged by the Siamese authorities. The Persians went to a hunting spot two farsakhs outside of Lopburi, where several tents had been erected and 1,000 Persian and Siamese servants tended to their needs. The Persian envoys rode horses to drive wild animals onto a large net on the ground. During the hunt, a Georgian man fell from his horse and his spear pierced his chest, killing him. After hunting, the Persian envoys performed Muslim prayers and returned to Lopburi. Ḥasan ʿAlī took the Persian envoys on several more excursions and King Narai gave falcons to them for hunting. Ḥasan ʿAlī also took the Persian envoys to visit some Buddhist temples.

=== Makassarese Rebellion of 1686 ===
When the Persian envoys were having audience with King Narai at Lopburi, conflicts had also been brewing in the region. Golconda and Siam had been in friendly commercial relations since 1664 but they went into a mutual trade conflict in the 1680s. Samuel White, an English country trader, had disputes with Ali Beg the governor of Masulipatam, a port of Golconda, during 1680–1681, resulting in his money loss and shipwreck. When Samuel White was appointed by King Narai as the harbormaster of Mergui in late 1683, White used his new position to avenge and press claims on Masulipatam, supported by Narai himself. Meanwhile, Mughal forces conquered Hyderabad the Golconda capital in October 1685, causing Sultan Abul Hasan to take refuge in Golconda Fort. An English captain John Coates, in the name of Siam, seized two merchant ships at Narsapur, another port of Golconda, in November 1685.

This conflict spilled over in March 1686 when another English captain John Cropley, also under Narai's employment, seized an Indian merchant ship originating from Madras near Syriam in Lower Burma. Cropley brought this ship and its crew to Mergui for Samuel White. This action transgressed English East India Company (EIC) of the Fort St. George, who considered these Englishmen under Siamese service as troublesome pirates. This event also coincided with efforts of the EIC to crack down on English merchants who served Asian rulers to compete against the company, called the "interlopers". In July 1686, King James II issued A Proclamation for the Recalling all His Majesties Subjects from the Service of Foreign Princes in East India, ordering all Englishmen to leave employment under Asian rulers to return to the EIC.

Immense influences of Constantine Phaulkon and the French missionaries on King Narai had been upsetting Buddhist and Muslim sectors in Siam. Muslims used to dominate Siam's international trade but they had been outcompeted by these English and French adventurers. Muḥammad Rabī, in his The Ship of Sulaimān, reflected this Muslim view on the pro-French faction by asserting that Phaulkon the "Bastard Christian" had led King Narai into the wrong way, slandering the Persians in the process. Muḥammad Rabī also observed that Narai hired some Franks as pirates to seize merchant ships, referring to the Englishmen plundering ships in the Bay of Bengal under Narai's name.

Image of Makassarese warriors from The capture of Makassar from Gowa rule by the VOC and Bone forces, 1669, by Romeyn de Hooghe

Apart from the Shiite Muslim Persians, there were Shafi'i Sunni Muslims; the Malays and the Makassarese, living in Ayutthaya. In August 1686, a Makassarese refugee prince Daeng Mangalle in Ayutthaya came up with a conspiracy to overthrow the pro-French regime of King Narai, to put a younger half-brother of Narai on the Siamese throne and forced him to convert to Islam; "Turban, or Death". However, this Makassarese Revolt plot soon leaked. A group of Makassarese attempted to flee Siam but were blocked at Bangkok by the governor Okphra Sakdi Songkhram Claude de Forbin, leading to a bloody fight in Bangkok, during which the Makassarese used their sharp kris to cut down European and Siamese soldiers.

King Narai and Phaulkon, who had been in Lopburi, first attempted to negotiate with the Makassarese at Ayutthaya through Okphra Chula Ratchamontri the Lord of the Right Pier (Krom Tha Khwa) and Shaykh al-Islām, nominally having authority over Muslims in Siam. Muḥammad Rabī wrote about this Makassar Rebellion that happened during his stay in Lopburi. Muḥammad Rabī vilified Phaulkon and wrote positively about the Makassar prince, who, according to The Ship of Sulaimān, refused to return allegiance to Narai because he did not trust Phaulkon, who had been stirring suspicion of Narai towards the Makassar prince;

I have no trust in your Majesty, for at the present moment the prime minister is a Frank and a state of mutual hatred based on religious differences exists between him and me. I have no knowledge of any conspiracy but if you suspect me of such intentions, it is clear that your treacherous minister has planted the idea in your head. I know that he bears a grudge against me and that you hold him in great esteem.

When Okphra Chula failed to secure surrender of the Makassar prince, Okphra Chula and Phaulkon led Siamese troops of thousands to successfully put down this Makassar Rebellion in September 1686. Samuel White of Mergui also happened to be in Ayutthaya during this Makassar Rebellion. Captain John Coates, who had earlier seized ships in Narsapur, was killed by the Makassarese in battle. The Makassar prince Daeng Mangalle had a personal grudge against Phaulkon. Despite being shot at right shoulder, Daeng Mangalle charged at Phaulkon with a lance. The unsuspecting Phaulkon blocked the attack with his own lance and then a French gunman shot the Makassar prince to death.

=== Persian envoys in Ayutthaya ===
Abd al-Razzaq Samarqandi, a Timurid Persian writer, in his The Rising of the Two Auspicious and the Confluence of the Two Seas (Maṭlaʿ-i Saʿdayn va Majmaʿ-i Baḥrayn), mentioned Ayutthaya in 1442 as Shahr-i Naw (Persian: شهر نو) or "New City" as one of many trade connections of Hormuz. Muḥammad Rabī, in his The Ship of Sulaimān, called Ayutthaya Shahr-i Nāv (Persian: شهر ناو) or "City of Boats".

After audience with King Narai in February 1686, the Persian envoys stayed in Lopburi for about seven months. In October 1686, King Narai and his court, after staying in Lopburi for eleven months since November 1685, moved back to Ayutthaya for a short stay only for the royal Kaṭhina Buddhist ceremonies. The Persian envoys followed King Narai from Lopburi to Ayutthaya several days later. Muḥammad Rabī noted that the houses in Ayutthaya were more lavishly furnished than anywhere else in Siam.

Depiction of a part of royal procession of King Narai during a Kaṭhina ceremony, a replica from Wat Yom temple in Bangban, Ayutthaya

A few days after, Okphra Si Naowarat Ḥasan ʿAlī, leader of the Persians in Siam, came to ask the Persian envoys whether they wanted to leave Siam at the monsoon wind change or they would stay, to which the Persian envoys replied that they wanted to leave. The Persian envoys, however, refused to take the arduous land journey, crossing the Tenasserim Hills, the same route that they had been through, back to Tenasserim and Mergui to leave Siam on the Tenasserim Coast, for fear that they might not be able to obtain a ship and catch the monsoon wind before it was over. The Persian envoys wanted to leave Siam through the Gulf of Siam instead.

Upon learning that the Persian envoys were to leave soon, King Narai gave the seven members of the mission money and valuable clothes as parting gifts. Ḥasan ʿAlī and the two Yūzbāshīs carried the gifts from King Narai on silver trays to deliver to the Persian envoys;

- The two Qūrchīs or Royal Guards were given 14 catties of money and rolls of Indian clothes valued at 6 catties of silver, for both Qūrchīs.
- Ebrāhīm Beg, a Gholām or servant soldier, who had been elected as the chief envoy, was given 12 catties of money and 29 rolls of Indian clothes valued at 5 catties.
- Muḥammad Rabīʿ ibn Muḥammad Ebrāhīm the chronicler of the mission, author of The Ship of Sulaimān, was given 10 catties of silver and 28 rolls of clothes worth 4 catties of silver.
- Another unnamed Gholām was given money and clothes worth total of 9 catties of silver.
- The Jazāyerī (Musketeer) and the Tūpchī (Artilleryman) were given 7 catties of silver and clothes worth of 4 catties, combined.

Muḥammad Rabī opinioned that gifts from the Siamese king was not generous in comparison to what he had read in the account of the Timurid Persian diplomatic mission to Ming China in 1419–1422, after which the Emperor Yongle gave the Persian ambassadors a vast quatities of valuables. Some days after giving gifts, King Narai at Ayutthaya took the Persian envoys on a riparian boat excursion to Bangkok (Sūhān). The Persian envoys had been in deep financial problems as they had not paid the freight owed to the East India Company for their journey from Persia to Siam. Despite their intention to leave, the Persian envoys and the Siamese authorities were unable to find a suitable ship for them to leave Siam. Muḥammad Rabī blamed the policy of Phaulkon for chasing out Muslim merchant ships from Siam.

=== Farewell audience of Persian envoys with King Narai ===
When King Narai finished his Kaṭhina rituals in Ayutthaya, in November 1686, he invited the Persian envoys to join the annual grand elephant hunt in Lopburi. This was different from the previous hunts as it was a big event, with King Narai himself riding on elephant back and a large number of elephants would be caught in this single occasion. Siamese officials went into the forests, beating drums and firing guns to drive these elephants towards the Phaniat or prepared enclosure. The elephant tamers then rode their trained elephants to surround these wild elephants, pushing them into the enclosure and tying lassoes to their legs. This grand elephant hunt also coincided with the Āshūrā Day, in which the Shiite Muslims mourned the death of Imam Husayn. The Persian envoys then had to return to Lopburi to participate in these events.

According to Muḥammad Rabī, because King Narai had gained his throne with the help of the Persians, the Siamese court sponspored the Indo-Iranians in Siam to conduct Ta'ziyeh mystery play for Mourning of Muḥarram yearly;

The present king of Siam actually came to the imperial throne through the help of resident Iranians who at the time of change in power were performing the taʿziyat in honor of Abū ʿAbdu'llahu'l-Ḥussain. In gratitude for their past service the king has accorded these Mughals the right to perform their religious rites of mourning once a year. The king even demolished a pagan temple in the vicinity of the royal residence and had a mosque with an adjoining upper court built here in honor of the late Āqā Muḥammad.

It was also agreed that every year the king's administration would provide the Iranians with whatever they needed for these ceremonies in the way of furnishings, provisions, drinks, candles, oil lamps and a certain sum of money. This year, as well, the king ordered that these arrangements be carried out, and the Iranians went ahead with their celebration.

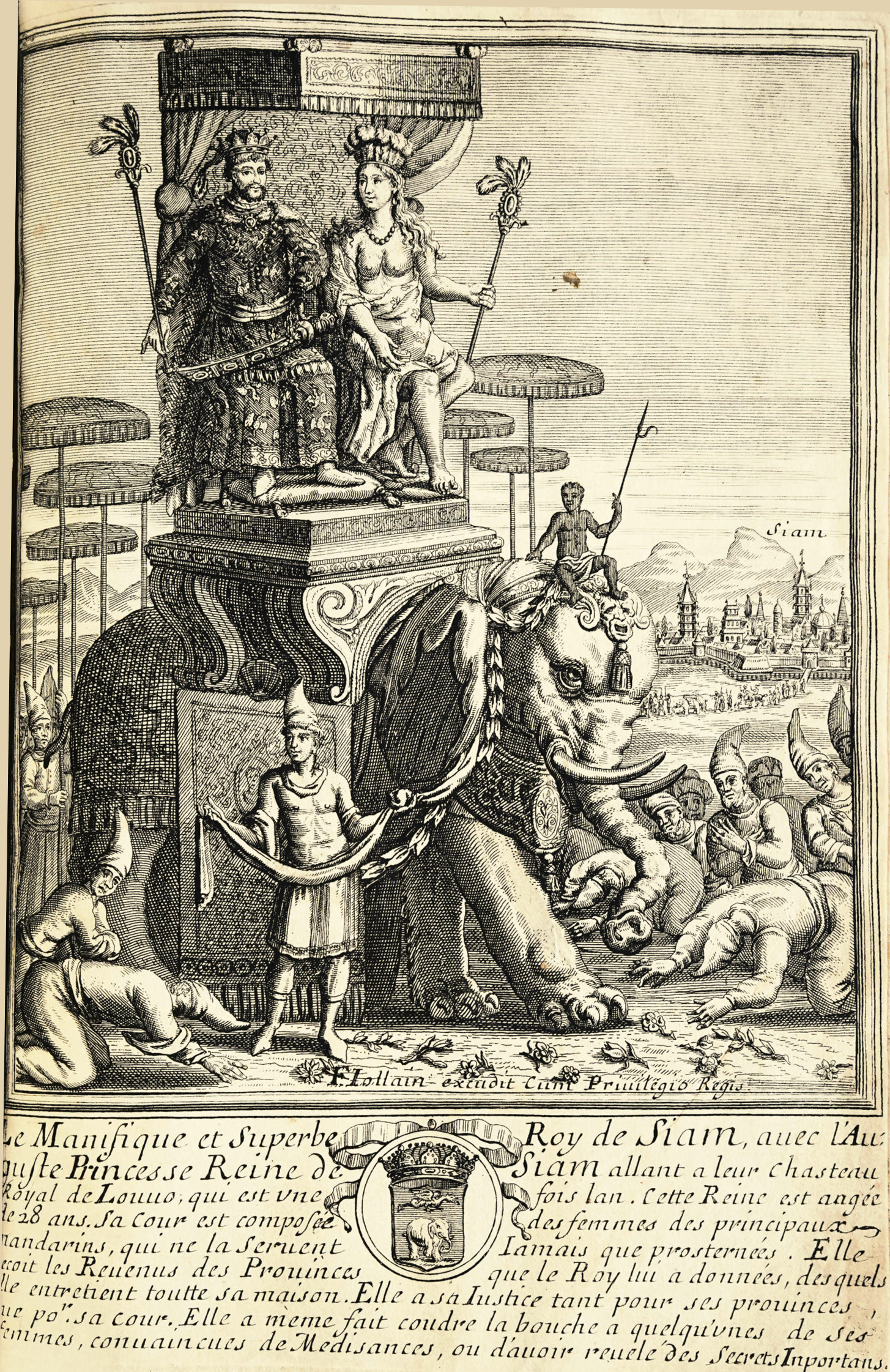
Engraving of King Narai and his daughter Princess Sudawadi (Princesse Reine) on the throne on the elephant back, by French artist François Jollain, c.1686

In Lopburi, during the festival, the Persians envoys were escorted to the mosque everyday, where the Shiite Khaṭīb preacher on the Menbar pulpit cursed and mocked, in loud voice, the infidels (kāfirān), idolaters (but-parastān) and the enemies of the Prophet's House (aʿdā-ye ahl-e bayt). Previous year, the preacher even rode on elephant back to deliver sermons loudly in Lopburi. On the Āshūrā Day of 26 November 1686, the Persian envoys rode horses to join King Narai on the grand elephant hunt two farsakhs from Lopburi. Upon reaching the hunting site, the seven Persian envoys were transferred to ride on seven female elephants on gilded seats waiting for Narai, while other Persian and Siamese officials prostrated on the ground. King Narai arrived on the elephant with his daughter Princess Sudawadi (referred to as "Queen" in The Ship of Sulaimān). Narai then ordered his minister, who rode on the elephant's neck without any seats, to lead the Persian delegates to participate in this elephant hunt.

During this elephant hunt, King Narai summoned the three Persian envoys Ebrāhīm Beg, Muḥammad Rabī and a Qūrchī soldier Mūsā Beg Pīrzāda (Persian: موسی بیگ پیرزاده) to have a private audience on elephant backs. These three Persian envoys observed the elephant hunt besides King Narai. Narai asked the Persian envoys how did the Persians caught wild horses. The Persian envoys replied that horses had been domesticated in abundance in Iran, not being caught, as the Safavid court employed herders to raise young horses. Narai then asked the Persian envoys to make sure that the Shah increased his favor towards Siam, saying that building relationships between rulers was like building a temple or mosque.

King Narai had been reaching out for commercial opportunities in Iran. Narai asked what Siamese merchandise impressed the Shah most. Narai had earlier assigned Hāji Salim to report on this matter but Hāji Salim was too occupied with his own interests. Muḥammad Rabī replied that he did not know. Narai asked further how the Shah used the elephants, to which the Persians replied that the Shah possessed elephants only as symbol of power, not actually using them. Narai then said that he would send young elephants to the Shah. Narai asked Muḥammad Rabī to select young elephants caught on that day to be sent to the Shah but Muḥammad Rabī refused, citing that he had no proper means to transport these elephants back to Persia.

On the last day of the month of Muḥarramu l-Ḥarām, 1098 AH (15 December 1686), King Narai gifted a robe, a turban, a sash and a cloak for each of the seven Persian ambassadors. Next day, on December 16, the Persian envoys had a farewall audience with King Narai at Dusit Sawan Thanya Maha Prasat Throne Hall, the same hall that Narai had earlier received them in February, at the Lopburi Palace. The Persian envoys underwent the same ceremonies as the Siamese officials prostrated on the floor. On the balcony throne, King Narai asked whether the Persian envoys had accomplished their goal in their diplomatic mission to Siam. The Persian envoys replied that they had no other intentions than being under the service of the Siamese king. Narai asked whether they wanted to leave, to which the Persian envoys answered they wished so upon permission of Narai. Narai then brought out his own letter, transferred on the jeweled receptacle to another gilded tray to the hand of Ebrāhīm Beg the chief envoy. King Narai then made a speech to the envoys felicitating the Shah;

May God look over your lord's life and increase his prosperity. May he live a thousand years, for that would give me the greatest joy. Make every effort to communicate my goodwill and sincerity and convey my wish that, God willing, his friends may prosper and his enemies be destroyed. May the king of Iran not forget us in time to come.

As King Narai finished his speech, the balcony doors closed, shutting away Narai and terminating the audience.

=== Departure of Persian envoys from Siam ===
Map of Ayutthaya (1686) by French cartographer Jean de Courtaulin de Maguellon

After the final audience with Narai, the Persian envoys moved from Lopburi to Ayutthaya to prepare to leave Siam. The Safavid court had sent 33 horses as gifts to King Narai. The Persian envoys also brought a large number of their personal horses to Siam and it would be burdensome to carry them back to Persia so they decided to sell the remaining horses in Ayutthaya. However, the Persian envoys could only sell these fine Arabian and Indian horses at low prices because the Siamese had no admiration for these kinds of horses.

The Persian envoys had troubles finding a ship to depart from Siam because the hostilities between Englishmen under Narai's service against other merchants in the Bay of Bengal had been dissuading the Muslim merchants from visiting Siam. Muḥammad Rabī blamed this situation on Phaulkon, who, according to Muḥammad Rabī, had been ordering the Siam-employed Englishmen to plunder Muslim merchant ships. After some months of searching, the Siamese authorities finally obtained a Gujarati merchant ship from Surat named Ruparel (Roporel) for the Persian envoys to leave Siam. This merchant ship Ruparel was decrepit. The Persian ambassadors feared that Narai would call them to Lopburi again and they would not be able to leave within this monsoon season so they decided to take this ship Ruparel, which Muḥammad Rabī compared to an old woman, to leave Siam.

On the 15th of Ṣafar 1098 AH (31 December 1686), the Persian envoys were escorted to the pavilion where Narai's letter had been kept. In a ceremony, Narai's letter was transferred into a box and the two Persian ambassadors; Ebrāhīm Beg and Muḥammad Rabī, put the lock on the box with their hands. The box containing Narai's letter was placed on a litter with reverence, taking passage alongside the Persian envoys to the ship. After the completion of these rituals, the ship Ruparel weighted anchor as the Persian envoys departed from Ayutthaya, sailing out of the Chaophraya River into the Gulf of Siam. These Persian envoys finally left Siam on the 22nd of Ṣafar 1098 AH (7 January 1687), one year and three months after their first arrival in Siam in September 1685.

== Return journey to Persia ==
=== Journey from Siam to Cochin ===
The Persian envoys departed from Siam on the 22nd of Ṣafar 1098 AH, 7 January 1687, on the Ruparel (Roporel Gujarati: રૂપારેલ) to return to Persia. According to Dutch records, King Narai of Siam had given the money of 4,000 rijksdaalders and Indian textiles worth 3,000 rijksdaalders to the Persian envoys. This Ruparel ship, which Muḥammad Rabī called the Kashkūl or beggar's bowl of Angel of Death, was very dilapidated. The Persian envoys had been delayed by the lack of merchant ships coming to Siam and when the envoys eventually departed, the suitable monsoon winds that would propel them back to Persia had been technically over. The Ruparel sailed idly in the Gulf of Siam without propelling winds and suffered from leaks, with water coming in from every direction.

The Ruparel called on Pattani, which Muḥammad Rabī called Paṭānī and described the inhabitants as Sunni Muslims of Shafi'i sect. According to The Ship of Sulaimān, Patani regularly sent golden and silver trees as tributes to Siam. Earlier, Okphra Si Naowarat Āqā Muḥammad, the late Persian confidante of King Narai, had urged Narai to attack and conquer Patani – the success that partly owed to the lack of manliness of the ruler of Patani, probably referring to the fact the ruler of Patani was then female. At the death of Raja Bakal the ruler of Pattani, who left no sons but young daughters, his queen Raja Emas Kelantan succeeded her husband as the Patani ruler. However, Queen Emas Kelantan possessed little actual powers, which laid in the hands of Orangkaya ministers. In 1673, Patani resisted Siamese domination, refusing to send tributes. King Narai sent down armies from Ayutthaya to seize Patani in January 1674. Emas Kelantan kept her rulership but the mastermind minister who resisted Siam was executed. After this Siamese conquest of Patani in 1674, Patani resisted again in 1676.

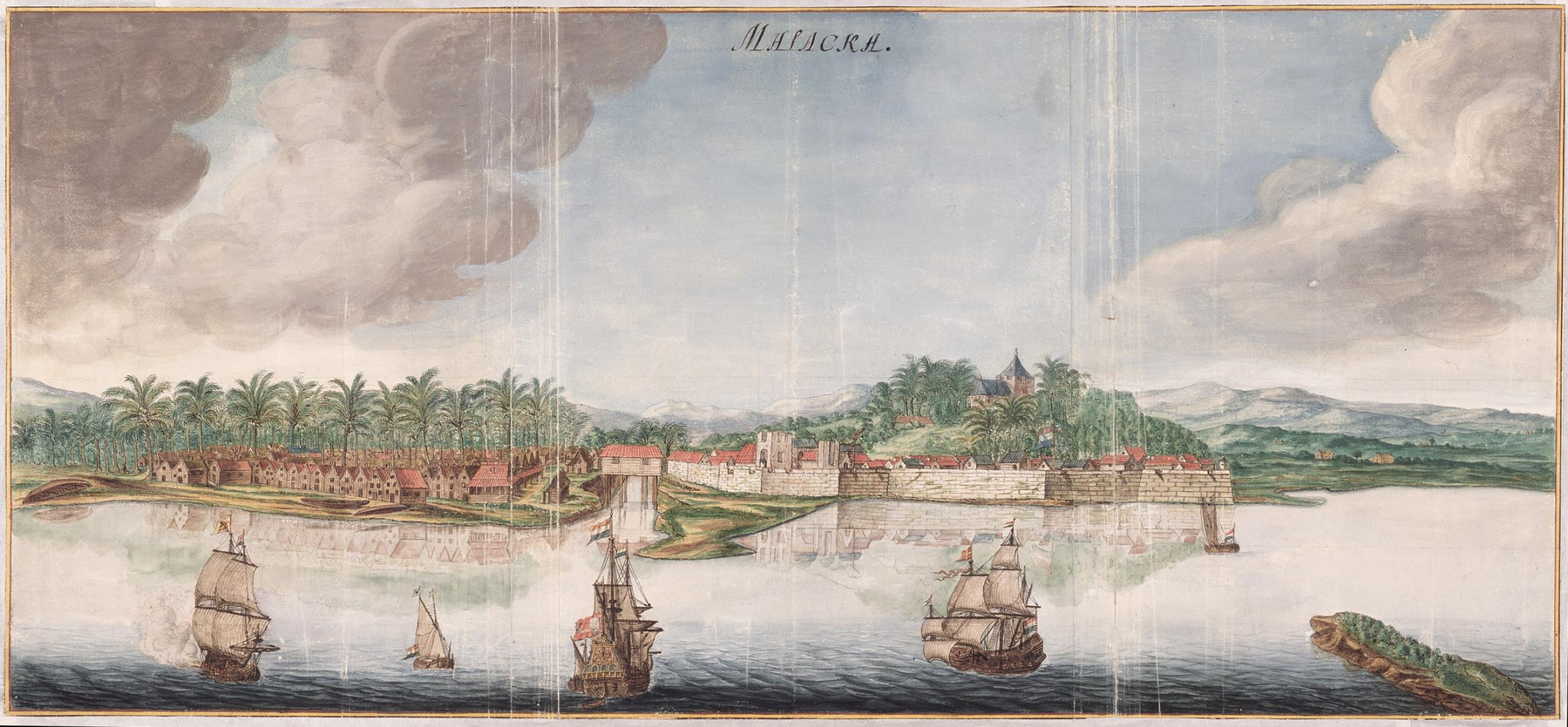
View of Dutch Malacca by Johannes Vingboons, c. 1665

As the Persian envoys chose to leave Siam through the Gulf of Siam rather than leaving at Mergui on the same route that they had come in, the Persians had to circumnavigate the Malay Peninsula. After leaving Patani, the Ruparel wandered along the coast, running aground on a mud once. The Ruparel arrived in Dutch Malacca, which The Ship of Sulaimān called Malāqa, on 22 February 1687, where the Dutch accommodated them well. The Dutch had to gain Persian favor because they had been maintaining trade outposts in Persia. The Dutch recorded that the ship Ruparel was 100 lasten in capacity, carrying twelve guns and 150 people. The Nakhoda commander of the ship was named Makhanji (Maccansie). The Persians envoys stayed in Malacca for about one week and departed on March 1st, passing the Pulau Dinding (modern Pangkor Island, called Pal Dang Dang in The Ship of Sulaimān)

Meanwhile, another French diplomatic mission to Siam, led by Simon de la Loubère and Claude Céberet du Boullay, departed from Brest, Brittany on 1 March 1687 with five ships and French military forces, setting sail for Siam. After leaving Patani, the ship of the Persian envoys "wandered across the sea in confusion", passing through the Malacca Straits. The Persian envoys had been in financial problem, having earlier borrowed the money of 100 pagodas from the English East India Company in Madras. When they were in Bandar Aceh, the chief envoy Ebrāhīm Beg wrote to William Gyfford the EIC Madras President asking for financial support, while also complaining about Siamese reception and treatment on them.

The Persians envoys on the Ruparel transversed the Bay of Bengal and experienced many mishaps, arriving at the Dutch-dominated Cochin, which was called Kūchī in The Ship of Sulaimān, on the Malabar Coast of South India, around April 1687. As the suitable monsoon season had been over and the ship Ruparel had also been damaged, in need for repairs, the Ruparel had to call on Cochin and anchored there, stranding the Persian envoys in Cochin for eight months, waiting for the next suitable monsoon season;

Only after a series of mishaps and much hardship did we arrive in Kūchī, which is the port of the kingdom of Malīwār (Malabar). That port is presently being held by the Dutch. Since by now the monsoon was over and our ship was badly damaged, we were forced to remain in that port for eight months in a state of collapse and ruin.

The medieval Chera kingdom of Kerala, in the twelfth century, fragmented into numerous chiefdoms and city-states. By 1687, there were up to about fifty polities in Kerala, with the most prominent ones being Kolathunadu (Cannanore), Calicut (Kozhikode), Cochin (Kochi) and Venad (Kollam). Muḥammad Rabī opinioned that these local chieftains, who were only about two or three days journey apart from each other, had been declaring themselves kings by simply beating drums without substantial lands, wealth and troops. Muḥammad Rabī observed that Veera Kerala Varma the Hindu rajah of Cochin was powerless and did not have an impressive court, being under influences of his minister and the Dutch.

Muḥammad Rabī learned about the Marumakkattāyaṃ tradition (Malayalam: മരുമക്കത്തായം) of matrilineality-based succession of the Cochin rajah family, citing that when a Cochin rajah died, he was to be succeeded by his sister's son not by his own son. Muḥammad Rabī, in The Ship of Sulaimān, explained the origin of this tradition through a legend of a certain "governor of Malīwār" of the past going to Arabia to convert to Islam. When Prophet Muhammad performed the miracle of splitting the moon into two, this Malabar rajah also saw the same moon splitting and, upon investigation, learned that the Prophet appeared in Arabia.

The rajah then took his journey, along with his family, to Arabia. However, on the journey, the ship sailed into turbulent waters and an angel told the Malabar king in his dream that he should cause blood to soak on the ship's deck in order to survive the calamity. The king's sister offered her own son to spill blood to save them. Upon bleeding of the sister's son, a wind blew the ship to safety. As the Malabar king converted to Islam in Arabia, he declared that his sister was his successor not his son. This story was similar to the tradition of the Malabar Muslims, in which the last Chera king allegedly converted to Islam.

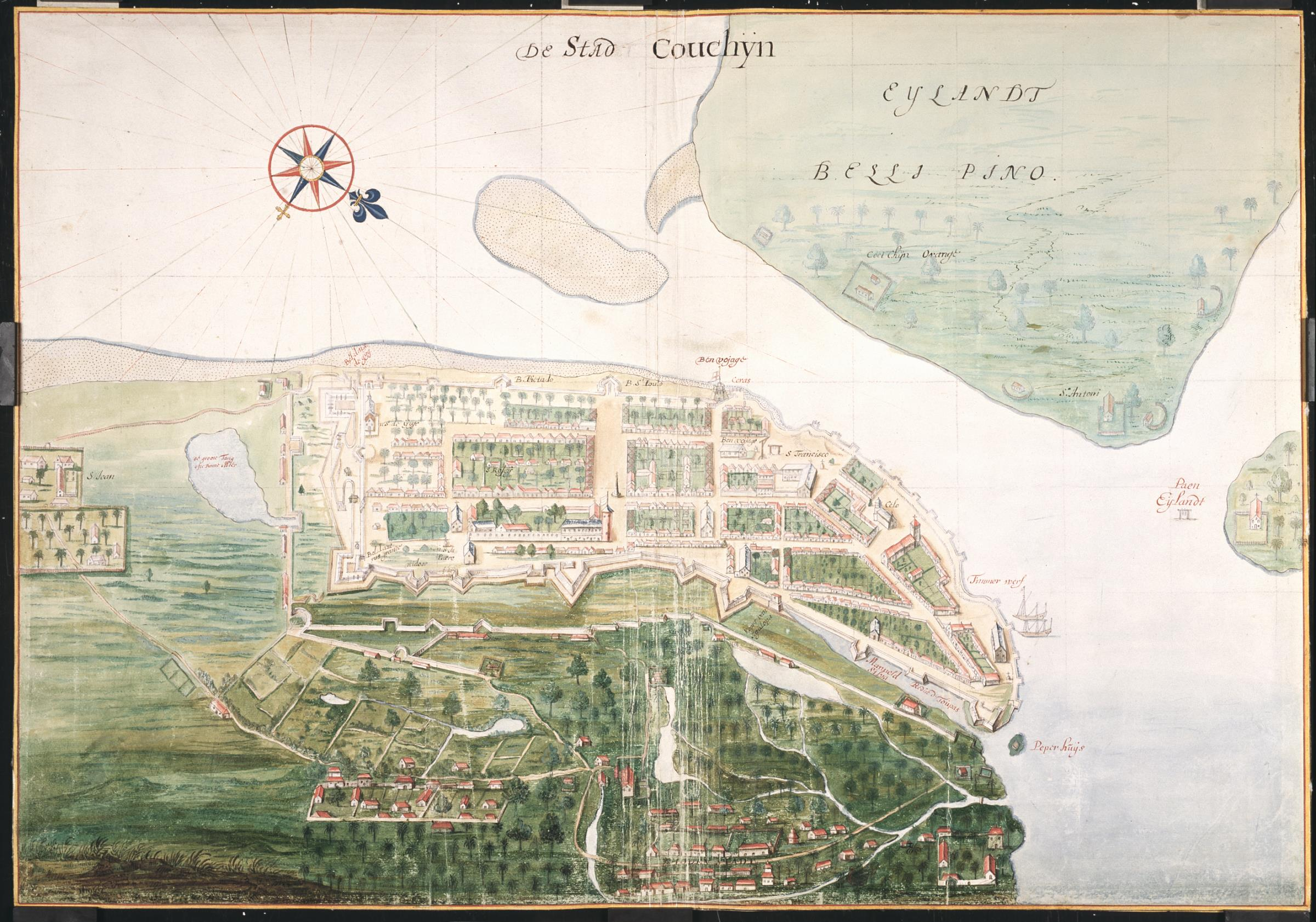
Depiction (1665) of the city of Cochin and Vypin Island, by Dutch painter Johannes Vingboons

During the stay of Persian envoys in Cochin, one Muslim of the party washed his hands at the edge of a pool, which had been reserved as the bathing pool for the rajah and the Hindus, unintentionally violating the ritual purity. The royal guards and a large crowd of people came upon the party with shouting and yelling. The party pleaded forgiveness from the Cochin rajah, which was granted but the rajah ordered the "contaminated" water of the pool to be drained out and the pool was refilled with new water.

Muḥammad Rabī, in his The Ship of Sulaimān, mentioned the Dutch conquest of Cochin from the Portuguese in 1663. According to Muḥammad Rabī, the Portuguese had long possessed Cochin and had built a fort. Some twenty years before arrival of the Persian envoys in Cochin, the Dutch went to war with Portugal (Dutch–Portuguese War), captured all the Portuguese Malabar forts, including the Cochin fortress. The Dutch then installed the incumbent rajah Veera Kerala Varma against the rival rajah as the new King of Cochin and made a deal with him, in which the Dutch would pay even more money to the Cochin rajah than the Portuguese had previously paid, while the Dutch took the profit of maritime trade in Cochin.

Muḥammad Rabī also noticed presence of the Malabar Muslims, called the Mappilas, originating from the local Malayali people converting to Islam or marrying Muslim merchants, in the region. At three days' journey from Cochin, there was a Muslim community "from the stock of Malīwār" who ardently followed the Sunni Shafi'i Islam religion and had learned Quran by heart. Muḥammad Rabī painted these Malabar Muslims as pirates who took Islamic law as justification for their plunder of passing-by ships except for the European ones, claiming that they were doing good works by looting the wealth of the non-believers.

=== Anglo–Siamese War of 1687 ===
Tenure of Sir Josiah Child as the governor of the East India Company (EIC) marked transformation of the Company from a trade cooperation into a quasi-state entity with military forces capable of enforcing its demand on the Asian states, pursuing less diplomatic, more militarily-coercive approach to obtain trade concessions. Armed conflict broke out in 1686 in Bengal Subah between English factors and the Bengal Subahdar over trade privileges, escalating into the Anglo–Mughal War. Sir Josiah Child also actively pursued eradication of the "interlopers" or English traders venturing out into service of local Asian governments, threatening the Company's monopoly.

Order of King James II, which recalled any Englishmen in employment of Asian monarchs, including "Mogul or great King of Indostan" and "King of Syam", back to Company service, reached the Fort St. George in January 1687. On 28 April 1687 O.S. (8 May N.S.), William Gyfford the East India Company President of Fort St. George or Madras issued an ultimatum letter to King Narai, claiming £65,000 damage from attacks on company ships by the English interlopers under Phaulkon's command, also including the debts and freight cost owed by the Persian ambassadors to the Company. The EIC in Madras was then to pacify the English interlopers once and for all by dispatching Anthony Weltden with warships Curtana and James to impose blockade on the Siamese port of Mergui, forcing the interlopers there, especially Samuel White, to surrender.

The English crown had earlier acquired Bombay from Portugal in 1661. Upon the war with Mughal Empire, Sir John Child the EIC Surat President moved his headquarter from the Mughal port of Surat to the English-owned Bombay in May 1687. As the EIC came into conflict with both Mughal Empire and Siam at the same time, Sir John Child of Bombay gave secret orders to Captain Jonathan Andrews, with warship Charles II, to venture out in a privateering mission to seize any Mughal or Siamese merchant ships. A ship from Surat going to Siam was also seized by the Company. Meanwhile, the grand French naval diplomatic mission to Siam under La Loubère reached the Cape of Good Hope in June 1687.

Partie des côtes de Siam, depicting Mergui Archipelago; Siam later lost the whole Tenasserim Coast to Burma in late eighteenth century, becoming modern Tanintharyi Division of Myanmar

Anthony Weltden, with his two warships, departed from Madras in June 1687, transversing the Bay of Bengal to reach Mergui. On 24 June 1687 O.S. (4 July N.S.), on the shore of Mergui, Weltden read King James II's proclaimation to the gathering English people, urging them to quit Siamese service to return to the Company. It turned out that the English in Mergui were more loyal to the King of England than to the King of Siam. Richard Burnaby, who had been appointed Okphra Marit the governor of Mergui by Narai, along with majority of the English, expressed their obedience to King James' order. Samuel White, however, was hesitant and distrustful. Presence of English warships in Mergui also aroused suspicion of the local Siamese, who prepared defenses, causing Weltden to seize White's ship Resolution.

Okya Tanao the Siam's governor of Tenasserim, who was a Persian man, who had authorities over Mergui and who had earlier received the Persian envoys in 1685, mobilized Siamese forces in anticipation of war. Confrontation broke out on 14 July 1687 O.S. (25 July N.S.), when Mergui shore batteries fired upon the English ships, sinking the James. Okya Tanao then ordered the Siamese forces to "kill all English men" in Mergui. Fifty English men in Mergui, including Richard Burnaby the Mergui governor, were massacred. Weltden and White were having a reconcilatory dinner when the Siamese attacked them off guard. Weltden, despite being injured, was able to escape with White. Anthony Weltden took the ship Curtana and Samuel White took his ship Resolution to flee the bloodbath of Mergui. Upon learning of the incident, Narai summoned Okya Tanao the Tenasserim governor to Lopburi to question his unauthorized massacre on the English at Mergui. Okya Tanao was reportedly subjected to severe punishments.

After their escape, Weltden and White wandered in the Bay of Bengal and the EIC at Madras had not been informed about the massacre on the English at Mergui. On 11 August 1687 O.S. (21 August N.S.), King Narai, perhaps at instigation of Constantine Phaulkon, declared war specifically on the English East India Company, not on the English Government. In his declaration, Narai stated that the Englishmen Burnaby and White, who had been in Siamese service, were traitors for collaborating with Weltden. During this Anglo–Siamese War, the French mission was in the Indian Ocean sailing towards Siam. The EIC was alarmed by the news of the French plan to establish a garrison in Mergui. The English would not tolerate the French having forts (Pondicherry and Mergui) on both sides of the Bay of Bengal. The Company managed to obtain a secret order from King James II in August 1687, allowing Elihu Yale, who succeeded Gyfford as Madras President, to seize Mergui should it fall into French hands. King Narai sent the French military officer Chevalier de Beauregard to replace the deceased Richard Burnaby as the new Okphra Marit or governor of Mergui.

Earlier, Ebrāhīm Beg the chief Persian envoy to Siam had written from Aceh to William Gyfford the Madras President at the Fort St.George, asking for financial assistance and complaining about poor treatment they had experienced in Siam. Elihu Yale wrote a reply letter to Ebraim Beague (Ebrāhīm Beg), who was then in Cochin, on 25 August 1687 O.S. (4 September N.S.), sympathizing the Persian envoys on the Siamese reception, saying that they deserved better; "I received an unwellcome account of your unkind entertainment at Syam, the Honour of your magnifficent King and his noble ambassy, and Presents deserved much better", but also urging the Persian envoys to tell the Shah to repay debts and freight cost owed by them and Hāji Salim to the Company because the King of Siam had not reimbursed;

the King of Syam having not yett payd us a cash of the severall sums our people lent you and the Syam ambassadors at Persia [Hāji Salim] and here; nor for the services of our ships that brought you and your concerns hither and carryd you and them all to Tenassery of which I hope and desire you will mind your king of, and that he will please to order the money to be payd to our people according to the severall agreements whereof you had coppys that we may be incouraged by all opportunitys to doe him the like services,

Still not informed about the Mergui massacre, Elihu Yale sent an English warship Pearl from Fort St. George across the Bay of Bengal to reinforce Weltden and to seize Mergui in September 1687. However, upon arrival in Mergui on October 2nd N.S., Mergui had already been under the French governor De Beauregard. The Pearl was surrounded by the Siamese, forced to enter the Tenasserim River and its crew were taken to Ayutthaya.

=== Fall of Golconda Sultanate ===
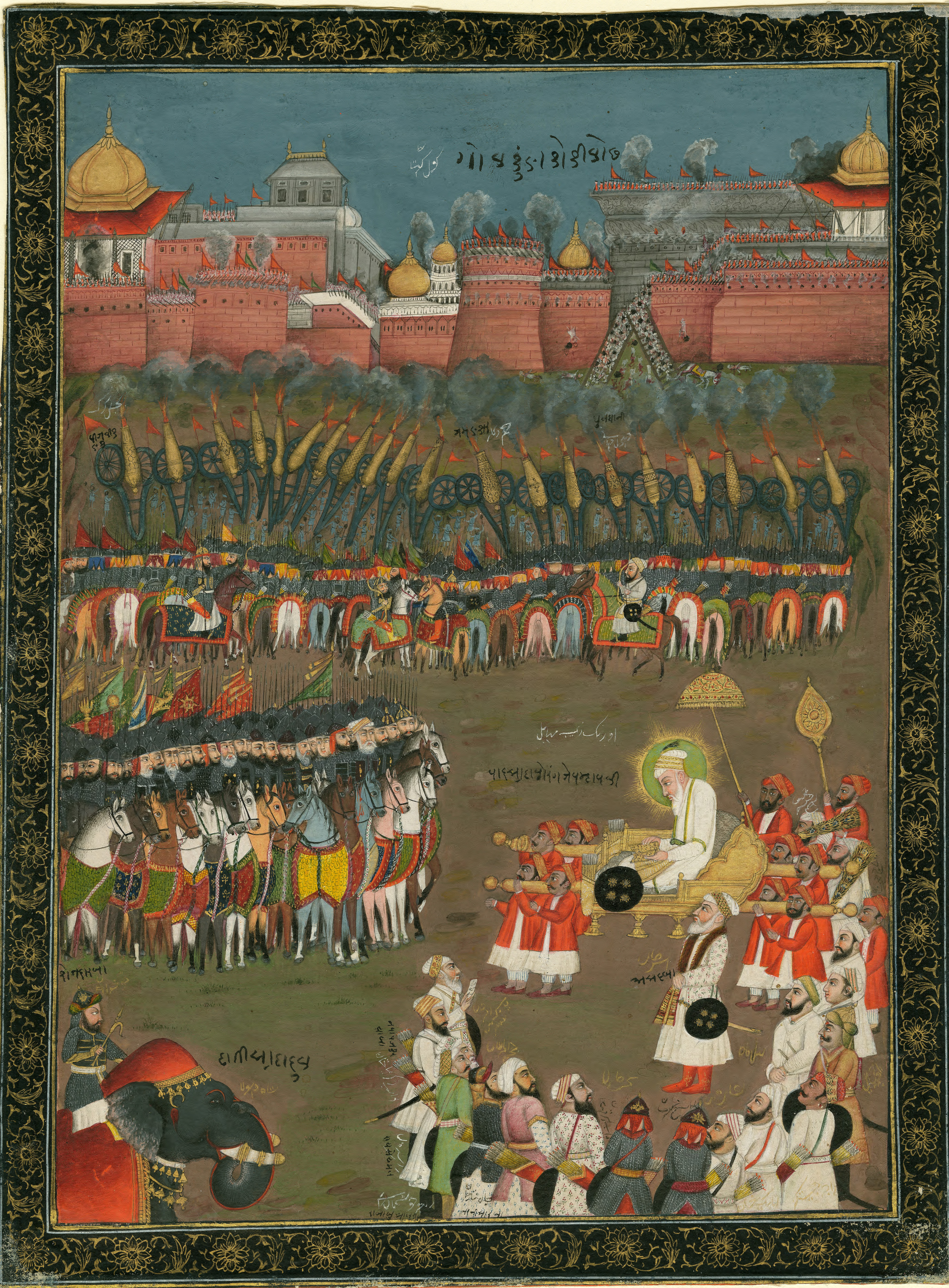
Aurangzeb at the Siege of Golconda in 1687

After eight months of Mughal siege, Golconda fell on 20 September 1687, ending the Golconda Sultanate, the last standing of the Deccan Sultanates. This happened when the Persian envoys returning from Siam were staying in Cochin on the Malabar Coast. Muḥammad Rabī, in his The Ship of Sulaimān, gave a fairly biased and inaccurate account on the event, including a negative assessment of the last Golconda sultan Abul Hasan, who was portrayed as an incompetent and morally-corrupted ruler by Muḥammad Rabī. The ruling Qutb Shahi dynasty of Golconda had been Persianate adherents of Twelver Shia Islam. Upon his ascension, Sultan Abul Hasan, however, dismissed Muslim in favor of the Hindu Telugu officials, who were raised to high power and positions. Muḥammad Rabī regarded Abul Hasan's pro-Hindu stance and his alliance with Sambhaji the Hindu Chhatrapati of Maratha Kingdom (called Sīmājī in The Ship of Sulaimān) against Mughal Empire, as being immoral within their own religion.

Chastised Muslim officials from Golconda went to seek assistance from Mughal Emperor Aurangzeb, who had been on his plan to conquer all of the Deccan Sultanates. Aurangzeb invoked a religious cause as justification of his invasion on Golconda. First, Aurangzeb sent his son Prince Muhammad Mu'azzam or Prince Shah Alam to lead Mughal armies to attack Golconda in 1685. While Golconda was also being attacked by English interlopers under Siamese employment at sea, the Mughals seized Hyderabad, the sultanate seat, in October 1685, prompting Sultan Abul Hasan to withdraw to the nearby Golconda Fort. Subsequent settlement brokered between the Mughal Prince Muhammad Mu'azzam and the Golconda Sultan Abul Hasan resulted in the Mughals leaving Hyderabad with the Golconda sultan paying hefty tributes. However, Aurangzeb did not agree with this peaceful settlement and wanted a full conquest of Golconda.

By 1687, Golconda was the last standing of the Deccan Sultanates. Aurangzeb found the peace conditions unfullfilled and personally led a campaign to lay siege on Golconda, where Abul Hasan had been locking himself in, in January 1687. Aurangzeb also found his son Prince Muhammad Mu'azzam to be in secret communications with the Golconda sultan, leading to Aurangzeb punishing and imprisoning Muhammad Mu'azzam. Aurangzeb offered Golconda Muslim officials many rewards, prompting many of them to defect to the Mughal side. Even before the Fall of Golconda, Aurangzeb declared annexation of Golconda and creation of the Hyderabad Subah as a Mughal province. In the night of 20 September 1687, a defector official open a postern gate of Golconda Fort for the Mughals to enter. Muḥammad Rabī, in The Ship of Sulaimān, identified this defector as Ḥusain Beg from Māzandarān. According to Muḥammad Rabī, Abul Hasan, the last sultan of Golconda, was having a party with Bhang cannabis when he was captured by the Mughals but this accusation was not found in other credible sources. Abul Hasan would spend the rest of his life in captivity in Daulatabad Fort until his death in 1699.

=== La Loubère Mission to Siam (1687) ===
The grand French diplomatic mission to Siam under Simon de la Loubère, consisting of five ships containing French soldiers for occupation of Bangkok and Mergui, arrived at the Chaophraya river bar through the Gulf of Siam in succession from late September to early October 1687.

Upon arrival, the French envoy Simon de la Loubère demanded that Siam allow French troops to station in Bangkok and Mergui, to the surprise of Phaulkon, who expected the French to covet only for Songkhla. Through Guy Tachard, an agreement was reached between La Loubère and Phaulkon that French troops would be admitted into those two towns but under Narai's command, swearing loyalty to Narai and Phaulkon himself. Phaulkon persuaded Narai to accept these French troops that would protect Siam against the Dutch who might seize Bangkok and the English who might seize Mergui. Phaulkon's proposal, however, faced vehement opposition from a Siamese minister Okphra Phetracha, who argued that admitting Western troops would subject Narai to the same fates of being stripped of the state and reduced to captivity as other Indian princes. Nevertheless, Narai considered the French to be allies rather than threats and consented to letting the French troops in.

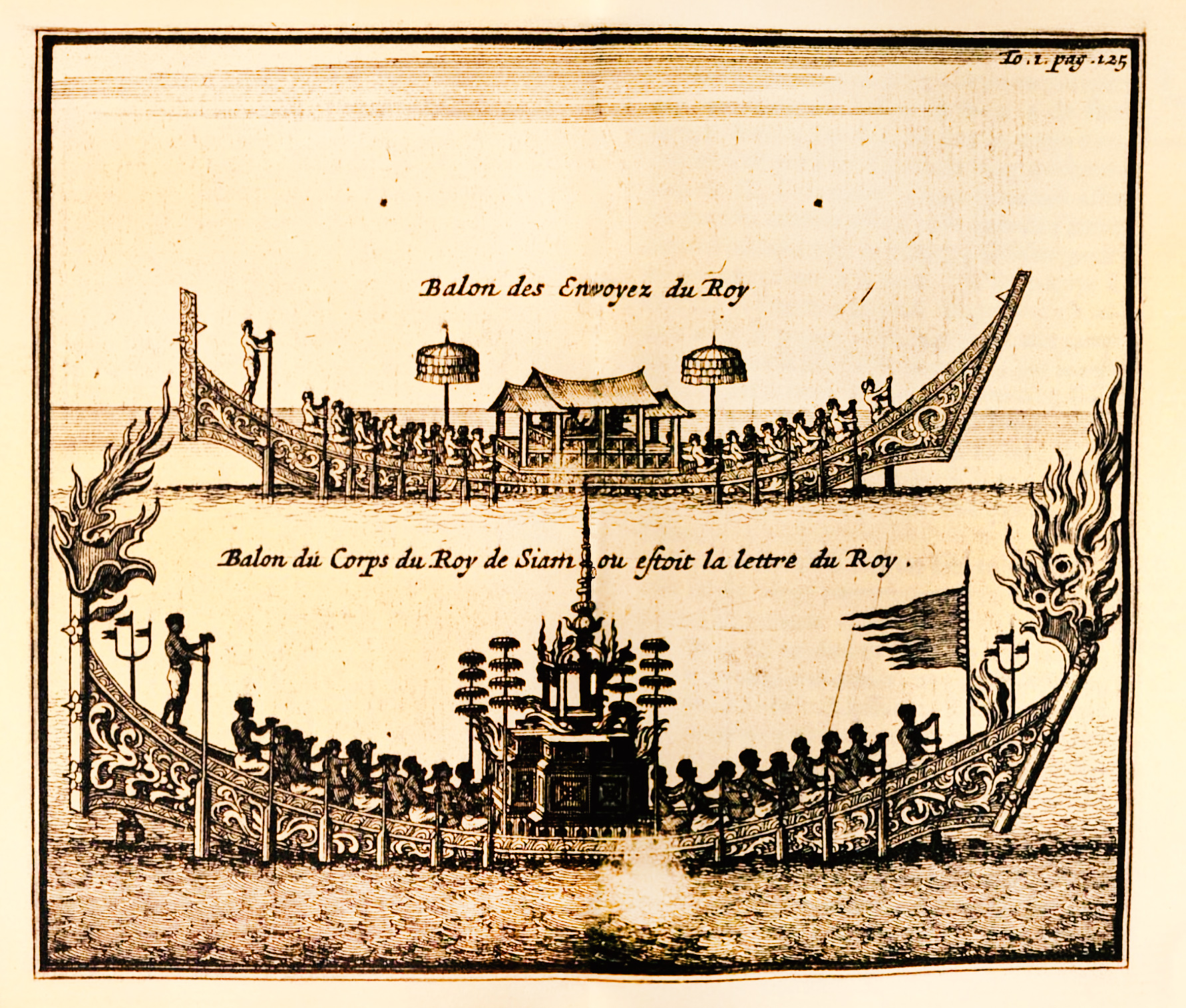
Depiction of Siamese riparian barge carrying the French envoys La Loubère and Céberet du Boullay, adorned with three-tiered parasols (top) and another barge carrying Louis XIV's letter (bottom).

General Desfarges led 200 French soldiers to station in Bangkok. King Narai treated the French envoys with highest honor. On 19 October 1687, La Loubère and Céberet du Boullay were conveyed on a Siamese royal riparian barge adorned with three-tiered parasols, which had been a princely insignia, surrounded by a grand procession, to ascend upstream to Ayutthaya. Upon arrival of the French envoys at Tabanque or Khanon Luang to the south of Ayutthaya on October 23, Narai moved from Lopburi to Ayutthaya to receive them.

In the grand audience with Narai at Sanphet Prasat Throne Hall in the Ayutthaya Royal Palace, on 2 November 1687, La Loubère raised the box containing Louis XIV's letter above his head to present to King Narai, who sat higher on the window balcony, as Narai took the letter directly from La Loubère. After this reception, the French envoys followed Narai to Louvo or Lopburi, where they experienced Narai's wild elephant herding into Phaniat or kraal enclosures on November 18, the exact same rituals that the Persian envoys had earlier witnessed.

Claude Céberet du Boullay, one of directors of the French East India Company, after signing a commercial treaty with Siam, left early to catch the monsoon wind to return to Pondicherry. Céberet du Boullay departed from Lopburi on 13 December 1687 and took the land route to Tenasserim, reversing the same route that the Persian envoys had earlier taken from Tenasserim to Lopburi. At Phetchaburi, Céberet du Boullay met Çelebi the Turkish governor of Phetchaburi who was formerly the Bangkok governor. Céberet du Boullay proceeded to cross the Tenasserim Hills through to the Singkhon Pass to reach Tenasserim on December 30, where "Oya of Tenasserim" or Okya Tanao the governor had been arrested to Lopburi because of his perpetrating role in massacre on the English at Mergui. At Mergui, Céberet du Boullay met De Beauregard the "Opra of Mergui" and departed on January 1st, 1688, for Pondicherry. After wandering in the Bay of Bengal for five months, Anthony Weltden on the Curtana returned to Fort St. George on 25 December 1687 O.S. (4 January 1688 N.S.) and eventually reported the Mergui massacre incident to the EIC. Samuel White on his ship Resolution, however, deliberately avoided the EIC and sailed directly to London to defend himself in court.

=== Journey from Cochin to Bombay ===
The Persian ambassadors returning from Siam had been staying in the Malayali port city-state of Cochin on the Malabar Coast for eight months, having arrived from Siam with the Gujarati merchant ship Ruparel and waiting for renewal of the suitable seasonal monsoon that would take them home to Persia. When the time came around late December 1687, the Persian envoys embarked on the Ruparel to depart from Cochin. The Persian envoys understood that the ship Ruparel would sail directly from Cochin to the Persian port of Bandar Abbas, which would take only one month. However, the Gujarati merchants of the Ruparel had no intentions of going to Persia, poising to return to their homes in Surat. In fact, these Gujarati merchants had been forced by the Siamese government to take the Persian envoys on board with them in the first place.

In the same time, as the Anglo–Mughal War was still going on, Sir John Child the English Governor of Bombay assigned Captain Jonathan Andrews, with warship Charles II, to intercept and seize any Mughal vessels going into and out of Surat. The Persian envoys were still unaware about the ship's genuine destination when the Ruparel sailed northward along Indian Western Coast towards Surat. When the ship Ruparel entered the Konkan Coast, the territory of Maratha Kingdom, which Muḥammad Rabī called "Kingdom of Sīwā" (referring to Shivaji, founder of Maratha Empire), the Ruparel faced attack from a large group of pirates consisting of the smaller twenty-two pirate ships and up to 1,000 armed men. Muḥammad Rabī attributed these pirates to the Marathas;

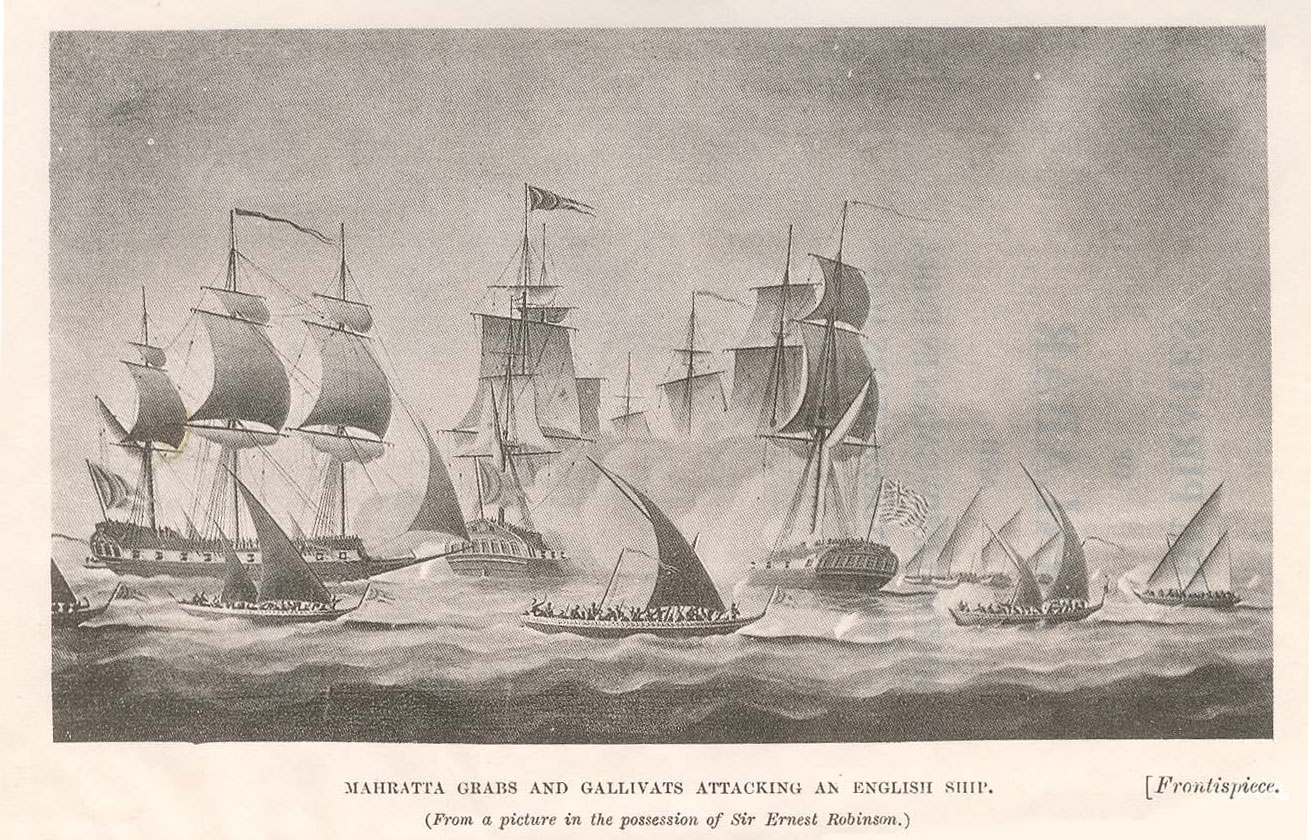
Maratha smaller Gurab and Galbat ships attacking the larger English East India Company merchant ship, from The Pirates of Malabar and an Englishwoman in India Two Hundred Years Ago (1907)

Sīwā is a Hindu and one of the rajahs and landholders of Hindustan. His domain is very extensive and he has a large powerful army. Recently he has turned his head from obedience and discarded his tameness before the Mughal government of Hindustan. He exhales enmity towards the all-powerful Mughal ruler and most of the time he is engaged in launching surprise attacks against the provinces and pillaging the king's lands. This unbridled rebel causes troubles on the high seas in the same manner and maintains many well-outfitted ships for piracy.

By the time of this Maratha pirate attack on the ship Ruparel, Shivaji had died and his son Sambhaji was the Chhatrapati or ruler of Maratha. Even though the Ruparel was an Indian merchant ship, it was still technically a Mughal ship and a potential target of both English and Maratha attacks. The wind died down, rendering the Ruparel unable to sail out of danger. The Maratha pirates beat their kettle drums, bombarded guns and cannons against the Ruparel, with Muḥammad Rabī counting the total of 170 cannon shots. The ship Ruparel, which had already been dilapidated, struggled to resist this pirate attack under leadership of the "two Franks" on board. Several crews of the Ruparel were killed. The Persian envoys reportedly prayed for their survival. The defenders of the Ruparel somehow managed to sink two of the pirate vessels as the ship survived this attack and continued its journey northward. The cannonballs blasted and damaged the luggages on the deck but the Persian trunks containing crowns, account books, an inlaid sword and other articles of formal dress were unharmed.

The merchant ship Ruparel, which had been carrying the Persian ambassadors from Siam on board, reached the Mughal Gujarati port of Surat around January 1688. However, Sir John Child the Governor of Bombay had assigned the large English warship Charles II under Captain Jonathan Andrews to anchor offshore to intercept any vessels going in and out of Surat. Muḥammad Rabī described this English warship as having three storeys, armed with eighty cannons and carrying two hundred soldiers on board. As the English saw the ship Ruparel arriving, the Charles II approached the Ruparel and the English came on board to search and inspect. When the English found out that this ship Ruparel belonged to native Surati merchants and had been with the Persian envoys, the English soldiers came on board and greet the Persian ambassadors with formality and politeness. The English took control of the ship Ruparel and raised the English flag on its mast.

Next morning, Captain Jonathan Andrews came on board to explain to the Persian envoys that he had been assigned to intercept and seize any ships coming from or entering Surat and the cargo would be seized. Presence of the Persian envoys on board had prevented the English from outright pillaging the ship. The English were obliged to seize this ship Ruparel and its cargo due to their origin from Surat and would be sent to the "General" at Bombay. However, belongings of the Persian envoys would not be seized and Captain Andrews offered to escort the Persians on an English ship into Surat, if they wished to do so;

Panoramic view of Surat from Delineatio provinciarum Pannoniae et Imperii Turcici (1687)

We have standing orders to capture any ship belonging to the natives of Sūrat, because your honorable embassy is on board, we have refrained from attacking and pillaging her. We are obliged to take this ship and the owner into custody. However, if you so wish, we will escort you into Sūrat with all you possessions in one of our own ship. All the merchandise now aboard, other than what is yours, will be sent to our gandarāl.

The Persian ambassadors considered going into Surat in an English ship a disgraceful surrender so they decided to keep their dignity by remaining on the Ruparel, which would be taken by the English to Bombay. The Persians speculated that there was a plenty of time left in this suitable monsoon season and the monsoon winds were still strong so they traded their time for dignity, spending time in Bombay rather than in Surat. Captain Andrews then assigned some English soldiers on board the Ruparel. The ship weighted anchor and was taken to Bombay, which was in the vicinity of Surat and was the headquarter of English command, according to Muḥammad Rabī.

At Bombay, called Mumbāi by the Persians, Sir John Child the Governor of Bombay and Captain-General of East India Company forces in India, whom Muḥammad Rabī called "gandarāl" ("General"), personally received the Persian envoys with cordiality and politeness. Sir John Child went on great length to explain to the Persians that the English had been suffering from injustice and ill-treatment from the Indian officials at Surat. Despite presentation of their cases at the Mughal court, insults and abuses on the English were not considered so the English king had assigned himself the gandarāl to impose blockade on the Mughal port of Surat with English warships, hoping that "once the molested merchants were set free, they would complain and advertise what had happened to them. This would draw attention to England's power and position in the world". However, during this blockade on Surat, the English targeted only native Indian ships, not harming any European Christian ships because the Europeans had waged wars among themselves in the past, which "caused many salty tears to be added to the water of the sea".

=== Journey from Bombay back to Bandar Abbas ===
King Narai of Siam assigned the French Jesuit missionary Guy Tachard as his representative in a diplomatic mission to pursue even closer relations with France and the Catholic Church. Tachard was to deliver Narai's letter to King Louis XIV of France at Versailles and Pope Innocent XI at Rome. Tachard left Siam via Bangkok on 4 January 1688 with Simon de la Loubère the French envoy, who had earlier arrived in Siam in September 1687.

Meanwhile, the Persian envoys returning to Siam, still unable to reach their destination of Bandar Abbas, were staying in the English colony of Bombay. Sir John Child the Governor of Bombay saw the dilapidated conditions of the Gujarati merchant ship Ruparel, which had been carrying the Persian envoys all the way from Siam, deemed the ship Ruparel unsafe for travel, urged the Persian envoys not to take the ship any further and promised to obtain a suitable ship to bring them to Bandar Abbas. However, the Mughal Emperor Aurangzeb appointed a new Surat governor who was more friendly towards the English. Upon hearing about this news, the gandarāl Sir John Child hurriedly left Bombay with all his fleet for Surat, leaving no ships to bring the Persian envoys back to Bandar Abbas, stranding them in Bombay for another three months.

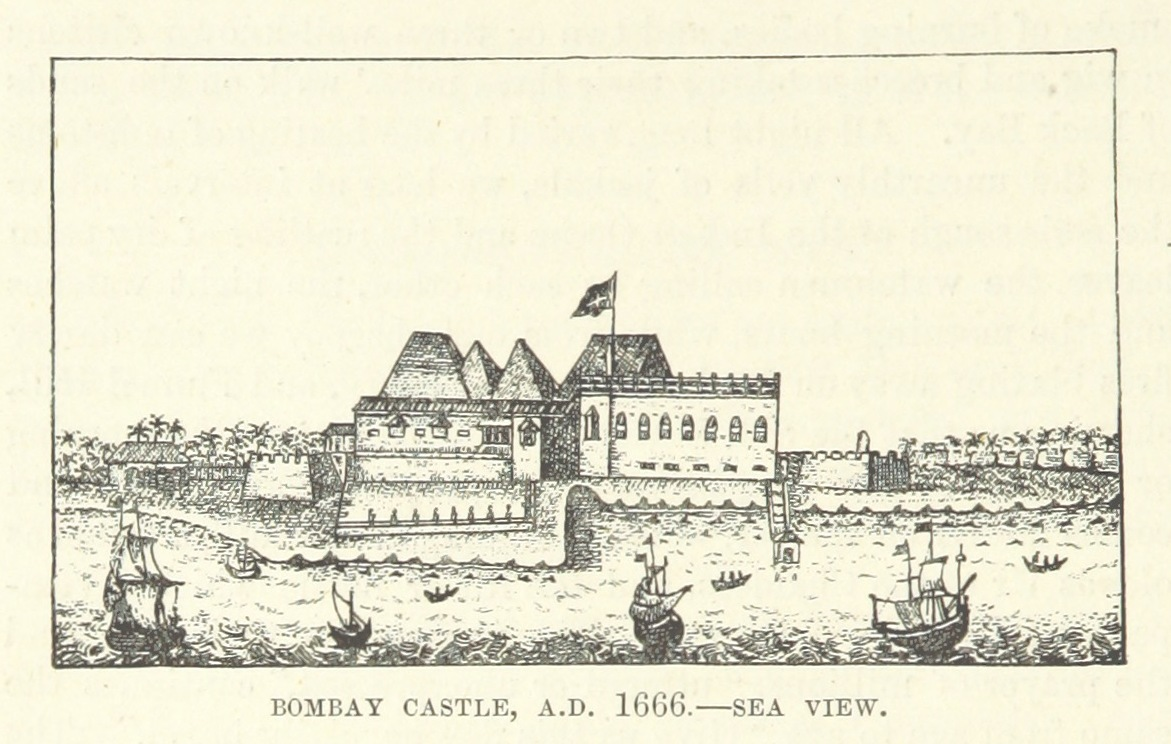
Bombay Castle in 1666, from Bombay and Western India (1893) by James Douglas

The Persian envoys were uncomfortable staying in Bombay, which had not yet been developed into an English administrative center. Muḥammad Rabī described the local Indian population of Bombay as extremely poor to the point that they sold their own children for living; "Mumbāi has a terrible climate and is extremely dirty and lacks almost everything. To keep from starving the natives are forced to sell their own children for two or three thousand dinars". Muḥammad Rabī narrated how the English acquired Bombay from Portugal through marriage of Catherine of Braganza to Charles II of England and how barren it was during the time of his stay;

Formerly this island belonged to the king of Portugal but it was included in the dowry that his daughter brought with her when she married the son of the king of England. The island is empty and barren, extremely barren and devoid of anything that could be useful. Since they had no other place for their ships in the vicinity of Hindustan, the English settled this island and now keep it as a naval base. Mumbāi has nothing to export and is mostly a cause of additional expenses for the English.

At Siam, French commander Sieur du Bruant brought 90 French soldiers to station in the Siamese port of Mergui in March 1688. King Narai also became seriously ill in March, becoming unable to govern. As he had no sons, only a daughter, Narai had adopted Phra Piy, a son of a Siamese nobleman, as an adopted son but Narai himself had not clearly named a successor. Prince Phrapiy had converted to Catholicism and had been under Phaulkon's influence. Okphra Phetracha the leader of Buddhist anti-French nationalist faction began to secretly rally the anti-French cause. Phetracha convinced the Siamese Buddhist monks that the French was going to impose Christianity on Siam by force and all the Buddhist temples would be destroyed. Phetracha also spread fear that the Siamese populace would lose liberty under French domination. Narai's Persian palace guards also joined Phetracha in this anti-French, anti-Phaulkon coalition.

After staying in Bombay for three months and a half, the Persian ambassadors returning from Siam finally departed from Bombay on the 5th of Jamīdu'th-Thānī 1099 AH (7 April 1688) on a small private English ship they rented. The ship soon encountered the formidable Sanganian (Sankālī) and Warrel (Vārīl) pirates upon reaching the Kathiawar Coast; "We encountered two ships of the Sankālī and the Vārīl who are from among the Indian peoples. They live in the vicinity of Hindustan and are extremely bloodthristy." The Sanganians and the Warrels possessed well-armed vessels and were highly-skilled in looting and piracy. The Sanganians originated from Kutch with main base at Beyt Dwarka, while the Warrels were based on the Kathiawar coastal strip between Diu and Ghogha.

The English ship carrying the Persian envoys was attacked by two pirate vessels, a Sanganian ship and a Warrel ship, from both sides, being continuously bombarded with cannon fires until nightfall. During the night, as the wind died down, the ship was unable to sail out of danger, drifting in the sea with two pirate vessels flanking on both sides. The pirates threatened to kill everyone on board if they did not surrender peacefully. Upon sunrise, the two pirate ships resumed bombarding. Due to the lack of propelling winds, the two pirate ships were unable to make contact with the English ship, which was also unable to escape. According to Muḥammad Rabī, the English crew on the ship were unwilling to surrender because they were told by their king never to give up their ship, preferring to die rather than facing punishments back home. The English put up gunpowder and explosives on the deck, preparing to detonate upon pirate seizure of the ship, killing everyone on board. The English ship and the pirates were in a stalemate for three days until a wind blew the ship out of the reach of these pirates.

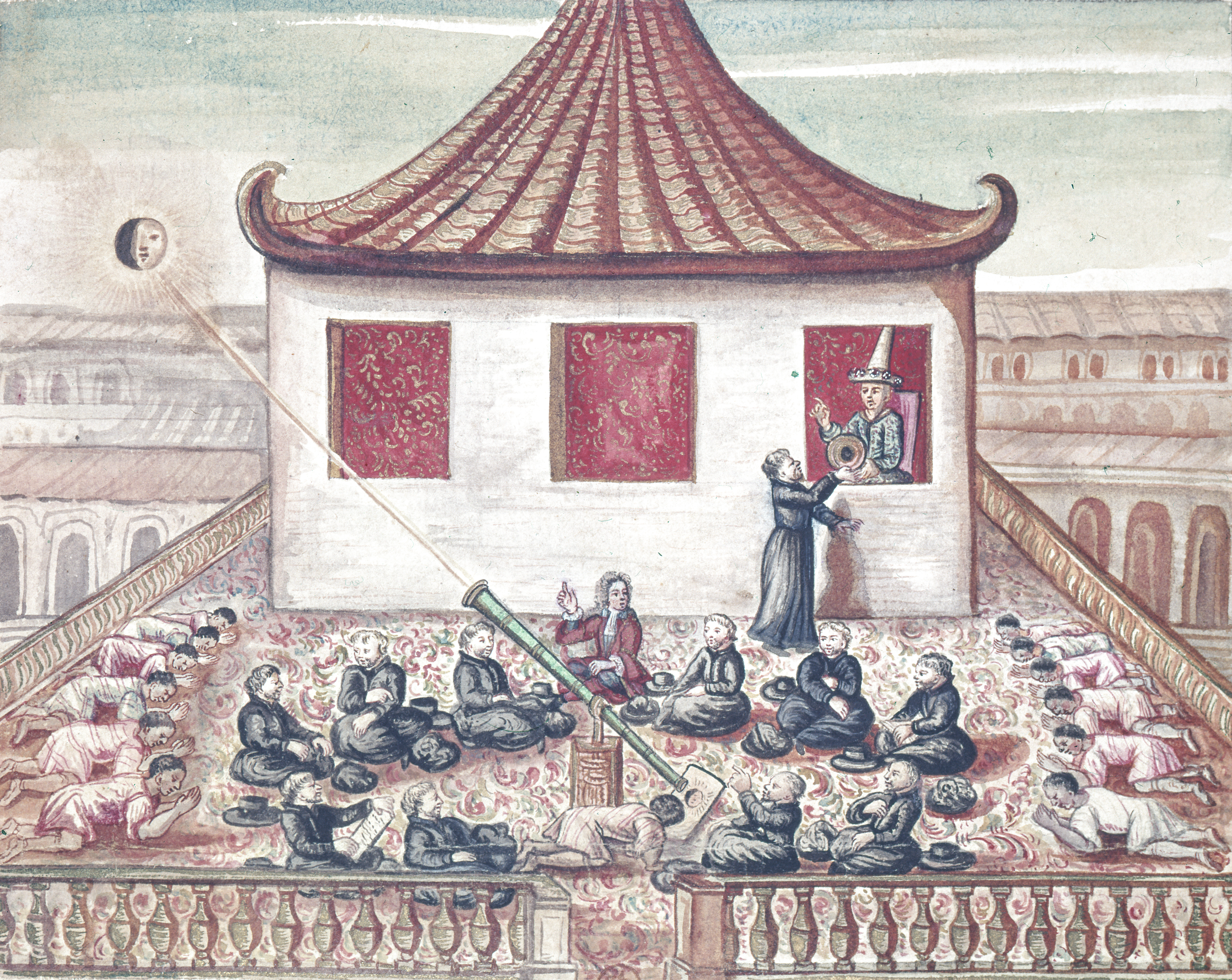
Depiction of King Narai observing solar eclipse with the French Jesuits at Lopburi or Louvo in April 1688

Constantine Phaulkon soon discovered Phetracha's anti-French conspiracy. Phaulkon chose not to expose Phetracha outright but rather summoned Desfarges the commander of French troops at Bangkok on March 31 to discuss how to deal with Phetracha. Phaulkon and Desfarges planned to counteract by bringing French troops from Bangkok to arrest Phetracha. Desfarges marched 75 French soldiers from Bangkok to reach Ayutthaya on 15 April 1688. However, false rumors spread to Ayutthaya that King Narai had died in Lopburi. The French in Ayutthaya dissuaded Desfarges from actually going to Lopburi for there was nothing Desfarges could do there to save the situation and told Desfarges that he had better guard Bangkok. Desfarges then returned to Bangkok, leaving Phaulkon to fatal consequences in Lopburi.

On 17 May 1688, Prince Phrapiy informed his adoptive father the ailing King Narai about Phetracha's plot. Narai ordered Phetracha arrested but Phetracha acted first. On the fateful day of May 18, Phetracha raised a Buddhist mob under the Sangharaja or Buddhist Hierophant of Lopburi, with the Muslims providing horsemen, to successfully seize Lopburi Royal Palace. Phetracha took control over Siamese royal court, kept King Narai as a prisoner in his own bedchamber and arrested both Phrapiy and Constantine Phaulkon. Phrapiy was soon executed and Phaulkon was subjected to a multitude of tortures including wearing the severed head of Phrapiy at his own neck.

When Phetracha's coup was happening in Siam, the Persian envoys returning from Siam were still on the English ship in the Arabian Sea. The Persian envoys reached the Persian port of Bandar Abbas in the Straits of Hormuz on the 24th of Rajab 1099 AH (25 May 1688) on the private English merchant ship from Bombay, three years after their departure from Bandar Abbas for Siam on the 25th of Rajab 1096 AH (27 June 1685).

== Subsequent Events ==
=== Siamese Revolution of 1688 ===
Greek adventurer and former English East India Company employee Constantine Phaulkon had become de facto Chief Minister and a reliable confidante of King Narai of Siam under Siamese noble title Okya Wichaiyen. Phaulkon approached France for protection against potential threats to Siam, such as the Dutch and the English, also for protection against his own political adversaries, proposing for French military presence in Siam. Rise of Phaulkon and French influence upset Buddhist and Muslim sectors. Arrival of French military troops as the part of diplomatic mission under Simon de la Loubère in October 1687 enraged Phetracha the leader of Buddhist nationalistic faction who argued against allowing French garrisons in Siam. Phetracha was a foster brother of Narai. Phetracha's mother had been Narai's wet nurse. French commander General Desfarges brought 200 French soldiers to station in Bangkok and Sieur du Bruant brought 90 French soldiers to Mergui.

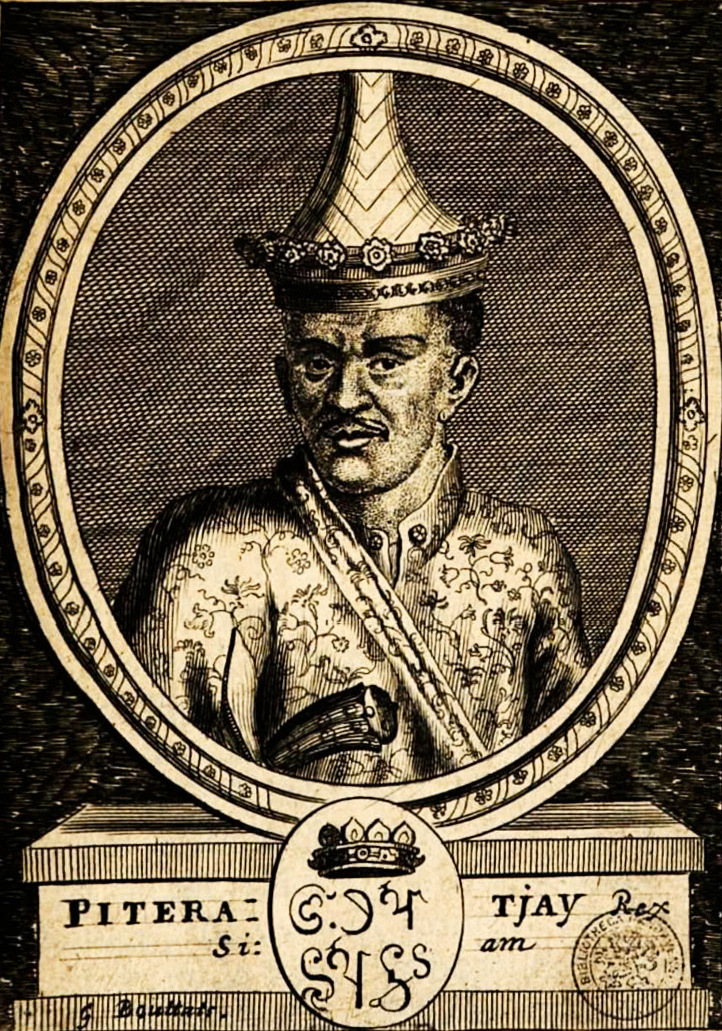
Phetracha seized power in May 1688, executing Constantine Phaulkon in June and, after the death of Narai in July 1688, ascended as King of Siam of the new dynasty.

By the time of his terminal illness in March 1688, Narai had no sons, only a daughter Princess Sudawadi. Narai also had two younger half-brothers who were powerless. Narai had adopted Phrapiy, son of a noble, as his adopted son. Phrapiy converted to Catholicism and had been under Phaulkon's influences. In March 1688, upon Narai's illness, Phetracha formed an anti-French conspiracy, spreading fear that the French were going to destroy Theravada Buddhism and impose Christianity on Siam. Phaulkon soon discovered Phetracha's plot and asked Desfarges to bring French forces from Bangkok to arrest Phetracha in Lopburi. However, upon reaching Ayutthaya in April 1688, Desfarges was dissuaded by false news that Narai had died and returned to Bangkok instead of helping Phaulkon.

On 17 May 1688, Phrapiy exposed Phetracha's conspiracy by telling Narai that Phetracha had been recruiting Buddhist monks, nobles and commoners in an anti-French plot. Narai ordered arrest of Phetracha but Phetracha acted first. Next day, on May 18, Phetracha raised a popular mob under leadership of the Sangharaja or Buddhist Hierophant in Lopburi to seize control of Lopburi Royal Palace. Narai's Persian guards joined Phetracha's coup as horsemen. Constatine Phaulkon and Phrapiy were arrested and Narai became a prisoner in his own palace. Phetracha also arrested Okphra Chula the Shaykh al-Islām, who had been a political ally of Phaulkon. Phrapiy was soon executed. Phetracha forced Phaulkon to go through many tortures, including hanging the severed head of Phrapiy on his own neck. Ayutthayan populace accepted Phetracha's coup at Lopburi, hailing Phetracha as "Liberator of Fatherland and Preserver of Religion".

With Ayutthaya and Lopburi under his control, Phetracha proceeded to deal with the French at Bangkok and Mergui. Phetracha summoned Desfarges from Bangkok. Desfarges did go to meet Phetracha at Lopburi on June 2 without rescuing Phaulkon, who had been under captivity and torture. Desfarges initially pretended to cooperate with Phetracha and returned to Bangkok. Phetracha assigned his son Luang Sorasak to bring Phaulkon to execution at Wat Sak Temple in northern vicinity of Lopburi on 5 June 1688, ten days after the return of Persian envoys to Bandar Abbas. The executioner slashed through the body of Phaulkon with a sword, a tragic end to a foreigner who had risen to power and influence in Siam. Upon his return to Bangkok on June 6, Desfarges chose armed resistance and prepared defenses. Siamese forces then attacked Desfarges' Bangkok Fort, leading to the Siege of Bangkok that would last five months.

Okya Tanao the earlier governor of Tenasserim, who had massacred the English at Mergui in 1687, was arrested to Lopburi and executed. There was a new governor of Tenasserim in early 1688. By the time of Phetracha's coup, Mergui the Siamese port on the Andaman Sea was under French officer Chevalier de Beauregard the Okphra Marit or Siam-appointed governor of Mergui. Sieur du Bruant also had 90 French soldiers under his command in Mergui. In late May 1688, after the coup, Phetracha sent the Tenasserim governor to bring Siamese forces to lay siege on the French at Mergui. This siege of Mergui lasted for one month until late June when the French decided to evacuate. Chevalier de Beauregard and Sieur du Bruant seized the Siamese frigate Mergui to depart with surviving French soldiers on 28 June 1688. De Beauregard and Du Bruant on the Mergui visited Burmese Tavoy asking for supplies but the Burmese detained De Beauregard. Du Bruant on the Mergui could only escape Tavoy with some clashes with the Tavoyans, eventually reaching Pondicherry but De Beauregard was captured, enslaved and later died somewhere in Burma.

By July 1688, French influences in Siam had all gone, with Desfarges still resisting the Siamese siege on Bangkok. Phetracha decided to take Siamese throne himself. Phetracha had two younger half-brothers of Narai executed at the same Wat Sak Temple that Phaulkon had been killed, eliminating any potential heirs. All these events happened when Narai was still alive on his deathbed at his Lopburi Palace. Narai eventually died on 11 July 1688; "being about 55 years of age when he died, after he had governed this kingdom in peace ... for 31 years, 8 months and 14 days with the greatest glory and reputation" according to the Dutch VOC Ayutthaya Opperhoofd Johannes Keyts. Phetracha abandoned Lopburi or Louvo as the royal seat, donating the Lopburi Palace to the Buddhist monks.

=== Ascension of King Phetracha ===
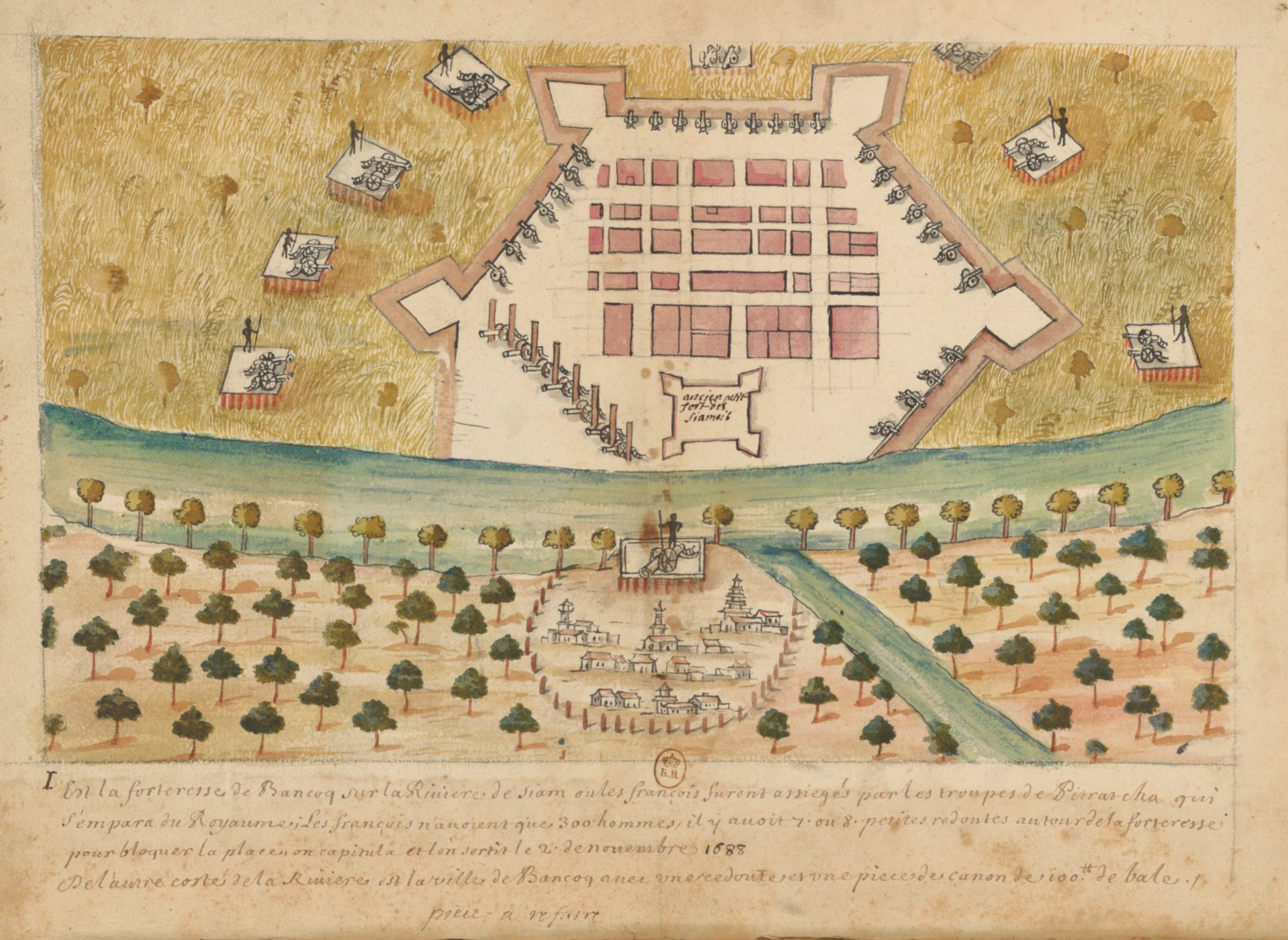
Depiction of the large Bangkok Fortress held by General Desfarges in modern eastern bank of Bangkok under siege of Siamese forces in 1688

On 1 August 1688, Phetracha took the body of Narai on a grand riparian procession from Lopburi down to Ayutthaya. On the same day of August 1st, at Ayutthaya, Phetracha held enthronement ceremony as the new king of Siam of the Ban Phlu Luang dynasty that would rule Siam to the Fall of Ayutthaya in 1767. Phetracha made Narai's daughter his new queen, giving her title Queen Kromma Luang Yothathep. His son Luang Sorasak was made Uparaja Prince of the Front Palace or heir presumptive. Among Phetracha's supporters were the Muslims and the Persians, who had been dissatisfied at Phaulkon and the French. Phetracha appointed his supporters to high positions;

- Okphra Wisut Sunthorn Kosa Pan, the leading Siamese ambassador to France in 1686, was made the new Phrakhlang or Siamese Foreign Minister under Phetracha.
- A Persian named Mameth Couli was made the governor of Phitsanulok the principal city of Northern Siam.
- A Pathan man serving in Siam named Hussein Khan was made Okya Thepracha the commander of royal elephants, the same position as Phetrecha in the reign of Narai.

While the Siamese were besieging the French forces under Desfarges at the Bangkok Fort, King Phetracha and his Foreign Minister Phrakhlang Kosa Pan negotiated for a peaceful departure of the French from Siam. After nearly five months of siege, an agreement was reached on 27 October 1688 that Desfarges and the French soldiers in Bangkok, the last bastion of French presence in Siam, would leave Siam without harm, with hostages exchanged to guarantee the terms. Desfarges and the French left Bangkok on November 2 but Desfarges took the Siamese hostages with him to Pondicherry, enraging Phetracha and Kosa Pan, who put the remaining French Catholic missionaries, French merchants and soldiers in Ayutthaya through gruesome tortures and imprisonment, killing some of them.

Phetracha's supporters, who initially supported his coup to oust the French, were dissatisfied that Phetracha took the throne himself instead of allowing Narai's younger brother to reign. In January 1689, Okphra Chaithan (Opra Tjetincq) the governor of Tenasserim, a Persian man, who had earlier expelled the French from Mergui, rebelled against Phetracha. This Tenasserim rebellion made Phetracha suspicious of all the Persian officials, most notably Okphra Si Naowarat, head of the Persians in Siam. Phetracha recalled the Persian Mameth Couli from governorship of Phitsanulok, replacing him with a Siamese governor. Phetracha sent Phrakhlang Kosa Pan and Okya Thepracha Hussein Khan to bring forces of 20,000 men to suppress Tenasserim rebellion in March 1689. Okphra Chaithan the Tenasserim governor was arrested, put in chains and taken to Ayutthaya.

Among the rebels caught from Tenasserim was a Mon Buddhist monk named Thammathian, who used to serve a younger brother of Narai before execution of that prince. Thammathian escaped and went to gather supporters among the rural people of Nakhon Nayok, Saraburi and Lopburi to the northeast of Ayutthaya into a Narai loyalist uprising against Phetracha. Thammathian impersonated and claimed to be the younger brother of Narai who survived the execution. In April 1689, Thammathian marched his popular army to attack Phetracha's son Sorasak at Phaniat to the north of Ayutthaya. Phetracha finally put down this rebellion. Phetracha found out that some Persians in his court supported Thammathian. Okphra Ratchamontri the Syahbandar, whose father was Moorish (in this context, Persian) and mother Siamese, was executed for his implication in the rebellion. Phetracha reportedly said to the Persian headman Okphra Si Naowarat that, despite Phetracha's favor towards them; "the privileges which they would not have had in their own land", the Persians in Siam were ungrateful to him.

=== Settlement of Hāji Salīm's debts ===
Hāji Salim Māzandarāni or Ḥājjī Muḥammad Salīm, who had been sent by King Narai as Siam's envoy to Persia in 1682, borrowed the money of 100 Tabriz toman from the Dutch East India Company (VOC) factory in Isfahan. Hāji Salim then borrowed more money from the Dutch to the total of 85 catties of silver. Hāji Salim departed from Persia at Bandar Abbas with the Persian ambassadors to Siam in 1685. At the Fort St. George, the Persian Embassy borrowed 100 pagodas from the English East India Company (EIC) and Hāji Salim borrowed 100 pagodas. The EIC also provided the Persian envoys with vessels to transport them from Persia to Siam. However, this service was not free. Neither the Persian envoys nor King Narai had paid this transporation fee. In Siam, Constantine Phaulkon pressed charges of corruption against Hāji Salim for his accumulated debts, leading to imprisonment of Hāji Salim. When the French ambassador Simon de la Loubère visited Siam in 1687, Hāji Salim was still in prison. Hāji Salim seemed to be released upon Phetracha's coup and Narai's death in 1688.

In April 1687, the EIC at Madras pressed King Narai to repay the debts owed by Hāji Salim and the Persian ambassadors. Relations between EIC and Siam spiraled into Anglo–Siamese War. On their return journey to Persia, during their eight-month stay in Cochin, the Persian envoys borrowed another 1,500 rijksdaalders from the VOC there. When the Persian envoys returned to Bandar Abbas in May 1688, the VOC in Bandar Abbas reminded the Persian envoys to repay their debts. The Persian envoys complained about harsh treatmen they received from the English, which was supposedly about being stranded in Bombay for three months against their will. The envoys themselves did not have enough money to make journey to Isfahan with their cargo and pleaded the Grand Vizier Shaykh Ali Khan Zanganeh for support. The Dutch VOC petitioned the Grand Vizier Shaykh Ali Khan Zanganeh to repay debts the Persian envoys had owed to them, along with the written account of the envoys themselves. However, the Grand Vizier refused to repay the debts, arguing that the Dutch instead owed a large sum of unpaid duties to the Persian court. Death of the Grand Vizier in October 1689 further stalled the issue.

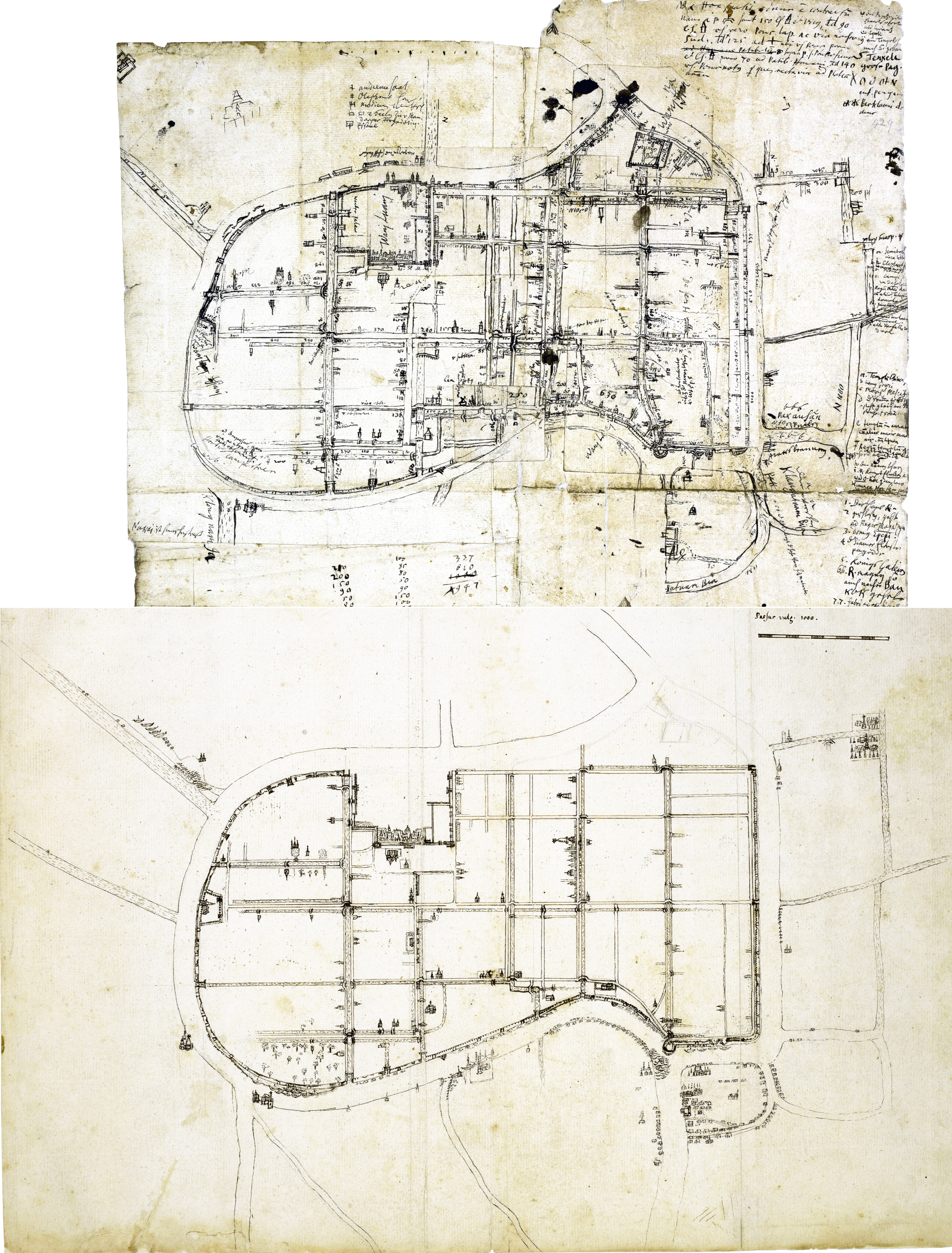
Sketch (above) and improved (below) maps of the Ayutthaya city (1690) by Engelbert Kaempfer.

When the Persian envoys visited Siam during 1685–1686, according to The Ship of Sulaimān, two sons of Āqā Muḥammad Astarābādī, Chū Chī and Chū Kīā, had been exiled to distant provinces since the death of their father in 1678. Chū Chī and Chū Kīā returned and entered Siamese court in the reign of Phetracha. Chū Chī became Okya Si Chaihannarong, another Persian governor of Tenasserim, while his younger brother Chū Kīā became Okluang Sriyos the Syahbandar of the Right Pier (Kromma Tha Khwa), also probably Shaykh al-Islām.

The Dutch welcomed the new king Phetracha as they shared anti-French sentiments. The Dutch were also directly benefitted from the collapse of French influences over Siam, which had been compromising Dutch–Siamese relations. In 1689, King Phetracha and his Foreign Minister Phrakhlang Kosa Pan wrote letters to Johannes Camphuys the Dutch Governor-General of East Indies at Batavia, asking to restore relations. Camphuys, however, took this opportunity to assign Pieter van den Hoorn the VOC Opperhoofd in Ayutthaya to urge the Siamese government of Phetracha, through Phrakhlang Kosa Pan, to repay many debts, including the debts that Hāji Salim had been owing to the VOC from his loans in Isfahan. Kosa Pan initially believed that Hāji Salim should repay his debts and collaborated with the Dutch by forbidding Hāji Salim from leaving Siam.

Hāji Salim, however, defended himself by showing Phrakhlang Kosa Pan a receipt in Persian language that his debts of 85 catties had been settled. Pieter van den Hoorn did not believe Hāji Salim's document. In 1690, the Dutch envoy Joan van Leenen went to Persia to settle trade disputes. Joan van Leenen was also to conduct investigation about Hāji Salim's debts. Van Leenen obtained information from VOC officials in Bandar Abbas, Isfahan and sent reports back to Johannes Camphuys at Batavia. Van Leenen's reports found no evidences that Hāji Salim had repaid his debts and suggested that Hāji Salim's document was a forgery.

Camphuys reciprocated Phetracha and Phrakhlang Kosa Pan with letters and presents in 1690. Pieter van den Hoorn, accompanied by German naturalist Engelbert Kaempfer, presented the letters and gifts to the Phrakhlang in June 1690. Persian–Siamese official Okphra Sriyos (Opera Tsijat) led Van den Hoorn and Kaempfer into an audience with Kosa Pan. Kaempfer described Okphra Sriyos as being a Moor from Hindustan (a Persian from India, a.k.a. Indo–Iranian), being the "Head of the Moors", the Syahbandar and wearing gold-embroided gown and turban. Okphra Sriyos declined the alcoholic brandy offered by the Dutch. This Okphra Sriyos was probably Chū Kīā the younger son of Āqā Muḥammad Astarābādī.

After the deaths of King Narai and Phaulkon, the Anglo–Siamese relations were normalized. Elihu Yale the EIC President at Fort St. George or Madras sent a letter in 1690 congratulating Phetracha's ascension and also reminding the Siamese king that Siam had been owing the debt of £65,000, which had stemmed from Hāji Salīm, the Persian envoys and Samuel White's attacks on the ships. Phrakhlang Kosa Pan refused to repay this debt to EIC, saying that this debt was the personal responsibility of Phaulkon and White, not obliging Siam to pay.

Siam under King Narai had maintained trade relations with Golconda Sultanate through the port of Masulipatam on the Coromandel Coast. Mughal Emperor Aurangzeb conquered the Golconda Sultanate in 1687, incorporating the sultanate into Mughal Empire as Hyderabad Subah province. In 1692, Alī Akbar, an Indo–Persian man who had been Narai's trading agent in Masulipatam, which had become part of the Mughal Hyderabad province, borrowed 100 catties of money from the VOC. The Dutch understood that Alī Akbar had been Siam's representative so they sent the bill to the court of Phetracha. However, Phetracha did not recognize Alī Akbar, an official of the previous reign, as having authority and refused to repay Alī Akbar's debts.

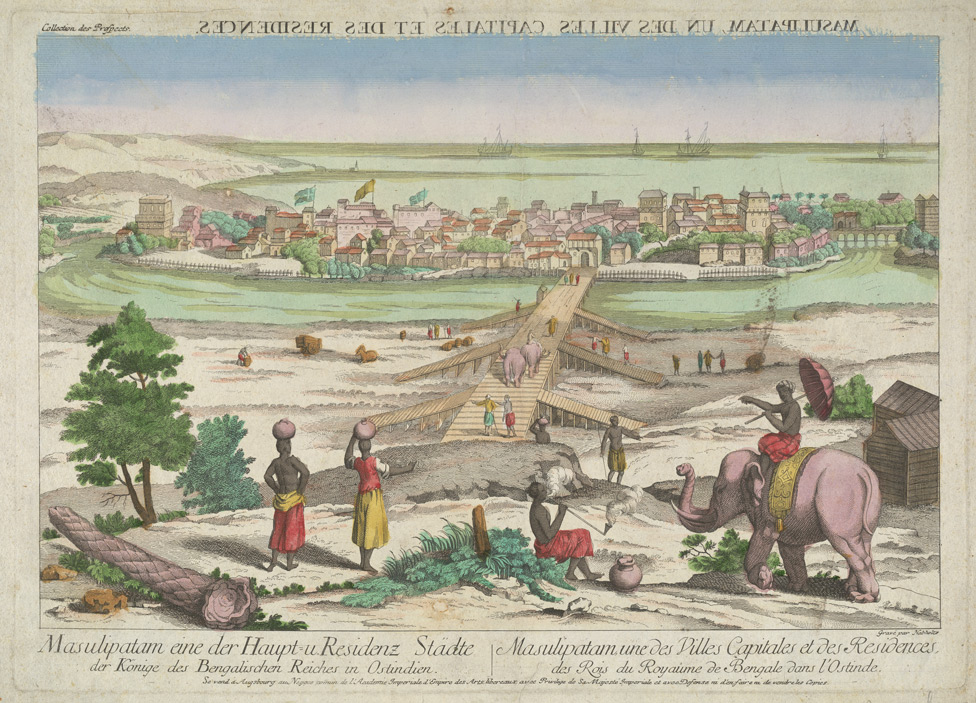
Masulipatam or Machilipatnam, a port city of Golconda Sultanate and then Hyderabad Subah, depicted by Philippus Baldaeus

In 1692, Hāji Salim explained to Phrakhlang that, during his stay in Persia, he sent his merchandise to Bandar Abbas to trade. However, a dispute arose and Hāji Salim petitioned his case to the Grand Vizier Zanganeh (Eʿtemād al-Dowleh) at Isfahan. The Persian court then ruled that Hāji Salim's debt to VOC be offset. The VOC at Isfahan then produced this Persian-language document describing this debt settlement. By 1693, Kosa Pan begin to take Hāji Salim's side. Irritated, the Dutch speculated that Hāji Salim did not have money to repay debts and Phrakhlang Kosa Pan was unwilling to repay Hāji Salim's debts with Siamese Royal Treasury. Batavia under the Governor-General Willem van Outhoorn sent Van Leenen's reports to Ayutthaya in 1693 but Kosa Pan found these evidences insufficient to oblige Siam to pay. Van Outhoorn commanded another investigation in Persia and only obtained a little more evidences.

In 1694, Phetracha sent two commissioners to bring Alī Akbar from Masulipatam to Ayutthaya to settle debts. Fearing that he would be executed upon his return to Siam, Alī Akbar fled to Hyderabad, where he sought assistance from Jan Sipar Khan the Hyderabad Subahdar. Phetracha's two agents followed Alī Akbar to Hyderabad. Jan Sipar Khan ruled that Alī Akbar could not leave Masulipatam until his debts had been settled, thus protecting Alī Akbar. Phrakhlang Kosa Pan sent letters to Jan Sipar Khan, urging the Subahdar to help Siam and not to shelter Alī Akbar. Kosa Pan rejected new evidences from Persia concerning Hāji Salim's debts in May 1695. By 1697, the Dutch gave up and Van Outhoorn decided to write off the debts of Siam's two Muslim officials Alī Akbar (100 catties) and Hāji Salim (85 catties) altogether.

=== Continuing Persian presence in Siam ===
Shah Suleiman I of Persia died in 1694, succeeded by his son Soltan Hoseyn. Siam's trade from Tenasserim across the Bay of Bengal to the Indian Coromandel Coast continued after the reign of King Narai. Phetracha attempted to obtain Indian textile technology to establish Siam's native textile production. In 1694, Phetracha assigned a Persian merchant Mahomet Sadek to send royal goods of Japanese copper coins and Siamese tin from Tenasserim to Masulipatam and Narsarpur, in exchange for Indian dye roots, red yarn and textile samples. This Mahomet Sadek was probably the same person as Muḥammad Ṣādiq, son of the Tenasserim governor (who massacred the English at Mergui in 1687) who had earlier received the Persian envoys in 1685. Siamese court continued to employ Iranians and Indo–Iranians as intermediaries in Siam's westward trade across the Bay of Bengal with India in Kromma Tha Khwa or Right Pier or "Westward Harbor" department.

In 1697, King Phetracha of Siam sent a Muslim official named Okluang Amānat Khān as his representative to the Coromandel Coast, bringing Siamese elephants and tin in exchange for Indian horses and textile. Amānat Khān traded at Dutch Pulicat and Masulipatam. Next year, in 1698, the Mughal commander Zulfiqar Khan Nusrat Jung conquered the Maratha royal seat of Gingee. Amānat Khān presented the Siamese elephants to Zulfiqar Khan, who sent horses to Phetracha in return. Amānat Khān also took a huge loan of nearly 20,000 gold pagodas from VOC in order to invest in goods for Phetracha. Phetracha later repaid this loan in 1700, using his Royal Treasury. Apart from Amānat Khān, Phetracha had Muḥammad Khān Beg in Bengal and Ghulām Alī at Ahmedabad in Gujarat as his trading agents.

Indian chintz in Siamese-style pattern, late 18th century. Indian textiles were highly valued in Siam, who obtained them through Persian and Indo–Persian intermediaries.

Also in 1697, a Dutch sailor Augustin Hart, who had been under Fort St. George EIC employment at Madras, with his ship Santa Rosa, attacked a Siamese merchant ship belonging to Phetracha at Negrais on Burmese coast. Mahomod Zadock (also probably the same person as Muḥammad Ṣādiq), the Ribar or representative of the Siamese king at Madras, obtained a Mughal order commanding the EIC to compensate Siam on this incident. The EIC in Madras held a trial on Augustin Hart and found him guilty in 1699, compelling Hart to pay 2,000 pagodas to Phetracha. However, the Siamese court had been owing the debt of 7,972 pagodas to EIC – the debts of Hāji Salīm and the Persian ambassadors. The EIC then seized this 2,000 pagodas paid by Hart intending for Siam as its own to repay Siam's previous debt.

Phetracha died in 1703, succeeded by his son Sorasak as King Phra Chao Suea. Muḥammad Rabīʿ ibn Muḥammad Ebrāhīm the author of The Ship of Sulaimān became Mīrzā Rabīʿa (Persian: میرزا ربیعه) the Mustawfī-yi khāṣṣa (Persian: مستوفی خاصه) or Comptroller of Royal Treasury under Shah Soltan Hosayn. Mīrzā Rabīʿa was the political rival of the Grand Vizier Mohammad Mo'men Khan Shamlu. Phra Chao Suea died in 1708, succeeded by his son Thaisa. Mīrzā Rabīʿa died in 1712 during his visit to Atabat Shia holy sites in Ottoman Iraq. In 1718, Joseph Collett the EIC President of Fort St. George sent John Powney as his delegate to Siam. John Powney was received by Okya Si Naowarat (Oia Sennarat), a Persian–Siamese official. Alexander Hamilton of the Bombay Marine, who also visited Siam in 1718, met this Oia Sennarat, whom Hamilton described as a Persian immigrating from India to Siam as a child forty years prior, an Indo–Iranian. This Okya Si Naowarat conversed with Hamilton in Hindustani language.

Fall of the Persianate Golconda Sultanate, which had been the main source of Indo–Persian immigrants and Persian culture in Siam, in 1687, stalled further introduction of Persian elements. Fall of Golconda in 1687, fall of Isfahan to the Afghans in 1722 and collapse of Safavid authority in Persia disconnected the Persians in Siam from the rest of the Persian world, becoming an isolated cultural enclave, initiating assimilation of the remaining Persians into mainstream Siamese cultural identity. After Chū Kīā, "Son" the son of Chū Chī was Chula Ratchamontri the Lord of the Right Pier (Kromma Tha Khwa). In the reign of Borommakot (1733–1758), Phraya Phetphichai Chai, a great-grandson of Sheikh Ahmad, converted to Theravada Buddhism in order to join Borommakot's pilgrimage to worship Buddha's Footprint at Saraburi. Chai had two sons; Sen and Chen, who followed different religious paths. Sen was a Buddhist and his descendants would become the Bunnag family, while Chen was a Shia Muslim and his Muslim descendants would become the Ahmadchula family, who would continuously hold the position of Chula Ratchamontri.

Towards the latter half of the eighteenth century, the Persians in Siam had intermarried local people, ceased to speak Persian and fully opted for Thai language. Their only remaining distinct identity was Shia Islam. The Chula Ratchamontri during the last years of Ayutthaya was Chen, the son of Chai who remained a Muslim. When King Alaungpaya of the Burmese Konbaung dynasty attacked Tenasserim in early 1760, Siamese king Ekkathat sent the whole troupe of Persian-descended officials including Phra Chula, Luang Sriyos and Khun Si Worakhan to partake in defense of Tenasserim – the province that had been associated with Persian-dominated Siam's westbound trade. Fall of Ayutthaya to the Burmese in 1767 and the permanent loss of Mergui and Tenasserim to Burma, which ended Siamese trade in the Bay of Bengal, was a great blow to the Persian-descended in Siam, who had been cut from their ethnic roots, were left without purposes and became "indigenized".

Kudi Charoenphat or Masjid ḥusayniyya, a prominent Shia Imambara in Bangkok Yai, Bangkok

Two sons of Chula Ratchamontri Chen; Konkaew and Agayi, led the surviving Thaified Persians to resettle in the new Siamese capital of Thonburi. These indigenized Persians, who used to conduct westbound trade for Siam, became marginalized. Konkaew could only obtain a modest noble title of Luang Si Naowarat. They remained humble and insignificant in the Thonburi Period (1767–1782) until resurrection of Siam's internatinal trade. King Rama I of Chakri dynasty made Konkaew Phraya Chula Ratchamontri 1797, the first Chula Ratchamontri of the Rattanakosin Period. Chula Ratchamontri Konkaew built Kudi Chao Sen Imambara in Bangkok Noi as the center of Shia Islam, where Mourning of Muḥarram rituals continued to be performed. The Persian-descended were consequently called Khaek Chao Sen, with "Chao Sen" being Imam Husayn, reflecting their unique tradition.

Upon death of Konkaew, he was succeeded as Chula Ratchamontri by his younger brother Agayi. On two occasions, in 1814 and 1815, the Shia Muḥarram rituals were performed in the Grand Palace for King Rama II to observe. Shia Muslims made their procession, which included Panja hand and Tābūt coffin of Imam Husayn, across the Chao Phraya River to the royal palace. Konkaew's son-in-law Thuean became Chula Ratchamontri after Agayi. Persian-descended officials in Kromma Tha Khwa, which had also been responsible for trade with Westerners, found their new roles in Siam's commercial and diplomatic engagements with Western powers of the nineteenth century. Both John Crawfurd and Henry Burney met these Persian-descended in their visit to Siam in 1822 and 1826, respectively. Crawfurd called them "Mohammedans of the sect of Ali". However, the British identified these Persian–Siamese officials as Chulias or Tamil Muslims. Malay, not Persian, was the working language in Kromma Tha Khwa as a Persian official served as Malay translator in communications between the British envoys and the Siamese court.

== See also ==
- Iran–Thailand relations
