= George White (merchant) =

- Born: 1648; Bristol
- Died: After 1707
- Occupation: Merchant mariner
- Known for: Co-Founder of Reformed English East India Company

George White (1648 – after 1707) was an English merchant and co-founder of the reformed East India Company.

== Early life ==
White was born in Bristol, England, at the end of English Civil War and was the son of a merchant trader. White gained his Master's Certificate and set sail for India in 1670. As an officer on a ship owned by Mr. Jearsey a prominent figure in the East India Company stationed in Fort St George India. George and his wife took up residence in Fort St George, Madras (now Chennai).

== India ==
When White arrived in the Far East, he was not employed by the East India Company but worked as a coastal trader supplying and transporting goods from as far as the Persian Gulf. This appears to have been acceptable to the company, though he was regarded as an "interloper". The laws of the charter given to the Company provided that any English ships trading between the East of India and England might be seized and fined £1000. However, since White was working on coastal trade, he was not subject to the penalty and developed an acceptable working relationship with the company.

== Siam ==
On White's outward journey east of India, he employed a Greek man named Constantine Phaulkon as his assistant. Phaulkon had left his native country at a young age and had worked on several ships of different nationalities. He was a gifted linguist and very bright. White and Phaulkon worked together in Siam, where Phaulkon rose, in time, to be the first Minister to the Court of King Narai of Siam. White was recommended to the East India Company for his knowledge of the trade in India by Richard Barnaby, the Head of the Company factor (factory) in Madras. The two went on to be good friends and trading partners.

In 1676, whilst White was living in Ayutthaya, the capital of Siam, his wife left their mansion in Fort St. George and joined him there.

In 1681, the Siamese Court ordered the forfeiture of White's house and factor that he administered for the East India Company. The order was made due to non-payment of rent on his house. White had refused to pay as this was not in the original agreement. Barnaby, being worried for White's safety, sent three armed Englishmen to protect him. This astonished White, as he was quite happy and felt that he could handle the situation. The Company paid the debts owed and his stocks were released.

In 1681, the Dutch merchant Van Vliet accused White of lending Phaulkon a considerable amount of money that belonged to the company. The evidence for this was destroyed in the fire which caused the factor to burn down. Barnaby, who had been at the factor a few days before the fire had accused Mr. Potts for his negligence, as Potts had tried to implicate White. Both White and Barnaby left Siam in 1681.

== Return to India ==
White later went into a joint venture with Potts and Barnaby.

It is believed that White had a coloured servant who served Mr. Strangh and Mr. Yale in 1683 on their trip to India. They had been sent from London with letters of authority to investigate the company's affairs in India. They had the power to allow it to continue or order it to cease trading.

== Return to England ==
White returned from India in 1681, sailing in his own ship, the Phoenix. Thomas Povey sent a letter of introduction to Sir Robert Southwell, stating that White had returned from the East as a well-educated man of the world, being truly worthy of his patronage, and regretting the losses to George White and his brother Samuel, which may have been more than £40,000.

== Samuel White ==
George White's younger brother, Samuel "Siamese" White, was a notorious trader in the Far East. With the recommendation of Constantine Phaulkon, Samuel became the administrator of the port of Mergui (now part of Burma). Through Samuel's mishandling and greed, he was responsible, in 1687, for the uprising in Mergui and the subsequent slaughter of 87 Englishmen.

George White and Thomas Povey, who was the brother of Mary Povey the late wife of Samuel White, were appointed Samuel White's attorney and guardian to his two daughters, Mary White (b. 1680, d. 1716) "who married John Wittewronge 1673–1722" and Susan White, (b. 1677), who "married John Gumley 1673–1722". Money was sent home and they were to purchase landed estates on behalf of their wards in case he did not survive or, if he did, he would live the life of a country gentleman. Samuel White died after returning to England on 7 January 1689.

George White and Francis Heath were appointed the executors of Samuel White's will.

In 1689 George White pursued the East India Company over the seizure of £40,000 of Samuel White's assets and answered charges brought by Francis Davenport, who had stated that Samuel White had acted illegally and had seized the company's goods as well as imprisoned their employees. White sent a paper to Parliament answering an earlier paper written by Francis Davenport and the East India Company; this case was settled by the Company out of court.

== Opposition to East India Company ==
Between 1687 and 1691, while living in London, White vigorously opposed the East India Company (at that time governed by Sir Josiah Child), which had enforced a monopoly in the East; White then sent a petition to Parliament on behalf of his brother Samuel White and several members of parliament.

In his book The Company-State: Corporate Sovereignty and the Early Modern Foundations of the British Empire in India, Philip J Stern relates Macaulay's observations that "Sir Josiah Child was likened to every villain imaginable – Oliver Cromwell, Louis XIV, Goliath and Satan", and who was tarred as the "Despot on Leadenhall Street". This shows the depth of feeling against the company. The war with Siam does not seem to be the main factor in the company's charter being withdrawn, but the imposition of martial law and infliction of capital punishment that was enacted in response to the unrest that had broken out in St Helena.

George White became a member of parliament at this time. This enabled him to lobby fellow MPs in aid of his cause.

In 1691, White wrote and published a pamphlet titled "An account of the trade to the East Indies"; this was very well received, translated into Dutch, and was still being reprinted one hundred years later.

George White also wrote that during the period 1675 to 1683 (why he chose this period is not clear) but over these 9 years he had the East India Company shipping out some four and a half million in silver and gold bullion, though he does not differentiate between the amount of company and that privately. It is thought that George White gleaned this information from the company's accounts as he would have had access to them as was his right as a shareholder, a right the East India Company on numerous occasions tried to restrict.

Kirti N. Chaudhuri a historian that had access to the East India Company accounts came to the conclusion that the East India Company had exported in the period set out by George White (1675-1683) the amount of £3,544,750 this leaving some £955,280 being exported privately.

== Final return to India ==
In 1694, Parliament passed a law stating that any Englishman could trade in India or China so long as he has not been barred from doing so by Parliament. George White took full advantage of this and set sail for the East. However, upon arrival, he found that what was law in England was still treason in India. He left his ship and traveled overland to Surat, where he learnt that his ship and cargo had been sold to the company by his principals. To make matters worse, he had to plead that he was a servant of the company to save himself from prison. Shortly after this, he departed from India, never to return.

=== Reformed East India Company ===
In 1698, George White was one of the leading forces behind the setting up of a rival company known as the "English Company Trading to East India", which was initially financed under a state-backed indemnity of £2 million. George White was part of the new company's Court of Directors, which had the responsibility of deciding on the rules for new directors, each new director having to put up the sum of £2000, without interest, as well as being approved by the existing directors. This new company could not compete with the old East India Company as powerful directors of the original company took out shares in the new company, in the sum of £315,000, giving them influence on the new company's board. The new company could only gain a small percentage of the trade carried out and, in 1708, finally merged with the original East India Company, in a tripartite indenture involving both the companies and the state.

The amalgamated Company became known as the "United Company of Merchants of England Trading in India". Under this arrangement, the merged company lent to the Treasury a sum of £3,200,000, in return for exclusive privileges for the next three years, after which the situation was to be reviewed.
