= Constantine Phaulkon =

Greek adventurer (1647–1688)

Chao Phraya Wichayen Constantine Phaulkon
- Κωνσταντῖνος Γεράκης
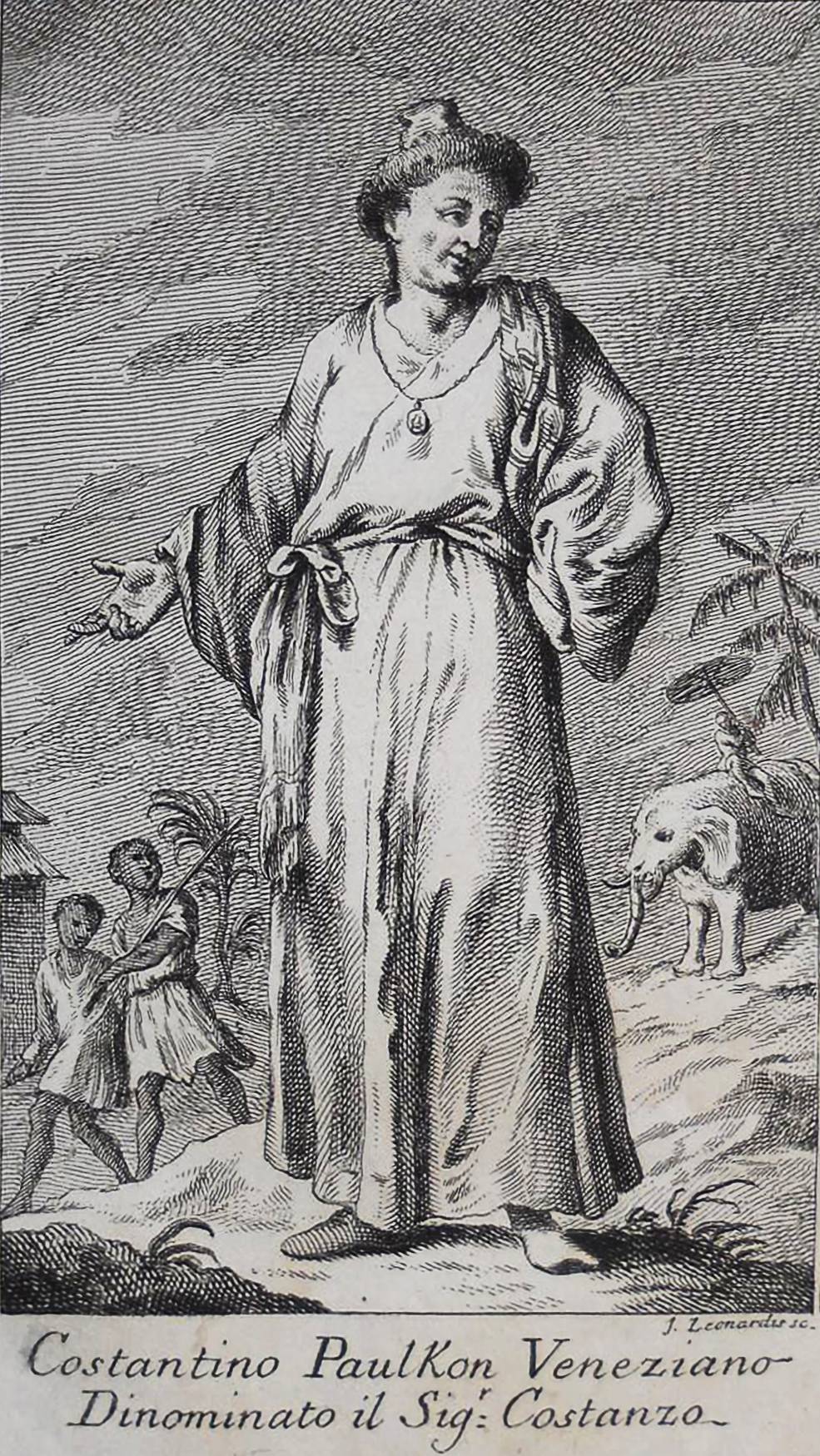
- 17th-century depiction of Constantine Phaulkon

Samuhanayok (chief minister) of the Ayutthaya Kingdom
- In office 1685–1688 Serving with Chao Phraya Chomnan Pakdi (Soombun)
- Monarch: Narai
- Preceded by: Chao Phraya Apairaja (Cheen)
- Succeeded by: Chao Phraya Chomnan Pakdi (Soombun)

Phra Khlang (minister of treasury and taxation)
- In office 1683–1685
- Monarch: Narai

Personal details
- Born: 1647 Erisso, Cephalonia, Republic of Venice
- Died: 5 June 1688 (aged 40–41) Lopburi, Ayutthaya Kingdom
- Cause of death: Decapitation
- Spouse: Maria Guyomar de Pinha (m. 1682)
- Children: 2
- Relatives: Grandparents: Costantin Gerachi and Pagulina Cangelari. Great-grandfather: Captain Marco Cangelari, military commander and ambassador of the Community of Cephalonia to Venice (1561)
- Occupation: Soldier, clerk, trader, translator, nobleman
- Known for: Favourite of King Narai
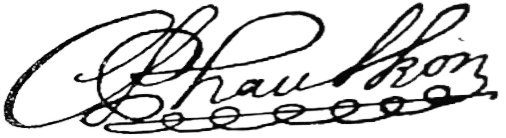
- Signature

Military service
- Allegiance: England (1665–1667); English East India Company (1667–1679); Ayutthaya Kingdom
- Battles/wars: Second Anglo-Dutch War; Third Anglo-Dutch War; Makassar Revolt (1686); Anglo-Siamese War; Siamese revolution of 1688 (executed)

Constantine Phaulkon (Note: Greek: Κωνσταντῖνος Γεράκης, Konstantinos Gerakis; γεράκι is the Greek word for "falcon"; also known as Costantin Gerachi, Capitão Falcão in Portuguese and simply as Monsieur Constance in French) (1647 – 5 June 1688), also Kastan, (Note: Thai: กาศตัน; as noted in a letter from Kosa Pan, to Father de La Chaise (Père François d'Aix de la Chaise); derived from Constans, the name foreigners used for Constantine Phaulkon) was a Greek adventurer who became chief minister to King Narai of the Ayutthaya Kingdom and assumed the Siamese noble title Chao Phraya Wichayen (Thai: เจ้าพระยาวิไชเยนทร์). In this role, he wielded immense influence over Ayutthaya's foreign affairs and trade, playing a crucial part in establishing close diplomatic ties with the court of King Louis XIV of France.

== Origins ==
Constantine Phaulkon was born to Greek parents within Assos Castle in the region of Erisso (pertinenza di Erisso) on northern Cephalonia (then under Venetian rule). His father's name was Zuane (Greek: Τζουγάνης that is John) and his mother's is still unknown. The Gerakis (Γεράκης) / Gerachi family was already established in the village of Plagia (Πλαγιά), since the 16th century.

== Early career ==
At age 13, Phaulkon left Cephalonia on an English ship and spent the next ten years of his life living in London. It was then, that his name “Gerachi” was anglicised into “Falcon”, before its re-Hellenization into “Phaulkon”. He may have served in the Royal Navy and fought under the command of Prince Rupert of the Rhine against the Dutch during the Second Anglo-Dutch War. In 1669, Phaulkon sailed to Bantam on an English ship, the Hopewell as assistant gunner and enlisted as a clerk in the English East India Company.

His time as assistant gunner within the company also coincided with the Third Anglo-Dutch War. He made friends with senior Company official Richard Burnaby and trader George White as well as his younger brother Samuel.

While assistant gunner, Phaulkon came to Siam (present day Thailand), as a merchant in 1675 after working for England's East India Company. Phaulkon became fluent in the Siamese language in just a few years (he was also fluent in English, French, Portuguese, and Malay). In 1679, Burnaby pressed Phaulkon into the service of the Phra Khlang Kosa Lek to help facilitate trade relations. In 1681, Lek introduced him to the court of King Narai and Phaulkon began work as an interpreter, quickly gaining royal favor. Due to his experience with the East India Company, he also worked within the royal treasury.

== Rise to power ==
There are many accounts telling of Phaulkon's rise to power and how his skills gained him the favour of King Narai. One of these skills were supposedly his efficiency in accounting, with which he investigated a claim by Persian traders that the treasury owed them debt. After inspecting the royal accounts, Phaulkon came to the conclusion that it was in actuality the Persian traders that owed the treasury; thus garnering much needed revenue for the royal treasury.

Another account says that King Narai wanted to investigate the weight of a cannon. Phaulkon proceeded to place the cannon in the hold of a boat and then marked where waterline ended up. He then removed the cannon and filled the boat with rice until it reached the same mark.

Thanks to Phaulkon's competence and administrative capabilities, as well as his knowledge of Europe, King Narai came to favour him greatly. In 1682, Phaulkon abandoned Anglicanism for Catholicism and soon after married a Catholic woman of mixed Japanese-Portuguese-Bengali descent named Maria Guyomar de Pinha. They lived a life of affluence as Phaulkon rose to become highly influential at the Siamese court of King Narai. Their marriage brought two sons, George "Jorge" Phaulkon and Constantin "João" Phaulkon.

In 1683, Phaulkon suggested to King Narai to construct the fort of Mergui in the modern polygonal style, which was popular in Europe, which was strongly opposed by Kosa Lek. Lek was later accused of receiving bribes from peasants who did not want to be drafted into the construction of the fort and was later flogged with rattan sticks on the King's orders. Lek died due to the injuries he sustained about a month later in July, and his properties were confiscated. King Narai offered Lek's former position to Phaulkon, which he declined and instead accepted an advisory role to the Malay noble Okya Wang, who had assumed the position.

In 1686, Phaulkon was made a commander in the royal forces during the suppression of the Makassar Revolt. He personally led the troops during the fighting and was almost killed in combat. In the aftermath, Phaulkon oversaw the punishments of rebel prisoners as well as deserters from the royal army.

== French rapprochement ==
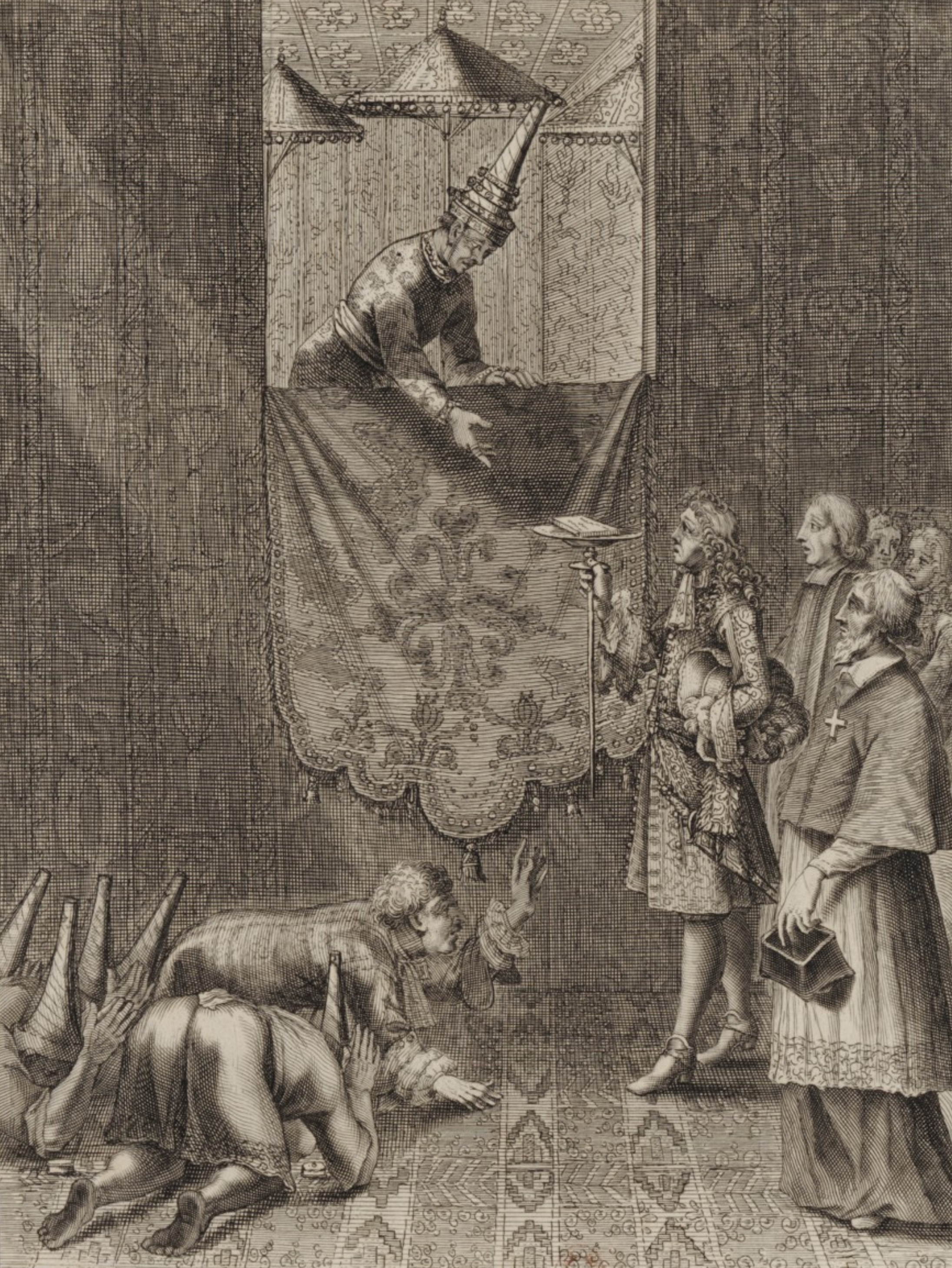
The French ambassador Chevalier de Chaumont presents a letter from Louis XIV to King Narai. Constance Phaulkon is seen kowtowing in the lower left corner of the print, making a gesture telling the ambassador to raise the letter up to the king.

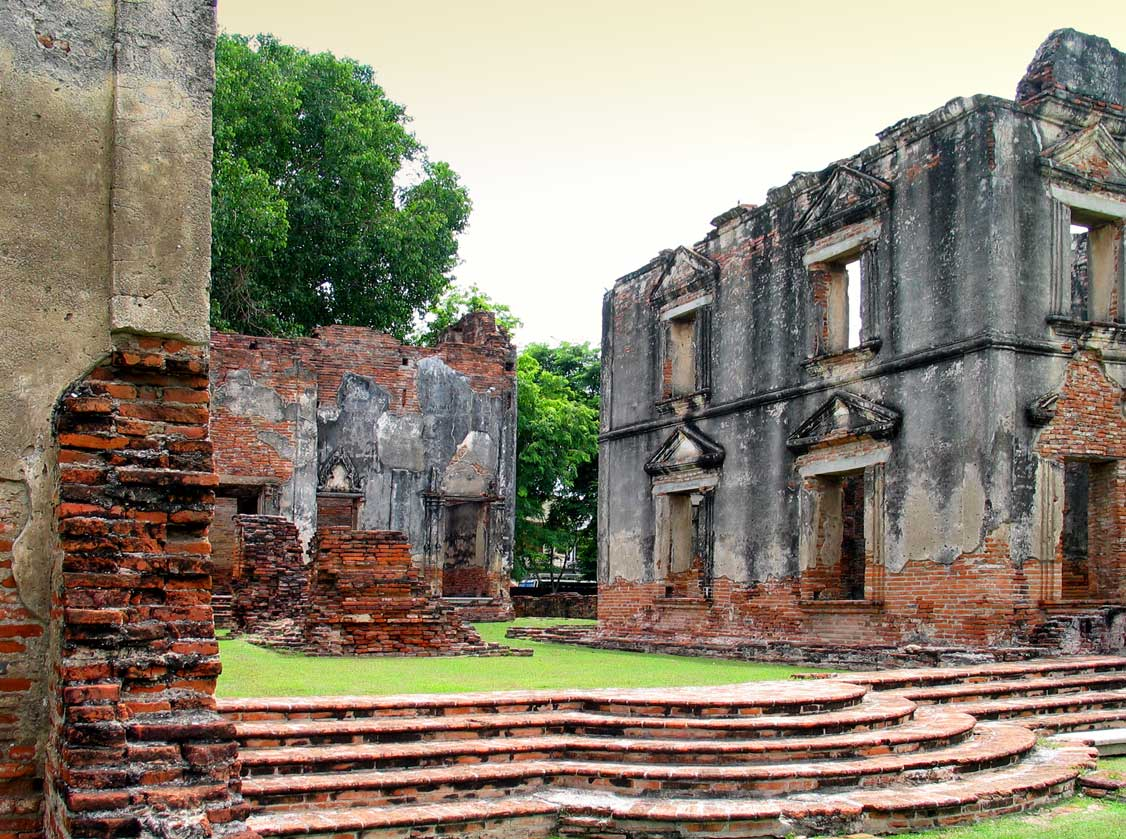
Ban Wichayen (residence of Constantine Phaulkon), Lopburi, Thailand.

Following troubles with the English and the Dutch, Phaulkon engineered a Franco-Siamese rapprochement leading to the exchange of numerous embassies between France and the Ayutthaya Kingdom, as well as the dispatch of an expeditionary force by the French by 1687.

Phaulkon, called Monsieur Constance by the French and addressed cher ami by their king, was their main ally for several years. In recognition King Louis XIV awarded him with the knighthood of the Order of Saint Michael, a hereditary title in the French nobility as well as French citizenship for him and his family. King Narai had hoped to use the French as a counterweight to Dutch influence.

The embassy of Chevalier de Chaumont in 1685 further strengthened ties between the two Kingdoms, Chaumont also being accompanied by Jesuit Guy Tachard and French naval commander Claude de Forbin, who would remain to serve King Narai as Governor of Bangkok, as well as training Siamese troops in European tactics with the Thai title Ok-Phrasaksongkram. Forbin would later become the subject of Phaulkon's bitter jealousy.

During Tachard's presence in Siam, Phaulkon plotted to secure his power and influence; through secret diplomacy with the Jesuit. He drafted a letter requesting Frenchmen to be sent from France, whom he would to use his power to place in political and military offices, as his supporters, and under his patronage. Phaulkon also requested that King Louis XIV send troops and warships to secure the southern port city of Singora, which had been conceded to France by King Narai.

The Greek favourite of King Narai also offered the concession of the port of Mergui, previously held by Phaulkon's English pirates to French control, to which the King eventually consented. Phaulkon became a prime counsellor to the king in 1685 and expressed a desire to designate a Catholic successor to King Narai, most likely, Phra Pi, who was Narai's adopted son and a Catholic convert, as well as scheming to convert the Kingdom to Catholicism, albeit peacefully, by winning over the masses through charity and alms.

Phaulkon wanted a successor who would uphold amiable relations with France and offer privileges to the French, which would guarantee his political standing and security in a court that had grown increasingly hostile to his influence and power. Phaulkon selected Kosa Pan to lead as an ambassador. In response, King Narai proceeded to send the embassy to France. Pan's audience was granted by King Louis XIV at Versailles and the embassy toured the French country.

== Feud with the East India Company ==
As a result of his meteoric rise to power and King Narai's trust in him, Phaulkon's old English colleagues from the East India Company such as Richard Burnaby and Samuel White were given positions of power. A substantial number of Englishmen and women also left the company's jurisdiction, instead pledging fealty to King Narai due to their favoured status and settled in the Ayutthaya Kingdom.

Burnaby was made the governor of Mergui and White became its Harbourmaster. However the two Englishmen entrusted with the port of Mergui had old vendettas against the Kingdom of Golconda due to a past trading dispute, and proceeded to use their newly acquired power to engage in piracy and warfare against Golconda and Indian shipping.

This led to retaliation by the East India Company under President Elihu Yale in 1687, who subsequently sent Anthony Weltden with two warships to punish Burnaby and White, as well as demanding recompense from the Ayutthaya Kingdom. The company was also able to obtain an order from King James II forbidding Englishmen from serving on foreign ships, due to the glut of Englishmen abandoning Company service for preferential treatment in the Ayutthaya Kingdom.

Upon arrival of Weltden's ships, Burnaby and White were cowed into opening the gates and receiving the Company forces, who came ashore. During the negotiations, the local Siamese suspected White and Burnaby of treachery and rallied under the Governor of Tenasserim who led the massacre of many Englishmen and women in Mergui.

Richard Burnaby was slain in the slaughter but Weltden and White escaped with their lives, retreating into the sea. The butchery by the Governor also involved a scene in which innocent Englishmen and women were slain, including an Englishwoman who was tortured and killed with her children for refusing the Governor's advances. When King Narai had heard of the transgressions against innocent English civilians, he had the Governor of Tenasserim summoned to Lopburi and executed, at Phaulkon's behest. War was also declared on the East India Company.

== Character ==
The Abbé de Choisy, who was a member of the first French embassy to Thailand in 1685, wrote about M. Phaulkon's character:

"He was one of those in the world who have the most wit, liberality, magnificence, intrepidity, and was full of great projects, but perhaps he only wanted to have French troops in order to try and make himself king after the death of his master, which he saw as imminent. He was proud, cruel, pitiless, and with inordinate ambition. He supported the Christian religion because it could support him; but I would never have trusted him in things in which his own advancement was not involved."

— Abbé de Choisy, Mémoires pour servir à l'histoire de Louis XIV, 1983:150.

== Downfall and death ==
Phaulkon's closeness to the king earned him the envy of some Thai members of the royal court, which would eventually prove to be his undoing. When King Narai became terminally ill, a rumor spread that Phaulkon wanted to use the designated heir, Phra Pi, as a puppet and actually become ruler himself. This provided credence for Pra Phetracha, the foster brother of Narai to stage a coup d'état, the 1688 Siamese revolution. In Lopburi on 31 March 1688, Phaulkon a discussed plans to put down Phetracha's plot with the French general Marshal Desfarges before the former retreated to the fort in Bangkok, however a month later on 15 April, Desfarges was persuaded by Frenchmen Véret and Abbé de Lionne to abandon plans to go to Lopburi to help Phaulkon and remained in his fort instead.

On 18 May, King Narai, Phra Pi, and their followers were arrested. Phaulkon was summoned to the palace, where he and his 21 men were surrounded by Siamese soldiers and disarmed. He was taken to the palace dungeon where he would be restrained and tortured. Phra Pi was later decapitated on 20 May and his head was thrown at the feet of Phaulkon with the remark, "See, there is your king". On 25 May, Desfarges was summoned to Lopburi by Phetracha and arrived on 2 June. Desfarges said nothing about saving Phaulkon, and Phetracha assumed that the French had abandoned Phaulkon.

On 5 June 1688, Desfarges departed Lopburi, leaving his two sons and a few others there as hostages. Phaulkon was made to hang Phra Pi's head around his neck and Phetracha declared him guilty of high treason. Phaulkon was placed on the silver palanquin mounted on his elephant, and was led out by Phetracha's men to the area of Wat Sak temple in the evening, where Luang Sorasak decapitated and also disemboweled him as witnessed by Father de Bèze. His remains were buried in a shallow grave in front of Wat Sak. However, later that same day, the remains were dug up and eaten by scavenging dogs. When King Narai learned what had happened, he was furious, but was too weak to take any action. Narai died several days later on 11 July 1688, virtually a prisoner in his own palace. Phetracha then proclaimed himself the new king of Siam and began his regime which expelled almost all French troops from the kingdom.

== Legacy ==
The different interpretations of Phetracha's motivation for ordering the arrest and execution of Phaulkon have made his position in Thai history somewhat controversial. Supporters of Phetracha's actions have depicted Phaulkon as an opportunistic Greek foreigner, who sought to use his influence to control of the kingdom on the behalf of Western interests. More skeptical historians have believed that Phaulkon was simply a convenient scapegoat and a means for Phetracha to seize the throne from the rightful heir by capitalizing on the envy and the suspicion that Phaulkon had engendered.

== In popular culture ==
Phaulkon was the central character in the 2013 historical fiction book The Phaulkon Legacy by Walter J Strach III.

Phaulkon was portrayed by the Thai-Scottish actor Louis Scott in the 2018 Thai drama Buppesunniwas and received critical acclaim for his performance. Phaulkon was depicted as a complex character and as cruel, abusive, cunning, and overly-ambitious but also capable of compassion, love, and remorse. Scott won a TVG Award for the best male supporting actor.

Phaulkon has also been portrayed by American-Japanese actor Luke Ishikawa Plowden in the 2026 Thai drama Love Destiny, a boys' love remake of the original 2018 series.
