= Kosa Lek =

Siamese official and trader

Chao Phraya Kosathibodi (Lek)
- เจ้าพระยาโกษาธิบดี (เหล็ก)

Minister of Foreign Affairs and Trade of Ayutthaya
- In office 1679–1683
- Monarch: Narai
- Preceded by: Aqa Muhammed Astarabadi
- Succeeded by: Okya Wang

Personal details
- Born: 1632 Ayutthaya
- Died: 1683 (aged 50–51) Ayutthaya
- Parent: Chao Mae Wat Dusit (mother)
- Relatives: Kosa Pan (brother); Thao Sri Chulalak (sister)

Military service
- Allegiance: Ayutthaya Kingdom
- Years of service: 1660–1672
- Rank: field general
- Battles/wars: Burmese–Siamese War

Chao Phraya Kosathibodi (Thai: เจ้าพระยาโกษาธิบดี; 1632 – July 1683), born Lek (Thai: เหล็ก), commonly known as Kosa Lek (Thai: โกษาเหล็ก), was a prominent Siamese military commander during the reign of King Narai of the Ayutthaya Kingdom. He served as the Phra Khlang (Minister of Trade and Foreign Affairs) and was the elder brother of the renowned diplomat Kosa Pan and the royal consort Thao Sri Chulalak.

== Background ==
Lek was born to a Siamese woman Chao Mae Wat Dusit in the Ayutthaya Kingdom in 1632. Chao was a wet nurse for Phetracha, and also for Prince Narai on the following year, thus making Lek their foster brother. Kosa Lek and his younger brother Kosa Pan were important officials to Narai. When a group of senior lords who helped Narai to succeed to the throne had lost their power a group of young nobles led by Lek and his brother came to help Narai in their place. Lek served as a field general for Narai from 1660 to 1672, and was involved in the Burmese–Siamese War.

Lek became a minister and also a trader, and had a deep trade rivalry with one of the King's favorite Aqa Muhammed Astarabadi of the Persian community until the latter was accused of corruption in 1677 and executed by having his mouth sealed shut in October 1679.

Later Lek put a Greek adventurer and trader Constantine Phaulkon into his service to help facilitating his trading business. Impressed by his talent, Lek introduced him into the court of King Narai in 1681 and Phaulkon began to work as an interpreter. Phaulkon's ability to manage accounting and foreign affairs quickly gained the royal favor of the King.

In 1683, Lek had a disagreement with King Narai over the construction of a European-style fortress as suggested by Phaulkon. Lek was said to have received a bribe of 50 scales (about 4,000 baht in present days) from some certain phrai who did not want it built. King Narai had his men flog Lek with rattan sticks, after which he died from his injuries about a month later.

Although King Narai grieved for Lek's death, this did not stop him from sending his men to confiscate Lek's properties, leaving his family with nothing. King Narai offered Lek's former position to Phaulkon, which he declined and instead accepted the advisory role to the Malay noble Okya Wang, who had assumed the position.
