= Anglo-Siamese War =

Military conflict

Date	1687–1688
Location	Mergui and Coromandel coast
Result	Siam closed to Company traders No peace treaty signed

Belligerents
Ayutthaya Kingdom (Siam) Governorship of Tenasserim and Siamese garrison of Mergui English defectors	East India Company

Commanders and leaders
King Narai; Constantine Phaulkon Governor of Tenasserim (executed); Balat of Tenasserim (executed) Samuel White (defected); Richard Burnaby (defected) †	Elihu Yale; Anthony Weltden

Strength
Shore batteries and Siamese troops from Tenasserim and Mergui	2 warships (Curtana and James), East India Company troops

Casualties and losses
Light	James sunk 60 traders killed Many English civilians killed.

The Anglo-Siamese War (or Anglo-Thai War) was a brief state of war that existed between the English East India Company and the Kingdom of Siam in 1687–88. Siam officially declared war against the Company in August 1687. No peace treaty was ever signed to end the war, but the Siamese revolution of 1688 rendered the issue moot.

The war resulted in part from the jostling of the great powers—England, the United Provinces and France—for trading influence in Siam. The immediate casus belli was the dispute between Siam and the Company over the actions of the Siamese officials at Mergui (Myeik), which the English considered piracy, and the English response, which included a naval blockade of Mergui. With the exception of the fighting at Mergui on 14 June 1687—which amounted to a massacre of English sailors on shore by the Siamese—the actual war was confined to commerce raiding.

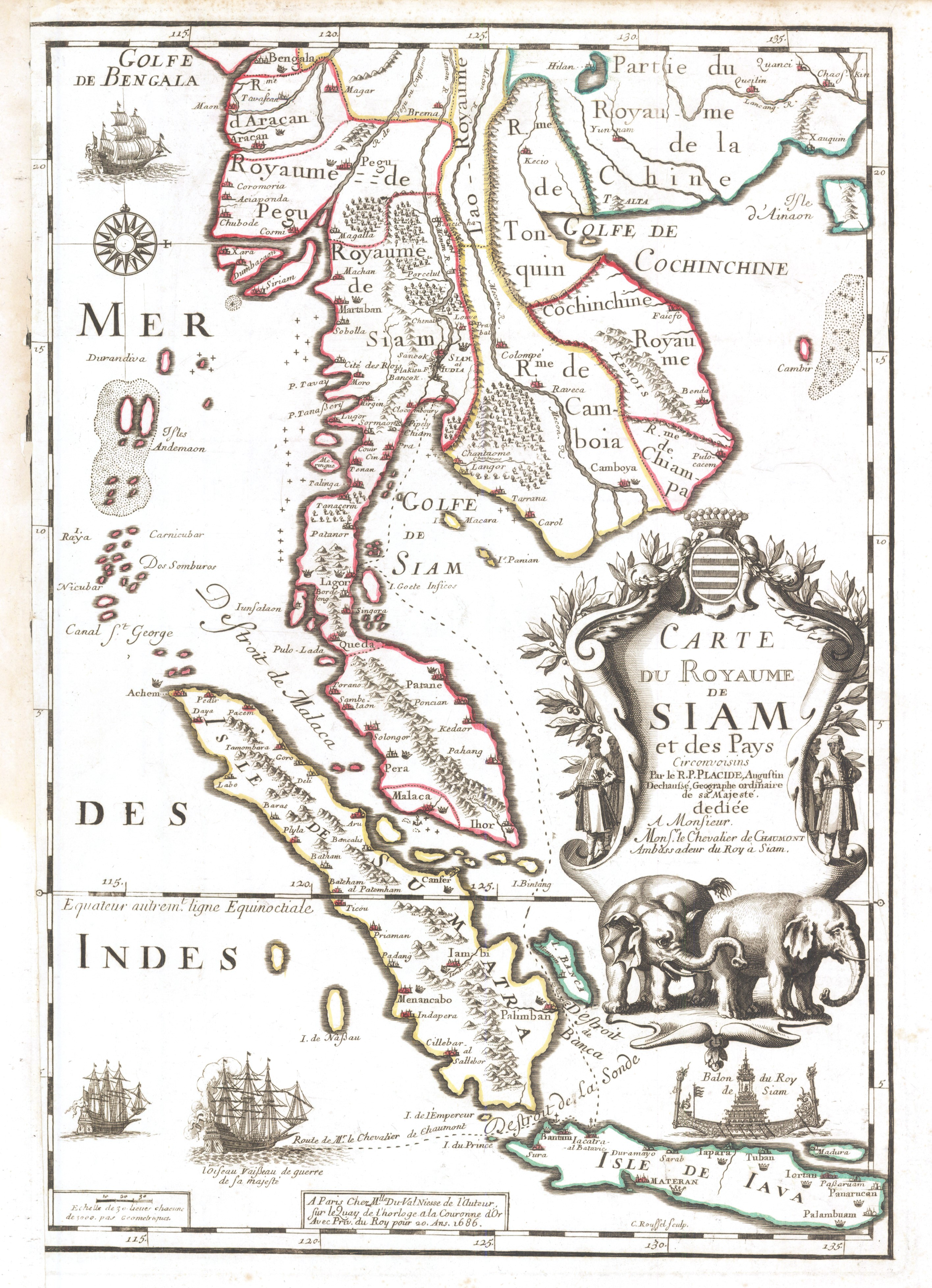
1686 map of Siam. Mergui is labelled Mirgin.

== Background ==
=== Siamese policy under Phaulkon ===
By 1681, Siamese foreign policy was in the hands of King Narai's Greek favourite, Constantine Phaulkon. One of Phaulkon's policies was to develop Siamese trade through the port of Mergui on the Bay of Bengal. This was the main Siamese port engaged in trade with the Coromandel Coast of India. This trade was traditionally conducted by Muslims from the Indian Kingdom of Golconda.

To displace the Indian influence, Phaulkon began constructing ships at Mergui. He manned them with English recruits and they sailed under the Siamese flag. The use of English sailors by Siam provoked conflict between the merchants of Golconda, used to dominating the trade of Mergui, and the East India Company, which possessed the Madras Presidency on the Coromandel Coast.

In 1681, the port official at Masulipatam, a port of Golconda, refused to supply cables to Samuel White, an English associate of Phaulkon's, and as a result White's ship foundered. In 1683, Phaulkon appointed another Englishman, Richard Burnaby, as governor of Mergui with White acting as shahbandar (harbourmaster) under him. Together they supervised a large ship-building programme. White, however, seems from the beginning to have used his position to avenge his grievance against Golconda. Burnaby, like Phaulkon, was a former Company employee. Another former Company employee, Thomas Ivatt, was appointed Siamese ambassador to Golconda.

=== War of reprisals against Golconda ===
In 1685, Burnaby and White began a series of reprisals against Indian shipping, Golconda in particular. Although Phaulkon ordered him to stop, White came up with various excuses to justify continuing his vendetta against Golconda. These were regarded as mere piracy by the Indians and the East India Company, who blamed Phaulkon and the Siamese government for the acts of their subordinates in Mergui. Golconda also blamed the Company for White's actions since he was an Englishman.

Company documents record White's various actions during his vendetta, including a naval bombardment of Masulipatam, the capture of several merchant vessels and the imprisonment of the crew of the Tiaga Raja, an Indian merchant vessel from Madras from which White seized £2,000 worth of goods during its stay in Mergui. He then seized the ship of the Armenian merchant John Demarcora, a resident of Madras.

=== Siamese–Company rift ===
The rift between the Siamese government and the Company was further aggravated by a personal dispute between Phaulkon and the President of Madras, Elihu Yale. Yale had been contracted by Phaulkon to provide some jewellery to King Narai. Phaulkon, however, considering Yale's bill outrageous, refused to receive the jewels when Yale's brother, Thomas, arrived in Ayutthaya. This embarrassment for the Company took place at the same time as the French Chaumont embassy was present (October 1685).

In July 1686, the Company was able to secure from King James II of England an order-in-council forbidding English subjects from serving aboard foreign ships in eastern waters. It did not arrive in Madras until January 1687. In November 1686, Phaulkon wrote to Père François de la Chaise, the confessor of Louis XIV of France, offering to hand over Mergui to the French in order to put an end to White's continued unauthorised piracy.

== Open conflict ==
=== Blockade of Mergui and massacre of the English ===
By late 1686, the East India Company was already prosecuting a war specifically against Samuel White's vendetta. An expedition was dispatched from Madras in October 1686 to seize Negrais up the coast from Mergui to use as a base for combatting piracy. It left after the monsoon had changed and was forced to turn back. The campaign against Mergui got off to an inglorious start.

When the royal proclamation arrived in Madras in January 1687, it was decided to send the warships Curtana and James under the command of Anthony Weltden in order to collect the Englishmen at Mergui and take them out of the King of Siam's service. It was also decided that all ships at Mergui would be impounded in the port until King Narai paid £65,000 in damages for White's piracy.

Curtana and James arrived at Mergui in June 1687. All the Englishmen present, including White, expressed their intention to comply with the king's order. Although Weltden was under orders to blockade the port until October, when the change of monsoon would allow for his return, he immediately let down his guard. On the night of 14 June, while the English were being entertained on shore, the Siamese, under the leadership of the Governor of Tenasserim fired on the moored ships and the Siamese troops massacred the English. James was sunk. Weltden and White were among the few to escape the massacre. Reaching their ships Curtana and Resolution, they sailed them into the Mergui Archipelago to await the monsoon.

=== Siamese reaction ===
In response to Weltden's actions, Siam published an official declaration of war against the East India Company in August 1687. In the aftermath of the massacre, an English woman and her family were murdered by a Siamese balat of Mergui, upon refusing his advances. Upon hearing of this transgression, King Narai had the balat executed to demonstrate justice in defence of innocent English immigrants unaffiliated with the East India Company. The Governor of Tenasserim was likewise executed for the massacre.

While preparations were underway for the blockade of Mergui, the Loubère–Céberet embassy with a military component under Marshal Des Farges left France in March 1687 in order to take up Phaulkon's offer to occupy the port of Mergui and the city of Bangkok. The size of the French embassy and its intentions sparked fears of a Dutch declaration of war on Siam, but these came to nothing. The Dutch East India Company preferred to await the inevitable anti-foreign reaction to such a large French presence so near the capital (Bangkok was only 40 miles (64 km) from Ayutthaya).

Unlike the Dutch, the East India Company, on learning of the departure of the French embassy, pressed James II to intervene to prevent the French acquisition of Mergui. The king sent instructions to Madras ordering the Company to seize the port. When these instructions arrived in August, Yale dispatched a frigate to reinforce Weltden and instruct him to occupy the city, unaware that Weltden had been chased from Mergui months earlier, that Siam had declared war on the Company or that a French governor, the Sieur du Bruant, had already arrived in Mergui. The frigate sailed into the port on 22 September and was promptly captured. Since the frigate had been in pursuit of a Siamese pirate vessel captained by an Englishman just before it reached Mergui, the royal proclamation of July 1686 had evidently been ignored after the Siamese attack on Weltden's force.

In October 1687, Weltden was finally able to return to Madras while White in the Resolution, with Weltden's permission, returned to England.

== Results ==
The brief Anglo-Siamese war, which saw very little fighting, "died a natural death". No peace treaty was ever signed because the Company refused to drop its claim against the Siamese monarchy for £65,000 in damages. As a result of the war, the ports of Siam were closed to Company vessels until 1708, although the Company had resumed trade using foreign-flagged vessels as early as 1705.

White returned to England in 1688. His private secretary, Francis Davenport, was taken prisoner in Mergui. He wrote a pamphlet accusing White of piracy and corruption. White died in 1689 before he could be brought to trial.

== See also ==
- Thailand–United Kingdom relations
- First Anglo-Burmese War
- Bowring Treaty
- Anglo-Siamese Treaty of 1909
