= French ship Forbin =

Six ships of the French Navy have been named Forbin in honour of the 17th century admiral Claude Forbin-Gardanne:

- A first-class propeller aviso (1859–1884)
- French cruiser Forbin, a second-class cruiser (1885–1921)
- An auxiliary patrol boat of the Free French Forces (1944). Originally a cargo ship, she was captured by the British in Gibraltar and requisitioned. She was eventually scuttled in Arromanches to be used as an artificial harbour on the 9 June 1944, in the context of the Invasion of Normandy.
- French destroyer Forbin (1928), a L'Adroit-class destroyer (1928–1952)
- French destroyer Forbin (D635), a T 53-class destroyer, (1955–1992)
- French frigate Forbin, a Horizon-class frigate commissioned in 2008

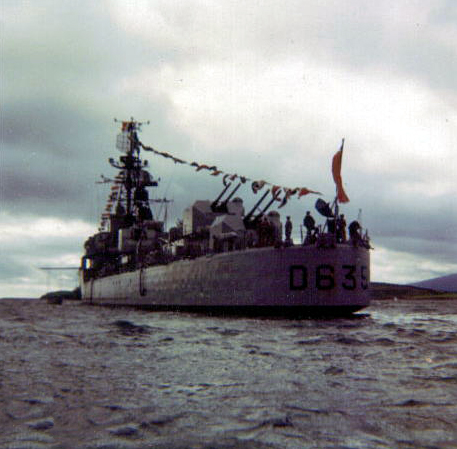
Forbin, the T 53-class destroyer visiting Bantry Bay, Ireland
