= 1686 Makassar revolt =

1686 uprising in Ayutthaya kingdom

Makassar revolt
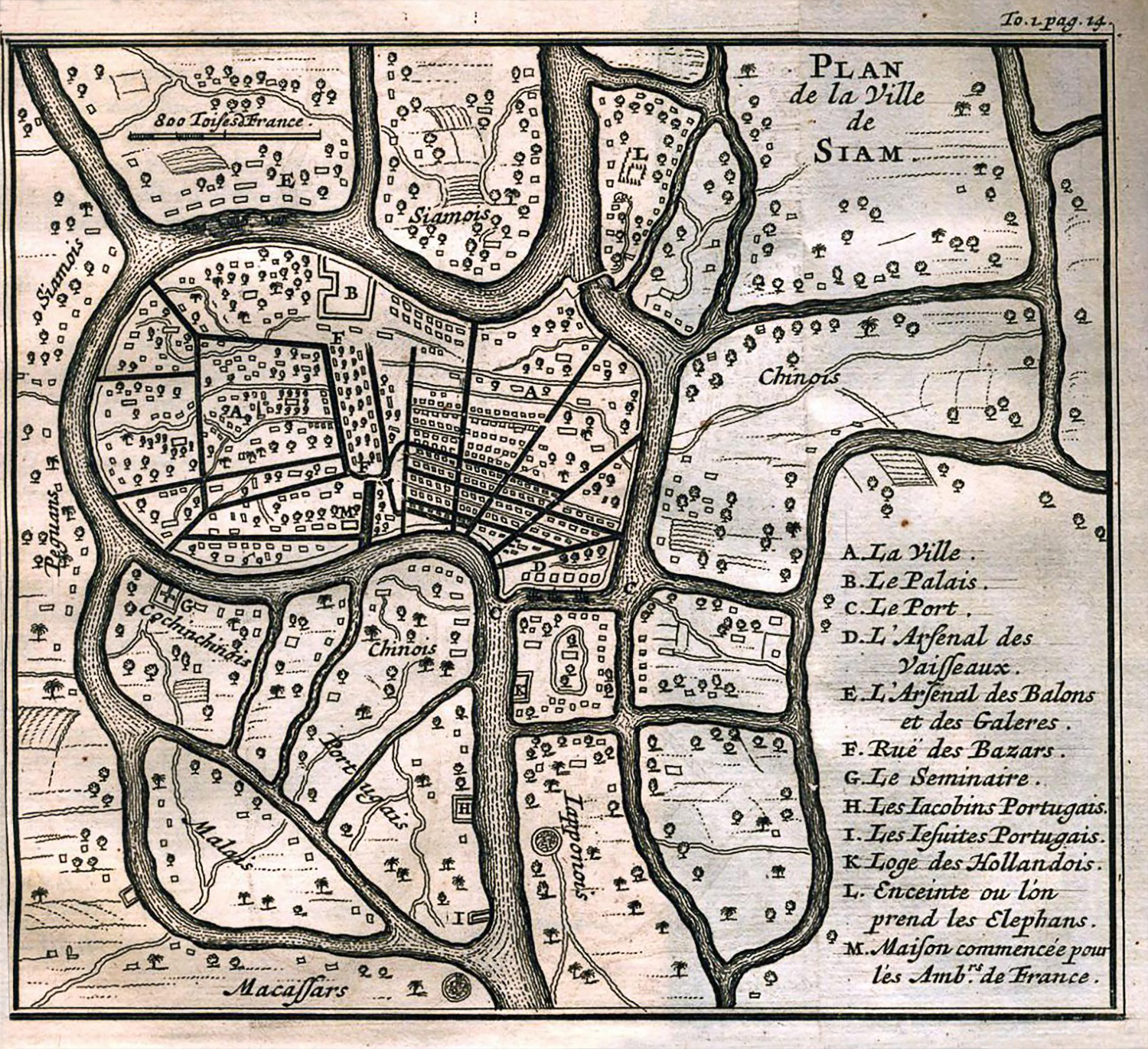
- 1691 map of Ayutthaya by Simon de la Loubère. The Makassar camp is shown on the bottom left with the caption "Macaʃʃars"
Date	15 August – 24 September 1686
Location	Bangkok and Ayutthaya
Result	Ayutthaya–allied victory

Belligerents
Ayutthaya Kingdom; England; France	Makassar rebels

Commanders and leaders
King Narai; Phaulkon; Ok-luang Mahamontri †; Claude de Forbin (Kingdom of England) John Coates † (Kingdom of England) Henry Udall † (Kingdom of France) Vèret	Daeng Mangalle †

Strength
Bangkok: 400 Siamese and European musketeers and pikemen Ayutthaya: 8,000–20,000 Siamese; 40–60 Europeans; 1 English ship (The Herbert)> 60 barges 22 Galleys	Bangkok: 50 Makassar fighters 1 galley Ayutthaya: 100–200 Makassar fighters

Casualties and losses
Bangkok: 366 Siamese and Europeans killed Ayutthaya: 17 Europeans killed	Bangkok: 17 Makassars killed Galley captured Ayutthaya: All Makassarese rebels were killed or captured

The Makassar revolt (Thai: กบฏมักกะสัน RTGS: kabot makkasan) of 1686 was an uprising of Makassar residents in Ayutthaya involving a Makassar prince named Daeng Mangalle. (Note: Spelled Daén ma-Allé in Gervaise's account.) It was the only uprising recorded in the city of Ayutthaya during the reign of King Narai.

== Accounts ==
Accounts of the revolt have not been found in Thai (Note: It is presumed that Thai records of the event was destroyed when Ayutthaya was burned down during the Burmese–Siamese War (1765–1767).) or Makassar sources thus far. Instead, information came from accounts by Europeans, mostly French and English agents with links to Siam at the time, such as Francis Davenport, Claude de Forbin, Nicolas Gervaise, La Mare, François Martin, and Samuel White. (Note: The account by La Mare, an engineer who arrived in Siam with the Chaumont-Choisy embassy in 1685, is perhaps the most extensive and accurate according to Smithies. It is found in Livre III (pp.96-128) of Guy Tachard's 1689 book Second Voyage du Père Tachard et des Jésuites envoyez par le Roy au Royaume de Siam.) While containing basic facts of the revolt, details are often contradictory between accounts.

== Preceding political contexts ==
In the late 17th century, Ayutthaya was a cosmopolitan city with a number of foreign quarters, known as camps, including the Portuguese, Malay, and Cochin-Chinese, with the Makassar camp located near the Malay camp. The presence of Makassar people in Siam was related to the loss suffered by the Makassarese Sultanate of Gowa in south Sulawesi during the Makassar War. In the aftermath of this war, in which the coalition of Dutch East India Company and Sultanate of Bone emerged as victors, many Makassarese nobles, soldiers, and common folk emigrated from Makassar to seek their fortune elsewhere. According to the accounts of Nicolas Gervaise, it was a Makassar prince by the name of Daeng Mangalle (Note: While contemporary European sources often identify him as the son of the Makassar king, this is erroneous. Nevertheless, he did came from a prestigious princely family with relations to Sultan Hasanuddin, and recognized as such by both his cousins in Sulawesi and the King of Siam.) who came to settle in Ayutthaya Kingdom by invitation of the king of Siam. The prince brought around 60 families, composed of 200 people, with him and arrived in Siam in 1664. They were well received and granted with a tract of land which would become the Makassar camp.

Sometime after the establishment of the Makassar camp, the Makassar prince, goaded by a prince of Champa and supported by some Malays, plotted to overthrow King Narai. The motive behind this plot is unclear, with European accounts only offering speculations such as to install a ruler that will cater to the interests of Muslim factions in the region. Narai's court maintained relations with multiple foreign powers, each of which competed for political favor with the king. Despite the Makassar prince receiving generous treatment along with other Muslim factions in Ayutthaya (which include the Chams, Malays, and others), their influence had declined and far eclipsed by Europeans at the time, which may provide an impetus to stage the plot.

== Events ==
The initial plan of the conspirators was to plunder the royal palace of Ayutthaya while the King was staying at his Lopburi palace. However, the plot was uncovered when another Champa prince, a palace officer and brother to one of the conspirators, refused to participate in their upheaval and instead informed Narai's Greek minister Constantine Phaulkon, who alerted the king of the plot in August 1686. As the plot began to unravel, the Malays backed out and distanced themselves from the Makassarese. King Narai took the precautionary measure of increasing security around Ayutthaya and the plunder did not occur. Narai then summoned the Makassar prince, allowing the prince a chance to account for himself and resolving the matter peacefully. But the prince refused to make an appearance and entrenched himself in the Makassar camp with his followers. La Mare's account noted that intermediaries were sent to the Makassar camp multiple times to negotiate with the prince, but the prince kept making excuses to avoid Narai's summons and at one point feigned illness. Narai, who was initially lenient, became increasingly angered with the prince's apparent insolence. At around the same time, a Makassarese galley sailing away from Ayutthaya was stopped at Bangkok by Siamese authorities overseen by Claude de Forbin. The crew was suspected to be implicated with the plot and they were uncooperative with the inspecting authorities. A bloody fight ensued where both Makassarese and Siamese suffered casualties.

After negotiation attempts failed, the Siamese force with English and French allies staged an assault on the Makassar camp of Ayutthaya. The Makassarese managed to kill several commanders during the assault, including Ok-luang Mahamontri from the Siamese force and John Coates along with Henry Udall from the English force, but they were outnumbered and completely surrounded. On 24th September 1686, with Phaulkon present on the battlefield, the Makassar prince was killed. Accounts disagree on who dealt the killing blow. (Note: La Mare wrote that a Frenchman shot the prince dead, Samuel White wrote that the prince was killed by the head of Phaulkon's lifeguard. Other accounts did not identify the prince's killer.) Eventually all remaining Makassarese combatants were killed or taken prisoner. Phaulkon proceeded to King Narai with reports of the combat, and the king was satisfied with the conclusion.

== Aftermath ==
Several accounts noted that Daeng Mangalle left behind two sons, Daeng Ruru and Daeng Tulolo, who were taken into custody shortly after their father was killed in action. They were sent to France, enrolled in Lycée Louis-le-Grand, and later baptized under the name Louis-Pierre Daén Rourou de Macassar and Louis-Dauphin Daén Toulolo de Macassar. Many of the remaining Makassarese in Ayutthaya fled south to Bangkok, and settled near a French fort which gave them protection. Later during the reign of King Chulalongkorn, South Sulawesi Muslims who fled the Dutch military expeditions of 1905 were permitted to settle in the area. The area is still known today as มักกะสัน Makkasan (Thai-fied form of "Makassar"), a khwaeng (sub-district) within the Ratchathewi district of Bangkok. Some elders of Makkasan today claim to be descendants of both the 17th century Makassar immigrants and later 1905 immigrants.
