= Forbin =

Forbin is a French surname.

Members of an ancient Provence family (which now has many branches, the principal ones being the Forbin des Lasarts branch and the Forbin Janson branch) bearing the name include:

- Palamède de Forbin (died 1508), founder of the house
- Toussaint de Forbin-Janson (1625–1713), called the cardinal de Janson, bishop
- Claude de Forbin (1656-1733), French naval commander
- Count de Forbin, officer of the French Navy who served under Suffren during the War of American Independence
- Jacques II de Forbin-Janson (1680–1741), Archbishop of Arles
- Joseph de Forbin (died 1728)
- Louis Nicolas Philippe Auguste de Forbin (1779–1841), French painter
- Charles-Auguste-Marie-Joseph de Forbin-Janson (1785–1844), Bishop of Nancy

Others with this surname include:

- Alfred Forbin (1872-1956), stamp dealer
- Raina Forbin, Haitian politician
- The fictional character Charles A. Forbin in the film Colossus: The Forbin Project

Location:

- Hôtel de Forbin, a hôtel particulier on the Cours Mirabeau in Aix-en-Provence.
