= Narai =

King of Ayutthaya from 1656 to 1688

Narai the Great นารายณ์มหาราช
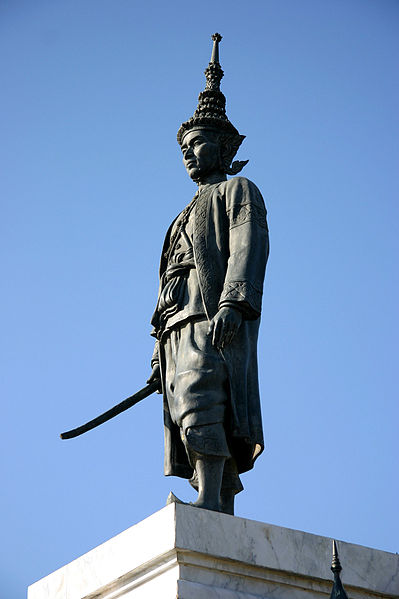
- Statue of Narai the Great, created in 1966, near Lopburi provincial hall

King of Ayutthaya
- Reign: 26 October 1656 – 10/11 July 1688
- Predecessor: Si Suthammaracha
- Successor: Phetracha
- Born: 16 February 1632
- Died: 10/11 July 1688 (aged 56)
- Consort: Kasattri
- Issue: Sudawadi
- Dynasty: Prasat Thong
- Father: Prasat Thong
- Mother: Sirithida

King Narai the Great (Thai: สมเด็จพระนารายณ์มหาราช, RTGS: Somdet Phra Narai Maharat, pronounced [sǒm.dèt pʰráʔ nāː.rāːj mā.hǎː.râːt]), or Ramathibodi III (Thai: รามาธิบดีที่ ๓), was the 27th monarch of Ayutthaya Kingdom, the 4th and last monarch of the Prasat Thong dynasty. He was the king of Ayutthaya Kingdom from 1656 to 1688 and arguably the most famous king of the Prasat Thong dynasty.

His reign was the most prosperous during the Ayutthaya period and saw the great commercial and diplomatic activities with foreign nations including the Middle East and the West. During the later years of his reign, Narai gave his favorite – the Greek adventurer Constantine Phaulkon – so much power that Phaulkon technically became the chancellor of the state. Through the arrangements of Phaulkon, the Siamese kingdom came into close diplomatic relations with the court of Louis XIV and French soldiers and missionaries filled the Siamese aristocracy and defense. The dominance of French officials led to frictions between them and the native mandarins and led to the turbulent revolution of 1688 towards the end of his reign.

Narai's reign was also known for the 1662–1664 invasion of Burma, the destruction of the briefly independent port city of the Sultanate of Singgora (1605–1680), and the conflict he had with the English East India Company.

The presence of numerous foreigners from the French Jesuits to the Persian delegates has left historians with rich sources of material on the city of Ayutthaya and its conflicts and courtly life in the seventeenth century that otherwise would not have survived the complete destruction of the capital in 1767.

== Birth and name ==
Prince Narai was born on 16 February 1632 to King Prasat Thong and his consort, Princess Sirithida (Thai: ศิริธิดา), who was a daughter of Songtham. Prasat Thong had just usurped the throne from the ruling Ayutthaya dynasty in 1629 and founded a dynasty of his own. Narai had an siblings younger sister Princess Si Suphan (or Princess Ratcha Kanlayani), elder half-brother Prince Chai, and an uncle Prince Si Suthammaracha.

The Royal Chronicle of Ayutthaya: Royal Recension Version recorded that "In that year [1633], the princess consort gave birth to a son. When the royal family glanced at the infant, they saw the baby had four arms before having two arms as normal. Upon learning this, the king thought it was a miracle. He therefore named his son Narai." The name Narai is from Sanskrit Narayana, a name of Hindu god Vishnu who has four arms.

== Succession ==
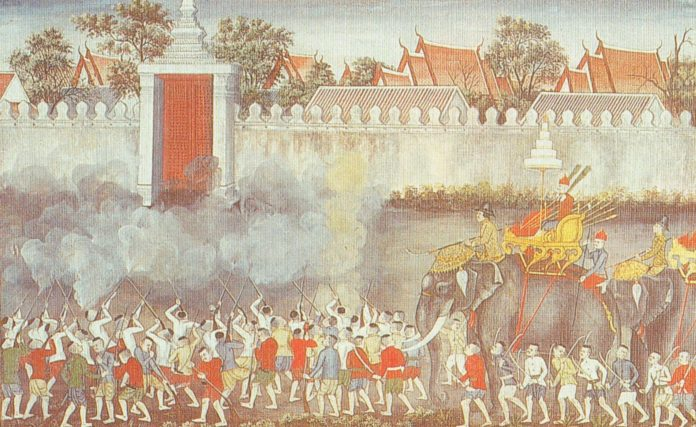
Prince Narai’s coup d’état against his uncle, King Si Suthammaracha. Painting by Nai Im, commissioned by King Chulalongkorn in 1887.

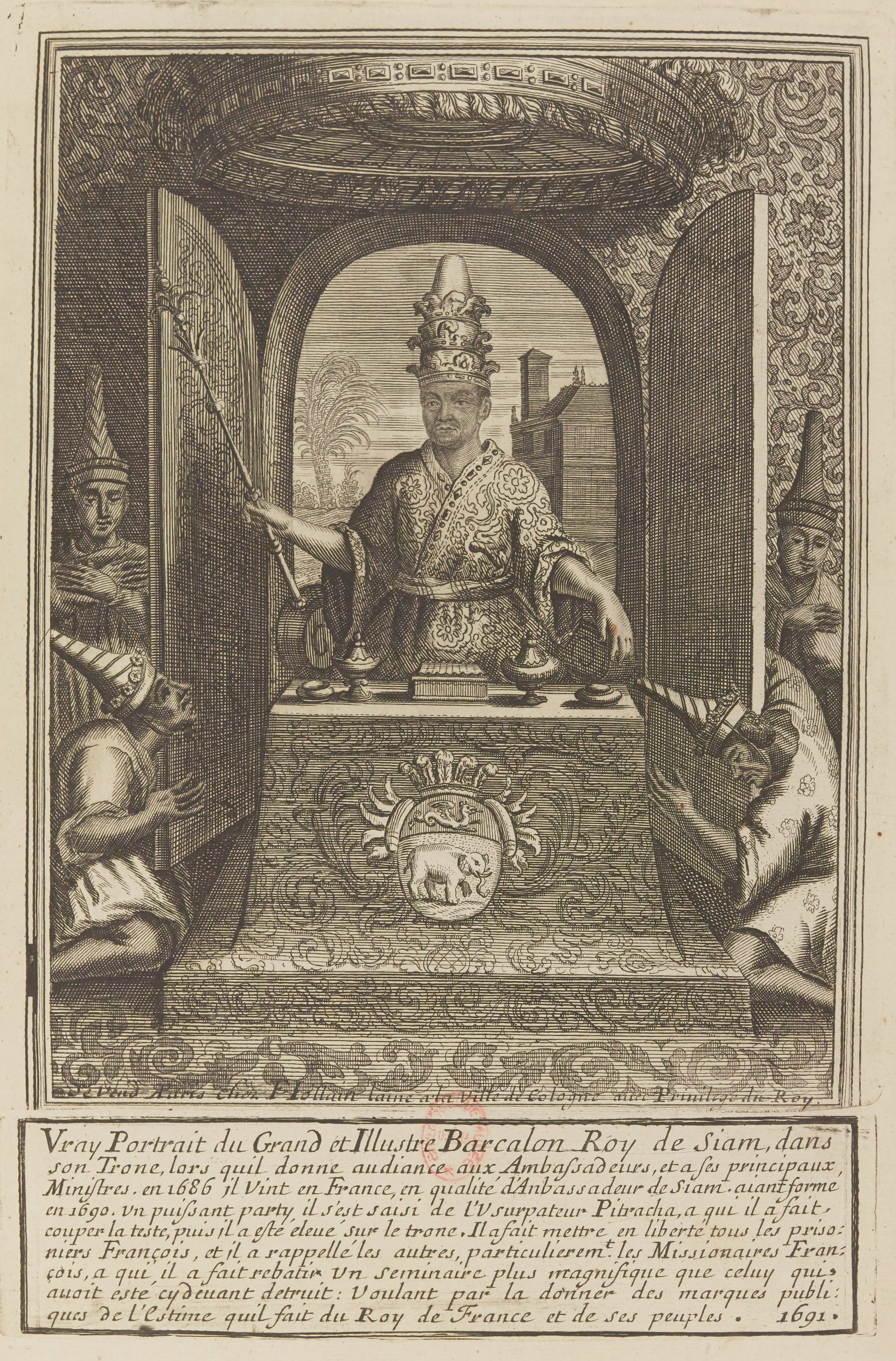
King Narai of Siam on the throne (portrait, c. 1686).

After Prasat Thong’s death in 1656, Prince Chai succeeded him as King Sanphet VI. However, it was a Thai tradition to give brothers a higher priority over sons in succession. Prince Sudharmmaraja plotted with his nephew, Prince Narai, to bring Sanpet VI down. After nine months of ascension, Sanpet VI was executed following a coup. Narai and his uncle marched into the palace, and Si Suthammaracha crowned himself king. Si Suthammaracha appointed Narai as the Uparaja, or Viceroy of the Front Palace. However, Narai was also an ambitious prince and had requested Dutch support against his uncle. Si Suthammaracha's rule was weak and he fell under the control of Chao Phraya Chakri, an ambitious mandarin who also wanted the throne.

In 1656, Narai and his uncle finally alienated each other. Si Suthammaracha lusted after Narai's sister, Princess Ratcha Kanlayani. He ordered his soldiers to surround her residence and entered the house. The princess hid in a book chest and it was smuggled into the Front Palace, where she reunited with her brother.

Enraged at his uncle's behavior, Narai decided to take action. He drew his support from the Persian and Japanese mercenaries that had been persecuted during his father's reign. He was also supported by the Dutch East India Company, as well as his brothers and the Okya Sukhothai, a powerful nobleman. On the Day of Ashura, the Persians, Japanese and Dutch stormed the palace. The prince engaged in single combat with his uncle, until the king fled to the Rear Palace. Si Suthammaracha was captured and was executed at Wat Khok Phraya on 26 October 1656.

== Domestic policy ==
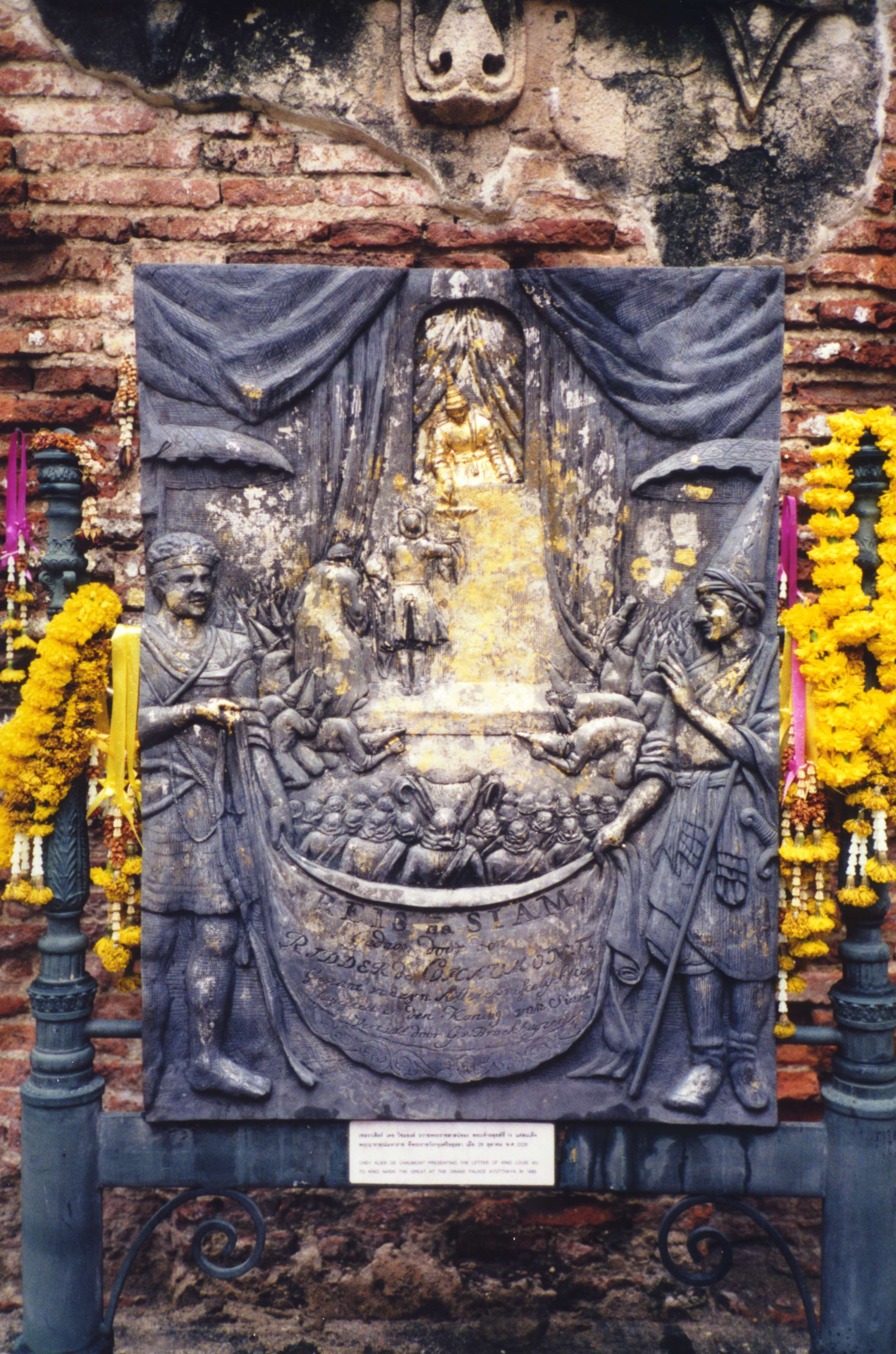
Memorial plate in Lopburi depicting King Narai with French ambassadors.

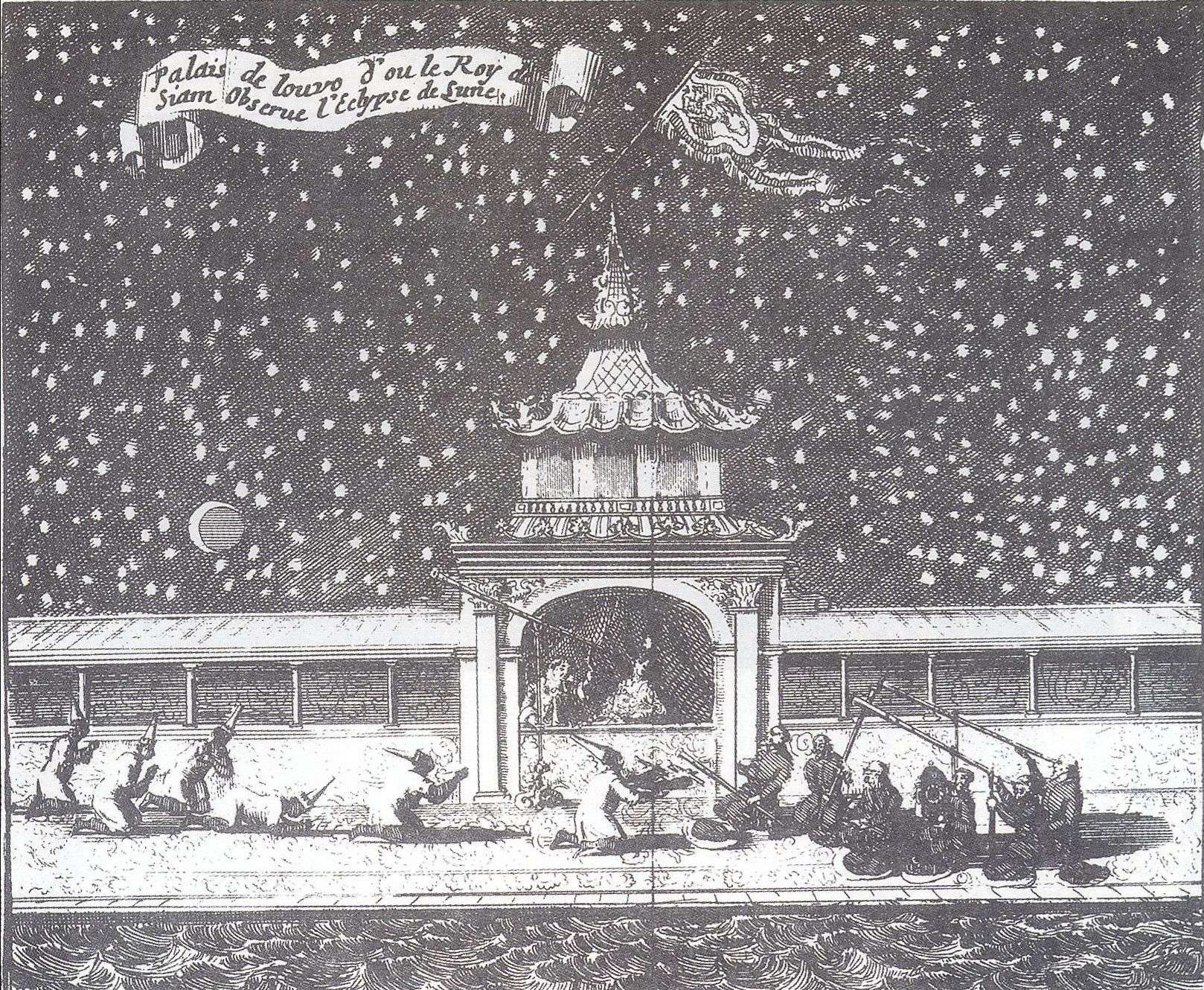
King Narai observing a lunar eclipse with French Jesuits in Lopburi, 1685.

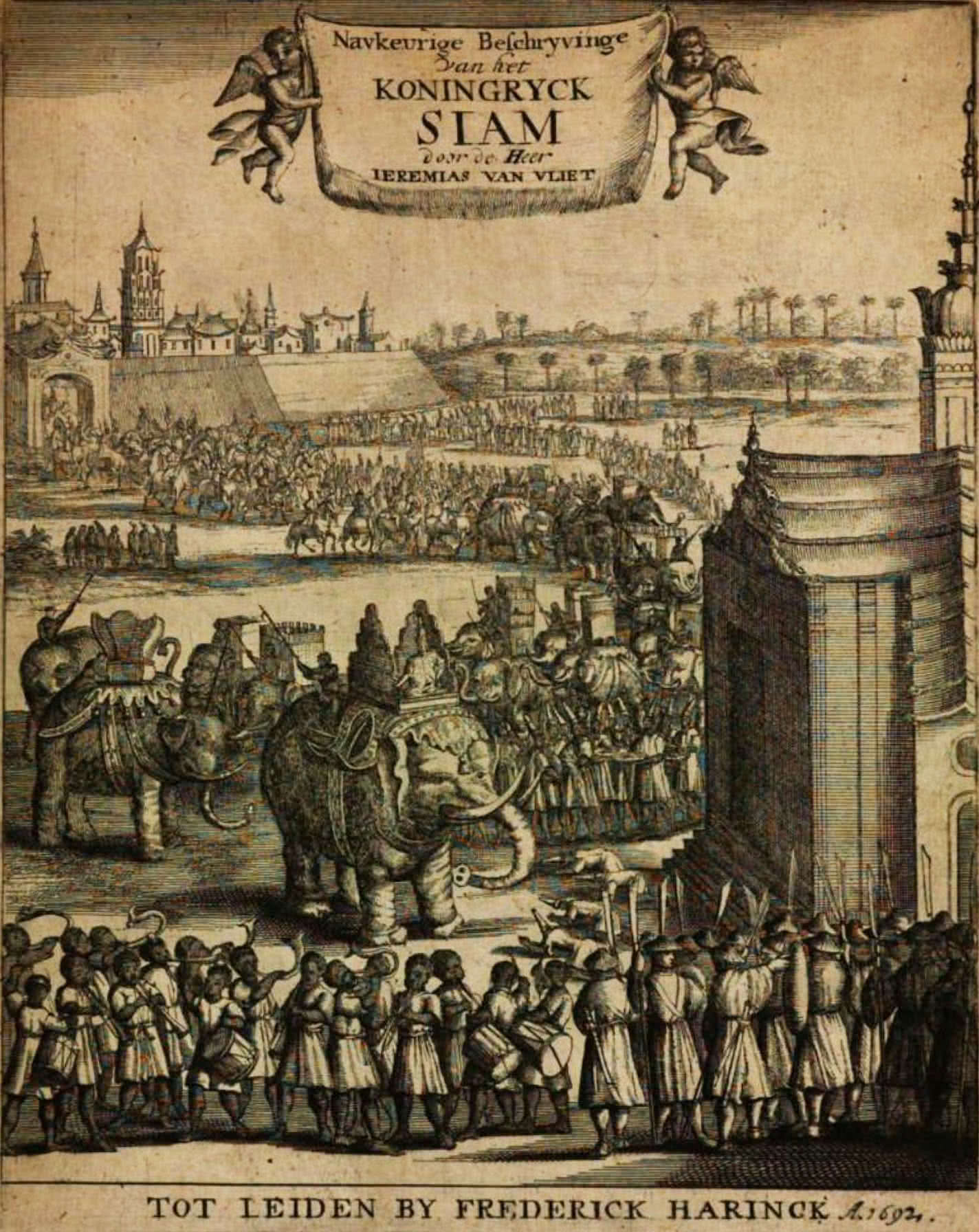
Conscription of Siamese soldiers, reign of King Narai.

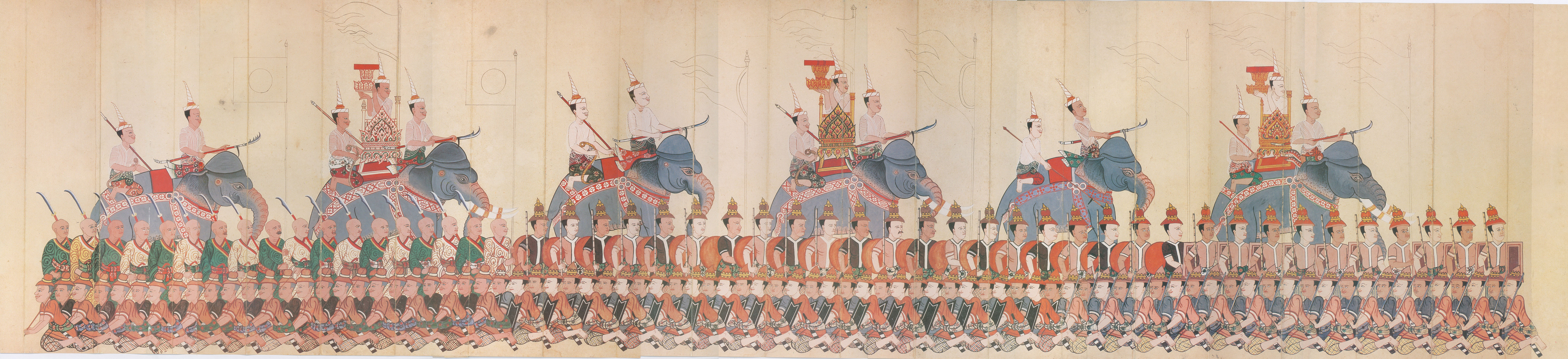
A Royal Procession ("Krabuan Phayuhayattra" (กระบวนพยุหยาตรา)) during the reign of King Narai.

Domestic policies in King Narai's reign were greatly affected by the interference of foreign powers most notably the Chinese to the north, the Dutch to the South, and the English who were making their first forays into India to the west. Policies revolved around either directly countering the influence, or creating a delicate balance of power between the different parties.

In 1660, the Chinese invaded the Burmese capital at Ava to capture Zhu Youlang, the last Southern Ming emperor. Sensing a possible weakening of Burmese influence in the northern vassal states, King Narai began the Burmese–Siamese War of 1662–64 to bring Chiang Mai under the direct control of Ayutthaya. Although the expedition was successful in taking control of Lampang and other smaller cities, a second expedition had to be conducted to bring Chiang Mai under control in 1662. After stopping a Burmese army incursion in 1663 at Sai Yok, Narai led an army of 60,000 in an invasion of Burma, capturing Martaban, Syriam, Rangoon, Hongsawadi, and then in 1664 laid siege to Pagan. After "causing many casualties in dead and wounded and capturing many prisoners of war", the Siamese retreated.

Narai also handed over control of Mergui to French officer Chevalier de Beauregard and his small French garrison. At the same time, he also granted a concession of the strategic port of Bangkok to Beauregard, with the view of countering Dutch influence.

King Narai also built a new palace at present-day Lopburi ("Louvo" in the French accounts) utilising the expertise of Jesuit architects and engineers. European influences are clearly evident in the architectural style, especially the use of wide windows. The move to Lopburi was arguably prompted by the Dutch naval blockade of Ayutthaya in 1664 to enforce a fur monopoly.

== Foreign affairs ==
Although Catholic missions had been present in Ayutthaya as early as 1567 under Portuguese Dominicans, King Narai's reign saw the first concerted attempt to convert the monarch to Catholicism under the auspices of French Jesuits who were given permission to settle in Ayutthaya in 1662. The conversion attempt ultimately failed and arguably backfired but Catholics were to remain in Siam up to the present day.

The most remarkable aspect of King Narai's reign were the diplomatic missions that he sent and received during his reign. Missions were sent as far afield as France, England, and the Vatican, although at least two missions were lost at sea. Ties with states closer to Ayutthaya were not neglected as missions were also sent to Persia, Golconda (India), China, as well as other neighbouring states.

Undoubtedly, the most celebrated of these missions were those to Europe, in particular France. In 1673, a French ecclesiastical mission arrived at the Siamese court with letters from Pope Clement IX and King Louis XIV of France. King Narai reciprocated by sending a mission to France in 1680 led by Phya Pipatkosa. Although the mission was lost at sea near Madagascar, the French would respond positively by sending a commercial mission to Ayutthaya headed by Monsignor Pallu in 1682.

=== Rising French influence ===
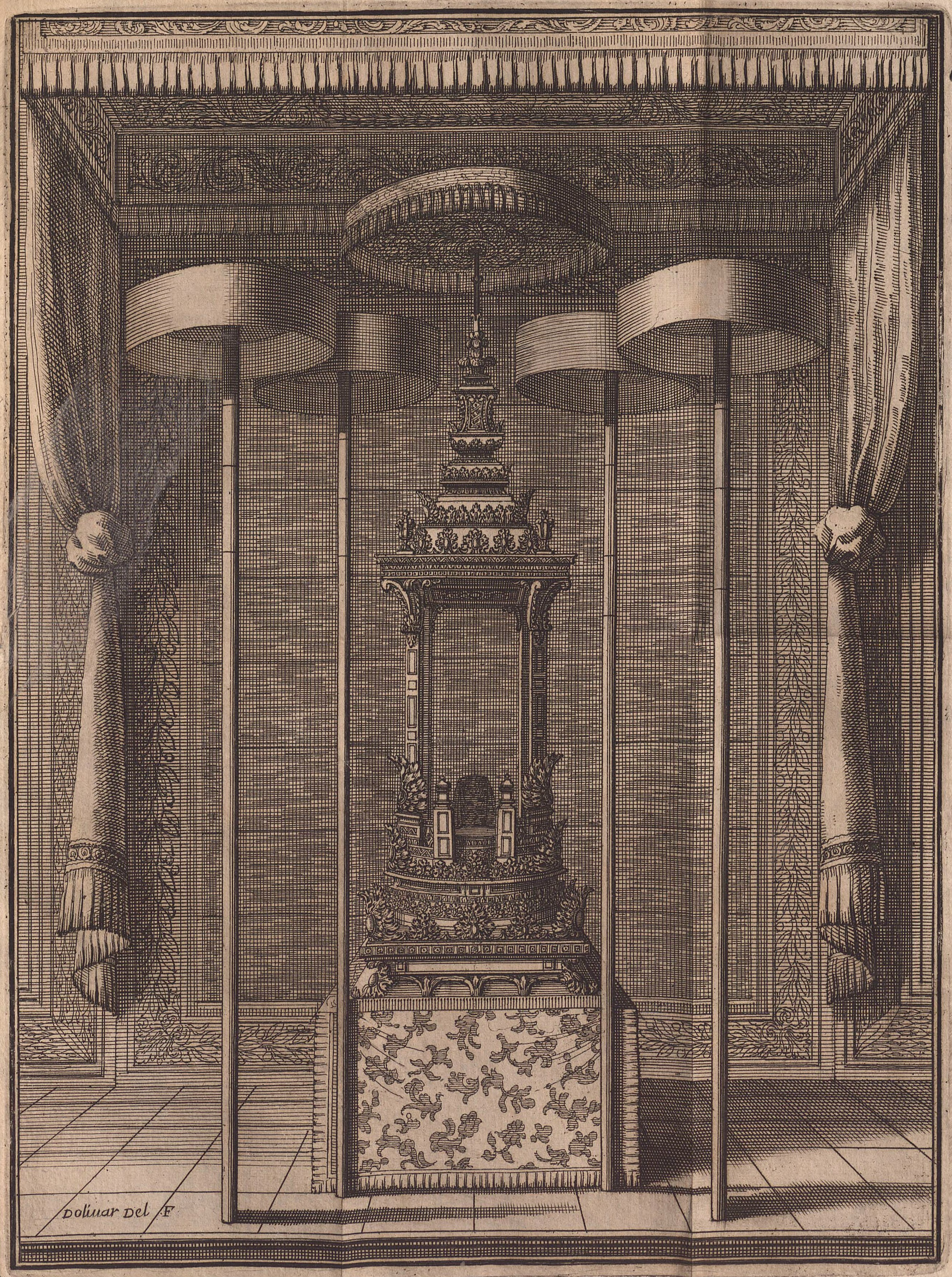
Busabok with Letter of Narai to Louis XIV 1686

Most controversially, King Narai allowed the rise of Constantine Phaulkon, a Greek adventurer who first arrived in Ayutthaya in 1675, formerly worked for the English East India Company. Phaulkon was introduced into the court by minister of foreign affairs and trade Kosa Lek in 1681 as a quick-witted interpreter and quickly gained the royal favor. In 1682 he served as the interpreter during the royal audience with François Pallu, who arrived with letters from Louis XIV. Within a few years, Phaulkon had managed to ingratiate himself with the king and became Narai's closest counselor. Phaulkon suggested a plan for the reconstruction of the fort of Mergui in polygonal European style, which was strongly opposed by Kosa Lek. Kosa Lek was later accused of receiving bribes from peasants who did not want to be drafted into the Mergui construction. He was flogged to death under royal orders.

The second half of Narai's reign was a period of growing French influence as facilitated by Phaulkon. Under Phaulkon's guidance, King Narai balanced the influence of the Dutch by favouring the French. Phaulkon also encouraged French interest by initially leading them to believe that the king was about to convert to Catholicism. Although King Narai did display a degree of interest in Catholicism, he also displayed an equal interest in Islam and there is no concrete evidence that he wished to convert to either. However, both Catholic and Islamic missions were to come to the conclusion that Phaulkon was responsible for their failures. Siamese courtiers also resented Phaulkon's influence and he quickly became the focus of xenophobic sentiments at court, with the future King Phetracha at their head.

Narai responded the French by the dispatch of Siamese mission to France in January 1684 led by Khun Pijaivanit and Khun Pijitmaitri accompanied by missionary Benigne Vachet. They reached Calais by November and eventually had the French royal audience. Louis XIV sent de Chaumont as chief ambassador, and de Choisy to lead the French mission in 1685 to return the Siamese ambassadors and to convert Narai to Catholicism. The mission contained a large number of Jesuit priests and scientists. Colbert sent his letter to Phaulkon to instruct him to persuade the Siamese king to concede to French requests with the promises of granting him the rank of count.

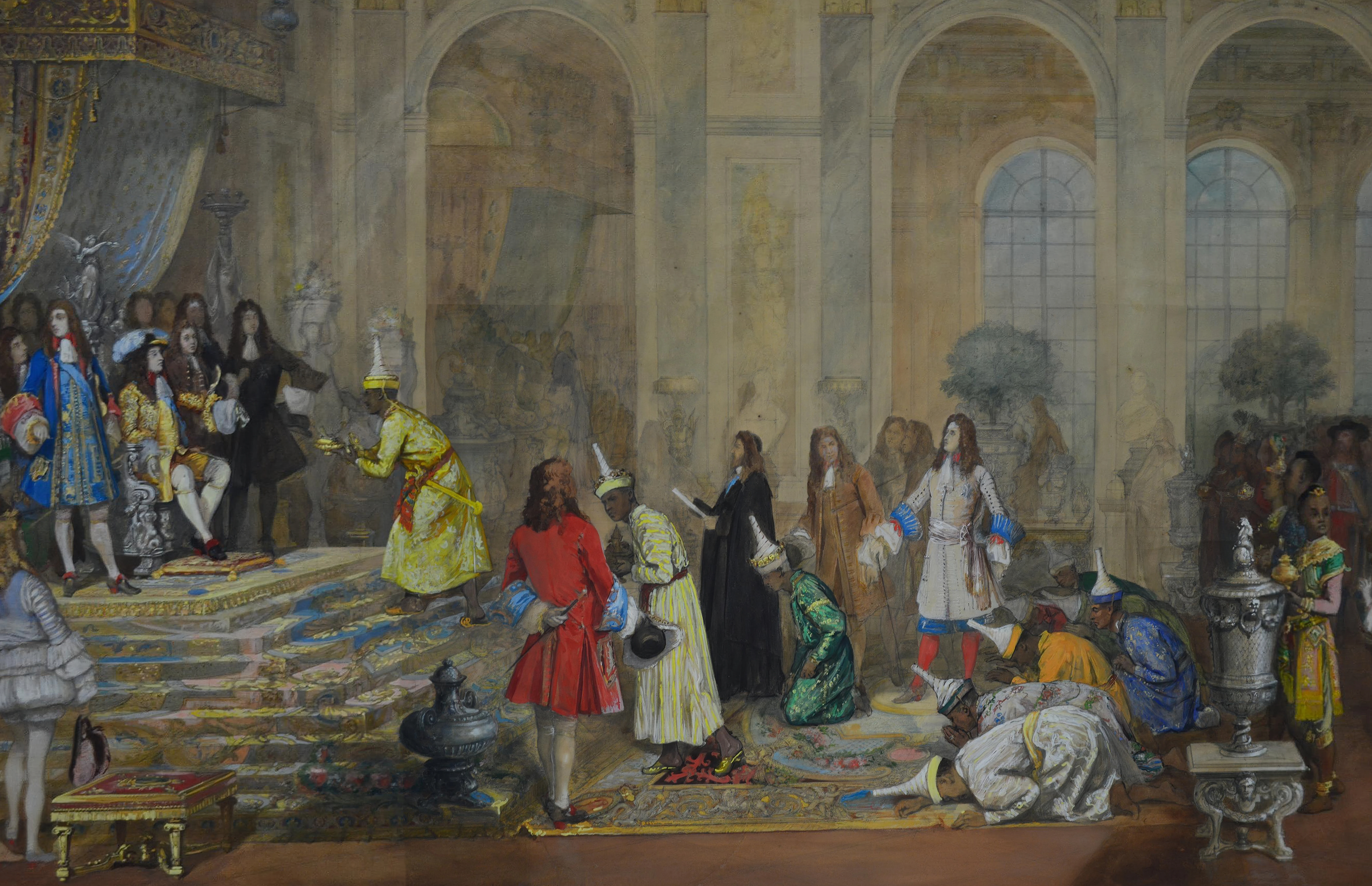
Kosa Pan presents King Narai's letter to Louis XIV at Versailles, 1 September 1686. Painting by Jacques Leman

Though he did not convert to Christianity, Narai agreed to allow the French troops to be stationed in Siamese ports. Chevalier de Forbin was made commander of the Bangkok fort and trained Siamese armies in Western warfare. Several Siamese forts including Mergui, Ligor, Singora (Songkhla), Lavo, and Ayutthaya itself were reconstructed in European style. Another Siamese mission to France was led by Phra Visutsundhorn (Kosa Pan, younger brother of Kosa Lek) and Guy Tachard in 1686 with enthusiastic European reception. A fragmentary Siamese account of the mission compiled by Kosa Pan was re-discovered in Paris in the 1980s. In 1686, a revolt broke out in Ayutthaya, caused by the Makassars whom were seeking asylum in Siam after being expelled by the Dutch Empire. Constantine Phaulkon and Forbin mobilized the defence of the Kingdom, with the forces of Ayutthaya made up from a coalition of French, English and Siamese troops. The Makassars were subsequently defeated and Narai had many burnt at the stake.

Samuel White, the English governor of Mergui fort, appointed by Narai and a close associate of Phaulkon, entered into conflict with the English fleets from India in 1687, leading to the English blockade of Mergui. The Siamese native mandarins massacred the local Englishmen out of frustration. With English fleets threatening his kingdom, Narai decided to placate the English and executed the mandarins.

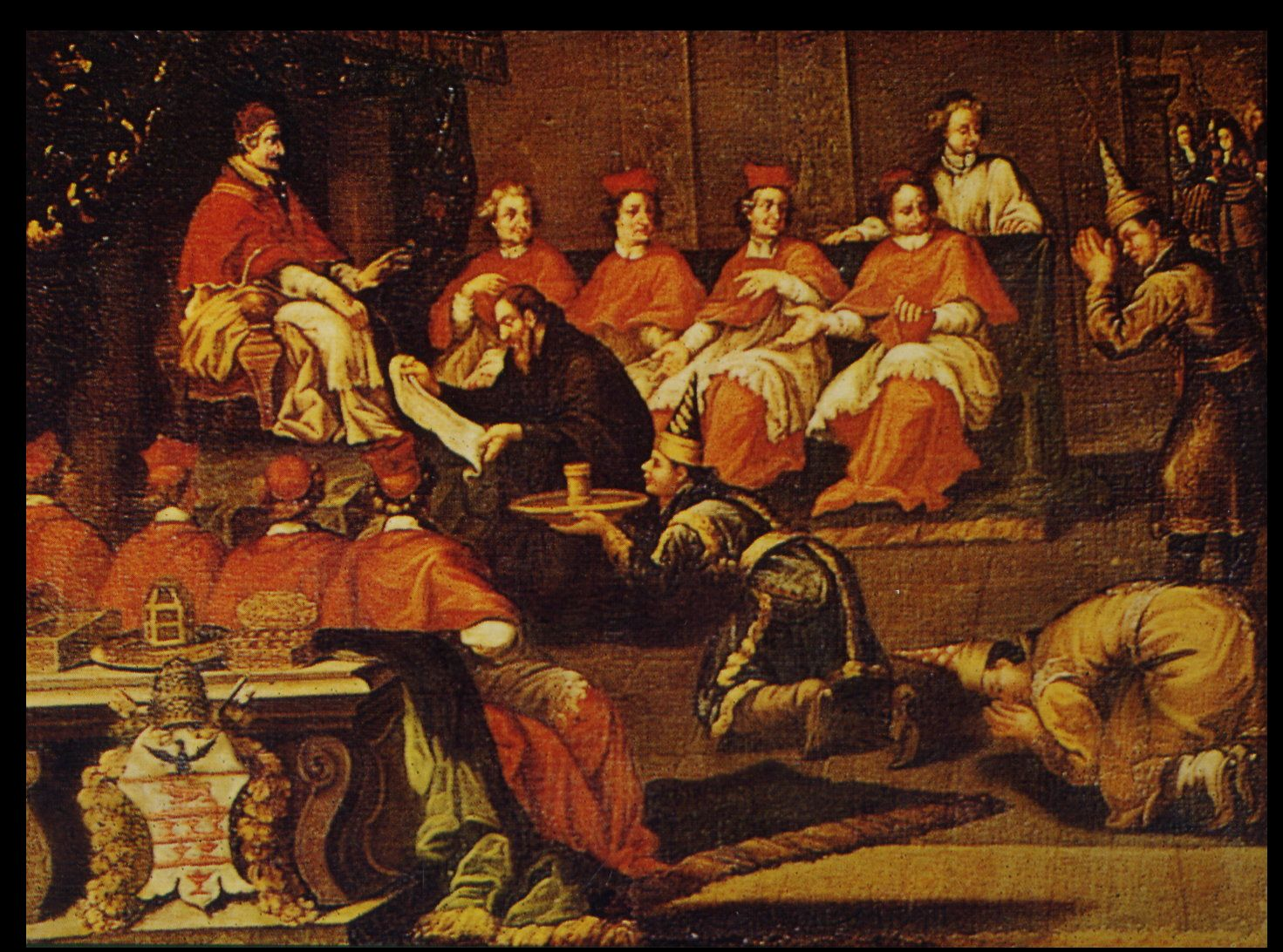
Pope Innocent XI receives the Siamese envoys, led by Father Tachard who reads the translation of the message from King Narai, December 1688

In 1687 the new French mission left Brest for Ayutthaya. The mission included Kosa Pan returning home, Guy Tachard again, Simon de La Loubère, Claude Céberet du Boullay, and General Desfarges. A French army regiment was sent with this mission to be stationed in Siamese forts with Desfarges as the military commander. Narai agreed to station French troops at Mergui and Bangkok, both with Western-style forts. Desfarges was stationed at Bangkok. (The fort is now called the Vijaiprasit Fort Thai: ป้อมวิไชยประสิทธิ์ later the royal fort of King Taksin). The last Siamese embassy was led by Ok-khun Chamnan in 1688 visiting Rome and Pope Innocent XI.

== The "Revolution" of 1688 ==
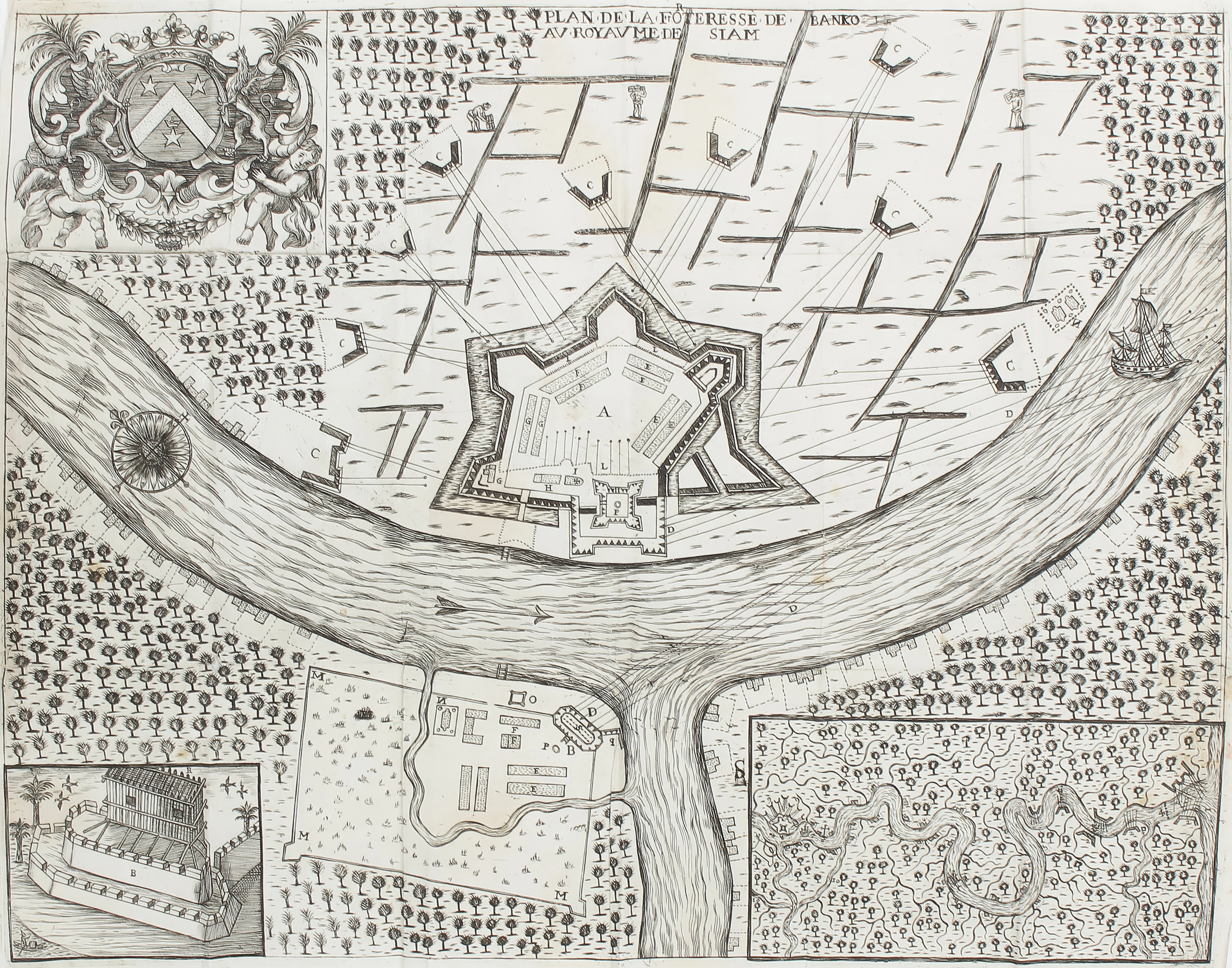
The siege of the French fortress in Bangkok by the Siamese revolutionary forces of Phetracha in 1688.

Narai spent his whole reign reducing the power of native mandarins that had caused much bloodshed during his predecessors’ time. He firstly supported Persian, and later, the French guards and advisors, against the Thai mandarins. Even his ascension to the throne was orchestrated by Persian mercenaries. The French eventually enjoyed special favors from religious affairs to the military activities. One of the critical turning points was concerned with the construction of the French forts and military barracks in Bangkok, near the mouth of the Chao Phraya River. In dealing with the activities, the French mostly depended on Constantine Phaulkon, the king's favorite. The threat of the French military presence reportedly was felt among the court nobles. All in all, factionalism, favoritism and nepotism became widespread. The native mandarins somehow managed to retain their powers, most notably Kosa Lek.

Petracha, Commander of the Royal Regiment of Elephants, emerged as the leading "nationalist". Petracha had familial connections to Narai, with his mother being the king's wet nurse and his sister being the king's concubine.

Narai was said to fear fathering a son. He therefore ordered abortions to be carried out on any of his impregnated consorts. However he adopted the son of a minor mandarin with the name of Phra Pi and named him his successor. The young prince was embraced by the French, who managed to convert him to Catholicism.

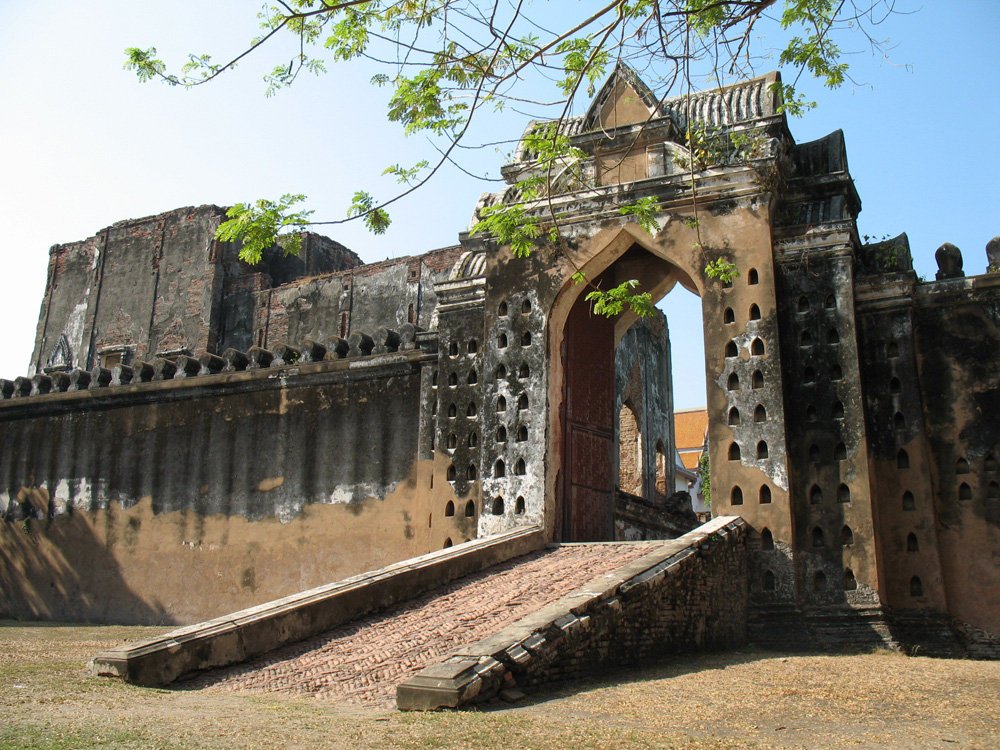
Inner gate of King Narai's Palace in Lopburi, built in 1666. King Narai stayed there for about eight to nine months each year.

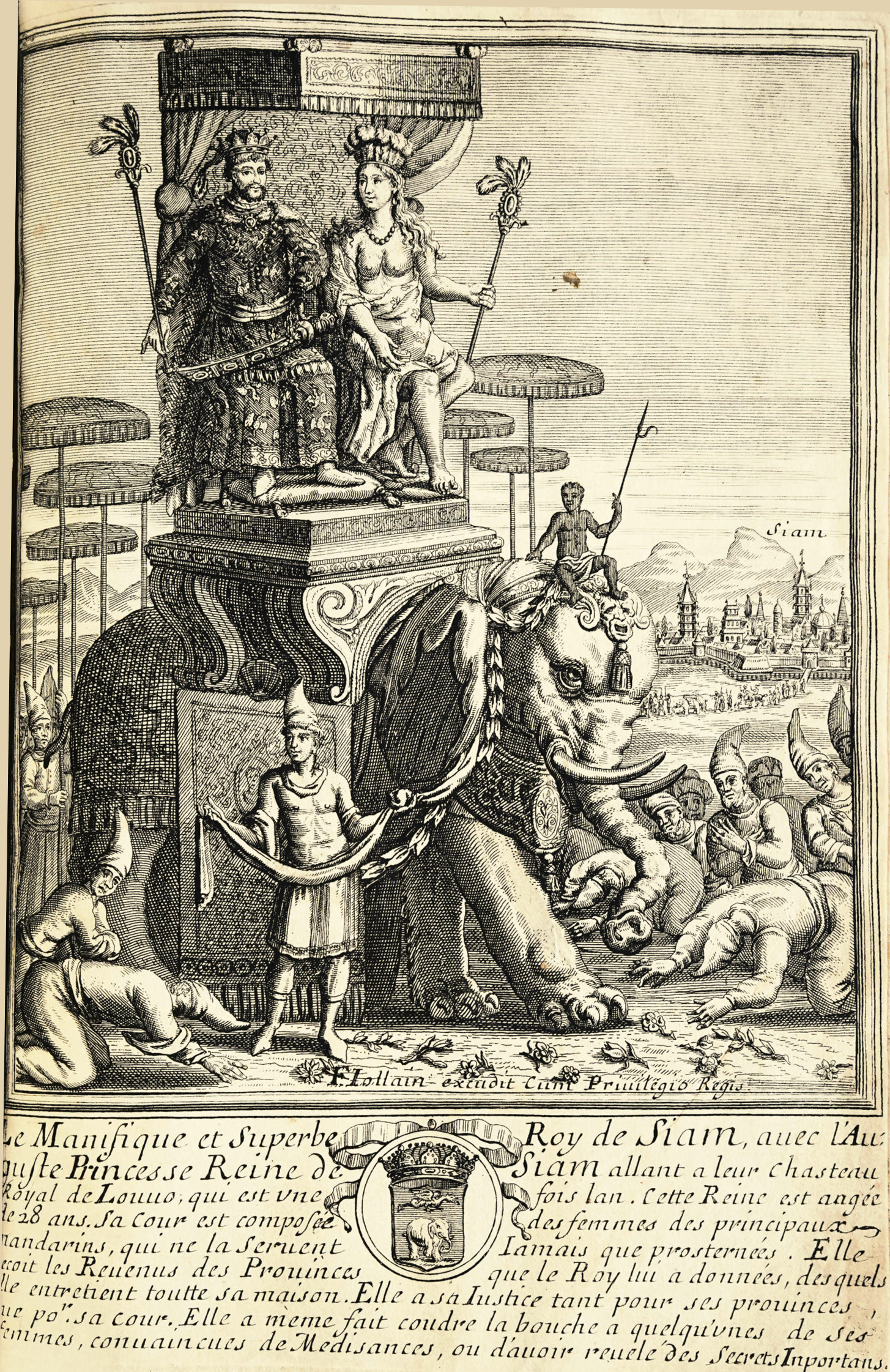
King Narai of Siam and Princess Yothathep on an elephant.

Matters were brought to a head when King Narai fell gravely ill in March 1688 while staying in his Lopburi palaces. Aware of the coming succession dispute, in May 1688, Narai called together his closest councillors: Phaulkon, Phra Phetracha, and Phra Pi, and nominated his daughter, Princess (Kromluang) Yothathep, to succeed him. The three councillors were to act as regents until the princess took on a partner of her choice from one of the two Siamese councillors.

When Narai was seriously ill with no hopes of recovery, on 18 May 1688 Phetracha had a successful coup and arrested Narai himself, Phra Pi, and his half-brothers Prince Aphaithot and Prince Noi. Phaulkon was summoned to the palace, there he and his French officers were surrounded and disarmed. Phaulkon was thrown to the palace dungeon and brutally tortured.

After questioning Phra Pi, he discovered Phra Pi had conspired with Phaulkon to assume the throne, and Phra Pi was executed on 20 May. Further questioning of Phaulkon revealed a plot to raise a rebellion, and he too was executed by Phetracha's adopted son Luang Sorasak on 5 June. Narai, on his deathbed, was unable to do anything, except curse Phetracha and his son. Luang Sorasak then had Prince Aphaithot and Prince Noi executed.

Phetracha soon ordered his troops to attack the French troops led by General Desfarges at the start of the Siege of Bangkok. On the death of King Narai on 10/11 July, Phetracha proclaimed himself king. After withholding the siege for four months and later a negotiated settlement, the French soldiers were allowed to return to France. Only the Dutch were allowed to trade in the capital before the French and English finally ended their dispute with Siam.

== Legacy ==
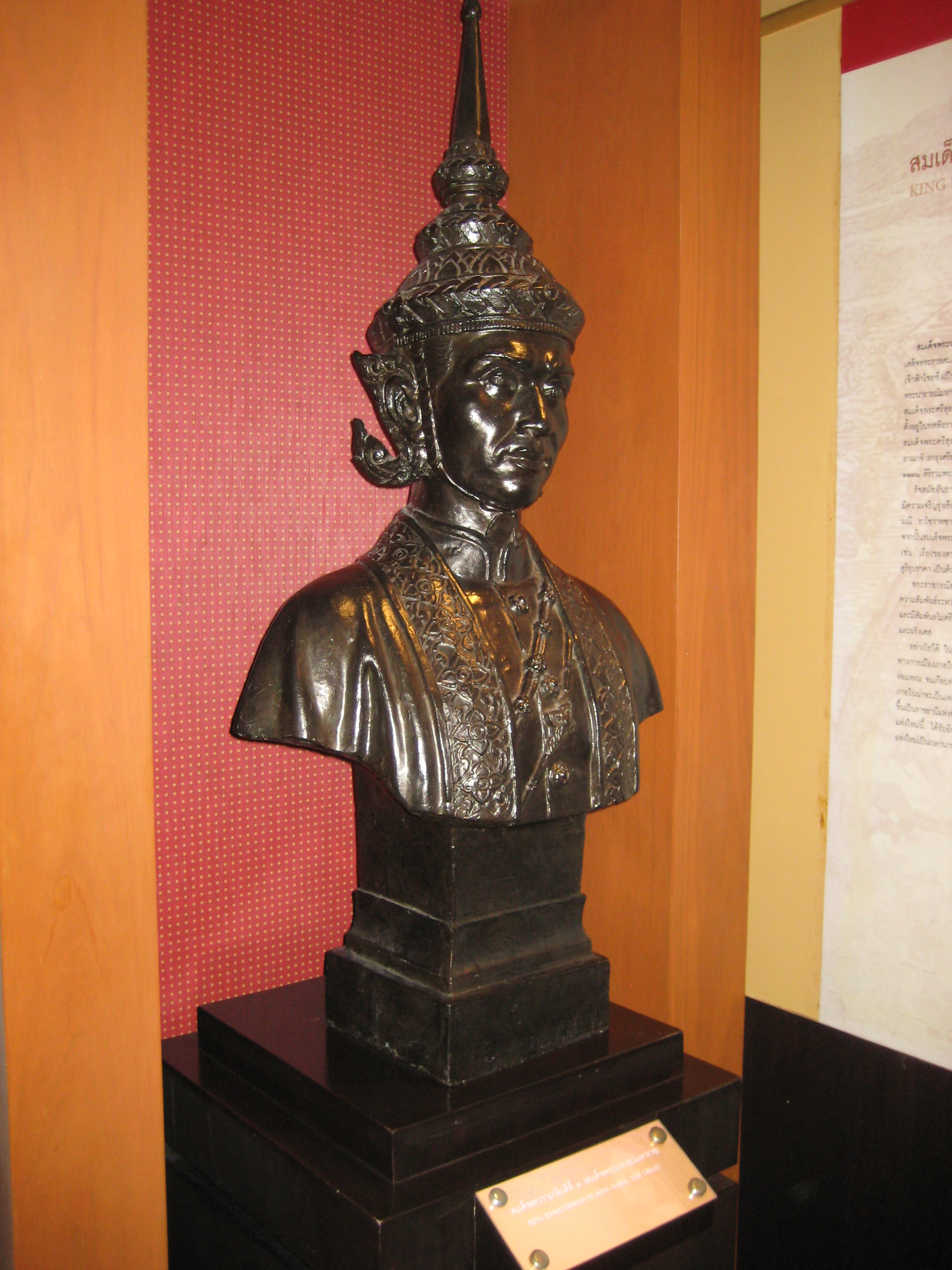
Statue of King Narai, displayed at Bangkok National Museum.

Although King Narai's reign witnessed the greatest extent of foreign influence at the Siamese court, his diplomatic achievements were to be reversed by his successor. It is debatable whether the new introspective attitude of his successors contributed to the weakening and eventual fall of Ayutthaya. On the other hand, the curtailing of foreign influences in the court may have prevented the colonisation of Ayutthaya. Nevertheless, the diplomatic achievements of his reign contributed to his posthumous designation as 'the Great', making him one of eight monarchs so recognized in the history of Thailand.

At the same time, the records of those involved in the diplomatic missions, particularly those from the west, have allowed historians to obtain a rare glimpse into the world of the Ayutthayan court as most original Ayutthaya records were destroyed with the city in 1767. These include the French accounts of the Chevalier de Chaumont, the Abbé de Choisy, Fr. Tachard, Claude de Forbin, de la Loubere and the Persian account of Muhammad Rabi' ibn Muhammad Ibrahim. Domestically, the relative stability during his reign also gave rise to the revival of Siamese literature during his reign.

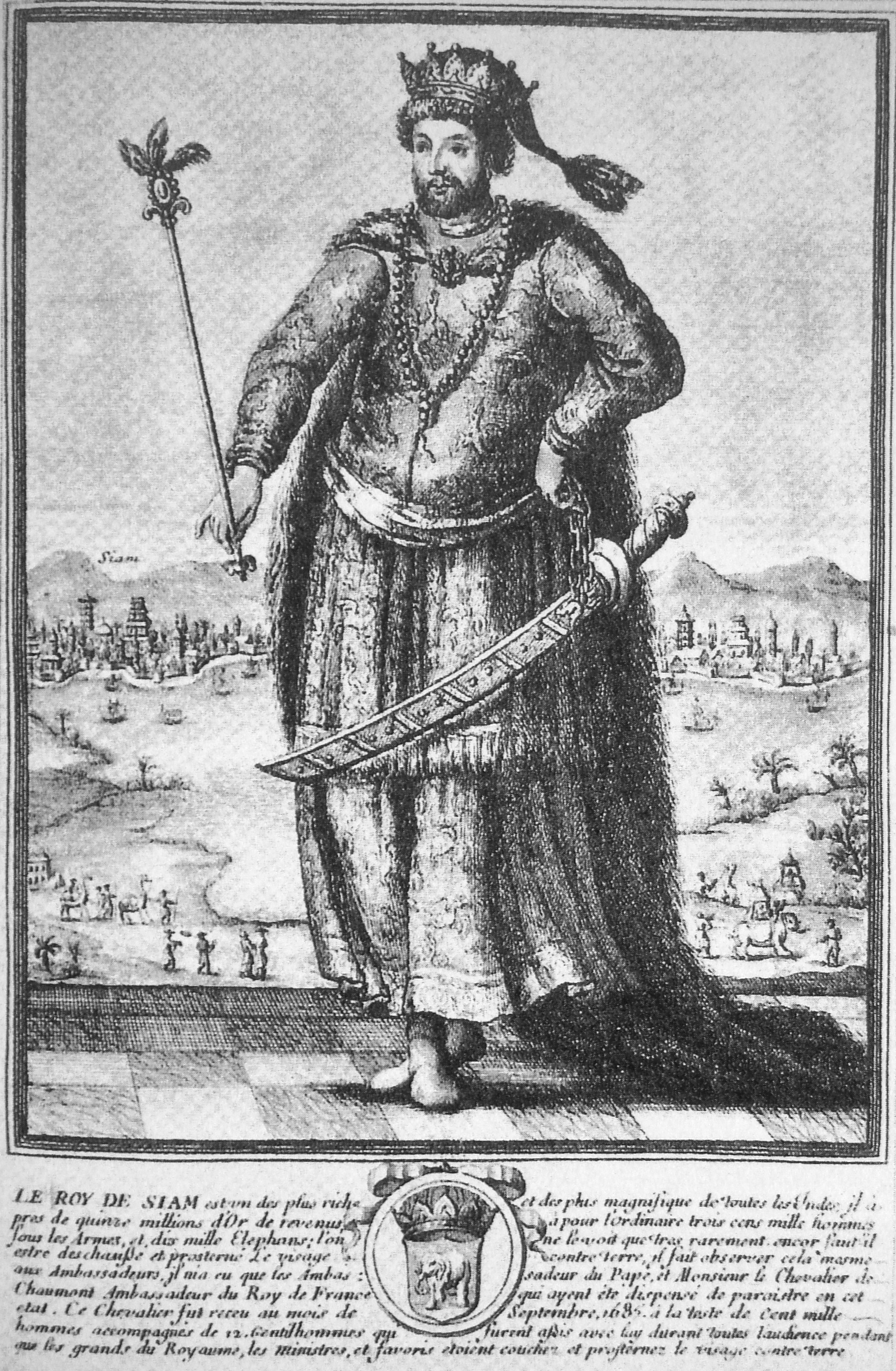
Contemporary French depiction of King Narai.

Further afield, one of the main streets of the city of Brest as well as another in Marseille have been named "Rue de Siam" to commemorate Narai's missions, whilst an ancient street in Lopburi Province, where Narai dwelt at the time he received the Chevalier de Chaumont, has been named "Rue de France" by the Thai government in 1985 to commemorate the 300th anniversary of the relations between the two countries.

In addition, among the gifts that were exchanged between the Siamese and the French courts, two items from Siam were to have an unexpected impact on French history. The items were a pair of silver cannons that were eventually stored in the Royal Furniture Repository in Paris since they were classed as gifts rather than weapons. After failing to find usable weapons at the Arsenal, rioting Parisians broke into the Repository and discovered some 20 cannons. However, the Siamese cannons were the only ones that still functioned, and so they were hauled to the Bastille. The date was 14 July 1789.

In King Narai's reign, Thai literature flourished, especially royal panegyrics. The "Eulogy of King Prasat Thong" about the king's father was probably composed early in the reign, and the "Eulogy of King Narai" around 1680.

King Narai Hospital, the main hospital of Lopburi Province is named after him.

== In popular culture ==
- Portrayed by Somthawin Mukdaprakorn in the 1957 Thai film Si Prat
- Portrayed by Somchai Asanachinda in the 1979 RTA5 TV drama Khunseuk Maharat
- Portrayed by Siri Mangkala in the 2007 Thai film Si Prat
- Portrayed by Suchao Pongvilai in the 2015 Thai film Phan Thai Norasing
- Portrayed by Praptpadol Suwanbang in the 2018 and 2023 CH3HD TV drama Love Destiny and Love Destiny 2
- Portrayed by Mawin Taweephol in the 2026 CH3HD TV series Love Destiny (Boy's Love)

== See also ==
- France-Thailand relations
- Constantine Phaulkon
- Claude de Forbin
- François-Timoléon de Choisy

== Notes ==
Narai House of Prasat Thong Born: 16 February 1633 Died: 11 July 1688
Regnal titles
Preceded by Si Suthammaracha	King of Ayutthaya; 26 October 1656 – 11 July 1688	Succeeded by Phetracha
Vacant Title last held by Si Saorak	Viceroy of Ayutthaya; 1656	Vacant Title next held by Sorasak
