= Claude de Forbin =

French military officer and diplomat (1656–1733)

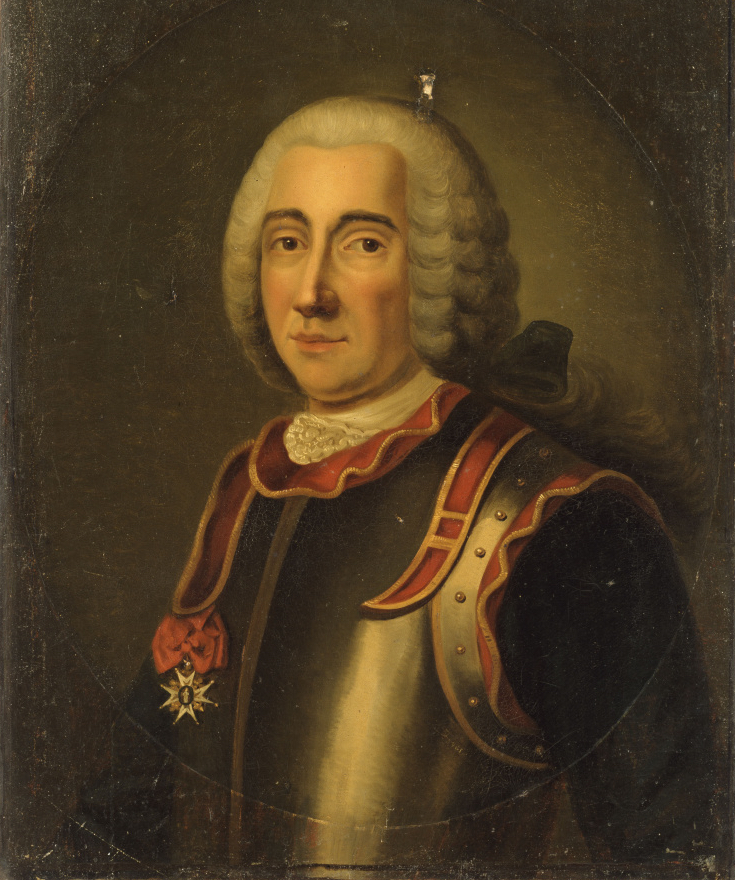
- Portrait by Antoine Graincourt
- Born: 6 August 1656; Gardanne, Provence
- Died: 4 March 1733 (aged 76) Near Marseille, France
- Allegiance: France; Ayutthaya Kingdom
- Branch: French Navy; Siamese army
- Rank: Lieutenant général des armées navales (French Navy)
- Conflicts: 1686 Makassar revolt; Nine Years' War; Battle of Beachy Head (1690); Battle of Lagos (1693); Battles of Barfleur and La Hougue; War of the Spanish Succession; Action of 2 May 1707; Battle at The Lizard; Planned French invasion of Britain (1708)

Lieutenant général des armées navales Claude, comte de Forbin-Gardanne (6 August 1656 – 4 March 1733) was a French military officer and diplomat. From 1685 to 1688, he led a diplomatic mission to the Ayutthaya Kingdom. He became governor of Bangkok and a general in the Siamese army, and left Siam shortly before King Narai fell ill and was deposed by the Siamese revolution of 1688. Returning to Europe, he served in French Navy during the Nine Years' War and the War of the Spanish Succession.

== Early life ==
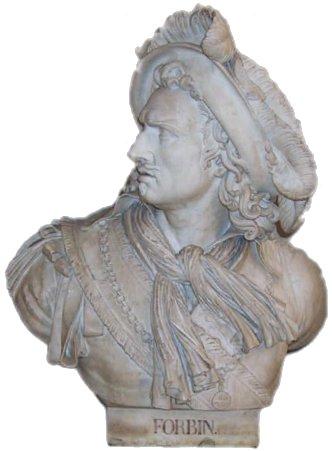
Claude de Forbin-Gardanne

Claude de Forbin was born in the village Gardanne in the Provence, as a member of a family established in Marseille in the 14th century. Later divided into several branches, Claude de Forbin was the most famous of the branch Forbin Gardanne. High-spirited and ungovernable in his boyhood, he ran away from his home, and through the influence of an uncle entered the navy, serving his first campaign in 1675. For a short time he quit the navy and entered the musketeers. There, he killed the chevalier de Gourdon in a duel, and was sentenced to death by the Parliament of Aix; he managed to obtain a grace and joined the Navy under his brother's identity. He served under Jean d'Estrées, Count of Estrées during the American campaign, and under Duquesne that of Algiers in 1683, on all occasions distinguishing himself by his impetuous courage.

=== Grand Admiral of Siam ===
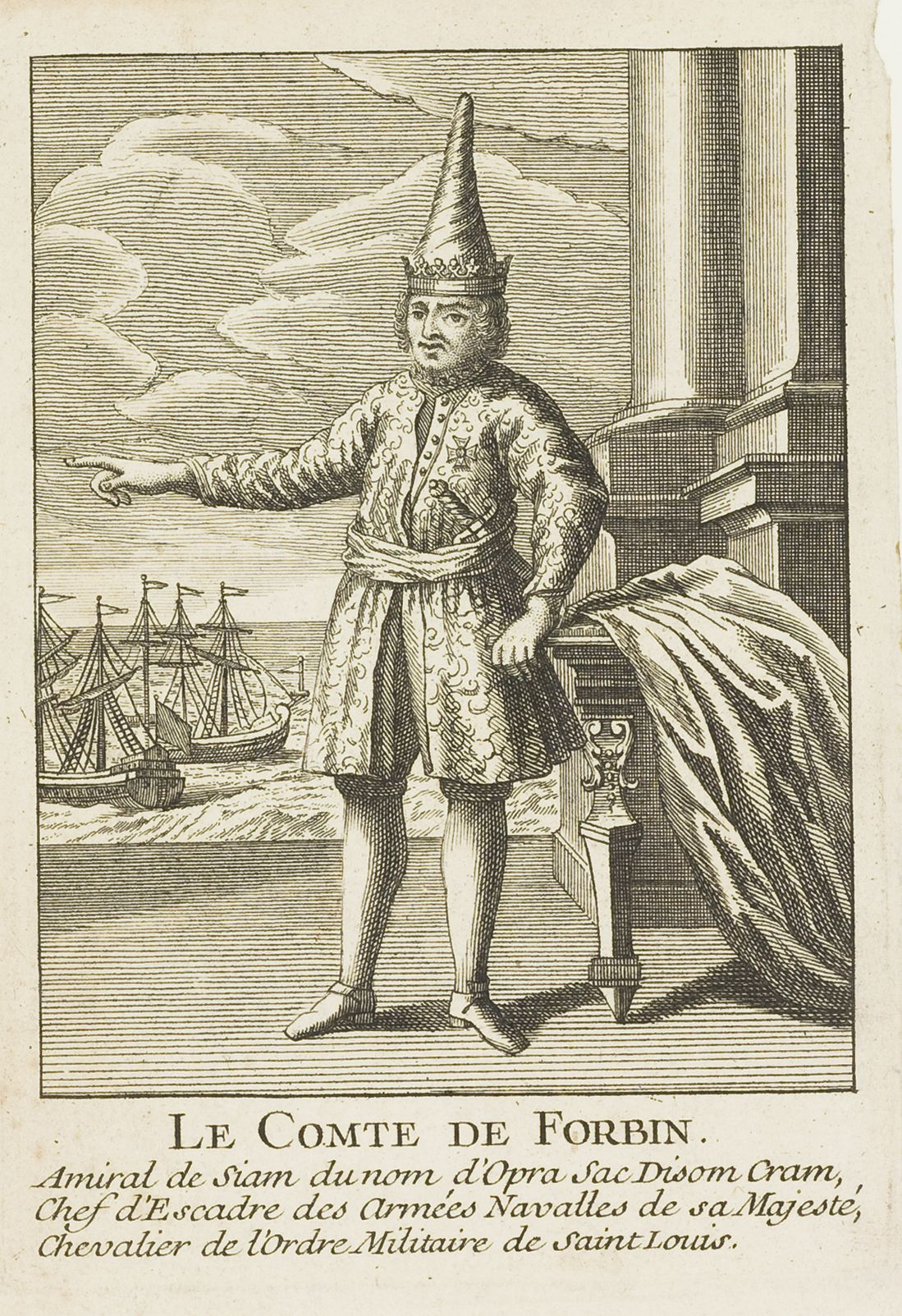
Chevalier de Forbin in Siamese noble attire, holding the title of "Ok-phra Sakdisongkhram".

The most remarkable episode of his life was his mission to Siam. During the administration of the Greek adventurer Phaulcon in that country, the project was formed of introducing the Christian religion and European civilisation, and the king sent an embassy to Louis XIV. In response a French embassy was sent out, Forbin accompanying the Chevalier de Chaumont with the rank of major aboard the Oiseau. When Chaumont returned to France, Forbin was induced to remain in the service of the Siamese king, and accepted, though with much reluctance, the posts of grand admiral, general of all the king's armies and governor of Bangkok. During his tenure he participated in suppressing the 1686 Makassar revolt at Bangkok, although almost at the cost of his own life.

His position, however, was soon made untenable by the jealousy and intrigues of the minister Constantine Phaulkon; and at the end of two years he left Siam, reaching France in 1688. He was replaced as governor of Bangkok by the Chevalier de Beauregard.

== Nine Years' War ==
De Forbin was afterwards fully engaged in active service, first with Jean Bart in the Nine Years' War, when they escorted a convoy; attacked by superior English forces, Forbin, aboard the Jeux, and Jean Bart, aboard the Railleuse, sacrificed themselves in a delaying action to allow the convoy the escape. They were both captured and taken to Plymouth. They succeeded in making their escape after 11 days, crossed the Channel on a small craft, and soon resumed active service.

Promoted to ship-of-the-line captain in June 1689, he commanded Neptune at the Battle of Beachy Head. After a campaign in the North Sea in 1691, he commanded the Perle in Battles of Barfleur and La Hougue, where he was wounded. He greatly distinguished himself at the Battle of Lagos in 1693. Commanding the Marquis in 1695, he campaigned in the Mediterranean and Constantinople. In 1697, he served in Catalonia in the siege of Barcelona.

== War of the Spanish Succession and death ==
During the War of the Spanish Succession, he led a three-ship of the line squadron in the Adriatic, where he blockaded Venice, bombed Trieste and ransomed Fiume. In 1703 and 1704, he hunted down Dutch privateers operating out of Vlissingen. In June 1706, he attacked a British convoy, capturing seven ships; on 12 July, he seized two Dutch ships, and on 28 October, engaging a strongly escorted Dutch convoy, he captured three ships and sank another one. In 1707, he was promoted to chef d'escadre. On 12 May he captured a British convoy of 18 ships en route for Portugal. In the summer he led the Mars and a division into the White Sea, returning to Brest on 23 September with 34 prizes.

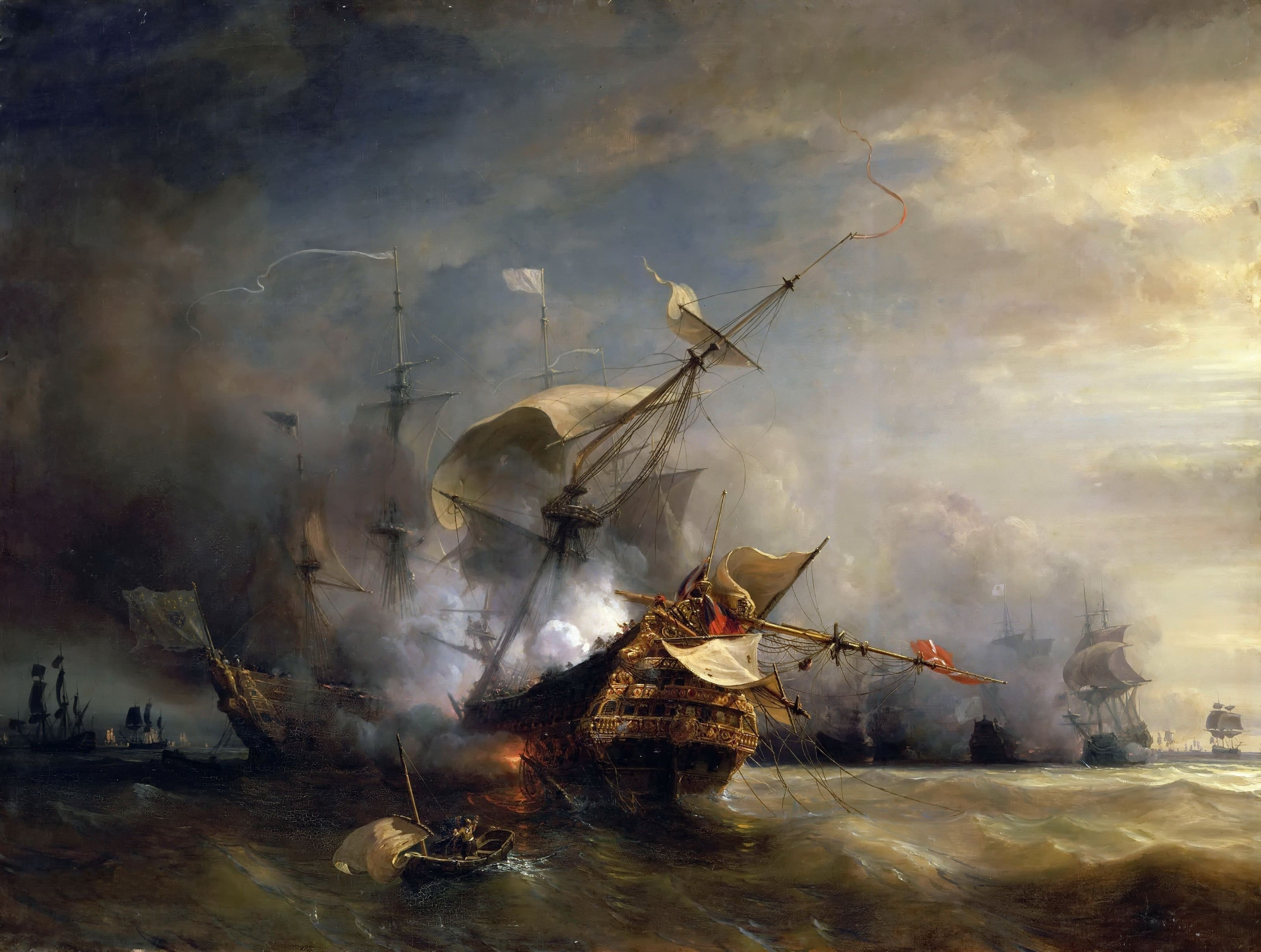
Battle at The Lizard (1707), by Jean Antoine Théodore de Gudin.

On 21 October in the Battle at the Lizard, he helped René Duguay-Trouin in attacking a British convoy set for Portugal: of 80 ships, 15 merchantman and three ships of the line were captured, and 1 other was sunk. In 1708, he led Prince James Francis Edward Stuart to Scotland, in an attempt to reclaim the British throne; ill-prepared, the attempt failed, and Forbin ceased to navigate. He left the French navy in January 1715, and died on 4 March 1733 in Saint-Marcel Castle near Marseille. His Memories were published in 1730, written by his secretary.

== See also ==
- France-Thailand relations
- Six vessels of the French Navy bore the name (see French ship Forbin)
