= Burmese–Siamese War (1662–1664) =

War fought in the 17th century

- Part of Burmese–Siamese wars
Date	1662–1664
Location	Lan Na, Northern Siam, Tenasserim coast and Burma
Result	Burmese defensive victory

Belligerents
Toungoo Empire (Burma)	Ayutthaya (Siam)

Commanders and leaders
Pye Min	Narai

Units involved
Royal Burmese Army; Royal Burmese Navy; Lan Na Army	Royal Siamese Army; Mon Volunteers (Portugal) Portuguese Volunteers

Strength
Unknown	Unknown

Casualties and losses
Unknown	Unknown

The Burmese–Siamese War (1662–1664) (Thai: สงครามพม่า-สยาม พ.ศ. ๒๒๐๕ or สงครามสยามรุกรานพม่าครั้งที่สอง, lit. "Second Siam invasion of Burma") was a relatively short war fought in the 17th century between the Toungoo Empire of Burma and the Ayutthaya Kingdom / Siam largely over the Lan Na Kingdom and cities of the Tenasserim coast.

== Background ==
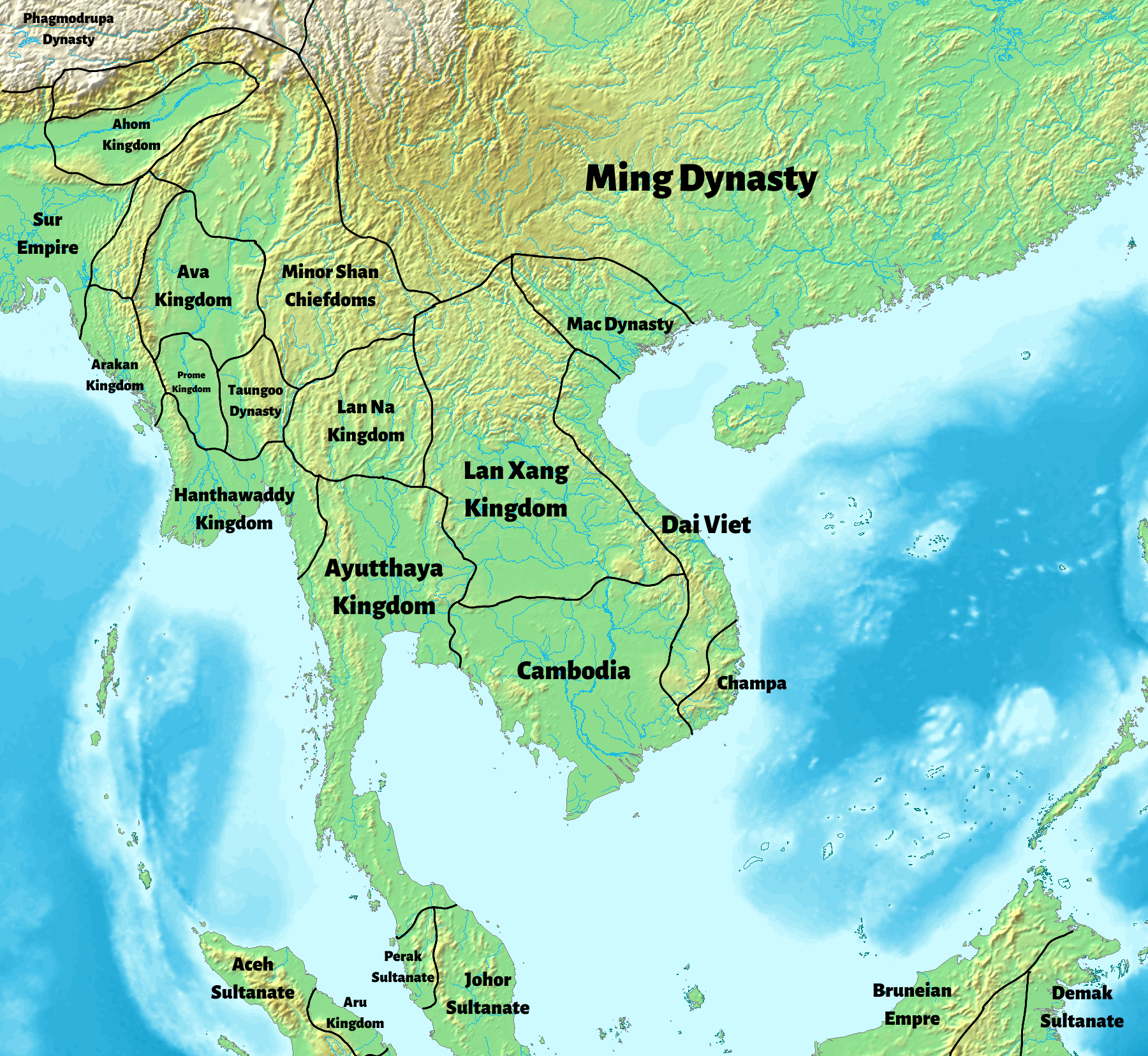
Ayutthaya and Southeast Asia around 1540 CE

In 1644, the army of the Manchus, a people from beyond the Great Wall, entered the Beijing capital city of the Ming dynasty and proclaimed the end of the Ming and the beginning of the Qing. In the following two years, as the Qing extended their control over northern China, Zhu Youlang, the last emperor of the Southern Ming dynasty and the remaining Ming loyalists attempted to regroup in the south, In late January 1659, a Qing army led by Manchu prince Doni took the capital of Yunnan, sending the Yongli Emperor fleeing into nearby Burma, which was then ruled by King Pindale Min of the Toungoo Empire.

The Kingdom of Lan Na at that time was a vassal state of the Toungoo Empire. Fearing that Burma would fall to the Chinese and that Lan Na would be invaded, the ruler of Lan Na sent an ambassador to Ayutthaya asking to be a subject of Siam and seeking military assistance in case of a Chinese invasion.

Welcoming the opportunity to take control of Lan Na, King Narai of Siam dispatched an army which easily occupied Lampang and other small towns in Lan Na as they moved north. By the time the Siamese reached Chiang Mai, however, the Manchus had given up their invasion of Burma while Lan Na had renewed its relationship with the Toungoo and tried to distance itself from the Siamese. Given the nature of the situation, King Narai abandoned his plans to conquest Lan Na and ordered his expeditionary force to return home.

== Siamese Invasion of Lan Na (1662–1663) ==
=== Prelude ===
Concurrent with the withdrawal of the Manchu from Burma and the return home of the Siamese from Lan Na, a revolution was taking place in the Toungoo capital, Ava. In June 1662, Pye Min took control of the Toungoo Empire from his brother Pindale Min and crowned himself king. Sensing the unrest in the Toungoo Empire and a renewed opportunity to take control of Lan Na, King Narai prepared his armies and marched them north in December 1662. Expecting an attack, the ruler of Lan Na sent a request to the Toungoo for military assistance.

=== King Narai's Invasion of Lan Na ===
Ultimately King Narai and two Siamese armies invaded Lan Na and captured Chiang Mai in February 1663 before support from the Toungoo Empire was able to arrive. When the Burmese army did arrive they were caught in a trap, routed, and forced to return to Ava. King Narai quickly established the administrative rules for Lan Na as a suzerain of Siam, gathered the war booty, and returned home. Although, King Narai ordered his military to remain in Chiang Mai and enforce the administration of the country, he did very little else to maintain the ascendancy of Siam in Lan Na.

== Burmese Counterattack in 1663 ==
=== Mon Rebellion ===
Meanwhile in the Tenasserim coastal region, the Burmese were arresting and threatening to execute the Mons who had been conscripted to help defend against the Chinese invasion but failed to report for duty. Threatened with death, the Mons rebelled against the Burmese authorities and burned down Martaban. In response, the Toungoo sent armed forces to put down the revolt. Afraid of retribution, many of the Mon fled into Siam seeking asylum. King Narai ordered Mon nobles in Siam to welcome and receive the refugees.

=== Burmese Invasion of Tenasserim ===
In Burma, the King in Ava suspected that the Siamese were the instigators of the Mon unrest and ordered that a second army proceed to Martaban, put down the rebellion, advance into Siam if necessary and forcibly apprehend the Mon rebels. As the Burmese army reached Martaban, the Siamese became aware of their plans and began to prepare for battle. The Burmese entered Siam at Three Pagodas Pass and advanced over 100 km into Siam to Sai Yok. As the Burmese moved down the Khwae Yai River valley, the Siamese slowly surrounded the invaders. Ultimately King Narai’s armies attacked the Burmese from both the front and the rear. The Burmese were routed and retreated leaving behind many arms and provisions. The Siamese pursued the retreating Burmese back to their own border and stopped, ending Burma’s 1663 invasion of Siam.

== Siamese Invasion of Burma ==
=== Siamese Invasion ===
Shortly thereafter in November 1663, partially in retaliation for the recent invasion and partially because he felt that he had a military advantage, King Narai and the Siamese launched a three-pronged invasion of Burma. The army stationed in Lan Na marched west with the objective to enter Burma at Papun. The Siamese army of the northern provinces marched west via Mae Lameo with the objective to enter Burma and attack Martaban. And a third Siamese army marched northwest via Three Pagodas with the objective to capture Tavoy and then advance on Martaban and Moulmein.

=== Historical Consensus on this Invasion ===
Beyond the fact that Siam invaded Burma, there is disagreement regarding the ultimate territory invaded and the outcome of the campaign. The Burmese acknowledge that the Siamese attacked Martaban and Tavoy, but claim that they defeated the invaders and forced them to retreat home. The Siamese claim that they marched as far north as Ava, invested the capital city, but then returned home when their provisions were exhausted. Among other authors and historians there is some support that the Siamese penetrated southern Burma and captured Rangoon.

=== Damrong Rajanubhab's view ===
Thai statesman, historian, and author, Prince Damrong Rajanubhab examined the campaign histories of both Burma and Siam along with the account of the Mon. In his analysis, Rajanubhab recognized that a campaign all the way to Ava would be quite arduous because of the distance. Regardless, Rajanubhab insists that the Siamese narrative of the campaign is quite detailed and difficult to ignore. Rajanubhab also points out that the Mon narrative supports the Siamese history with the exception that the Mon claim the invasion force attained and invested Bagan, the capital city of the old Bagan Kingdom. Rajanubhab makes the argument that a campaign to Bagan would have been possible whereas a campaign to Ava would have been impossible. It is interesting to note that although Ava is farther north, Bagan is farther west and the distance from Martaban to Bagan (711 kilometers) is actually greater than the distance from Martaban to Ava (693 kilometers.)

For the record, Rajanubhab claims the Siamese invasion force overwhelmed the Burmese with their numerical superiority and easily completed their initial objectives then moved on to capture the cities of Chittagong, Syriam, Rangoon, Hongsawadi, and Prome. Beyond those cities Rajanubhab believes that the Siamese continued their advance north and were ultimately stopped at the fortified city of Bagan. In this account, Bagan was invested by the Siamese with the battle waging back and forth until May 1664 when provisions became scarce and the Siamese retreated home prior to the rainy season. In this account, both forces were decimated and the Burmese allowed King Narai’s armies to retreat back to Siam without pursuit.

The only point of agreement between Rajanubhab's Siamese account and the Burmese account is that the invaders depleted their provisions during the invasion and had to return home.

== Aftermath ==
For all of the struggles whatever they may have been, nothing really changed because of the invasion. The cities of the Tenasserim coast fell back almost immediately under Burmese rule. Later that year, the Siamese relinquished control of Lan Na and returned to Siam as a result of a rebellious populace.

With the end of the hostilities in Burma and the evacuation of Lan Na by the Siamese, Burma and Siam entered a long period of peace lasting for ninety-five years until 1759 when the Alaungpaya dynasty in Burma continued its expansion in Southeast Asia and attacked Siam.

== See also ==
- Burmese–Siamese wars
- Burma–Thailand relations
