= Anthony Weltden =

- Occupation: Colonial Administrator
- Known for: President of Bengal

Anthony Weltden was an administrator of the English East India Company. He served as President of Bengal in the early eighteenth century.

Political offices
Preceded by Council	President of Bengal; 20 July 1710 – 4 March 1711	Succeeded by John Russell
