= Iran–Thailand relations =

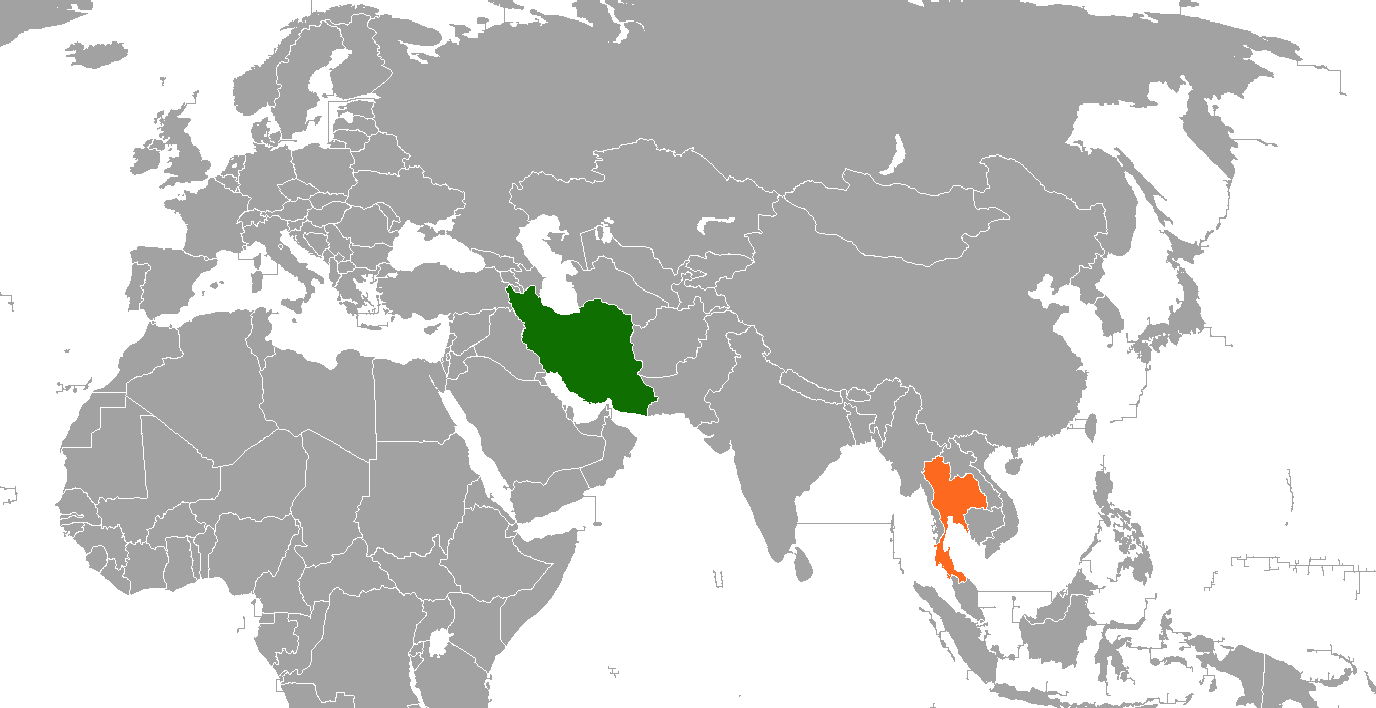

- Iran: Thailand

Iran–Thailand relations refer to the bilateral relations between Iran and Thailand. Iran has an embassy in Bangkok while Thailand has an embassy in Tehran.

== History ==
Relations between the two countries began when visits of Persian diplomatic delegations to Siam are attested as early as 1685. Indo-Persians made up the largest group of Muslims from the 16th to 18th centuries. Influential Persian families like the Bunnag dominated Thai courts for some time.

Following the lifting of sanctions in 2016, as a result of the Joint Comprehensive Plan of Action, Iran and Thailand maintain closer economic relations.

Following the death of Bhumibol Adulyadej, the King of Thailand on October 13, 2016, Iranian president Hassan Rouhani offered condolences to the Thai people and their government in a letter sent to Prime Minister Prayut Chan-o-cha saying “the Islamic Republic of Iran always regards the Kingdom of Thailand as an age-old friend and partner and hopes to see the expansion of bilateral relations in all fields".

== Transport ==
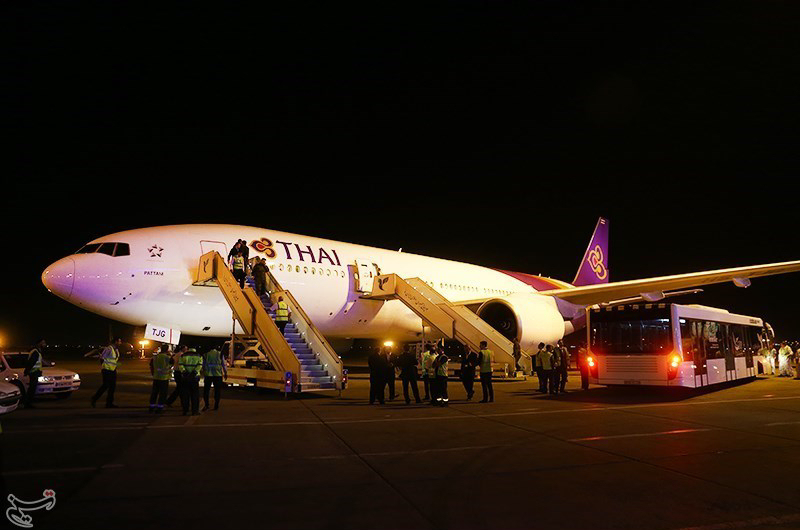
First international flight between Bangkok to Tehran by Thai Airways (October 2016)

Thai Airways International announced in June 2016 that the airline would establish a new route between Bangkok's Suvarnabhumi Airport and Tehran's Imam Khomeini International Airport. This comes after AirAsia X introduced that same route. The first inaugural flight was launched on October 1, 2016.

== State visits ==
On October 8, 2016, Iranian president Hassan Rouhani arrived in Bangkok for the second Asia Cooperation Dialogue summit. President Rouhani met with Prime Minister of Thailand Prayut Chan-o-cha and discussed economic cooperation between the two countries.

== Economic relations ==
Iran is looking into the Thai Rice Standard in order to start importing the product. Thailand also targets to export at least 700,000 tons of rice to Iran every year. In return, Thailand will start receiving imported crude oil and natural gas from Iran and wants to invest in energy businesses which include alternative energy projects.

== Tourism ==
Thailand has become a popular destination for Iranian medical tourists. However, due to numerous incidents of methamphetamine smuggling, Iranians coming to Thailand fall under heavy suspicion from the police.

== Resident diplomatic missions ==
- Iran has an embassy in Bangkok.
- Thailand has an embassy in Tehran.

== See also ==
- Foreign relations of Iran
- Foreign relations of Thailand
- Iranians in Thailand
- Mayuree Naree
- Safine-ye Solaymani
