= Pakistanis in Thailand =

Pakistani diaspora in Thailand

- (Pakistan) (Thailand)

Total population
- ~250,000 (claimed ancestry)(2020)

Regions with significant populations
- Bangkok · Chiang Mai · Chiang Rai · Ayutthaya · Saraburi · Lopburi · Hat Yai

Languages
- Pashto · Urdu · Punjabi · English · Thai

Religion
- Predominantly Islam; Minority Christianity, Hinduism and Buddhism

Related ethnic groups
- Overseas Pakistani

The history of Pakistanis in Thailand is based much before the independence when hundreds of people from regions of current-day Pakistan left for Thailand, then known as Siam.

Most are concentrated in and around areas of Bangkok. Along with Indians, they are part of the much larger South Asian community in the country.

== Occupations ==
The occupations of Pakistani expatriates vary from white-collar to blue-collar labour. Pakistanis form one of the larger communities of Muslims in Thailand.

There are several hundred Pakistani international students at the Asian Institute of Technology in Bangkok; after Thai and Vietnamese students, they consist the third largest group in the university. The movement of Pakistanis throughout the country is common; in 2018, as many as 84,981 Pakistanis visited Thailand.

== Organisations and politics ==
The Thai-Pakistani Friendship Association (TPFA), a government recognised body, based both in Thailand and in Pakistan, represents people of Pakistani origin, whether Thai or Pakistani nationals, throughout Thailand.

In March 2010, Pakistanis living in Thailand protested a conference chaired in Bangkok allegedly focusing on the support of Baloch separatism, a conflict which has gripped one of Pakistani's western provinces. The meeting, known as the "Baloch Voice Foundation", provided a podium for foreign-based Baluch activists and separatists from Pakistan to speak on various agendas. The Thai government additionally came under criticism by the community for allowing such a forum to be held.

There are currently four MPs and two senators in the Thai parliament who have ancestry from Pakistan.

== Crime ==
In 2010, there were about 102 Pakistanis in Thai jails; the prisoners could not be transferred back to Pakistan because of delay in paperwork by the government. Members of the Pakistani community in Thailand had promised to bear the expenses for the return of the prisoners to the country.

It is alleged that there are various Pakistani passport-forging gangs based in Bangkok, some of whom have been cracked down before. According to Thai police, overseas Pakistanis with some of the best techniques in the trade use Thailand as a base for the business. However, the Pakistani embassy in Bangkok has dismissed the claims, alluding the involvement of Indian, Burmese and Nepalese agents in the country.

== Popular culture ==
The Pakistani community of Bangkok is briefly mentioned in the novel Fragrance Beyond Borders by Indian author Amarendra Naryan. The book focuses on the lives of Indians and Pakistanis in Thailand and the relations between the two countries in general.

== Notable people ==
- Swab Phaoprathan, Thai politician
- Kecha Plianvithee, Thai actor
- Napapa Thantrakul, Thai actress
- Chada Thaiseth, Thai politician
- Mananya Thaiseth, Deputy Agriculture Minister of Thailand

== See also ==
- Pakistanis in Burma
- Pakistan–Thailand relations
- Pakistani diaspora
- Ethnic groups in Thailand
