= Reactions to the death of Bhumibol Adulyadej =

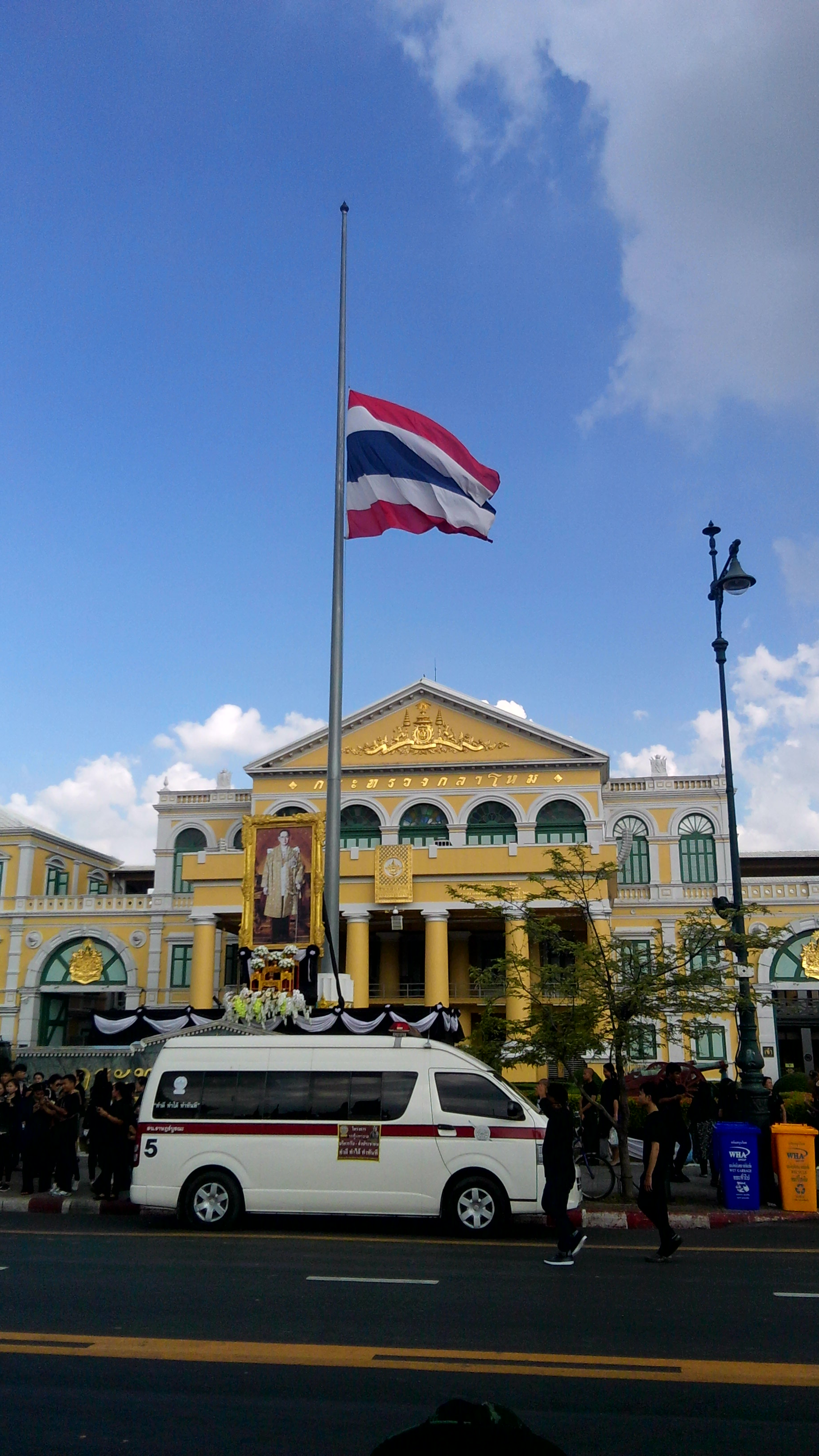
Thai national flag flown at half-mast at the defence ministry building on 28 October 2016

Bhumibol Adulyadej, King of Thailand, died on 13 October 2016, leading to reactions from within Thailand and around the world. Many Thais paid tribute to the king and his 70-year reign, as did other world leaders and monarchs who expressed their condolences. Media outlets in Thailand suspended their programming and broadcast tributes to the late king or switched to monochrome.

== Political ==
=== Thailand ===
Prime Minister Prayut Chan-o-cha addressed the nation in a speech:

His Majesty the King brought people from their hopelessness to their determination, security and courage to cope with obstacles. The reign was a period of comprehensive national development. His Majesty was the beloved King who was the spiritual centre of all Thai people. It was really a 70-year period of righteous reign for the benefit and happiness of Thai people. 13 October will be in the memory of Thai people for good. It was a 70-year period of limitless public benefit and now it is limitless sorrow for the people.

The government will inform the National Legislative Assembly that His Majesty the King had appointed the heir in accordance with the royal law on 28 December 1972, and then the National Legislative Assembly will take the relevant action. Please take the opportunity to boost one another's morale. All of us share the same feelings because we have our common father of the nation. Please help protect national peace and do not let anyone trigger conflicts that would lead to turmoil.

Thai people. His Majesty King Bhumibol Adulyadej, King Rama IX, has passed away. Long live the new king.

=== International ===
==== Africa ====
- Liberia: President Ellen Johnson Sirleaf had sent two separate messages of consolation to the Governments and Peoples of the Kingdom of Thailand and the Republic of Haiti. President Sirleaf stated: "It is with profound shock and deep sorrow that we have learned of the death news of His Royal Highness Bhumibol Adulyadej, King of the Kingdom of Thailand".
- Nigeria: President Muhammadu Buhari condoled with the royal family, government and people of Thailand. In a statement, he extolled the monarch's extraordinary and committed leadership to his people over a period of seven decades. The president noted the deceased's exceptional stewardship which saw Thailand emerged as one of Southeast Asia's leading economies. He said the "highly revered monarch will be long remembered for his towering role and dedication to improving the lives and aspirations of the Thai people".
- Seychelles: President James Michel expressed his condolences to Prime Minister Prayut and said "The king was highly regarded as a unifying father figure with a towering presence. As well an influential and revered figure that commanded the respect of the Thai people as well as the world. The King was prominently engaged in championing democracy over the country he governed with justice, pride and devotion to his people and remained unhinged, being loyal and benevolent in his humble ways to the very end".
- South Africa: President Jacob Zuma extended condolences to the people of Thailand following the passing of King Bhumibol Adulyadej. In a statement, the President said "The South African government extends its most sincere condolences to the government and people of the Kingdom of Thailand in this moment of sadness and grief". He also added that "during King Adulyadej's tenure, he became a unifying father figure and rare source of stability. In all the 70 years as King of Thailand, His Majesty King Bhumibol worked to serve his people, and was regarded as close to divine by the Thais".

==== Americas ====
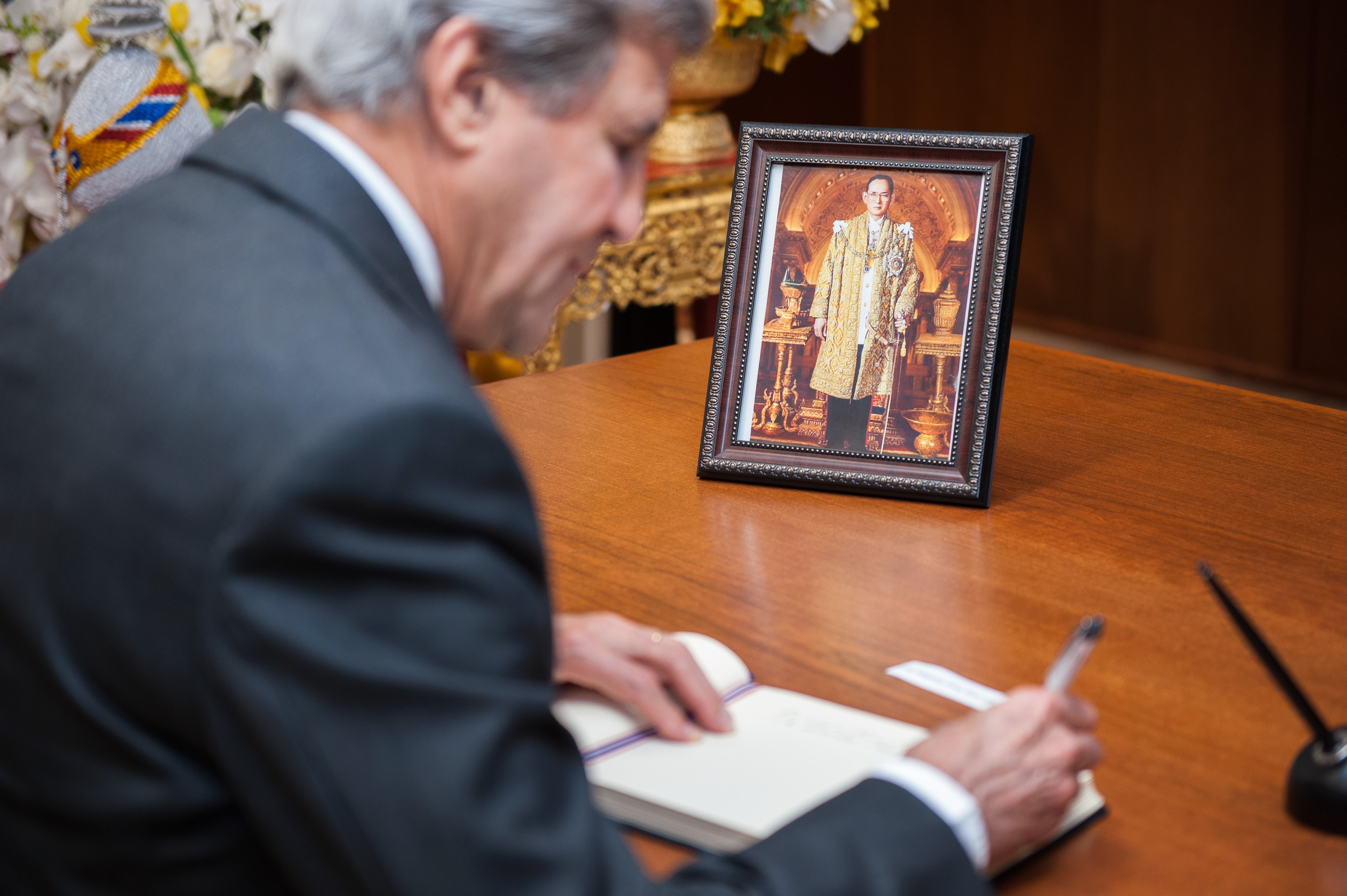
United States Secretary of State John Kerry signs a condolence book for the king at the embassy of Thailand, 21 October 2016

- Argentina: The Ministry of Foreign Affairs, International Trade and Worship said "Throughout its 70-year reign, His Majesty has earned the respect and affection not only of the Thai people but also of the entire international community".
- Brazil: President Michel Temer expressed condolences during a speech at the 8th BRICS summit in Goa, India.
- Canada: Prime Minister Justin Trudeau tweeted: "My condolences to all those mourning the passing of King Bhumibol Adulyadej. My thoughts are with his loved ones and the people of Thailand".
- Guatemala: President Jimmy Morales by means of a press release from the Ministry of Foreign Affairs said: "His Majesty the King of Thailand, was recognized and appreciated by his country, was characterized by dedicating his life to the service of his people. The Government of the Republic of Guatemala sends to the People and Kingdom of Thailand, as well as to the Royal family, their most heartfelt sympathy and solidarity."
- Mexico: President Enrique Peña Nieto tweeted: "Regretfully, I have received the news of the death of His Majesty the King of Thailand, Bhumibol Adulyadej. My condolences to the people and government of Thailand for this heartfelt loss".
- Nicaragua: Vice President and First Lady Rosario Murillo said: "We would like to express our condolences to the people of Thailand, to the families of Thailand, to the Government of Thailand that is in mourning after the death of their King".
- Panama: The Government of Panama, through its Foreign Affairs Ministry expressed its condolences to Thailand and said "Panama stands in solidarity with the Government, the People and the Royal House, for such a sensitive loss and wishes for the continued well-being of the Thais".
- United States: President Barack Obama offered his condolences to Thailand on the death of the king. Obama said King Bhumibol Adulyadej was a "tireless champion" of his country's development and also showed an "unflagging devotion" to improving the standard of living for the Thai people. Obama said the king was a close friend of the United States and a valued partner of many US presidents. He recalled meeting the king during a 2012 visit to Thailand. He said the king leaves behind a legacy of care for the Thai people that future generations will cherish.
  - Secretary of Defense Ash Carter said that the Department of Defense joined President Obama in offering their condolences to the Royal Family of the Kingdom of Thailand and the people of Thailand. "As his majesty's legacy is being honored around the world, I want in particular to recognise his majesty's contributions to the longstanding alliance between our two nations".
  - Secretary of State John Kerry said that the United States "stands with the people of Thailand at this difficult time" after the death of its king. Kerry said in a statement "Our thoughts and prayers are with you. King Bhumibol Adulyadej was born in the US, thus a square named for Bhumibol at his birthplace in Cambridge, Massachusetts will remain an enduring memorial to the special bond he created between our peoples. He will be long remembered and will be deeply missed". Although US-Thai relations ties have been strained since a 2014 military coup in Thailand, the two nations are close allies and have diplomatic relations dating back more than 180 years. Bhumibol visited the US twice in the 1960s and addressed Congress.
  - Former President Bill Clinton and former first lady and Democratic Presidential Candidate Hillary Clinton have offered their heartfelt condolences over the death of Thailand's king, calling him a kind, good leader. "His Majesty deepened ties between the US and Thailand, our first ally in Southeast Asia. He was a true servant leader, acting with wisdom, strength, humility, and genuine care for the welfare of all people. Adding "I was honoured to visit Thailand as President on the 50th year of his reign when we celebrated our shared love of jazz music, and Hillary was grateful to have had the opportunity, with President Obama, to visit with His Majesty on her last trip to Thailand".

==== Asia ====
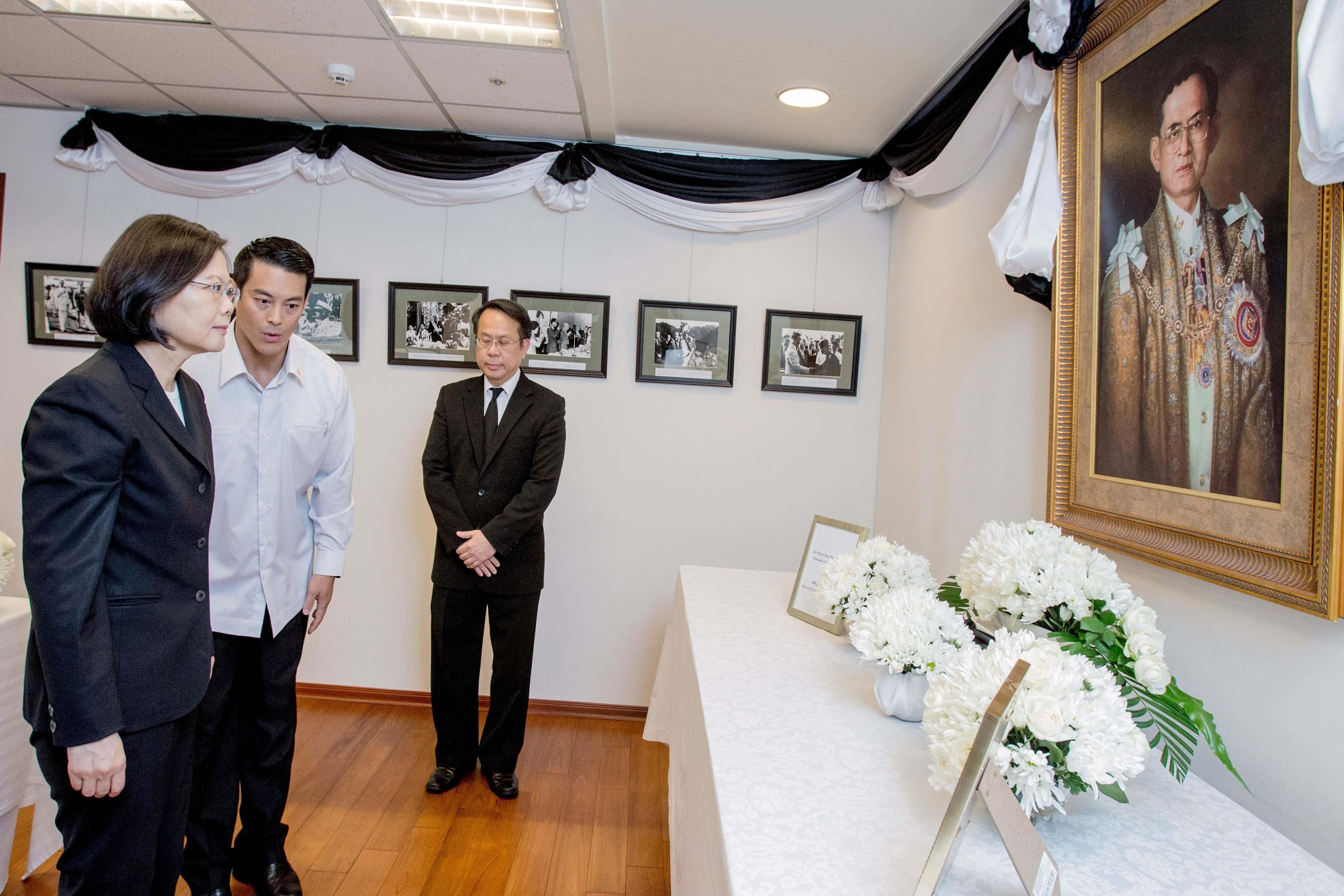
President Tsai Ing-wen of the Republic of China (Taiwan) pays tribute to a portrait of the king, 17 October 2016

- Azerbaijan: President Ilham Aliyev expressed condolences to Prime Minister Prayut over King Bhumibol's death. In a statement, he said "I was deeply saddened by the news of the death of Bhumibol Adulyadej, the King of Thailand. We share your grief on the occasion of this heavy loss, and on behalf of the people of Azerbaijan and on my own behalf, I extend my deep condolences to you, all members of the Royal family and the friendly people of Thailand".
- Bangladesh: Foreign Minister Abul Hassan Mahmud Ali signed a book of condolence at the Thai Embassy in Dhaka. He wrote "His Majesty King Bhumibol has always been held in the highest esteem in Bangladesh as a symbol of benevolence, dedication and humanitarianism. The example of his leadership, accomplishments and love for his people will remain as a lasting legacy not only for Thailand but also for the region".
- Cambodia: Prime Minister Hun Sen signed a book of condolence at the Thai Embassy in Phnom Penh. He wrote: "In this moment of deepest sadness for you and your country, allow me, on behalf of the Royal Government and people of Cambodia, to extend my heartfelt sympathies and profound condolences to Her Majesty the Queen and all members of Royal Family, as well as the Government and the people of the Kingdom of Thailand for this great loss".
- China: President Xi Jinping hailed Bhumibol's contribution to Thailand's development, adding that the "good relationship" between Bangkok and Beijing were due in no small part to "personal efforts made by King Bhumibol himself".
  - The Chinese Ministry of Foreign Affairs said in a statement that Bhumibol worked to strengthen ties between China and Thailand and "made an irreplaceable contribution to cementing the two people's friendship and expanding bilateral cooperation. China deeply mourns King Bhumibol's passing and expresses sincere condolences to the Thai people and government".
  - Hong Kong: Chief Secretary for Administration Carrie Lam expressed profound sadness at the passing of the king. In a statement, she said "On behalf of the people and Government of the Hong Kong Special Administrative Region, it is with great sadness that I express our profound condolences on the passing of His Majesty King Bhumibol Adulyadej. We join the people of Thailand during this period of national mourning and reflection".
  - Macau: Secretary for Administration and Justice Sonia Chan sent a telegram to Prime Minister Prayut to express condolences on the death of the King. The message stated "Having ruled Thailand for 70 years, His Majesty King Bhumibol Adulyadej devoted his life to the country and its people. Under his rule, Thailand achieved steady development, enhancing the love and respect the Thai people felt for him".
- India: President Pranab Mukherjee wrote on his Twitter account that: "People of India share the sorrow and grief of the people of Thailand. Heartfelt condolences on the sad demise of His Majesty King Bhumibol Adulyadej of Thailand".
  - Prime Minister Narendra Modi described the King Bhumibol or Rama IX as "one of the tallest leaders of our times" and offering his condolences to the King family.
  - Indian National Congress President Sonia Gandhi also extended condolences to the members of the royal family and people of Thailand, saying "India has lost a good friend with the passing of King Bhumibol Adulyadej".
- Indonesia: President Joko Widodo said the king was a world leader who was close to his people and brought prosperity during his reign of 70 years. On behalf of the Indonesian government and people, he expressed deep condolences on the death of King Bhumibol Adulyadej. "The world has lost a leader who was close to the people, a carrier of peace and unity and prosperity for the people of Thailand." Jokowi added that the "Thai King's modesty and concerns for his people deserves to be emulated".
- Iran: President Hassan Rouhani offered condolences in a letter to Prime Minister Prayut, saying Iran "always regards [the] Kingdom of Thailand as an age-old friend and partner and hopes to see the expansion of bilateral relations in all fields".
- Israel: The Foreign Ministry issued a statement expressing condolences to Thailand, saying it "shares in the Thai people's sorrow". The ministry advised Israeli tourists in Thailand of a particular need to show "understanding, restraint and patience during this time of sensitivity to many Thais".
- Japan: Prime Minister Shinzo Abe said: "I remember King Bhumibol as a highly gifted and gentle person. As a spiritual support for the people, His Majesty has led Thailand's remarkable development and advancement of the people's living standard. [...] The king's great contribution in deepening friendship between Japan and Thailand will be remembered by all Japanese people."
- Kazakhstan: President Nursultan Nazarbayev sent a telegram to Prime Minister Prayut. In his message, "In memory of the people of Kazakhstan Bhumibol Adulyadej will forever remain a visionary leader and a man of outstanding personality that has made a particular contribution to the establishment and development of friendly relations between our countries. I sharing the pain of loss, on behalf of the people of Kazakhstan expresses deep condolences to Prayut Chan-o-cha, the royal family and all the people of Thailand".
- Kyrgyzstan: President Almazbek Atambayev sent a letter to Prime Minister Prayut. He wrote "The King will remain in our memory as a faithful ruler of his peoples. Sustainable development of Thailand is inextricably linked with his name and constructive work. The people of Kyrgyzstan share the sadness of irreplaceable loss of the Thai peoples and wish the fortitude at this difficult time".
- Laos: President Bounnhang Vorachith signed a book of condolences at the Thai Embassy in Vientiane to mourn the King's passing. In his message, "I referred King Bhumibol Adulyadej as a King who had exerted a high level of sacrifice and great devotion, dedicating physical and mental efforts for the nation and people of Thailand over the 70 years of his reign. I expressed my profound mourning, sadness with all members of the Royal Family and people of Thailand over the king's passing".
- Malaysia: Prime Minister Najib Razak offered his heartfelt condolences to the Thai royal family and the people of Thailand after the death of King Bhumibol. In a statement on Facebook, Najib wrote "King Bhumibol was a towering presence whose contribution to Thailand, and the rest of the region, is beyond words. We join the Thai people in mourning his loss".
- Maldives: President Abdulla Yameen sent a condolence to Prime Minister Prayut. In his message, "It is with deep sadness that I received the news of the passing away of His Majesty King Bhumibol Adulyadej. As the longest serving monarch of the Kingdom of Thailand, His Majesty's immense contributions towards the progress and prosperity of Thailand, particularly towards the betterment of the rural poor will always be remembered. A visionary leader who by his own initiative and demonstration, has transformed the plight of many farming communities in Thailand facing difficulties due to land degradation and water shortages, by demonstrating sustainable methods of agriculture, including water conservation. His Majesty has gained the deep love and affection of his people. At this time of national mourning in Thailand, the Government and the people of Maldives and I personally join you".
- Myanmar: President Htin Kyaw signed a book of condolence to Thai King at the Thai Embassy in Yangon. Earlier the Myanmar's President Office published a statement expressing "sincere condolences for the royal family and people of Thailand".
  - Myanmar Armed Forces Senior General Min Aung Hlaing also signed the condolence book at Thai Embassy in Yangon.
- Nepal: President Bidhya Devi Bhandari sent condolence to Crown Prince Maha Vajiralongkorn, expressing her "profound sadness on the demise of the highly revered Thai monarch".
  - Prime Minister Pushpa Kamal Dahal, Deputy Prime Minister Bimalendra Nidhi and Foreign Minister Prakash Sharan Mahat also sent a similar condolences message.
- Pakistan: President Mamnoon Hussain expressed his condolences over the sad demise of Thai King and said "the government and the people of Pakistan equally shared their grief. The late King was a true friend of Pakistan and had rendered valuable services to bring the two countries closer to each other.
  - Prime Minister Nawaz Sharif also expressed his grief on the sad demise of the King. In a statement, he said "We are deeply grieved by the sad news. The state visit of His Majesty King Bhumibol and Her Majesty Queen Sirikit to Pakistan in 1962 is still cherished as most important milestone in Pakistan–Thailand relations. The people and the Government of Pakistan remain indebted to His Majesty's generous support to the affected people of 2005 devastating earthquake in Azad Kashmir. The relief goods were personally brought by Crown Prince Maha Vajiralongkorn".
- Philippines: Presidential Spokesman Ernesto Abella extended "his deepest condolences to the King family and those the king left behind" on behalf of President Rodrigo Duterte and the Filipino people. Adding that "the King guiding hand behind the emergence of Thailand as one of the most progressive countries in the whole of Asia".
- Singapore: President Tony Tan wrote in his letter to Queen Sirikit: "His Majesty King Bhumibol was truly remarkable and had, throughout his long reign, worked tirelessly for the people of Thailand. The numerous projects launched by His Majesty King Bhumibol brought deep and far-reaching benefits to all corners of the Kingdom. History will remember His Majesty King Bhumibol as a great monarch, and a unifying force deeply loved and respected by the Thai people and the rest of the world". Tony also wrote to Crown Prince Maha Vajiralongkorn, describing King Bhumibol as "an outstanding King who dedicated his life to improving the welfare of his people and developing the Kingdom of Thailand".
  - Prime Minister Lee Hsien Loong, in his letter to Prayut, wrote: "Throughout his long and benevolent reign, His Majesty King Bhumibol had profound compassion for his people, and ceaselessly dedicated himself to improving their well-being. The Prime Minister also commented on the role King Bhumibol played "in fostering the enduring friendship between the Kingdom of Thailand and the Republic of Singapore".
  - Foreign Minister Vivian Balakrishnan in his letter to Thailand's foreign minister Don Pramudwinai said: "His Majesty King Bhumibol was a great blessing to the people of Thailand... he will always be remembered as a wise and compassionate monarch who devoted his time and energy to the people".
- South Korea: President Park Geun-hye has credited King Bhumibol for his leadership as the "father of Thailand and its spiritual pillar" in offering her condolences to the people of Thailand and its royal family. Park expressed gratitude that Thailand during King Bhumibol's reign sent troops to fight with allied forces led by the United States during the Korean War, which was triggered by North Korea's invasion to the South. In a statement, she said "On behalf of the government of the Republic of Korea and its people, I express deep condolences to the royal family and Thai people".
- Sri Lanka: President Maithripala Sirisena said: "We are deeply saddened by demise of His Majesty Bhumibol Adulyadej. May He Attain Nibbana".
- Taiwan (Republic of China): President Tsai Ing-wen visited the Thailand Trade and Economic Office in Taipei to pay homage to the country's King Bhumibol Adulyadej. At the makeshift memorial, Tsai extended her deepest condolences to Thailand for its loss of a great leader in a book of condolences. She wrote "On behalf of the people of the Republic of China (Taiwan), I hereby extend my most profound condolences to the Royal Family and the people of Thailand for their loss of a great leader, His Majesty King Bhumibol Adulyadej".
- Timor-Leste: Government Spokesperson, Minister of State Agio Pereira noted "at this difficult time of loss we express our solidarity with the people of Thailand, convey our condolences to the Royal Family and pay our respects on the passing of the King". Adding that "throughout the King reign, the King focused on people centred development and initiated thousands of projects across areas such as agriculture, irrigation and public health. Some of His Majesty the King's 'Sufficiency Economy' projects were established in rural areas close to Dili in 2003. Thailand was one of the first countries to establish diplomatic relations with Timor-Leste in 2002 and contributed military personnel, police and members of the civil society after the referendum in 1999 and during the following transition to democratic government".
- Turkmenistan: President Gurbanguly Berdimuhamedow expressed condolences in a letter to Prime Minister Prayut.
- Uzbekistan: Interim President Shavkat Mirziyoyev expressed condolences in a letter to Queen Sirikit, according to the Uzbek Foreign Ministry.
- Vietnam: President Trần Đại Quang led a high-ranking delegation of Vietnam's State, National Assembly and Government to the Thai Embassy in Hanoi. Writing in the embassy condolence book, "On behalf of the Vietnamese State and people, I offered my deep condolences to the Queen, Royal Family, leaders and people of Thailand, voicing the belief that they will soon overcome this heavy loss to continue developing the country". Adding that "the monarch's death leaves a great sorrow to the Queen, Royal Family and people of Thailand, as well as the ASEAN Community as a whole. Vietnam always treasures the King's sentiment towards its people, as well as his precious contributions to the friendship and strategic partnership between our countries".
  - Ho Chi Minh City Municipal Administration offered condolences over Bhumibol's death and pledged to solidify HCM City's relations with Thai localities, as well as the two countries' connections.

==== Europe ====
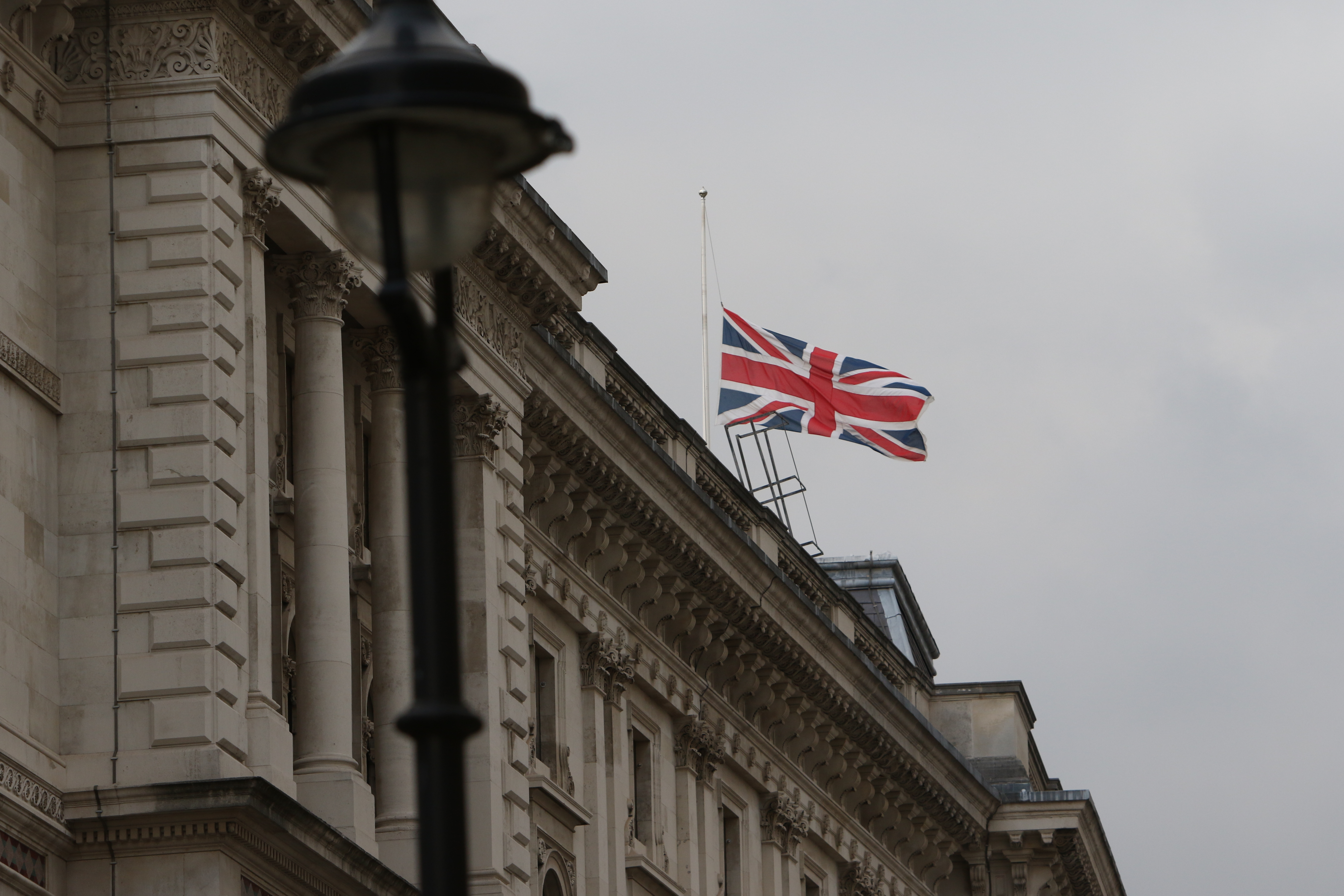
The Union Jack flying at half-mast at the Foreign Office building in London, 13 October 2016

- Belarus: President Alexander Lukashenko described the late king as "an outstanding politician and leader who was promoting the ideals of justice and humanity, developing and enhancing his country for his whole life".
- Finland: Foreign Minister Timo Soini tweeted: "I'm deeply saddened to receive the news about the passing of His Majesty the King; sincere condolences to the people of Thailand".
- France: President François Hollande hailed Bhumibol for his "exceptional human qualities, profound sense of justice, his care for modernity and sustainable development that earned him the affection of the Thai people, as well as the world's esteem".
- Germany: President Joachim Gauck described Bhumibol as "outstanding", recalling the king's state visit to the then-West Germany in 1960.
  - Chancellor Angela Merkel said that Bhumibol "modernised and strengthened his country during his seven decades on the throne", adding that he "worked tirelessly for the welfare of the Thai people" and steered his country through "political and economic crises".
  - Foreign Minister Frank-Walter Steinmeier said Bhumibol had contributed significantly to the friendship between Thailand and Germany.
- Hungary: Foreign Minister Péter Szijjártó expressed his condolences to Thai officials prior to a meeting of ASEAN foreign ministers in Bangkok, saying Bhumibol had "secured stability for Thailand". He also accused the European Union (of which Hungary is a member state) of targeting Thailand with a "political boycott", saying it was an "illogical move, entirely against common sense".
- Ireland: President Michael D. Higgins said the world "lost both its longest reigning head of state and a statesman deeply committed to peace and peaceful co-existence". He extended his condolences to the people of Thailand, saying: "I wish to express my deepest sympathies to his wife, Queen Sirikit, and his children, in particular to his daughter Maha Chakri Sirindhorn whose visit to Áras an Uachtaráin I recall with fondness, as well as to his wider family and to the people of Thailand".
- Italy: President Sergio Mattarella sent a letter of condolence to the Thai royal family. In his message, "I wish to express, on behalf of all the Italian People and my own, deep and sincere condolences on the passing away of His Majesty King Bhumibol Adulyadej. He has been a figure of international stature, who has profoundly marked the history of Thailand. His commitment to the development and prosperity of the Kingdom is reflected by the sincere feelings of esteem and affection expressed by His People. Within the deep bond of friendship that unites the Thai and Italian People, our Country today joins the Kingdom of Thailand in mourning His loss".
- Kosovo: President Hashim Thaçi expressed deepest condolences to people of Thailand for late King Bhumibol Adulyadej. He said "Thailand is such a great ally. We feel sorry for the loss".
- Lithuania: President Dalia Grybauskaitė sent a letter to Crown Prince Maha Vajiralongkorn. In the letter, she wrote "I was greatly saddened to learn of the passing of King Bhumibol Adulyadej. Allow me to offer the condolences of the Lithuanian people and my personal deep sympathy to you, members of the Royal Family, and to the citizens of Thailand. A dedicated and committed leader, King Bhumibol Adulyadej will be always remembered as a highly respected and dearly loved monarch – King of all the people of Thailand."
- Poland: President Andrzej Duda stated: "His Majesty is recognised in Poland as a symbol of Thailand. Many years of his reign, his courage, wisdom and charismatic leadership has been widely admired. For more than 60 years, His Majesty protected His country and His subjects against the tragic events that had occurred in the history of the region. During His reign, Thai people were proud of their country and Thailand prospered immensely, while at the same preserving the values that are fundamental in constituting the Nation such as culture, tradition, the respect for religion and for family bonds. Today, the Kingdom of Thailand is plunged in deep sorrow and mourns His Majesty. The Republic of Poland, on behalf of which, I am writing these words, would like to express our most sincere compassion to the Royal Family, the Government of the Kingdom of Thailand and to all the people of Thailand. We are joining with you in this difficult time."
- Portugal: President Marcelo Rebelo de Sousa sent a message of condolences to the Queen and Crown Prince. In his message, he said "it was with great consternation that I learned of the death of His Majesty King Bhumibol Adulyadej. In this hour of mourning, I present to the royal family and to the whole Thai People, on behalf of the Portuguese People and on my own, the most sincere condolences and deep vows of deep regret. His Majesty King Bhumibol Adulyadej will be remembered for the important legacy he left, for over seventy years, ahead of the Kingdom of Thailand."
- Russia: President Vladimir Putin expressed condolences over the death of Thailand's king, noting the country's achievements during his 70-year reign. Putin said that King Bhumibol Adulyadej has presided over successful economic development and contributed to the strengthening of Thailand's positions abroad. He said in his telegram that the king won "sincere love of his people and high respect abroad". According to the Kremlin executive office, Putin also noted in his letter that the king would be remembered in Russia for his support of friendship and co-operation between the two countries. Putin offered his support for the royal family, the government and the people of Thailand.
- Sweden: Prime Minister Stefan Löfven told Sweden's TT News Agency, "My condolences to the royal family but also to the whole Thai people. King Bhumibol has meant a lot to the Thai people. That one can notice when in Thailand".
- Ukraine: Foreign Minister Pavlo Klimkin sent his condolences to Thailand. In his message, "With deep sorrow I learnt the news about demise of His Majesty King Bhumibol Adulyadej. The King of Thailand was a pillar of stability in rapidly changing times and challenges for the Kingdom. During his reign Thailand embraced industrialisation, social progress and people's prosperity. He was a true inspiring figure, earning devotion of many of his subjects. May his departure soul rest in peace".
- United Kingdom: Prime Minister Theresa May issued a statement, expressing her "sincere personal condolences to the royal family and the people of Thailand on the death of His Majesty King Bhumibol Adulyadej". She went on, "His Majesty guided the Kingdom of Thailand with dignity, dedication and vision throughout his life. He will be greatly missed".
  - Foreign Secretary Boris Johnson also offering his condolences to the people of Thailand. In his message, he said: "I am greatly saddened to hear of the death of His Majesty King Bhumibol Adulyadej. He was greatly respected at home and around the globe for his wisdom and dedication. I offer the people of Thailand and the Royal family my profound sympathy at this sad time."
  - The Foreign and Commonwealth Office additionally requested British citizens in Thailand to "wear sombre and respectful clothing when in public".

==== Oceania ====
- Australia: Prime Minister Malcolm Turnbull described King Bhumibol as "a major figure in modern Asian history". He said through Australian radio 3AW, "We are deeply saddened by the passing of His Majesty and we offer our condolences to the Thai royal family and the people of Thailand. He is a major figure in modern Asian history. Under his reign, Thailand's population grew from just under 20 million to over 67 million and of course the strides in economic and social development have been enormous". Adding that "the Thai community in Australia, which is close to 50,000, will particularly feel the loss of His Majesty, a very, very revered figure".
- Fiji: Prime Minister Frank Bainimarama stated: "The passing of your beloved monarch after 70 years as king is a momentous event for Thailand, the Asia Pacific region and the world. His majesty was not only revered by the Thai people for his record period of service to them but represented stability and continuity in our region during some of the most challenging periods of the past few decades."
- New Zealand: Prime Minister John Key offered his sympathy with the people of Thailand following the death of the king. He said that King Bhumibol "presided over a period of transformative growth and development that saw Thailand emerge as a regional leader and one of Southeast Asia's major economies", and extended the Government's "sincerest condolences to Queen Sirikit, Thailand's Royal Family and all the people of Thailand".
- Papua New Guinea: Prime Minister Peter O'Neill offered his condolences to Prime Minister Prayut and highlighted the strengths of the late monarch. In a statement, he said "I wish to convey our heartfelt and deepest sympathies on behalf of the Government and the people of Papua New Guinea. Over recent years, Papua New Guinea and Thailand have strengthened bilateral relations. His Majesty was a revered leader during his lifetime and proudly represented Thai culture, tradition and heritage around the world for so many decades. As the world's longest serving Monarch, King Bhumibol, led his people as a leader of peace and harmony. Thailand is a very important friend of Papua New Guinea, and we feel for their loss on this sad occasion".

== Foreign royalty ==
- Belgium: King Philippe released a statement: "Deeply saddened by the passing of HM Bhumibol Adulyadej at the end of a long Reign. Our thoughts go to His family and the Thaï population".
- Bhutan: A statement on the Facebook page of King Jigme Khesar Namgyel Wangchuck stated: "His Majesty the Late King Bhumibol has been an exceptional leader, a comforting presence in the lives of every Thai citizen. His Majesty's enduring service for the welfare and wellbeing of his people will be remembered with honour and respect. The Royal Families of Bhutan and Thailand have shared exceptionally warm relations over the years, which have been mirrored by strong bonds of friendship between the two countries". Khesar and members of the royal family and government observed a candlelight vigil at the royal palace in Thimphu in memorial of the late monarch.
- Brunei: Sultan Hassanal Bolkiah conveyed his condolences to Crown Prince Maha Vajiralongkorn over the death of his father. In his letter, he said: "I am deeply saddened to learn of the passing of your beloved father. With his deep and unwavering commitment for the welfare and development of his country and people, His Majesty had shown us the true role model of a great and benevolent leader. His dedication and unbound love towards his subjects, not only win the hearts and minds of the people of Thailand, but also the utmost respect and admiration internationally. Throughout more than 70 years of his reign, Thailand saw tremendous socioeconomic progress. The Father of the Thai Nation will be dearly missed not only by those who know him personally but also the many whose lives he touched."
- Denmark: Queen Margrethe II said in a message to Queen Sirikit: "I was deeply saddened to learn about the demise of your beloved King, His Majesty King Bhumibol Adulyadej. The ties between our families have always been close and Prince Henrik joins me in conveying to you, the Royal family and the people of Thailand our most profound condolences."
- Japan: Emperor Akihito expressed his condolences to Queen Sirikit, saying Bhumibol's "great contribution in deepening friendship between Japan and Thailand will be remembered by all Japanese people". The Emperor and Empress also observed three days of mourning.
- Jordan: King Abdullah II, according to a Royal Court statement, expressed "his deepest sympathies" to crown prince Vajiralongkorn, the royal family and the people of Thailand.
- Kuwait: Emir Sheikh Sabah Al-Ahmad Al-Jaber Al-Sabah sent a message of sympathy to Crown Prince Maha Vajiralongkorn on the death of the Thai king, as did Crown Prince Sheikh Nawaf Al-Ahmad Al-Jaber Al-Sabah and Prime Minister Sheikh Jaber Al-Mubarak Al-Hamad Al-Sabah.
- Malaysia: Yang di-Pertuan Agong Abdul Halim and Sultanah Haminah Hamidun conveyed their condolences.
- Morocco: King Mohammed VI, in a message to Crown Prince Vajiralongkorn, extended his "sincere condolences and deep feelings of sympathy and compassion" to the Thai royal family and nation, adding that he "recalled the qualities of the late King of Thailand, who devoted his life to serve his country and his people with dedication, loyalty and selflessness, working with wisdom and foresight in the development of the Kingdom of Thailand and its stability".
- Netherlands: King Willem-Alexander released a statement: "With emotion I received the news of the death of King Bhumibol Adulyadej of Thailand. For the Thai people he was a beacon of stability, even in turbulent times during his long reign of over seventy years. Again and again he stressed the values of harmony and peaceful cooperation. With warm feelings my wife, my mother and I remember our meeting with him. Our thoughts go out to Queen Sirikit and other members of the Royal Family".
- Norway: King Harald V addressed in a message to Queen Sirikit: "I was saddened to hear about the passing away of His Majesty King Bhumibol Adulyadej, Rama IX, of Thailand. On behalf of myself and of the people of Norway, I extend my condolences to Your Majesty and to your family, and ask that my deepest sympathy is conveyed to the people of Thailand."
- Qatar: Emir Sheikh Tamim bin Hamad Al Thani, Deputy Emir Sheikh Abdullah bin Hamad bin Khalifa Al Thani and Prime Minister and Minister of Interior Sheikh Abdullah bin Nasser bin Khalifa Al Thani sent condolences to the Crown Prince Maha Vajiralongkorn.
- Saudi Arabia: King Salman bin Abdulaziz Al Saud sent a condolences to Crown Prince Maha Vajiralongkorn. Saying "We have been informed of the death of King Bhumibol Adulyadej. I send to you, on behalf of the people and government of the Kingdom of Saudi of Arabia and in my name, deep condolences and sincere consolation to you, with best regards".
  - Crown Prince Muhammad bin Nayef also sent a condolences to Thai Crown Prince. The Crown Prince said "I received with sorrow the news that King Bhumibol Adulyadej has passed away. I extend to you and to the royal family and the friendly people of Thailand sincere and deep condolences, with best of regards".
  - Deputy Crown Prince Mohammad bin Salman Al Saud, Second Deputy Premier and Minister of Defence said "I received the regrettable news of the passing away of King Bhumibol Adulyadej and I offer to the royal family and the people of Thailand deepest condolences and sincere consolations, with regards".
- Spain: King Felipe VI and Queen Letizia sent a telegram to Queen Sirikit, extending to Crown Prince Vajiralongkorn, in which they express their condolences and underline the relations between both countries and peoples.
- Sweden: King Carl XVI Gustaf said he and Queen Silvia "learned with profound regret and sadness" of King Bhumibol's death, in a message to Queen Sirikit. He additionally extended his "sincere condolences" to the royal family and people of Thailand.
- Tonga: Princess Lātūfuipeka Tukuʻaho, Tongan High Commissioner to Australia, signed a condolence book at the Thai embassy in Canberra.
- United Kingdom and other Commonwealth realms: Queen Elizabeth II sent a private message of condolence to Queen Sirikit and upcoming heir Vajiralongkorn. Following the death of Bhumibol, Elizabeth became the longest-reigning incumbent monarch and head of state.

== Organisations ==
=== Non-governmental and supranational organisations ===
- Asian Development Bank: President Takehiko Nakao expressed his deepest condolences to the Thai people and Government upon the passing of their King. In a statement, he said "His Majesty demonstrated strong dedication to his people and worked tirelessly for the development and prosperity of Thailand over several decades. King Bhumibol's contributions to the Kingdom will be remembered by generations to come".
- Association of Southeast Asian Nations: In a joint statement, ASEAN sent a message of condolence to Thailand. The message stated, "In this time of national grief and mourning, we wish to extend our heartfelt condolences and sympathy to Members of the Royal Family, the Government and people of the Kingdom of Thailand. As the world's longest-reigning monarch and revered King of the people of the Kingdom of Thailand, His Majesty's leadership and great service to the people of the Kingdom of Thailand and contributions to regional and international peace and development will be forever remembered with great respect and admiration".
- European Union: President Donald Tusk and Commission President Jean-Claude Juncker sent condolences to Queen Sirikit and members of the Royal Family. In a statement, "It is with great sadness that we have learned of the passing of His Majesty King Bhumibol Adulyadej. King Bhumibol was a well-loved and revered King and a key figure in Thailand's recent history. During his more than 70 years on the throne, King Bhumibol's rural development projects improved the lives of millions of people in Thailand. His contributions touched the lives of many and will be remembered for many generations to come. King Bhumibol will be particularly remembered in Europe for his outstanding commitment to the promotion of sustainable development".
- United Nations: Secretary-General Ban Ki-moon called him "a unifying national leader" who is "highly respected internationally", and expressed his "hope that Thailand will continue to honour King Bhumibol's legacy of commitment to universal values and respect for human rights". General Assembly President Peter Thomson asked the assembly at the start of the meeting on 13 October to stand for a moment of silence in tribute to the king, who died earlier in the day. Shortly after, Russia's deputy UN ambassador, Petr Iliichev, did the same at the start of a Security Council meeting.

=== Other organisations ===
- Badminton World Federation president Poul-Erik Høyer Larsen hailed the late monarch as "an inspirational leader who has left his country and the badminton world a great example". "We have always cherished the special relationship which the BWF has enjoyed with His Majesty and indeed with the entire Royal Family of Thailand and, of course, the immense support which badminton has received. "The King's legacy will inspire generations to come and we will always remember his generosity and love for badminton".
- Currency trading firm OANDA said "it expects investors' nervousness to intensify over fears of political uncertainty following the death of Thailand's king, but it says economic losses will be limited. King Bhumibol Adulyadej, who died Thursday, was a stabilising figure in the Southeast Asian nation, which went through tumultuous change during his 70-year reign". Adding that "although the Thai baht and the stock exchange index will remain under pressure, much of the uncertainty premium is already built into the price of both, thus losses will be limited. We expect the Bank of Thailand will be ready to step in to smooth any disorderly currency moves". It also forecast the military government would extend its tenure to ensure political stability, which "will give support to the SETi (Stock Exchange of Thailand index) once the initial knee-jerk moves have worked through the system".
- The World Boxing Council said: "With the death of beloved King Bhumibol, a golden era is over. There is an ongoing need to continue working on promoting boxing and Muay Thai, to honour the legacy, example and memory of His Royal Highness".
- A statement by the Thai branch of the World Wide Fund for Nature said it was "profoundly saddened" over the King's passing and appreciated his "leadership in the conservation of Thailand's vast natural resources", adding he "has long supported the conservation of Thailand's elephants and the protection of its National Parks."

== Religious figures ==
Pope Francis sent a telegram to the royal family, saying "I was deeply saddened to learn of the death of His Majesty King Bhumibol Adulyadej, and I extend my heartfelt condolences to the Members of the Royal Family and to all the people of the Kingdom at this sorrowful time. I pray that, as a fitting tribute to the late King's legacy of wisdom, strength and fidelity, all Thais may work together to further the path of peace, and I willingly invoke upon all who mourn his passing the consolation of divine blessings".

The 14th Dalai Lama conveyed his condolences to Queen Sirikit, recalling "the honor of meeting the late King during his first visit to Thailand in 1967", to whom the Thai people regarded "as a source of hope and inspiration for more than 70 years".

The former president of the Sri Lanka Amarapura Sect, Maha Mahopadyaya Aggamahapanditha Kotugodadhammawasa Maha Thera, in his message of condolence on behalf of the Maha Sangha states that "the death of Thai King is a loss to the entire Buddhist world as Thailand has played a great role on the re-establishment and preservation of Buddhism in Sri Lanka. The Buddhist Sangha Sects of Siam Nikaya, Amarapura Nikaya and Ramanna Nikaya were introduced to Sri Lanka from Thailand and Myanmar which both were known as Swarnabhoomi".

== Media ==
Upon the announcement of King Bhumibol's death, all television channels suspended regular programming and simulcast special programmes from the Television Pool of Thailand, which consisted of videos and photos of Bhumibol, and coverage of royal events. International channels were blacked out and replaced by this programming, and all programming during this time was carried exclusively in monochrome. Following the funeral procession on 14 October 2016, the channels continued to air the pooled tribute content until midnight local time, after which they were allowed to resume regular programming in colour. However, for the remainder of the thirty-day mourning period, all broadcasters were forbidden from broadcasting content that featured "any element of entertainment, dancing, joy, violence, impoliteness or overly expressed emotion", nor any unofficial information, speculation or criticism related to the deceased king and his successor. After a brief return to monochrome for the anniversary of the king's death on 13 October 2017, colour television broadcasts, with the same restrictions are before, resumed on 19 October the same year.

Other Thai media outlets and websites also switched to greyscale colour schemes, as did the Google website's edition in Thailand.

== Public ==
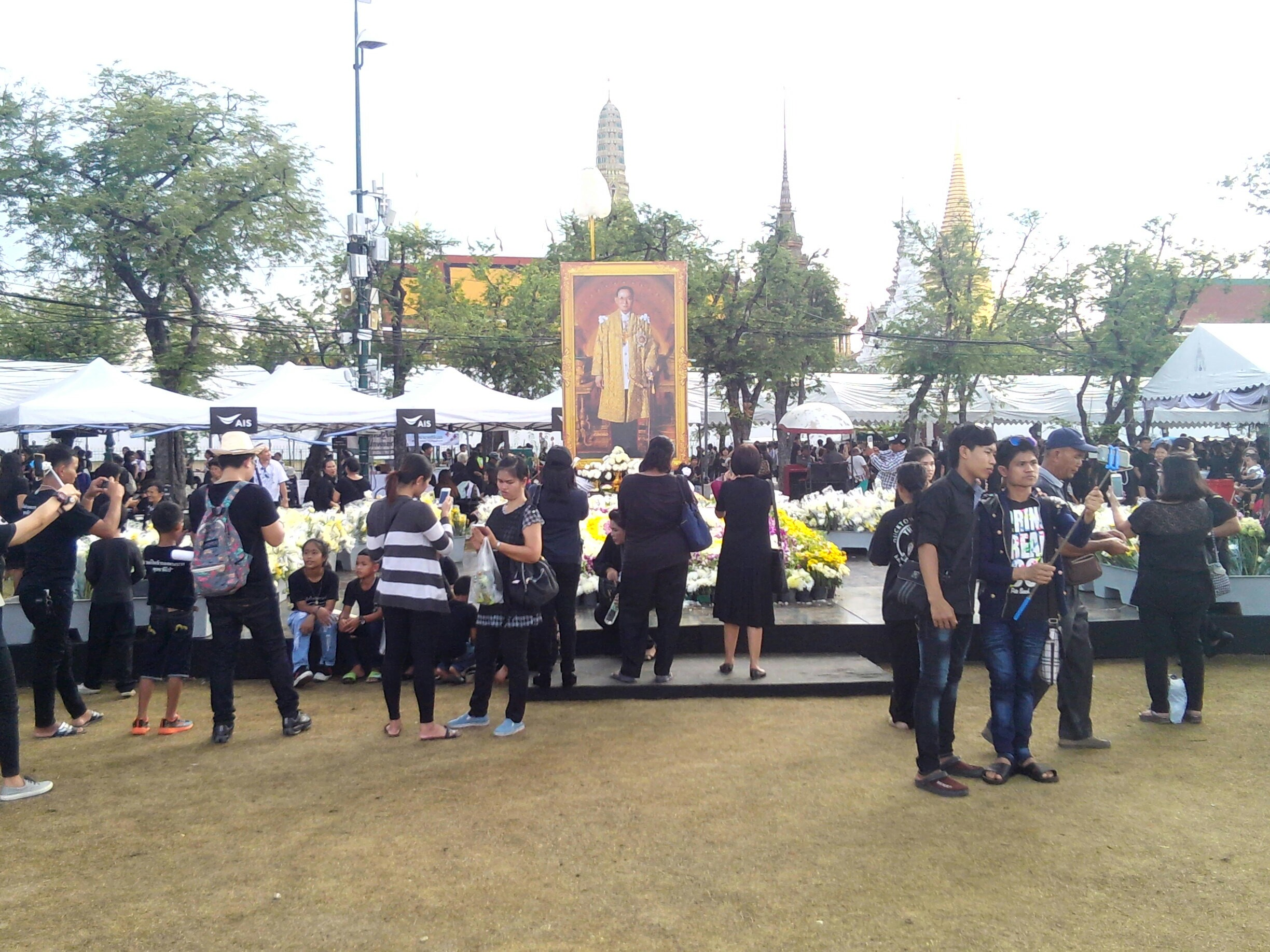
King's portrait displayed at Sanam Luang for public mourning

At the time of the announcement, hundreds of Thais were gathered at Siriraj Hospital, where the king died, wearing pink or yellow (the latter colour representing the monarchy) and displaying his pictures. Following the announcement, thousands lined the streets of the capital for the funeral processions, with many wearing mourning black and others publicly crying. Rural Thais were given free transport to sign their condolences as a queue formed at the Grand Palace, and the government set up a telephone hotline for mourners. Demand for black clothing rose in Thailand amid the mourning period, with stores either selling out or raising prices.

Ultra-royalists criticized and harassed those who did not wear mourning black. They also subjected to witch-hunts people whom they accused of disrespecting the deceased monarch. On 14 October 2016, angry ultra-royalist groups in Phuket Province thronged the residence of a man who posted on social media a number of comments which they thought offensive to the late king and violated the lèse-majesté law, despite the local police having declared that the comments were not in breach of the law. The groups dispersed after the police agreed to prosecute the man for the crime of lèse-majesté. Similar incidents happened the following day in Phang Nga Province. The National Council for Peace and Order, the junta ruling Thailand, also announced that it would hunt down lèse-majesté fugitives.

== See also ==
- Bhumibol Adulyadej
- Death and funeral of Bhumibol Adulyadej
- Reactions to the death of Elizabeth II
