= Iranians in Thailand =

Iranians in Thailand Khaek Ma-ngon, Khaek Mahon, Khaek Chaosen
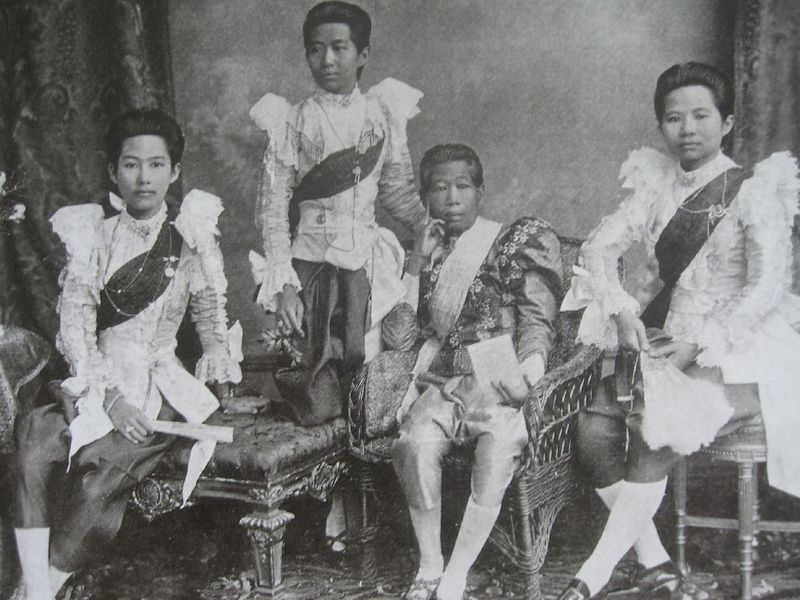

Regions with significant populations
- Bangkok

Languages
- Thai, Persian

Religion
- Theravada Buddhism, minority Shia Islam historically Zoroastrianism and Judaism

Related ethnic groups
- Iranians, Iranian diaspora

Iranian migration to Thailand (Note: Persian: مهاجرات ایرانیان به تایلند, romanized: Mohâjerât-e Irâniyân be Tâyland) began as early as the 17th century. Thai citizens of Iranian descent may be called in Thai as Khaek Ma-ngon, (Note: แขกมะหง่น, แขกมะหง่อน) Khaek Mahon (Note: แขกมห่น, แขกมะห่น) or Khaek Chaosen. (Note: แขกเจ้าเซน; lit. 'Shia Muslim') There is a community of Thai people of Iranian descent who still practice Shia Islam in many districts throughout Bangkok, such as Yan Nawa, Bueng Kum, Saphan Sung, and Min Buri, as well as parts of Chachoengsao Province.

== History ==
During the Ayutthaya Kingdom period, the Iranian community in Thailand consisted primarily of merchants. They are recorded in some memoirs of their fellow merchants, the Dutch East India Company, as well as in the Safine-ye Solaymani ("Ship of Solayman"), an account of a Persian embassy to King Narai. Some descendants of Iranians from the Ayutthaya period converted to Buddhism, and continued to retain influence in Thai public life to the present day; one prominent example is the Bunnag family, whose ancestor "Shaykh Ahmad" is said to have come from Qom and arrived at Ayutthaya in 1602. Shaykh Ahmad crushed and defeated Japanese merchants who attempted a coup against the Thai king in 1611.

== Influence and legacy ==
The presence of Iranians in Thailand came to be felt within the commerce, art, architecture, and culture of Thailand. Pieces of Thai architecture, art, and literature sometimes incorporated Persian-style icons, motifs, and more. A notable Persian work that was translated into Thai was Nithan Sibsawng Liam (Tale of the Twelve Angels), which was mostly drawn from the Shahnameh. The work was composed in 1752 and included topics like kingship and courtly customs. It was purported that King Borommakot would have the work read to him frequently.

Traditional Persian fashion highly influenced the Thai nobility, with robes in particular being worn along with a customary dagger. Persian-inspired culinary etiquette and diet was also popular among Thai nobles.

== Modern tourism ==
In recent years, Thailand has become a popular destination for Iranian medical tourists. However, due to numerous incidents of methamphetamine smuggling, Iranians coming to Thailand fall under heavy suspicion from police.

== Cultural Center ==
An Iranian Cultural Center exists in Bangkok; the Center convenes Persian language classes and facilitates translations of Iranian works into the Thai language.

== See also ==
- Ethnic groups in Thailand
- Iranian diaspora
- Iran–Thailand relations

== Bibliography ==
- Marcinkowski, M. Ismail (2005), From Isfahan to Ayutthaya: Contacts between Iran and Siam in the 17th Century, Singapore: Pustaka Nasional, ISBN 978-9971-77-491-2
