= Kamal Matinuddin =

- کمال متین الدین
- Born: 1926; British India
- Died: 5 February 2017 (aged 90–91); Rawalpindi, Punjab, Pakistan
- Alma mater: Indian Military Academy; Canadian Army Command and Staff College
- Military career
- Allegiance: Pakistan
- Branch: Pakistan Army
- Service years: 1947–1981
- Rank: Lieutenant general
- Conflicts: Indo-Pakistani War of 1947–1948; Indo-Pakistani War of 1965; Indo-Pakistani War of 1971
- Other work: Defence analyst; military historian

Kamal Matinuddin (Urdu: کمال متین الدین; 1926–2017) was a Pakistani general, diplomat, and military historian. He authored works primarily on Pakistan's foreign policy, nuclear policy, and military history.

== Early life ==
Kamal Matinuddin was born in 1926 to an Urdu speaking family of Hyderabad Deccan. He obtained his higher education from the University of Lucknow, before enrolling into the Indian Military Academy in 1946.

== Military career ==
Following Pakistan's independence in 1947, Matinuddin was commissioned as a gunner in the 7th Field Regiment of the Royal Pakistan Artillery. He participated in the First Kashmir War, shelling enemy positions in the Bhimber sector. He studied at the Canadian Army Command and Staff College in Kingston, graduating in 1957. During his 34-year long service in the military, Matinuddin held various staff, instruction and command-related appointments, including heading an infantry division and assuming responsibility for operational planning as the Director General Joint Staff. He witnessed action in the Second Kashmir War and the 1971 War. In 1981, Matinuddin retired as a lieutenant-general from the Pakistan Army.

== Diplomatic career ==
After retiring from the army, Matinuddin joined the Foreign Service and was appointed as Pakistan's ambassador to Thailand. He also served as Pakistan's Permanent Representative to the United Nations Economic and Social Commission for Asia and the Pacific in Bangkok.

== Defence analysis ==
Upon returning to Pakistan, Matinuddin became the director-general of the Islamabad-based think tank Institute of Strategic Studies. In his book Tragedy of Errors (1994), Matinuddin addressed, studied and wrote an eyewitness account of the political differences and causes which underpinned the secession of East Pakistan. The book was translated by Muhammad Sheraz Dasti into Urdu and republished in 2018 as Naslon Ne Sazaa Payi. As a defence analyst, he wrote extensively on the conflict in Afghanistan and on Pakistan's nuclear weapons programme.

== Works ==
- Leo E. Rose; Kamal Matinuddin (1989). Beyond Afghanistan: The Emerging U.S.–Pakistan Relations. Institute of East Asian Studies, University of California. ISBN 978-1-55729-017-5.
- Kamal Matinuddin (1991). Power Struggle in the Hindu Kush: Afghanistan 1978–1991. Wajidalis.
- Kamal Matinuddin (1994). Tragedy of Errors: East Pakistan Crisis, 1968–1971. Wajidalis. ISBN 978-969-8031-19-0.
- Kamal Matinuddin (1999). The Taliban Phenomenon: Afghanistan 1994–1997. Oxford University Press. ISBN 978-0-19-579274-4.
- Kamal Matinuddin (2002). The Nuclearization of South Asia. Oxford University Press. ISBN 978-0-19-579416-8.

== Death ==
Matinuddin died on 5 February 2017 at the Combined Military Hospital in Rawalpindi, aged 90 or 91. His funeral was held at the city's Race Course Ground.
