= Ethnic groups in Thailand =

Thailand is a country of some 70 ethnic groups, including at least 24 groups of ethnolinguistically Tai peoples, mainly the Central, Southern, Northeastern, and Northern Thais; 22 groups of Austroasiatic peoples, with substantial populations of Northern Khmer and Kuy; 11 groups speaking Sino-Tibetan languages ('hill tribes'), with the largest in population being the Karen; 3 groups of Austronesian peoples, i.e., the Malay, the majority ethnic group in the southernmost three provinces, together with the Moken and Urak Lawoi ('sea gypsies'); and both groups of Hmong-Mien. Other ethnic groups include longstanding settlers such as the Teochews, Peranakans, Indians, Persian, Pathans and Portuguese.

== Historical development ==
=== Background ===
Thailand was mainly inhabited by indigenous Austro-Asiatic (Mon-Khmer, Khmu, and Lawa) peoples in the central plains and Northeast, and in the South by Malayo-Sumbawan (Malay) peoples, until the Tai arrived. Following the arrival of the Tai, Hmong and Mien arrived in the West and North from China (Guizhou), either via Laos or Vietnam and then Lao, or in the case of the Loloish Tibeto-Burman peoples (Akha, Lahu), over several centuries up until approximately the twentieth century. The Karen, another Tibeto-Burman people, arrived at and began populating the border between Burma and Siam in the 13th century. Thailand also became home to large numbers of Thai Chinese during the main period of Chinese emigration.

=== The arrival of the Tai ===
From approximately the 7th until the 13th centuries, the Tai, who may have originated in what is now Guangxi in China and bordering areas of Northwest Vietnam, gradually populated the Mekong, Chao Praya, and Salween river valleys, fuelled by a sophisticated rice production system. Strong Tai societies emerged on the Shan plateau in upper Myanmar, along the Mekong in the north in Xishuangbanna, in the Yuan empire of Lan Na, and in the Middle Mekong in the Lao empire of Lan Xang. These societies subsequently developed into polities, for example Chiang Mai, the capital of Lan Na, and Sukhothai. The most powerful to emerge was Ayutthaya, which superseded Sukhothai in the 16th century. From the 16th to the 18th centuries the Burmese expanded east, occupying Lan Na and parts of the Xishuangbanna and eventually destroying Ayutthaya. Nonetheless, Thonburi, the Tai successor state to Ayutthaya, established suzerainty over the Lanna, Luang Prabang, and Malay states and thereby defeated the Burmese, ensuring the primacy of the Tai ethnic groups in the region.

=== The nation-building era ===
Under the Bangkok-based Chakri dynasty, Siam formally incorporated and integrated large numbers of ethnically Laotian people, themselves formed of various subgroups. Siam brought the remaining Lan Xang city-states of Vientiane (destroyed in 1827) and Champasak under direct control in the 19th century. What remained of Lan Na became a vassal until 1896, when it was formally annexed, incorporating large numbers of Kham muang speakers, together with the various ethnic groups sometimes called 'hill tribes', such as the Karen.

In the Malay Peninsula, Siam extended formal rule over large numbers of Malay people. In 1816, Siam divided the Muslim tributary Sultanate of Patani into seven provinces as part of a policy of 'divide and rule'. Via administrative modernisation, in 1901 Siam incorporated all seven provinces into ‘Monthon Patani’, under the new Ministry of Interior. When Kedah was ceded to the English under the Anglo–Siamese Treaty of 1909, in exchange for what became Satun Province, Thailand thereby cemented its official rule over hundreds of thousands of Malay people.

Siamese suzerainty over present-day Laos, together with some Cambodian provinces, was permanently ceded to the French during the formation of French Indochina. In the early Chakri dynasty period, Siamese armies had invaded areas of Laos and returned with large numbers of prisoners of war, especially Phuan and Tai Dam peoples, who were subsequently resettled in the central plains. During the nation-building era, Siam's ethnic map became more varied, as the majority of the peoples of the Khorat plateau, once part of Lan Xang empire, were formally integrated into Siam, incorporating more Lao, Khorat, and Phu Thai, but also smaller ethnic groups such as the Yoy and So, together with the Khmu, Kuy, and Nyahkur along the Khmer border.

As part of Chinese emigration, Thailand received Chinese immigrants over several hundred years, especially during the 19th and early 20th centuries, until the 1930s. This has resulted in many Thai urban centres having ethnically Chinese populations (mainly Teochew speakers).

=== Development of Thai ethnocentrism ===
The 1904 Siamese census deliberately omitted the Lao ethnic identity so as to discourage further French colonial predations, resulting in the Thai officially becoming 85% of the population by ethnicity, rising to 89% in 1912. In the 1900s, membership of the Thai 'race' came to form the basis of citizenship of the modern Thai nation-state. In the 1930s, Thai nationalist Luang Wichitwathakan developed ethnocentric policy which came to equate the Tai linguistic family with a greater pan-Thai race-based ‘nation.’ The first of the 12 Cultural Mandates, of June 24, 1939, renamed Siam ‘Thailand’, or as it was during the Second World War, the ‘Great Thai Empire’, an assertion of Thai imperial identity over subject peoples. Then, in 1943, the influential National Culture Commission, which has survived in various incarnations until the present day (as the Thai Ministry of Culture) was established in order to define and disseminate official Thai national culture.

=== Post-war era ===
Thailand received an influx of tens of thousands of Vietnamese after the end of the French Indochina war. During the Cold War, further nation-building resulted in a polity where 'Thai' and 'Tai' continued to be deliberately conflated and, in the official discourse, nearly everyone was ethnically Thai and so spoke Thai or Thai ‘dialects’, as the regional languages and most smaller Tai languages were described. From the 1960s, census data described up to 99% of the population as ethnically Thai. Nonetheless, academic research of the Cold War period suggests that of these, only 33% spoke Central Thai, with over 50% speaking Lao dialects (Isan), an indication of the number of ethnic Lao or users of Lao as a second language or lingua franca for the Northeast. Thai censuses still do not disaggregate by either the largest or smallest ethnic groups and so reflect Thai national identity rather than the scientific consensus. Thailand saw an influx of a large number of Northern Khmer during the rule of the Khmer Rouge, some of whom permanently settled with indigenous Khmer.

== Official and academic position ==
Ethnolinguistic groups of Thailand in 1974

According to the Royal Thai Government's 2011 Country Report to the UN committee responsible for the International Convention on the Elimination of All Forms of Racial Discrimination, available from the Department of Rights and Liberties Promotion of the Thai Ministry of Justice, 62 ethnolinguistic communities are officially recognised in Thailand. However, of these, only 56 were listed in the Ministry of Social Development and Human Security's 2015 Master Plan for the Development of Ethnic Groups in Thailand 2015–2017, with the larger, ethnoregional ethnic communities, including the Central Thai, being omitted; it, therefore, covers only 9.7% of the population. Twenty million Central Thai (together with approximately 650,000 Khorat Thai) made up approximately 20,650,000 (34.1 percent) of the nation's population of 60,544,937 at the time of completion of the Mahidol University Ethnolinguistic Maps of Thailand data (1997), which provides population numbers for most ethnolinguistic minorities.

The 2011 Thailand Country Report provides population numbers for mountain peoples ("hill tribes") and ethnic communities in the northeast and is explicit about its reliance on the Mahidol University Ethnolinguistic Maps of Thailand data. Thus, though over 3.288 million people in the northeast alone could not be categorised, the population and percentages of other ethnic communities c. 1997 are known and constitute minimum populations. In descending order, the largest (equal to or greater than 400,000) are:

- 15,080,000 Lao (24.9 percent) consisting of the Thai Lao (14 million) and other smaller Lao-related groups, namely the Thai Loei (400,000–500,000), Lao Lom (350,000), Lao Wiang/Klang (200,000), Lao Khrang (90,000), Lao Ngaew (30,000), and Lao Ti (10,000)
- six million Khon Muang (9.9 percent, also called Northern Thais)
- 4.5 million Pak Tai (7.5 percent, also called Southern Thais)
- 1.4 million Khmer Leu (2.3 percent, also called Northern Khmer)
- 900,000 Malay (1.5 percent)
- 500,000 Nyaw (0.8 percent)
- 470,000 Phu Thai (0.8 percent)
- 400,000 Kuy/Kuay (also Suay) (0.7 percent)
- 350,000 Karen (0.6 percent).

Khmer and Mon-Khmer make up approximately 6 percent, the Thai Malays of southern Thailand make up around 3 percent. Among the groups categorized as hill tribes in the northern provinces, Hmong (Mien), Karen, and other small hill tribes make up over 1 percent.

In official Thai documents, the term "hill tribe" (chao khao) began to appear in the 1960s. This term highlights a "hill and valley" dichotomy that is based on an ancient social relationship existing in most of northern and western Thailand, as well as in Sipsongpanna and northern Vietnam. For the most part the Dai/Tai/Thai occupied the more fertile intermontane basins and valleys, while the less powerful groups lived at the less rich higher elevations. This dichotomy was often accompanied by a master/serf relationship. Vestiges of this dichotomy remain today: for example, 30 percent of ethnic minority children in Thailand cannot read by second grade. The corresponding figure for Bangkok is one percent.

== List by ethnic groups and population size ==
- Tais – c. 53–56.5 million
  - Central Thai (Siamese) – c. 25 million
  - Isan (Thai-Lao; Thai Isan; Isan Lao) – c. 18.5–20 million
  - Yuan (Thai Yuan; Lanna) – c. 6–7 million
  - Southern Thai (Thai Pak Tai, Southern Siamese) – c. 5.5 million
  - Phu Thai – 470,000
  - Lao – 222,000
  - Phuan – 200,000
  - Shan (Thai Yai)– 95,000
  - Lue (Thai Lü) – 83,000
  - Tai Ya – 50,000
  - Nyaw – 50,000
  - Saek – 11,000
  - Khun (Thai Khun) – 6,280
  - Tai Dam (Black Tai) – 700
- Sino-Tibetan
  - Chinese (primarily Teochew) – c. 6–9 million
  - assimilated Sino-Thai (Luk Chin) – > 4.5 million
  - non-assimilated Chinese – c. 1.4 million
  - Karen – c. 1 million
  - Lahu – 100,000
  - Lisu – 40,000
  - Akha – c. 20,000
  - Lolo (Yi) – unknown
- Austroasiatic - 2.2 million
  - Khmer – > 1.2 million
  - Mon – 414,500
  - Kuy – 400,000
  - Sô – 70,000
  - Lua – 48,000
  - Bru – 25,000
  - Phai – 20,000
  - Vietnamese – 17,662
  - Lawa – 17,000
  - Khmu – 10,000
  - Palaung (De'ang) – 5,000
  - Nyahkur (Nyah Kur, Chao-bon) – 1,500
  - Chong – less than 500
  - Pear – less than 500
  - Sa'och – less than 500
  - Mlabri – less than 400
- Negrito
  - Maniq – 300
- Austronesian - 2.4 million
  - Malays – 2–4 million
  - Cham – 4,000
  - Urak Lawoi – 3,000
  - Moken – c. 2,000
- Indo-European - 770,000
  - Thai Indians (multiple ancestries) – 450,000
  - Pakistanis – 250,000
  - Iranians – 70,000
- Hmong-Mien - 290,000
  - Hmong – 250,000
  - Yao – 40,000

== List by language group ==
The following table comprises all the ethnolinguistic identities recognised by the Royal Thai Government in the 2011 Country Report to the UN Committee responsible for the International Convention for the Elimination of All Forms of Racial Discrimination, available from the Department of Rights and Liberties Promotion of the Thai Ministry of Justice

Five ethnolinguistic families of Thailand recognized by the Royal Thai Government
Tai	Austroasiatic	Sino-Tibetan	Austronesian	Hmong-Mien
24 Groups	22 groups	11 Groups	3 Groups	2 Groups
Kaleung	Kasong	Guong (Ugong)	Malay (Malayu / Nayu / Yawi	Hmong (Meo)
Kammuang / Yuan (Northern Thai)	Kuy / Kuay	Karen (7 subfamilies)	Moken / Moklen	Mien (Yao)
Tai Dam	Khmu	Sgaw Karen	Urak Lawoi	
Nyaw	Thailand Khmer, Northern Khmer	Pwo Karen		
Tai Khun	Chong	Kaya Karen		
Central Thai	Sa-oc	Bwe Karen		
Thai Korat	Sakai (Kensiw / Manique)	Pa-O Karen		
Thai Takbai	Samre	Padaung Karen		
Thai Loei	So (Thavuang)	Kayo Karen		
Tai Lu	So	Jingpaw / Kachin		
Tai Ya	Nyah Kur (Chaobon)	Chinese		
Tai Yai, Shan	Nyeu	Yunnanese Chinese		
Southern Thai	Bru (Kha)	Bisu		
Phu Thai	Plang (Samtao)	Burmese		
Phuan	Palaung (Dala-ang)	Lahu (Muzur)		
Yong	Mon	Lisu		
Yoy	Mal-Pray (Lua / Tin)	Akha		
Lao Khrang	Mlabri (Tongluang)	Mpi		
Lao Ngaew	Lamet (Lua)			
Lao Ti	Lavua (Lawa / Lua)			
Lao Wiang/Lao Klang	Wa			
Lao Lom	Vietnamese			
Lao Isan				
Saek				

The following table shows all the ethnic groups of Northeast Thailand, as recognised in the same report.

Ethnic groups of Northeast Thailand by language family
Tai Language Family	Persons	Austroasiatic Language Family	Persons
Lao Esan / Thai Lao	13,000,000	Thailand Khmer / Northern Khmer	1,400,000
Central Thai	800,000	Kuy / Kuay	400,000
Thai Khorat / Tai Beung / Tai Deung	600,000	So	70,000
Thai-Loei		Bru	combined
Phu Thai	500,000	Vietnamese	20,000
Nyaw	500,000	Ngeu	10,000
Kaleung	200,000 for	Ngah Kur / Chao Bon / Khon Dong	7,000
Yoy	Kaleung, Yoy and Phuan	So (Thavaung)	1,500
Phuan	combined	Mon	1,000
Tai-dam (Song)	(not specified)		
Total	16,103,000	Total	1,909,000
Cannot specify ethnicity/number			32,888,000
			21,300,000

Note that population numbers are for the northeast region only. Languages may have additional speakers outside the northeast.

== See also ==
- Demographics of Thailand
- Languages of Thailand
- Nationality, religion, and language data for the provinces of Thailand
