= Gacha Plienwithi =

Thai actor (1926–2021)

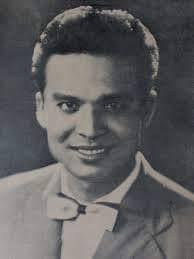
- Born: Gecha Danmatam; 1 April 1926; Ban Pong District Ratchaburi Province Siam
- Died: 28 July 2021 (aged 95); Uthai Thani Province, Thailand
- Occupation: Actor
- Years active: 1955-1990, 2009
- Spouse: 2
- Children: 5

Gacha Plienwithi (เกชา เปลี่ยนวิถี, also spelled Kecha Plianvithee; 1 April 1926 – 28 July 2021) was a senior Thai actor, best remembered for playing the godfather in the film Operation Bangkok in 1966. He played villains for most of his acting career.

== Life ==
Gacha Plienwithi, whose real name and surname was Gecha Danmatam, was born on Monday, 1 April 1926 in Ban Pong District, Ratchaburi Province. Plienwithi traced his ancestry to what is now Pakistan. In his youth, he used to live like a gangster before and worked as a bus queue supervisor. His acting career began in 1955, playing as the male protagonist in the film Phrai Kwang (1956) of Lawo Film by Phra Ong Chao Anusorn Mongkolkarn. Made him was elected to act as King Naresuan the Great in the historical film, Phra Naresuan the Great, of Assawin Film by Phra Ong Chao Bhanubandhu Yugala in 1957, alongside Rattanaporn Intarakamhang, but eventually he was arrested for posing as a threat to society before the filming of this film began at the end of the government of Field Marshal Plaek Pibulsongkram and was imprisoned for many years. As for the male protagonist of the film, this movie has been changed to a former famous Thai boxer in the late 1940s-early 1950s, Chuchai Phrakhanchai, to act instead.

After being released from imprisonment Gacha went to work at a stone mill in Ratchaburi province his hometown. Later, around 1965, he was persuaded by Prinya Tassaneeyakul, a famous filmmaker at that time from the Thai Union Film Co., Ltd. who was the producer of the blockbuster movie "Operation Bangkok" to play the lead role as the villain chief, opposite the famous actors of the era, Mitr Chaibancha, Petchara Chaowarat and Luechai Naruenat, who are former famous male protagonist who have returned to film again. It was first released in 1966. Gacha rose to prominence again as the villain from this film, and he has been playing the main villain in the style of Godfather in various Thai films since then. He had many acts until he decided to stop acting. Before returning to the movies again, which was the last film of his life was Phobia 2 (5 แพร่ง) episodes, Ward (ห้องเตียงรวม), produced by GTH in 2009, playing the role of a patient along with Dan Worrawech Danuwong, another protagonist of this episode.

At the last moment of his life, Gacha Plienwithi was diagnosed with the COVID-19 virus. while traveling to visit his nephew in Uthai Thani Province therefore admitted to Uthai Thani Hospital on Wednesday, 14 July 2021, with Chada Thaiseth, member of the Uthai Thani Provincial House of Representatives Bhumjaithai Party who has the honor of being Gacha's nephew be in charge expenses even sickness from COVID-19 improved until the doctor prepared to let him go back to recuperate at home but he died of sudden old age on Wednesday, 28 July 2021, at the age of 95. His body was brought to a burial according to Islamic principles at Kubor Ban Pong Ban Pong District Ratchaburi Province according to his wishes before his death.
