= Safine-ye Solaymani =

1685 Persian travel account

The Safine-ye Solaymani (Persian: سفینه سلیمانی; lit. "Ship of Solayman") is a Persian travel account of an embassy sent to the Siamese Ayutthaya Kingdom in 1685 by Suleiman I (r. 1666–1694), King (Shah) of Safavid Iran. The text was written by Mohammad Rabi ibn Mohammad Ebrahim, the secretary of the embassy. The text provides excellent information on Iran's historical and cultural presence in the eastern Indian Ocean region. It also gives many details about Siam's late seventeenth century Iranian community. It is the only extant Persian source for the rich history of Safavid contacts with this particular region of the world.

== Translations ==
- Muhammad Rabi' ibn Muhammad Ibrahim (1972). The Ship of Sulaiman. Translated by John O' Kane. New York: Columbia University Press. ISBN 0-231-03654-X. (An English translation of the Safine-ye Solaymani based on a manuscript housed at the British Museum. Contains notes and an introduction by the translator)

== Bibliography ==
- Marcinkowski, M. Ismail (2002). "SAFINE-YE SOLAYMANI". Encyclopaedia Iranica.
- Marcinkowski, M. Ismail (2004). "SOUTHEAST ASIA i. PERSIAN PRESENCE IN". Encyclopaedia Iranica.
- Marcinkowski, M. Ismail (2005). "A Unique Source in Persian: The Ship of Sulaymān". From Isfahan to Ayutthaya: Contacts Between Iran and Siam in the 17th Century. Pustaka Nasional Pte Ltd. pp. 18–43. ISBN 978-9971774912.
