= Pakistan–Thailand relations =

- Pakistan: Thailand

Pakistan and Thailand formally began diplomatic relationships on 10 October 1951. Pakistan maintains an embassy in Bangkok, whereas Thailand maintains an embassy in Islamabad and a Consulate General in Karachi.

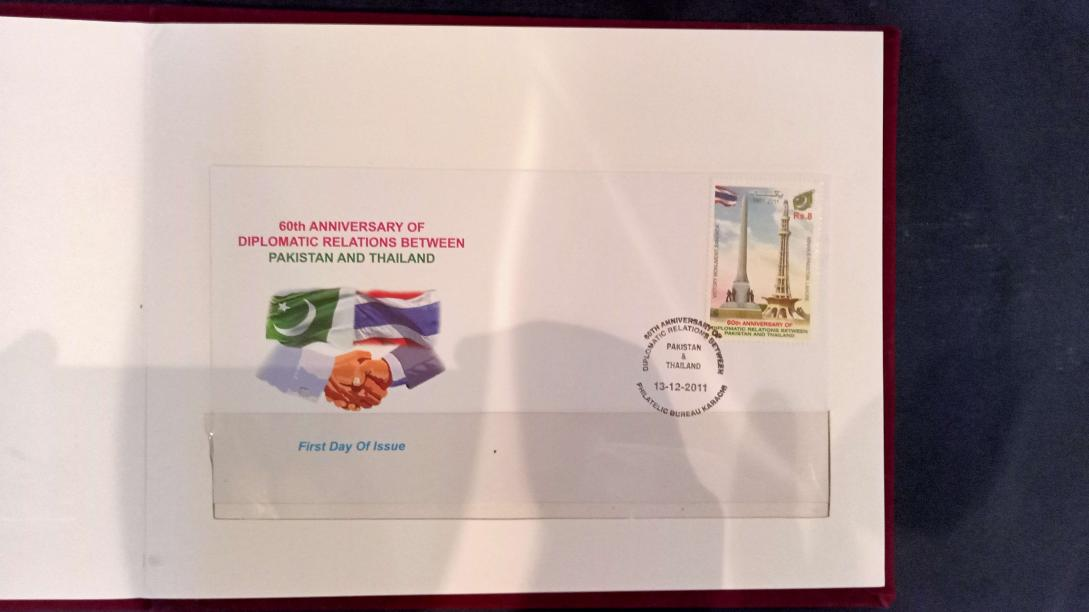
Stamp commemorating the Sixtieth Anniversary of Diplomatic Relations between the countries.

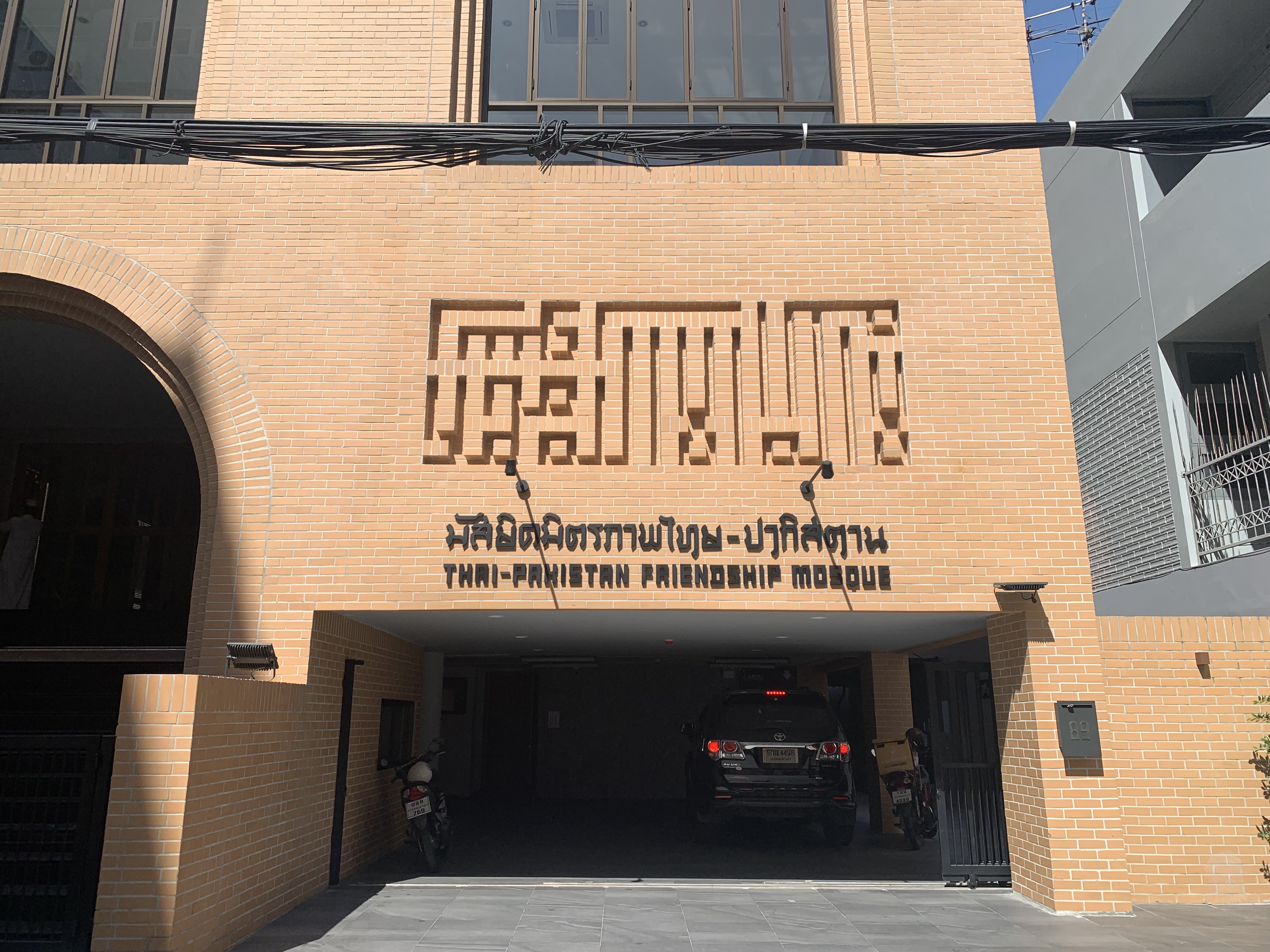
Thai-Pakistan Friendship Mosque in Bangkok

== Trade links ==
Bilateral trade volume between Pakistan and Thailand in 2008 was around US$750 million. With seafood, textiles and others accounting for some of Pakistani exports to Thailand, and motorcars and chemical products accounting for Thai export to Pakistan.

The investment boards of the two countries have signed a memorandum of understanding (MoU) on sharing investment intelligence, encouraging prospective investors and technical assistance. And a Thai-Pakistan chamber of commerce has also been established to facilitate trade and investment between the two countries.

In August 2013, the Thai Prime Minister visited Pakistan in the first visit in a decade.

== Population ==
In 2008, a total of 63,258 Pakistanis visited Thailand for tourism and 2,618 Thais visited Pakistan for tourism. Pakistan is a popular Buddhist religious pilgrims destination, as it is home to several ancient Buddhist heritage. There are around 120 Pakistani students at the Asian Institute of Technology in Bangkok, and several hundred Thai Muslim students in religious studies at Pakistani universities.

== Defense cooperation ==
Both countries have also shown interest in defense cooperation, and conducted high level meetings. The Pakistan Ordnance Factory (POF) is exporting different types of ammunition to Thailand including artillery ammo, fuses and propellants.

== Resident diplomatic missions ==
- Pakistan has an embassy in Bangkok.
- Thailand has an embassy in Islamabad and a consulate-general in Karachi.

== See also ==
- Foreign relations of Pakistan
- Foreign relations of Thailand
- Pakistanis in Thailand
